= Seaham High School =

Secondary school located in Seaham, County Durham, England

Location
- Station Road; Seaham, County Durham, SR7 0BH; England
- Coordinates: 54.84458°N 1.36263°W

Information
- Type: Academy
- Local authority: Durham County Council
- Trust: Eden Learning Trust
- Department for Education URN: 147711 Tables
- Ofsted: Reports
- Head teacher: Geoffrey Lumsdon
- Gender: Coeducational
- Age: 11 to 16
- Website: http://www.seahamhighschool.com/

Seaham High School (formerly Seaham School of Technology) is a coeducational secondary school located in Seaham, County Durham, England, for pupils aged 11–16. It is the only secondary school in the area, acting as a hub for most year 6 children leaving the local primary schools. The school is part of the Eden Learning Trust.

== History ==
Seaham School of Technology opened in 1964 on a site in Burnhall Drive in Seaham. It was a comprehensive school that later incorporated two other secondary schools: Seaham Northlea (1975; until 1962, this had been known as Seaham Harbour Girls Grammar School) and Seaham Camden Square (1979). Seaham Grammar Technical School opened in 1964, which became Seaham Northlea Comprehensive around 1971.

=== 21st century ===
In 2007, the local Seaham Star newspaper reported that the school was to be rebuilt on a field at the back of the Milton Close area of Deneside. Pupils and parents were invited into the school to voice their opinion on plans for the new school. Its cost was estimated at £16,000,000 and was scheduled for construction in 2013.

Later, planning permission for a new school building was granted for a site formerly occupied by Seaham Colliery (locally known as "The Knack"). However, in 2010, the Building Schools for the Future plan was scrapped by the new Conservative coalition government.

In 2010 the school was temporarily placed under 'special measures' after Ofsted identified several critical failures, including poor examination results and site security issues. The school was removed from special measures in late 2010 after Ofsted noted an improvement in performance.

Plans to rebuild the school were resurrected in August 2014. In September 2014, it was reported that the school building had structural problems and was being held up with 60 tonnes of steel. The rebuilding of the school was one of 12 schemes submitted to Durham County Council in late 2014.

In September 2016, the school moved to a new £14 million building on Station Road in the town, and was renamed Seaham High School. The previous school was to be demolished and the site used for housing.

In May 2017, Ofsted visited the school and classed it as 'Good'.

Previously a community school administered by Durham County Council, in September 2020 Seaham High School converted to academy status. The school is now sponsored by the Eden Learning Trust.

== Further education ==
The school currently does not have its own sixth form; most students leaving the school go to East Durham College, Sunderland College or Durham Sixth Form Centre.

== Notable former pupils ==
- Julie Elliott, Labour MP since 2010 for Sunderland Central
- Ian Pattison (cricketer)
