= Grangetown, Sunderland =

Coordinates: 54.8859°N 1.3682°W

Grangetown
- Location within Tyne and Wear
- OS grid reference: NZ404546
- Metropolitan borough: City of Sunderland
- Metropolitan county: Tyne and Wear
- Region: North East
- Country: England
- Sovereign state: United Kingdom
- Post town: SUNDERLAND
- Postcode district: SR2
- Dialling code: 0191
- Police: Northumbria
- Fire: Tyne and Wear
- Ambulance: North East
- UK Parliament: Sunderland Central

Grangetown is a suburb of the City of Sunderland, in Tyne and Wear, England. Grangetown, which is an area within the Hendon Metropolitan District, was part of the Sunderland South parliamentary constituency for elections to the House of Commons of the United Kingdom, but in 2010 was made a ward of the new Sunderland Central parliamentary constituency.

Primarily consisting of low-rise suburbs, it borders the North Sea on its east side, and Leechmere Industrial Estate on its West side. It is approximately 2 kilometres south of Sunderland City Centre. Notable sites in Grangetown include Hendon Beach, which is between Grangetown and Hendon and the Sunderland Eye Infirmary, the only eye infirmary in Sunderland. However, a new eye infirmary has been built in Sunderland City Centre and as of September 2026, the original eye infirmary is scheduled to be demolished.

== History ==
Prior to the 1890s, the area that is now Grangetown was largely undeveloped farmland. There were two ranges, Ryhope Grange and Hendon Grange, and two mills, Ryhope Mill and Stoup Mill, both corn mills.

In an early map of the area taken by The Ordenance Survey, several fields encompassing what is now Sunderland Cemetery were labelled "Chester Stones". Although the use of the word "Chester" implies it was the remains of an old Roman military camp or fort, archaeological efforts cannot take place because of the presence of the cemetery. According to The Sunderland Antiquarian Society, a Roman road may be present under St. Aiden's Avenue, due to Roman Cobbles supposedly being found beneath it during roadwork. As of 2025, no proven archaeological evidence for the existence of a former Roman fort or road in the area has been found.

In 1911, St Aidan's Church was erected by the Church of England, being funded by donations from across the Diocese of Durham. At the time of its erection, it could hold 450 people. The church holds an annual flower festival from 8 to 10 September.

By the 1940s, Grangetown had largely been developed, with most of its farmland being turned into suburbs.

Grangetown today is home to many local businesses and services, most of which reside on Ryhope Road, including The Alexandra Steak House and The Grangetown Working Men's Club. In January 2024, Sunderland City Council greenlit the construction of a Home Bargains convenience store on Leechmere Road.

== Transport ==
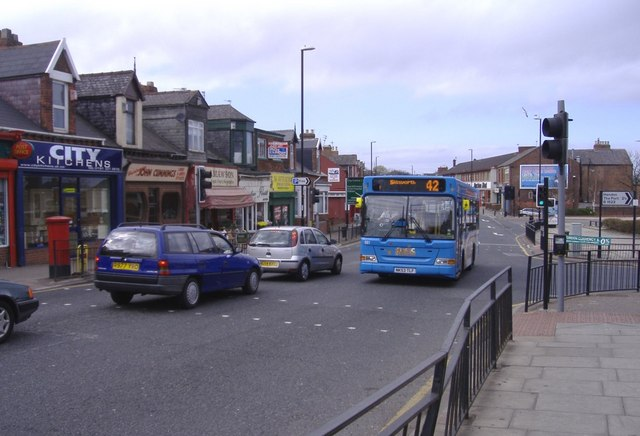
A section of Ryhope Road that runs through Grangetown front, circa 2008.

=== Road ===
Grangetown is serviced by 3 main roads: the B1522 (Ryhope Road), Leechmere Road, and Queen Alexandra Road. Ryhope road was formerly the main route of the A1018, but was changed to a B road when the Sunderland Southern Radial Route opened in 2008. Leechmere Road meets Tollbar Road at a Roundabout In Tunstall and becomes the B1405, and Queen Alexandra Road runs from Grangetown to Barnes, eventually intersecting with Silksworth Lane and becoming a part of the A690.

=== Buses ===
Bus services are offered by Go North East, Stagecoach and Arriva with Go North East operating the 60, 61, 62, 62a, 63, and X6 bus routes, Stagecoach operating the 10 and 11 bus routes, and Arriva operating the 22 bus route.

Grangetown is not serviced by any trains or by the Tyne and Wear Metro.
