= A1231 road =

Road in Tyne and Wear, England

A1231

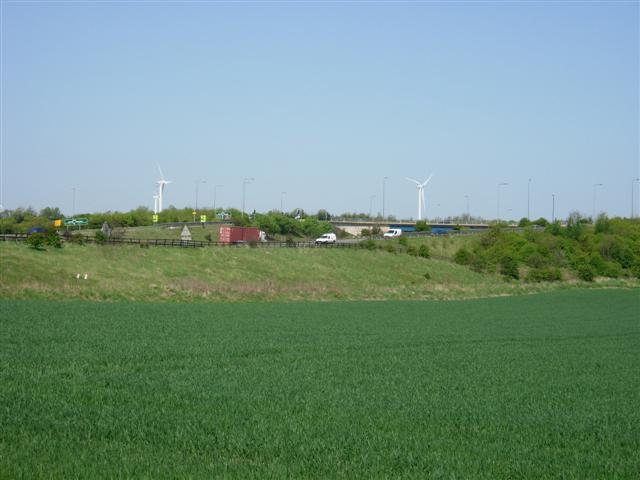
- A19/A1231 interchange; the wind turbines are part of the Nissan car plant.

Route information
- Maintained by Sunderland City Council
- Length: 9.6 mi (15.4 km)

Major junctions
- East end: A1018, Sunderland
- A1018; A690; A183; A1290; A19; A195; A182; A1
- West end: A1, Washington

Location
- Country: United Kingdom
- Constituent country: England
- Boroughs: Sunderland
- Primary destinations: Sunderland; Washington

Road network
- Roads in the United Kingdom; Motorways; A and B road zones
← A1214	→ A1232

The A1231 road connects Sunderland and Washington in Tyne and Wear, North East England. It is the main road connecting these towns and is one of the main roads giving access to Sunderland city centre.

== South Sunderland ==
The A1231 originates as a single carriageway at the 'Whitehouse Road' / 'Addison Road' roundabout junction with the A1018 'Commercial Road' in Hendon. It then runs via the 'Esplanade' gyratory on the southern edge of Mowbray Park, just south of the city centre, to an intersection with 'Ryhope Road', which is the main road to the south of the city.

Then, as 'Stockton Road', the A1231 heads north, past the Park Lane Interchange and toward the 'Priestman Roundabout' which is the end-point of the A690 road, the main trunk road to the south-west of the city and Durham.

Immediately north of 'Priestman', the A1231 is a dual carriageway named 'St. Michael's Way', part of which it shares with the A183 road to the 'Livingstone Road' / 'Silksworth Row' roundabout.

The A1231 then leads north west as 'Silksworth Row' then past a retail park as 'Trimdon Street'; and past Corning Glass Works as 'Pallion New Road', before reaching the south end of Northern Spire Bridge to cross the Wear. There are plans to convert the section from the city centre to dual carriageway. The section along Silksworth Row has been amended to run on a much straighter and wider alignment than before. The roundabout between Silksworth Row and Trimdon Street has been remodeled into a large roundabout with additional lanes and Trimdon Street is now a completed dual carriageway. The roundabout between Pallion New Road, Beech Street, Trimdon Street, Carol Street and Deptford Road no longer exists. This is due to Trimdon Street is on a newer alignment in preparation for the new section of the A1231 being opened. In place of the roundabout is a set of staggered traffic lights with a right turn to Beech Street and then a Left turn onto Pallion New Road (current A1231 as of 2 November 2021). The new section will continue north into Deptford on a completely new road, descending towards the river before bending towards the west. It will go under the Queen Alexandra Bridge (the old A1231), through the old abandoned Doxford shipyards and emerges onto the southern approach road to the Northern Spire bridge. This road looks as though it is now complete. Just a few final touches to be placed and should be open by early 2022.

== North Sunderland ==
The A1231 becomes a 50 mph (80 km/h) speed limit dual carriageway, 'Wessington Way', passing through the southern edge of Southwick, Castletown and Hylton Castle. To the south, the Hylton Riverside retail park is parallel to the road. Along this section a park and ride scheme operates on matchdays for visitors to the Stadium of Light.

== Washington ==
The road passes over the A19 and heads west toward Washington as the 'Sunderland Highway'. Just past the A19, the A1231 runs along the southern edge of the Nissan car plant. The A1231 crosses the A182, 'Washington Highway', as it passes the Galleries Shopping Centre in Washington town centre.

The A1231 terminates as a feeder to the north-bound A1 north west of Birtley.
