= Washington Highway =

Washington Highway may refer to:

- A183 road (England), called Washington Highway
- U.S. Route 1 in Virginia, called Washington Highway in Hanover County
