= A183 =

A183 may refer to:

- A183 road (England), a road connecting South Shields, Tyne and Wear and Chester-le-Street, County Durham
- A183 road (Malaysia), a road in Perak
