= Grangetown =

Grangetown may refer to:

- Grangetown, Cardiff, a district and community in Wales
- Grangetown (Cardiff electoral ward), a ward in Cardiff
- Grangetown, North Yorkshire, Redcar and Cleveland, England
- Grangetown, Tyne and Wear, Sunderland, England
