= A1(M) motorway =

Four separate motorway sections in England

A1(M) A1

A1(M) highlighted over other motorways

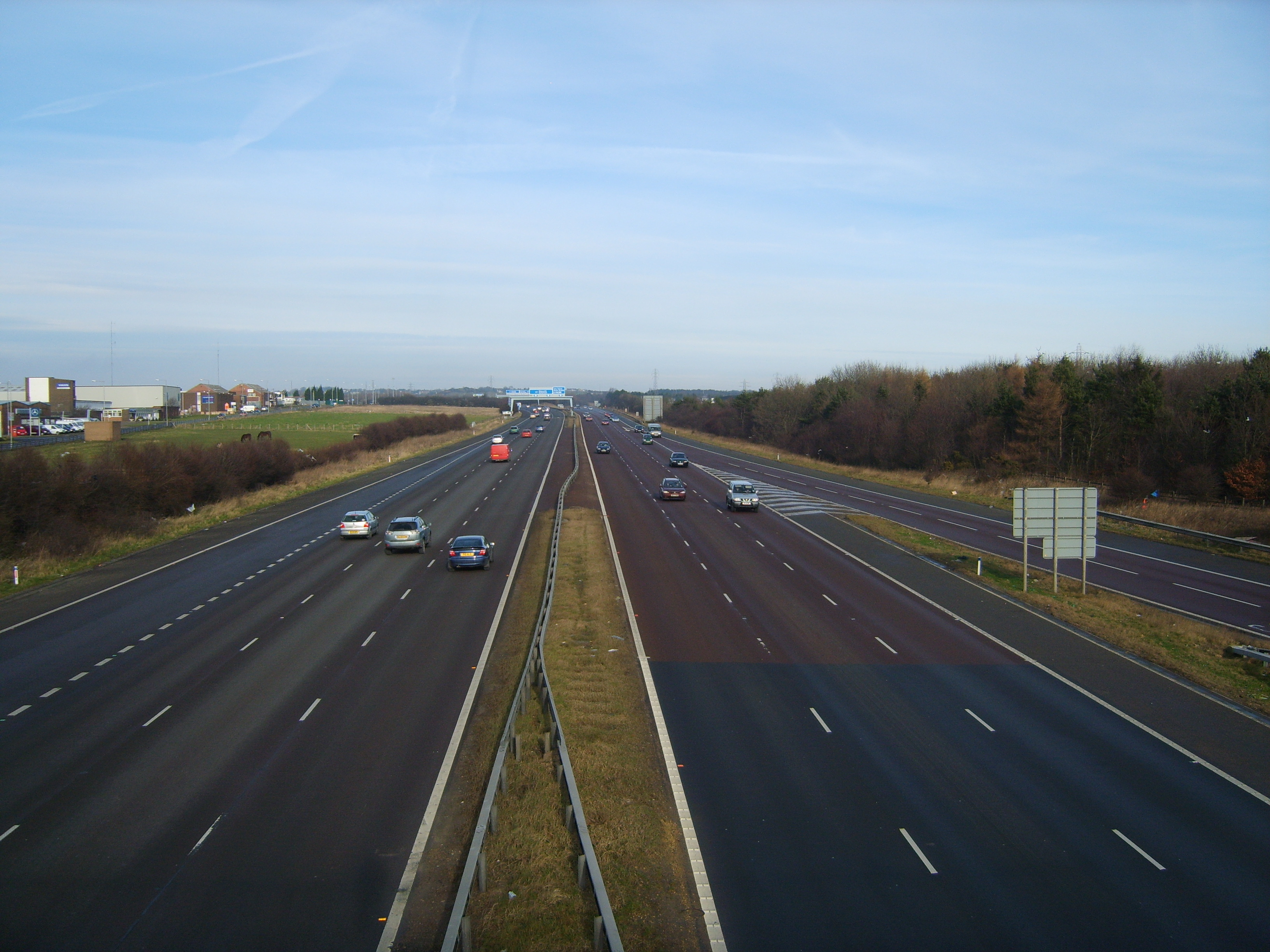
Looking northwards at Washington Services as the A1(M) approaches Junction 65

A1(M) is the designation given to a series of four separate motorway sections in the UK. Each section is an upgrade to a section of the A1, a major north–south road which connects London, the capital of England, with Edinburgh, the capital of Scotland. The first section, the Doncaster Bypass, opened in 1961 and is one of the oldest sections of motorway in Britain. Construction of a new section of A1(M) between Leeming and Barton was completed on 29 March 2018, a year later than the anticipated opening in 2017 due to extensive archaeological excavations. Its completion linked the Barton to Washington section with the Darrington to Leeming Bar section, forming the longest A1(M) section overall and reducing the number of sections from five to four.

Some sections, such as in Hertfordshire between J4 (Hertford) and J7 (Stevenage), were cheaply engineered by modern standards. Infrastructure budgets in the seventies were under pressure from the energy crisis and so some existing roads along the A1 route were built upon to avoid compulsory land purchases. This limited construction of cuttings or embankments, leaving the motorway with notable ascents at Digswell and Oaklands, for example.

In 2015, a proposal was made by three local government organisations to renumber the section of A1(M) between Micklefield and Washington as the M1, making this section a northern extension of the M1.

== Overview ==
Most of the English section of the A1 is a series of alternating sections of primary route, dual carriageway and motorway. From Newcastle upon Tyne to Edinburgh it is a trunk road with alternating sections of dual and single carriageway. The table below summarises the road as motorway and non-motorway sections. Most of the non-motorway sections do not have junction numbers, with the exception of the Newcastle Western Bypass which continues the junction numbering of the A1(M).

Road name	Junctions	Length		Ceremonial counties (England) Council areas (Scotland)	Primary destinations
Road name	Junctions	miles	km	Ceremonial counties (England) Council areas (Scotland)	Primary destinations
A1		16.58	26.680	Greater London; Hertfordshire	London; Edgware, Barnet, Borehamwood
A1(M)	1–10	24.14	38.840	Hertfordshire	Hertford; Stevenage
A1		26.25	42.240	Hertfordshire, Bedfordshire; Cambridgeshire	Bedford, Cambridge, Huntingdon
A1(M)	13–17	12.84	20.66	Cambridgeshire	Peterborough
A1		72.99	117.44	Cambridgeshire, Rutland; Lincolnshire; Nottinghamshire	Stamford, Grantham; Newark on Trent
A1(M)	34–38	15.13	24.34	Nottinghamshire; South Yorkshire	Worksop, Blyth, Doncaster, Rotherham, Barnsley
A1		7.51	12.08	South Yorkshire; West Yorkshire	Pontefract, Castleford, Wakefield
A1(M)	40–65	93.27	150.10	West Yorkshire; North Yorkshire; County Durham; Tyne and Wear	Selby, Leeds, York, Wetherby, Harrogate, Thirsk, Ripon, Catterick, Richmond, Scotch Corner, Darlington, Teesside, Bishop Auckland, Durham, Chester-le-Street, Stanley, Beamish, Birtley, Washington (Sunderland), Gateshead
A1	65-80 (Newcastle Western Bypass only)	128.29	206.42	Tyne and Wear; Northumberland; Scottish Borders; East Lothian; Edinburgh	Gateshead, Blaydon, Newcastle-upon-Tyne, Cramlington, Morpeth, Alnwick, Belford, Lindisfarne, Berwick-upon-Tweed, Eyemouth, Dunbar, Haddington, Tranent, Prestonpans, Musselburgh, Edinburgh
		397.00	638.78		

From London to Sunderland, 123.33 miles (198.48 km) of the route are non-motorway while the remaining 145.38 miles (233.97 km) are to motorway standards.

== South Mimms to Stotfold ==
A1(M) (J1–J10)

Route information
- Part of E15
- Maintained by National Highways
- Length: 24 mi (39 km)
- Existed: 1962–present
- History: Constructed 1962–1986

Major junctions
- South end: South Mimms
- North end: Stotfold

Location
- Country: United Kingdom
- Constituent country: England
- Primary destinations: Hatfield, Welwyn Garden City, Stevenage, Hitchin, Letchworth

Road network
- Roads in the United Kingdom; Motorways; A and B road zones

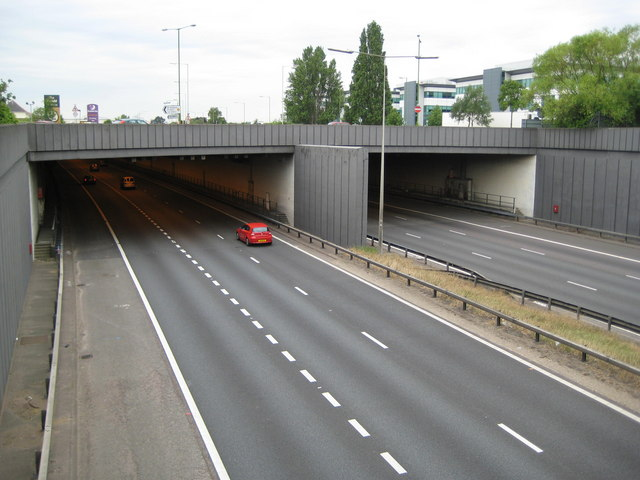
The northern portal of the Hatfield Tunnel

A1(M) motorway junctions South Mimms to Stotfold
km	Southbound exits (B carriageway)	Junction	Northbound exits (A carriageway)	Year opened
	Road continues as A1 to Central London	J1; Services	M25 (M1); Watford, Stansted, Potters Bar, South Mimms; Services Non-motorway traffic	1979
	M25 (M1); Heathrow, Watford, Stansted, Potters Bar; Barnet A1081; South Mimms services	J1; Services	Start of motorway	1979
	No Exit (Access slip road only)	J2	Welham Green A1001	1986
	St Albans A414; Welham Green A1001	J3	St Albans A414; Hatfield A1001	1986
	Hatfield Tunnel	Tunnel	Hatfield Tunnel	1986
	Hertford A414; Hatfield A1001; Welwyn Garden City A6129	J4	Hertford A414; Welwyn Garden City A6129	1973
	No Access or Exit	J5	No Exit (Access slip road only)	1973
	Welwyn Garden City, Welwyn A1000	J6	Welwyn A1000	1962
	Ware, Stevenage A602	J7	Stevenage A602	1962
	Hitchin; Stevenage (N) A602	J8	Hitchin; Stevenage (N) A602	1967
	Letchworth, Baldock A505	J9	Baldock, Letchworth A505	1967
	Entering Hertfordshire		Entering Bedfordshire	
	Start of motorway	J10; Services	Stotfold, Shefford A507; Baldock services	1967
	Baldock, Stotfold A507; Baldock Services Non-Motorway Traffic	J10; Services	Road continues as A1 to Alconbury The NORTH, Peterborough A1	1967

== Alconbury to Peterborough ==
A1(M) (J14–J17)

Route information
- Part of E15
- Maintained by National Highways
- Length: 13 mi (21 km)
- Existed: 1998–present
- History: Constructed 1998

Major junctions
- North end: Orton Southgate
- South end: Alconbury

Location
- Country: United Kingdom
- Constituent country: England
- Primary destinations: Peterborough

Road network
- Roads in the United Kingdom; Motorways; A and B road zones
→ A3(M)

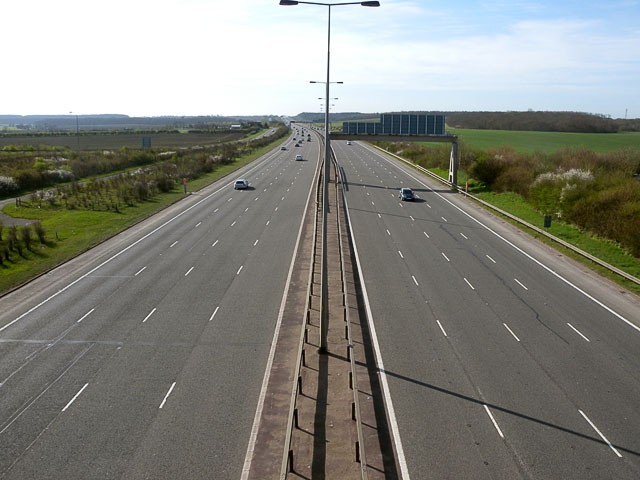
A1(M) southbound at Sawtry.

This section runs through the Cambridgeshire countryside between Alconbury and Peterborough. It was officially opened by Lord Whitty on 31 October 1998, and is the most isolated of the motorway sections as it connects with no other motorway. It is designed to a noticeably high standard, 8 miles (13 km) of it being four lanes from junction 14 at Alconbury to junction 16 at Norman Cross in each direction whilst the remainder has three lanes in each direction. It is managed by Road Management Services (Peterborough) under a DBFO contract with National Highways.

=== Junctions ===
A1(M) motorway junctions Alconbury to Peterborough
km	Southbound exits (B carriageway)	Junction	Northbound exits (A carriageway)
	Road continues as A1 to A14 and London	J14	The Alconburys, The Stukeleys B1043; Non-motorway traffic
	Huntingdon, St Ives (A 1307)	J14	Start of motorway
	Sawtry B1043; Sawtry services (unsigned southbound)	J15; Services	Sawtry B1043; Ramsey (B660); Sawtry services (fully signed northbound)
	Yaxley A15; Stilton (B1043); Ramsey (B660)	J16	Yaxley A15; Stilton (B1043)
	Start of motorway	J17; Services	Peterborough A1139; Wisbech (A47); Northampton, Oundle A605; Peterborough services
	Peterborough A1139; Wisbech (A47); Northampton, Oundle A605; Peterborough services Non-motorway traffic	J17; Services	Road continues as A1 to Doncaster The NORTH, Stamford A1

== Doncaster By-Pass (Blyth to Skellow) ==
A1(M) (J34–J38)

Route information
- Part of E15
- Maintained by National Highways
- Length: 15.2 mi (24.5 km)
- Existed: 1961–present
- History: Constructed 1961

Major junctions
- North end: Red House, near Skellow
- South end: Blyth

Location
- Country: United Kingdom
- Constituent country: England
- Primary destinations: Doncaster, Wakefield, Rotherham, Barnsley

Road network
- Roads in the United Kingdom; Motorways; A and B road zones
→ A3(M)

This 15-mile (24 km) section which runs from Skellow in South Yorkshire to the village of Blyth in the far north of Nottinghamshire first opened in 1961 and was one of the first sections of motorway to be built in Britain; it has two lanes in each direction. Between junction 36 and 37 the motorway crosses the River Don on the Don Bridge.

=== Junctions ===
Data from driver location signs are used to provide distance and carriageway identifier information.

A1(M) motorway junctions Blyth to Skellow
km	Southbound exits (B carriageway)	Junction	Northbound exits (A carriageway)
0.0	Road continues as A1 to Peterborough The SOUTH, Newark A1; Nottingham (A614)	J34; Services	Bawtry A614; Doncaster Sheffield; Non-motorway traffic Blyth services
0.0	Bawtry A614; Gainsborough (A631); Doncaster Sheffield; Blyth services	J34; Services	Start of motorway
	Entering Nottinghamshire		Entering South Yorkshire
12.0	M18; Sheffield (M1); Scunthorpe (M180); Doncaster Sheffield	J35	Doncaster M18; Sheffield (M1); Scunthorpe (M180); Hull (M62)
14.9	Rotherham, Doncaster A630	J36	Rotherham, Doncaster A630
20.3	Doncaster, Barnsley A635	J37	Doncaster, Barnsley A635
24.4	Start of motorway	J38	Wakefield A638
24.4	Doncaster, Wakefield A638; Non-motorway traffic	J38	Road continues as A1 to Darrington The NORTH A1; Leeds (M62)

== Skellow to Darrington (proposed) ==
Proposals were made by a previous government to upgrade the Skellow to Darrington section of the A1 to motorway, meaning the entire stretch of A1 from Blyth in Nottinghamshire to Washington in Tyne and Wear would be motorway-standard road.

== Darrington to Washington ==
A1(M) (J40–J65)

Route information
- Part of E15
- Maintained by National Highways
- Length: 93.8 mi (151.0 km)
- Existed: 1965–present
- History: Constructed 1965–2018

Major junctions
- South end: Darrington
- J41 → M62 motorway J43 → M1 motorway J57 → A66(M) motorway J65 → A194(M) motorway
- North end: Birtley

Location
- Country: United Kingdom
- Constituent country: England
- Primary destinations: Wetherby, Knaresborough, Ripon, Catterick, Scotch Corner, Darlington, Newton Aycliffe, Durham, Houghton le Spring, Chester-le-Street, Washington Road network

Road network
- Roads in the United Kingdom; Motorways; A and B road zones
→ A3(M)

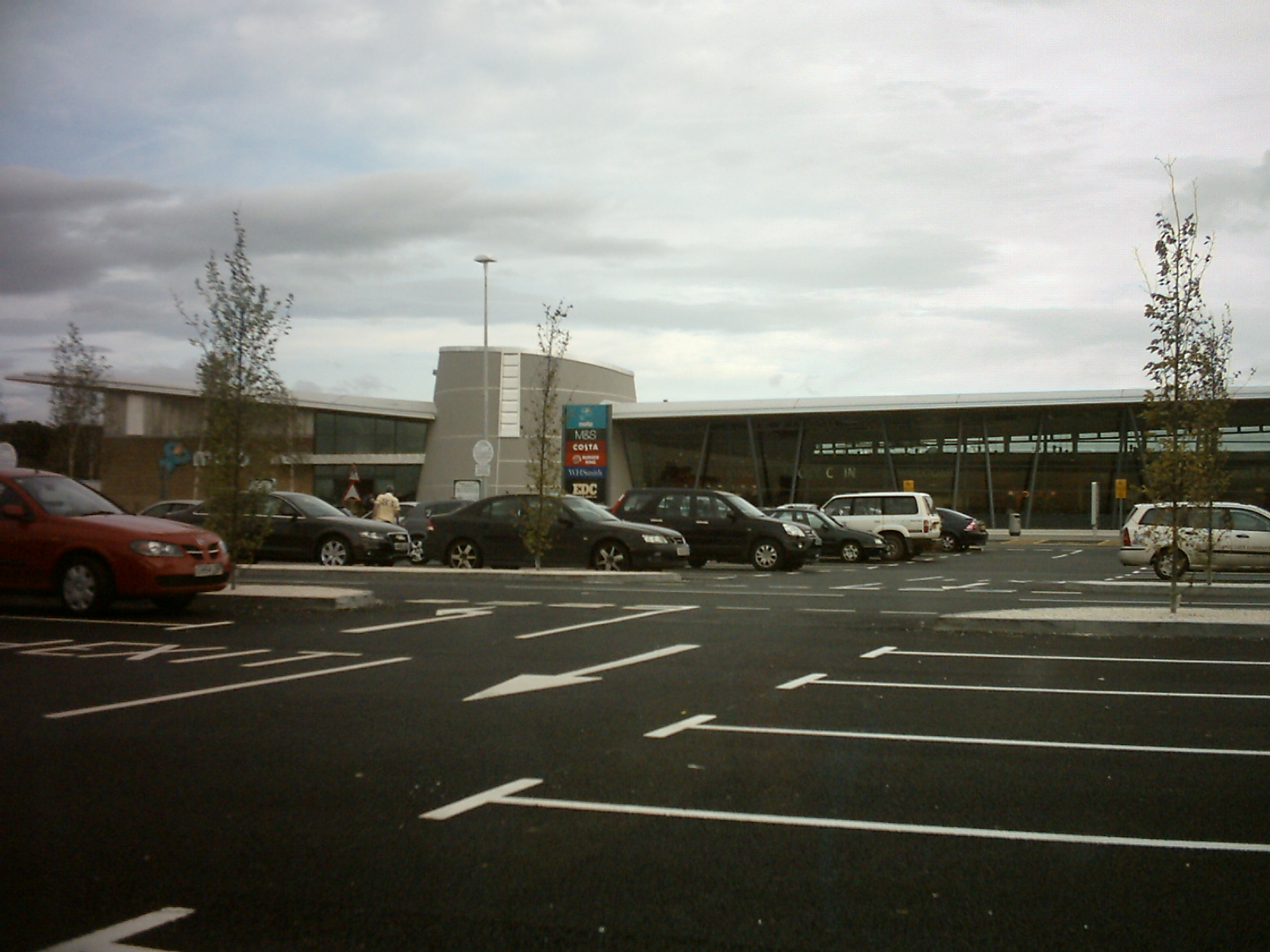
Wetherby Services on the A1(M).

This section opened in sections:

- Walshford to 49 opened in 1995
- Junctions 43 to 44 opened in 1999

When this section opened it ended at a temporary terminus south of the M1. There was a final exit into Micklefield Village for non-motorway traffic onto what is now the access road. During the first week of June 2009, junctions 44 and 45 were renumbered to 43 and 44. At the same time the existing A1/A659 Grange Moor junction became A1(M) junction 45. As a result many atlases show incorrect junction numbering for this stretch of motorway.

- Junction 46 to temporary junction at Walshford opened in 2005
- Junction 40 to south of 43 opened in 2005 and 2006

The northern section of the upgrade, bypassing Fairburn village, opened to traffic in April 2005 with a temporary connection with the existing A1 between Fairburn and Brotherton. The southern section, with a free-flow interchange with the M62 motorway, opened to traffic on 13 January 2006.

- Junctions 44 to 46 opened in 2009
- Junctions 49 to 51 opened in 2011 and 2012

Work began in March 2009 to upgrade the Dishforth to Leeming section to dual three-lane motorway standard with existing connections being replaced by two new junctions. The Dishforth to Baldersby Section (J49 to J50) was completed in October 2011 and the Baldersby to Leeming section (J50 to J51) was opened to traffic on 31 March 2012.

- Junctions 51 to 56 opened in 2017 and 2018 - there are no junctions 54 and 55

Work on upgrading the Leeming Bar to Barton section to three-lane motorway began in April 2014. Work was expected to be completed by summer 2017. In early 2017, the Highways Agency announced that the full opening would be delayed until December 2017. In the end, the motorway opened up on 29 March 2018, making the A1 continuous motorway standard from Darrington, West Yorkshire, to Washington, Tyne and Wear, though residual works were still to be completed.

- Junctions 56 to 59 opened in 1965
- Junctions 59 to 63 opened in 1969
- Junctions 63 to 65 opened in 1970

=== Junctions ===
Data from driver location signs are used to provide distance and carriageway identifier information.

A1(M) motorway junctions Darrington to Washington
km	Southbound exits (B carriageway)	Junction	Northbound exits (A carriageway)
36.5	Road continues as A1 to Doncaster The SOUTH A1; Doncaster (A638)	J40	Hull (M62); Pontefract A162 (A645); Non-motorway traffic Ferrybridge services
36.5	No access (on-ramp only)	J40	Start of motorway
41.1	Hull, Manchester M62; Ferrybridge services	J41	Manchester, Leeds M62
	Entering West Yorkshire		Entering North Yorkshire
46.7	Leeds, Selby A63	J42	Leeds, Selby A63
	Entering North Yorkshire		Entering West Yorkshire
	London, Leeds M1; Manchester (M62)	J43	No access (on-ramp only)
	Entering West Yorkshire		Entering North Yorkshire
55.3	York, Leeds (N) A64	J44	Leeds, York A64
	Entering North Yorkshire		Entering West Yorkshire
57.2	Wetherby A168; Otley A659	J45	Wetherby A168; Otley A659
	Entering West Yorkshire		Entering North Yorkshire
	York, Wetherby B1224; Wetherby services	J46; Services	Wetherby, York B1224; Wetherby services
79.3	York, Knaresborough, Harrogate, Leeds/Bradford A59	J47	Knaresborough, Harrogate, Leeds/Bradford, York A59
86.3	Boroughbridge A6055	J48	Boroughbridge A6055; Ripon (B6265); Dishforth A168
95.2	Thirsk A168; Teesside (A19)	J49	Thirsk A168; Teesside (A19)
102.8	Ripon, Thirsk A61	J50	Ripon, Thirsk A61
119.9	Northallerton, Leyburn A684; Bedale (B6285)	J51	Northallerton, Bedale A6055 (A684)
	Catterick A6055 (A6136)	J52	Catterick A6055 (A6136)
	Richmond A6055 (A6108); Penrith, Brough A66; Scotch Corner services	J53	Richmond A6055 (A6108); Penrith, Brough A66; Scotch Corner services
	Piercebridge B6275; Barton	J56	Piercebridge B6275; Barton
	No access (on-ramp only)	J57	Darlington, Teesside, Teesside A66(M)
	Entering North Yorkshire		Entering County Durham
	Corbridge, Darlington A68	J58	Darlington, Bishop Auckland, Corbridge A68
	Newton Aycliffe, Darlington A167	J59	Newton Aycliffe A167
	Bishop Auckland, Hartlepool, Teesside A689	J60	Bishop Auckland, Hartlepool, Teesside A689
	Spennymoor, Bishop Auckland A688; Peterlee A177; Durham services	J61; Services	Spennymoor A688; Peterlee A177; Durham services
	Sunderland, Durham A690; Consett (A691)	J62	Sunderland, Durham A690; Consett (A691)
	Chester-le-Street A167; Stanley A693	J63	Chester-le-Street A167; Stanley A693
	Entering County Durham		Entering Tyne and Wear
	Washington (S) A195	J64	Washington, Birtley A195
	Washington services	Services	Washington services
	Start of motorway	J65	Tyne Tunnel, South Shields A194(M)
	Sunderland, Washington A1231; Non-motorway traffic	J65	Road continues as A1 to Edinburgh Newcastle, Gateshead A1
