= Sunderland College =

Location
- Durham Road (A690); City of Sunderland, Tyne and Wear, SR3 4AH; England; 54.89276°N 1.40852°W

Information
- Type: Further and Higher Education College
- Local authority: Sunderland
- Department for Education URN: 131347 Tables
- Ofsted: Reports
- Principal: Ellen Thinnesen
- Age: 16+
- Website: https://www.sunderlandcollege.ac.uk/

Sunderland College, officially City of Sunderland College, is a further education and higher education college based in Sunderland, North East England. The enrolment includes around 6,300 part-time learners and approximately 4,800 full-time students. A report following a January 2010 Ofsted inspection awarded the school a Grade 2 (good) that included a Grade 1 (outstanding) on 3 inspection criteria. The college is a member of the Collab Group of high performing schools.

== About ==
The college is part of Education Partnership North East, a large multi campus college group with seven campuses throughout North East England, these are Bede Campus, City Campus, Washington Campus, Ashington Campus, Kirkley Hall Campus, Hartlepool Sixth Form Campus, and HICSA, a housing innovation and construction skills academy.

== History ==
Sunderland College originally had two more campuses: Shiney Row College and Hylton Centre, until their demolitions. Shiney Row Campus was impacted by a major fire in 2015.

=== Bede Campus ===
The college's Bede Campus, which is situated close to Sunderland City Centre on Durham Road (A690), is in the buildings of the former Bede School which began as Sunderland Higher Grade School in 1890 (near the West Park, now the site of Sunderland Civic Centre). In 1905 the school was renamed Bede Collegiate School, with separate Boys and Girls' Schools, and in 1927 the foundation stones were laid for new school buildings on Durham Road, current site of Bede Campus of Sunderland College. Following the Education Act 1944 the two schools became Grammar Schools: the Girls' School had around 500 girls in the 1950s, and by the 1960s the Boys' School had over 900 boys. In 1971, Bede School became a co-educational non-selective Comprehensive School, closing in 1991 a year after celebrating its centenary. Both the Boys' and Girls' Schools of the original school and the successor Comprehensive School were referred to, locally, as Bede School or 'The Bede'.

Bede Campus is the specialist centre for health and care, digital, A-Levels, sports and visual and performing arts courses.

It is home to a dedicated sixth form for academic study, science labs, health simulation ward, digital suite, Sports Academy and £11 million Arts Academy. The campus also includes a Goals Soccer Centre with all-weather 3G 5-a-side pitches.

=== City Campus ===
In Sunderland, the £30 million City Campus has equipment for vocational study from specialist construction and engineering workshops to a simulated aircraft for Travel and Tourism students. In addition there is commercial hair, barbering and beauty salons, a travel agency, restaurant and kitchens.

=== Washington Campus ===
In September 2006, Sunderland College opened its new £10 million Washington campus on Stone Cellar Road in Washington, Tyne and Wear. It is on the site of the former Usworth School just off the A195 near the junction with the A194(M) in Usworth and Concord. Washington is in process of being repurposed.

=== HICSA Campus ===
HISCA (Home Innovation and Construction Skills Academy) was first planned in 2021, and construction began in December 2023, and officially opened on 7 November 2025. The campus is located on a former engine shed at Monkwearmouth, just outside of the Stadium of Light and Sunderland City Centre. The site offers wooden housing construction in a workshop space, and has a support needs area and cafe on site.

=== Education Partnership North East ===
Sunderland College merged with Hartlepool Sixth Form College in September 2017, and in March 2019 Northumberland College merged with Sunderland College. This created Education Partnership North East, one of the largest college groups in the country.

== Facilities ==
Each of the college's centres has its own Learning Centre where students can have access to networked computers, borrow books from the library, or a quiet place to study. Refectories, cafes, shops and common rooms are all available at each of the campuses.

There is also access to the media facilities and libraries of the University of Sunderland

== Notable alumni ==
- George Clarke - architect and television presenter
- The Futureheads - English post-punk band from Sunderland
- Lauren Laverne - TV/radio personality and former presenter of the BBC's The Culture Show
- Gareth Pugh - fashion designer
- Jonathan Reynolds, Secretary of State for Business and Trade

=== Bede Grammar School for Boys ===
- Don Airey, musician, Deep Purple, Whitesnake, Ozzy Osbourne
- Alan Brien, journalist and novelist
- Sir David Cairns, Lord Justice of Appeal
- Prof Alan Cowey, Professor of Physiological Psychology at the University of Oxford, and President of the European Brain and Behaviour Society
- Sir Tom Cowie, transport entrepreneur
- Rod Culbertson, actor
- Samuel Newby Curle, mathematician
- Derek Foster, Baron Foster of Bishop Auckland, Labour MP for Bishop Auckland
- David George Galliford, Bishop of Bolton
- Sydney Goldstein, aerodynamicist and Professor of Mathematics at the Victoria University of Manchester
- Sir David Harrison, Vice-Chancellor of the University of Exeter and the University of Keele
- Marcus Lipton, Labour MP for Brixton from 1945 to 1974, then Lambeth Central from 1974 to 1978
- Prof James McFarlane, Professor of European Literature from 1964 to 1982 at the University of East Anglia
- Nigel Olsson, musician, Elton John Band
- David Parfitt, film producer
- David Rock, architect and President of the RIBA
- Dave Stewart, musician, Eurythmics
- Sir James Taylor, physicist and President of the Institute of Physics
- Neville Thurlbeck, chief reporter for News of the World
- Alan Woodruff, Wellcome Professor of Clinical Tropical Medicine at the London School of Hygiene & Tropical Medicine
