= A1300 road =

Road in Tyne and Wear, England

Coordinates: 54.96956°N 1.42627°W

A1300

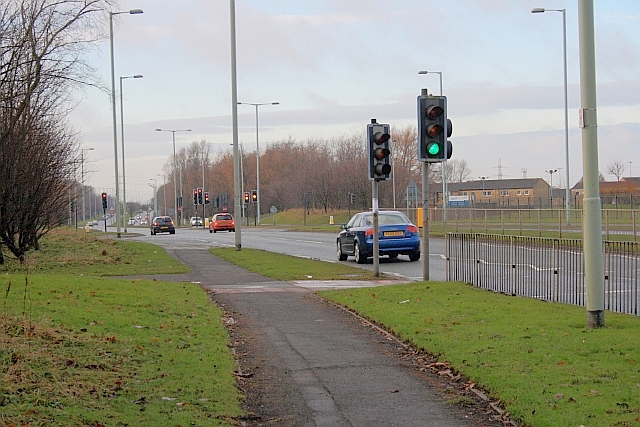
- A1300, John Reid Road

Route information
- Length: 3.7 mi (6.0 km)

Major junctions
- East end: A194 Leam Lane/Hadrian Road in Simonside
- A194 A1018 A183
- West end: A183 Coast Road in Marsden

Location
- Country: United Kingdom

Road network
- Roads in the United Kingdom; Motorways; A and B road zones

The A1300 is the main 'cross town' route in South Shields, Tyne and Wear. The road runs from Simonside to Marsden via Harton Nook. It is 3.7 miles (6 km) long.

== Route ==
=== John Reid Road ===
The A1300 begins as the John Reid Road at the junction with the A194. The road proceeds as Dual carriageway through Simonside, Brockley Whins, Biddick Hall and West Harton before passing South Tyneside District Hospital and Temple Memorial Park.

=== Prince Edward Road ===
The duel carriageway ends at the A1018 King George Road Roundabout, and becomes a single carriage way called Prince Edward Road, which features a long parade of shops in an area known as The Nook.

The Prince Edward Road continues after The Nook for 1 mile into Marsden before a roundabout connecting Marsden Lane (B1301) and Lizard Lane.

=== Redwell Lane ===
The road then becomes Redwell Lane and meets the Coast Road (A183) on the coast at Marsden.

== History ==
The current route of the A1300 was originally the B1300, although when the Tyne Tunnel was completed, they decided to upgrade the B1300 to A-road status, to make easier access to South Shields town centre.

The section known as John Reid Road was named after Lieut.-Col. John Reid, O.B.E., M.I.C.E., who served as the Borough Engineer for over 30 years. Construction began in 1963, and the road was officially opened on 27 April 1965 by Lord Lindgren, then Joint Parliamentary Secretary to the Ministry of Transport. During the ceremony, around 200 residents protested for safer pedestrian access, which led the council to commit to a subway crossing at a cost of £18,000. Reid retired shortly thereafter and was honoured for his decades of service to the borough.
