= Samuel Newby Curle =

British mathematician

Samuel Newby Curle FRSE (1930-1989) was a British mathematician. He served as Professor of Applied Mathematics at St Andrews University from 1967 until 1989. St Andrews University created the Curle Lecture in his memory.

== Life ==
He was born in Sunderland, County Durham, on 18 June 1930 the son of Samuel Curle and his wife, Edith Newby Holmes. He attended Barnes School in Sunderland and then Bede Grammar School (now Sunderland College). He then attended Manchester University graduating BSc in 1951 and MSc in 1952. He received a PhD in 1955.

In 1954 he began working at the National Physical Laboratory then in 1961 moved to the University of Southampton as a Reader in Mathematics. In 1967 he was given the Gregory Chair of Mathematics at St Andrews University.

He was elected a Fellow of the Royal Society of Edinburgh in 1977. His proposers were Andrew G Mackie, Norrie Everitt, Douglas Samuel Jones and Donald C Pack.

He died of heart disease on 27 June 1989 in Settle, North Yorkshire in England, and was buried in Kirkcaldy in Fife.

== Family ==
In 1956 he married Shirley Kingsford Campion.

== The Curle Lecture ==
In 2006 St Andrews University instituted the Curle Lecture in his memory. This is a biennial lecture on an entertaining way of presenting mathematical concepts.

The first lecture 1089 and All That was given by Dr David Acheson of Jesus College, Oxford.

== Publications ==
- The Laminar Boundary Layer Equations (1962) reprinted 1965
