= A1018 road =

Road in Tyne and Wear

A1018

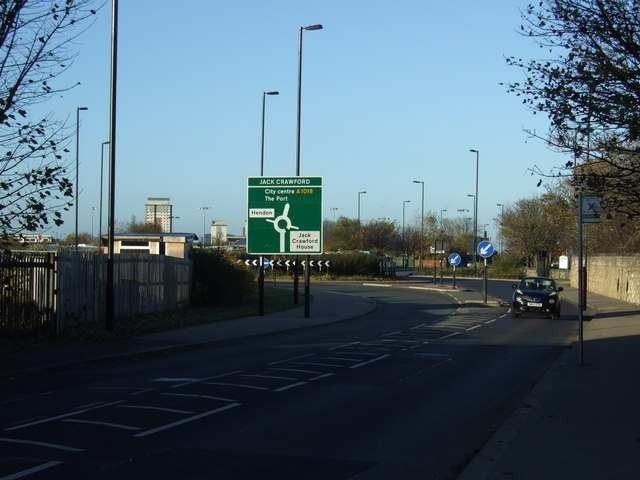
- Commercial Road (A1018)

Route information
- Length: 13.4 mi (21.6 km)

Major junctions
- North end: A183, South Shields
- A183 A194 A1300 A184; A19
- South end: A19, Seaham

Location
- Country: United Kingdom
- Primary destinations: Sunderland

Road network
- Roads in the United Kingdom; Motorways; A and B road zones
← A1017	→ A1019

The A1018 is a road in North East England. It runs between South Shields, at the mouth of the River Tyne, and the A19 near Seaham, County Durham. Most of the route it follows is the old alignment of the A19, before it by-passed Sunderland to meet the Tyne Tunnel.

== Route ==
=== South Tyneside section ===
The road begins in the centre of South Shields, at the local town hall, with A183 and A194, as Westoe Road. At the junction with the B1298, the road becomes a one-way system, with southbound traffic continuing to use Westoe Road and turning right onto the B1301 Dean Road and northbound traffic using the more direct route of Imeary Street. The A1018 continues on Sunderland Road before becoming King George Road and a dual carriageway. The road crosses the A1300 and continues to a roundabout with Nevinson Avenue. Here, the road becomes Shields Road and returns to a single-carriageway. The A1018 then extends through Cleadon Village, re-becoming Sunderland Road, and runs to the Sunderland border, passing the AFC Sunderland academy training ground.

=== Sunderland section ===
As the A1018 enters the City of Sunderland from the north, it is known as Shields Road, which then becomes Newcastle Road. This long straight section passes through the Boldons, Fulwell and Monkwearmouth towards the River Wear.

Newcastle Road ends at a large roundabout. The road runs along Roker Avenue and then Church Street North. At this point, the A1018 merges with the A183 road and become Dame Dorothy Street which crosses the Wearmouth Bridge into the Sunderland city centre.

On the south side of the Wear, the A1018 heads east toward Hendon as West Wear Street and then Sans Street, and then continues through Hendon via West Wear Street, Hendon Road and Commercial Road into Grangetown as the Southern Radial Route. It bypasses Ryhope to meet Stockton Road at the Wellfield Roundabout.

=== Sunderland Southern Radial Route ===
The Southern Radial Route provides a fast and direct route from the south of Ryhope Village towards Sunderland City Centre.

The former route of the A1018, Ryhope Road, was renumbered to the B1522 and will be converted to a No Car Lane between Grangetown and Park Lane Interchange. On Ryhope Road, two of the current four lanes of road will be used for cars, and the other two for mixed traffic excluding cars.
