= Ian Pattison (cricketer) =

English cricketer

Ian Pattison (born 5 May 1982) is an English cricketer. He was a right-handed batsman and a right-arm medium-pace bowler who played for Durham.

Pattison made four Youth Test appearances for England Under-19s, at the 2000 Under-19 World Cup, while still seventeen years of age. Following this, in 2000 and 2001 he played in Under-19 tours involving Sri Lanka and India.

Pattison played his debut County Championship match during the 2002 season, an appearance which included a painfully slow innings of 6 runs, and a second-ball duck which did little for his confidence, and he only played two further games in the season. Worse was to come as he played only once in the following 18 months, following Durham's bottom placing in the 2002 County Championship Second Division, despite 2003 being a slightly better year for the team. The following year, he played three early matches in the season, but was released at the end of the campaign, as Durham once again finished rooted to the bottom of the league.

Pattison played his final match for Durham's Second XI in August 2004, and merely a week later he joined North East Premier League team Gateshead Fell, alongside team-mates including former county cricketer Nick Phillips. He has played for the last four seasons in the MCCA Trophy competition. Pattison still plays cricket as of 2007 - his latest appearances, for his new team Northumberland, who he joined at the beginning of 2006, come more than seven years after first making his name at the Youth World Cup. He is currently playing for Seaham Harbour in the NEPL second division as captain after joining at the start of the 2014 season.

== Early life ==
Pattison was born in Ryhope, Sunderland and went on to attend Seaham Comprehensive School (now Seaham High School).
