= Lewis Atkinson =

British Labour politician

Lewis Atkinson MP
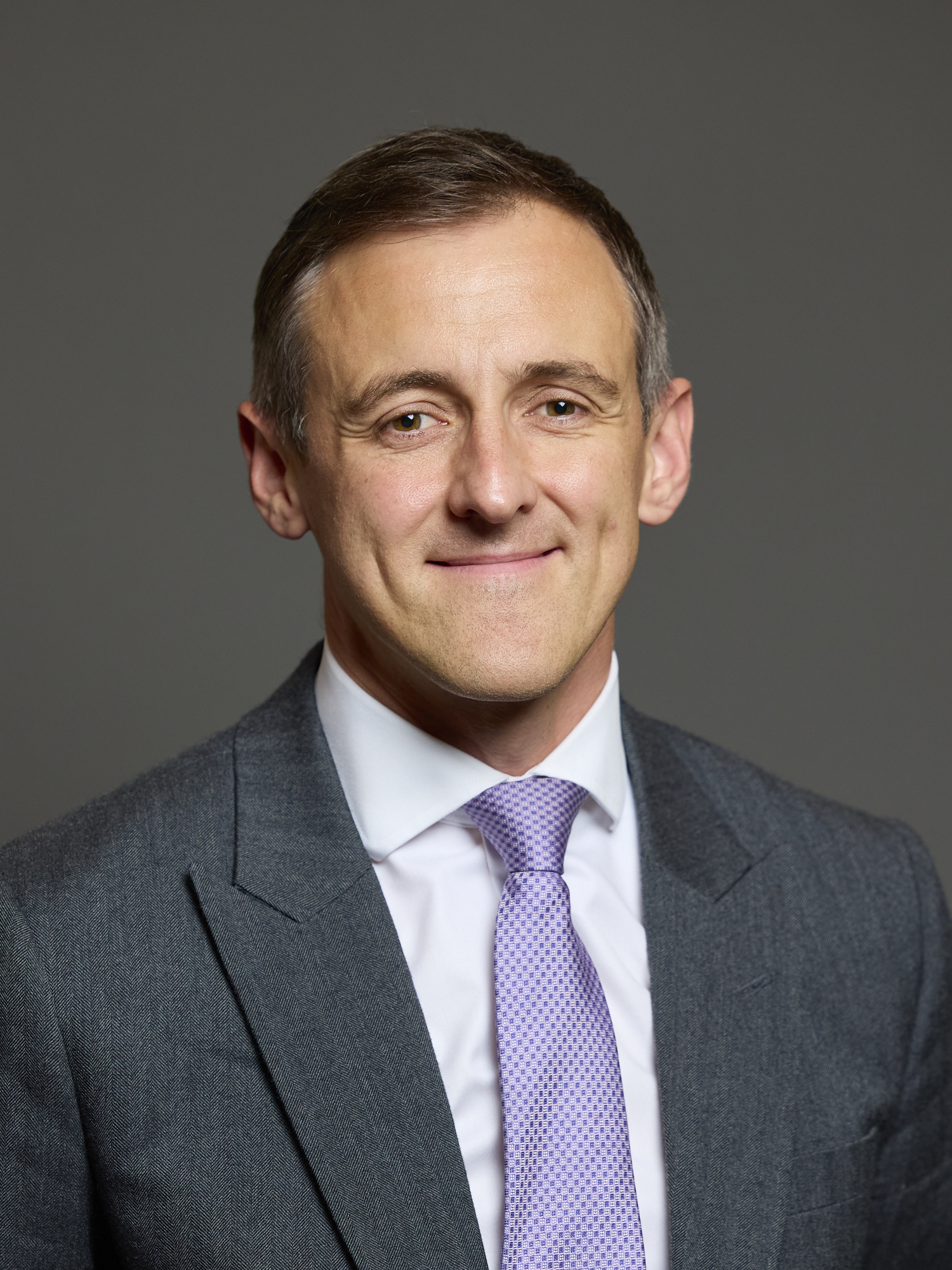
- Official portrait, 2024

Member of Parliament for Sunderland Central
- Incumbent
- Assumed office 4 July 2024
- Preceded by: Julie Elliott
- Majority: 6,073 (15.2%)

Personal details
- Born: Lewis Malcolm Atkinson; 1982 or 1983 (age 43–44) South Shields, England
- Party: Labour
- Children: 2
- Education: Wadham College, Oxford; University of Birmingham

Lewis Malcolm Atkinson (born 1989) is a British Labour Party politician and former NHS manager who has served as Member of Parliament (MP) for Sunderland Central since 2024.

== Early life and education ==
Atkinson was born in South Shields and was brought up in South Tyneside and educated at the King’s School, Tynemouth, where he studied French at A level, among other subjects. He studied at Wadham College, Oxford, where he studied Philosophy, politics and economics, and at the University of Birmingham, where he earned a master's degree in healthcare leadership and management.

== Career ==
Before politics, Atkinson worked as a manager in the NHS.

In January 2012, Atkinson announced that he would run to be on the Labour Party National Executive Committee. In 2013, he was shortlisted to stand in South Shields, but was not ultimately selected.

Incumbent MP for Sunderland Central, Julie Elliott announced that she would not seek reelection at the 2024 general election. Three days later on 30 May 2024, Atkinson was selected as the Labour Party candidate for the constituency. He was elected in the 2024 general election, winning the seat with 16,852 votes (42.18% of the vote) with a majority of 15.2%.

Atkinson was elected to the Home Affairs Select Committee in October 2025.

== Personal life ==
Lewis Atkinson is divorced and has 2 children.

== See also ==
- List of MPs elected in the 2024 United Kingdom general election

Parliament of the United Kingdom
Preceded by Julie Elliott	Member of Parliament for Sunderland Central; 2024–present	Incumbent
