= Julie Elliott =

British politician (born 1963)

The Right Honourable The Baroness Elliott of Whitburn Bay
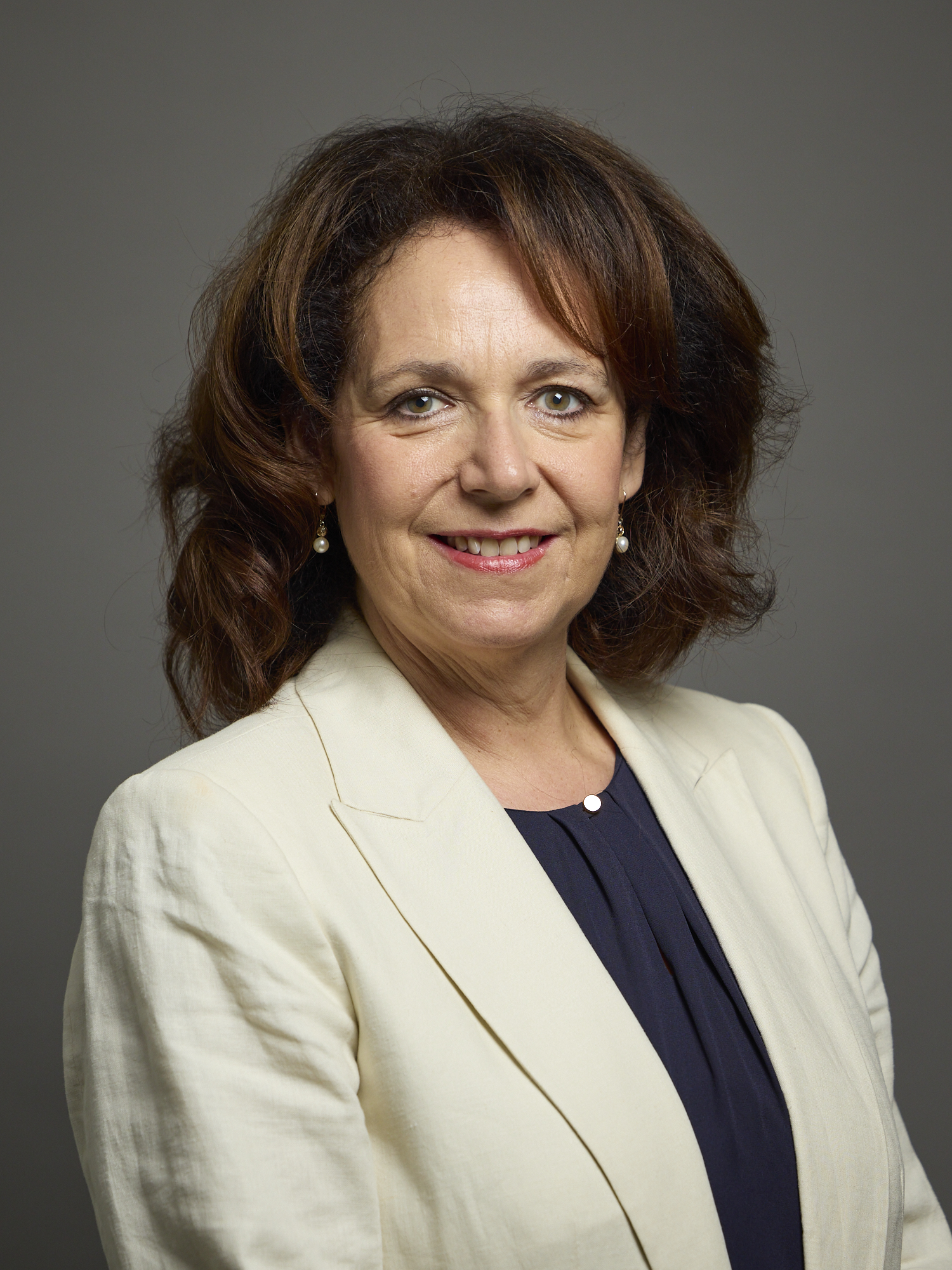
- Official portrait, 2025

Member of the House of Lords
- Lord Temporal
- Life peerage 27 January 2025

Member of Parliament for Sunderland Central
- In office 6 May 2010 – 30 May 2024
- Preceded by: New constituency
- Succeeded by: Lewis Atkinson
Shadow portfolios
2013–2015	Energy and Climate Change

Personal details
- Born: Julie Elliott; 29 July 1963 (age 63) Sunderland, England
- Party: Labour
- Spouse: Andy Fletcher (m. 2021)
- Children: 4
- Education: Newcastle Polytechnic (BA)

Julie Elliott, Baroness Elliott of Whitburn Bay (born 29 July 1963), is a British Labour Party politician who served as Member of Parliament (MP) for Sunderland Central from 2010 to 2024. Elliott served as Shadow Minister for Energy and Climate Change from 2013 to 2015, with specific responsibility for renewable energy, the Green Investment Bank, and skills and supply chain issues. She was a member of the European Scrutiny; Business, Innovation and Skills; Digital, Culture, Media and Sport; and Regulatory Reform Committees. Elliott stood down as an MP at the 2024 general election and was subsequently appointed to the House of Lords in 2025.

== Early life and education ==
Julie Elliott was born in Whitburn, South Tyneside, on 29 July 1963. Her father, Harold, served as an apprentice joiner at Sunderland Shipbuilders before working as a blacksmith striker at Wearmouth Colliery.

Elliott was educated at Seaham Northlea Comprehensive School, and later gained a Bachelor of Arts (BA) degree in government and public policy at Newcastle Polytechnic.

== Professional career ==
Elliott served as a school governor for Whitburn Comprehensive from 1991 to 2004, including a stint as chair. She also served as a governor at primary schools across Sunderland and South Tyneside.

She worked for the National Asthma Campaign in 1998 and 1999 as a regional organiser. From 1999 to 2010, Elliott became a regional organizer for the trade union GMB, responsible for political matters, representing members in employment tribunals and regional pay negotiations.

== Political career ==
=== House of Commons ===
Elliott became a member of the Labour Party in 1984 and worked as a regional organizer from 1993 to 1998. She served as an election agent for Tynemouth at the 1997 general election.

Elected as MP for Sunderland Central at the 2010 general election with a majority of 6,725, Elliott served on the European Scrutiny Committee and the Business, Innovation and Skills Committee.

In October 2013, Elliott became a shadow minister for the Department for Energy and Climate Change, with specific responsibility for renewable energy. She also served as the parliamentary private secretary to Caroline Flint.

Elliott was re-elected as MP for Sunderland Central at the 2015 general election with an increased majority of 11,179 votes. Following her departure from the frontbench in September 2015, she became a member of the Culture, Media and Sport Committee. She nominated Liz Kendall in the 2015 Labour Party leadership election and Caroline Flint in the deputy leadership election. Elliott was elected as chair of the Parliamentary Labour Party's Backbench Housing and Planning Committee in November 2015, and served as a member of the National Policy Forum. She endorsed Owen Smith in the failed attempt to replace Jeremy Corbyn in the 2016 Labour Party (UK) leadership election.

Elliott was re-elected as MP for Sunderland Central at the 2017 general election with a slightly reduced majority of 9,997 votes, and again at the 2019 general election with a smaller majority of 2,964 votes. In addition to the Digital, Culture, Media and Sport Committee, Elliott also served on the Regulatory Reform Committee from 2017 to 2021 and the Panel of Chairs from 2020 to 2024.

Elliott nominated Jess Phillips in the 2020 Labour Party leadership election and Ian Murray in the deputy leadership election.

In the House of Commons, Elliott voted in favour of the removal of hereditary peers from the House of Lords, equal gay rights, and same-sex marriage. She voted against university tuition fees, proposed reductions in spending on welfare benefits and culling badgers to tackle bovine tuberculosis. Elliott campaigned to remain in the European Union and consistently voted against withdrawal agreements put forward to Parliament despite her constituents voting to leave.

On 28 May 2024, Elliott announced that she would stand down at the 2024 general election.

=== House of Lords ===
In late 2024, Elliott was nominated for a life peerage by Prime Minister Keir Starmer. She was created Baroness Elliott of Whitburn Bay, of Whitburn Bay in the City of Sunderland, on 27 January 2025, and was introduced to the House of Lords on 10 February.

=== Campaigns ===
Elliott took on roles in several campaigns over the decades, both before and after becoming an MP.

While working with the National Asthma Campaign in 1998, Elliott urged the government to ban smoking in public places. She later worked with the GMB to change the law around compensation paid to victims of asbestos-related diseases, led a campaign against the use of zero-hour contracts in 2013.

After becoming an MP, Elliott joined forces with the Sunderland Echo to campaign against the closure of Sunderland Central Fire Station in 2014. She campaigned for a transformation of Sunderland's "rundown railway station" and for a new court complex for the city.

During the 2016 Brexit referendum, Elliott supported the campaign for the United Kingdom to remain in the European Union.

== Personal life ==
Elliott has one son and three daughters. On 21 August 2021, she married her long-term partner Andy Fletcher.

After standing down as an MP, Elliott was named a pro-chancellor of the University of Sunderland. She is scheduled to assume the role in July 2025.

Parliament of the United Kingdom
New constituency	Member of Parliament for Sunderland Central; 2010–2024	Succeeded by Lewis Atkinson
Political offices
Preceded by Luciana Berger	Shadow Minister for Sustainable Energy; 2013–2015	Succeeded by Alan Whitehead; Clive Lewis
