= Sunderland City Centre =

Central business district of Sunderland, Tyne & Wear, England

- Suburb
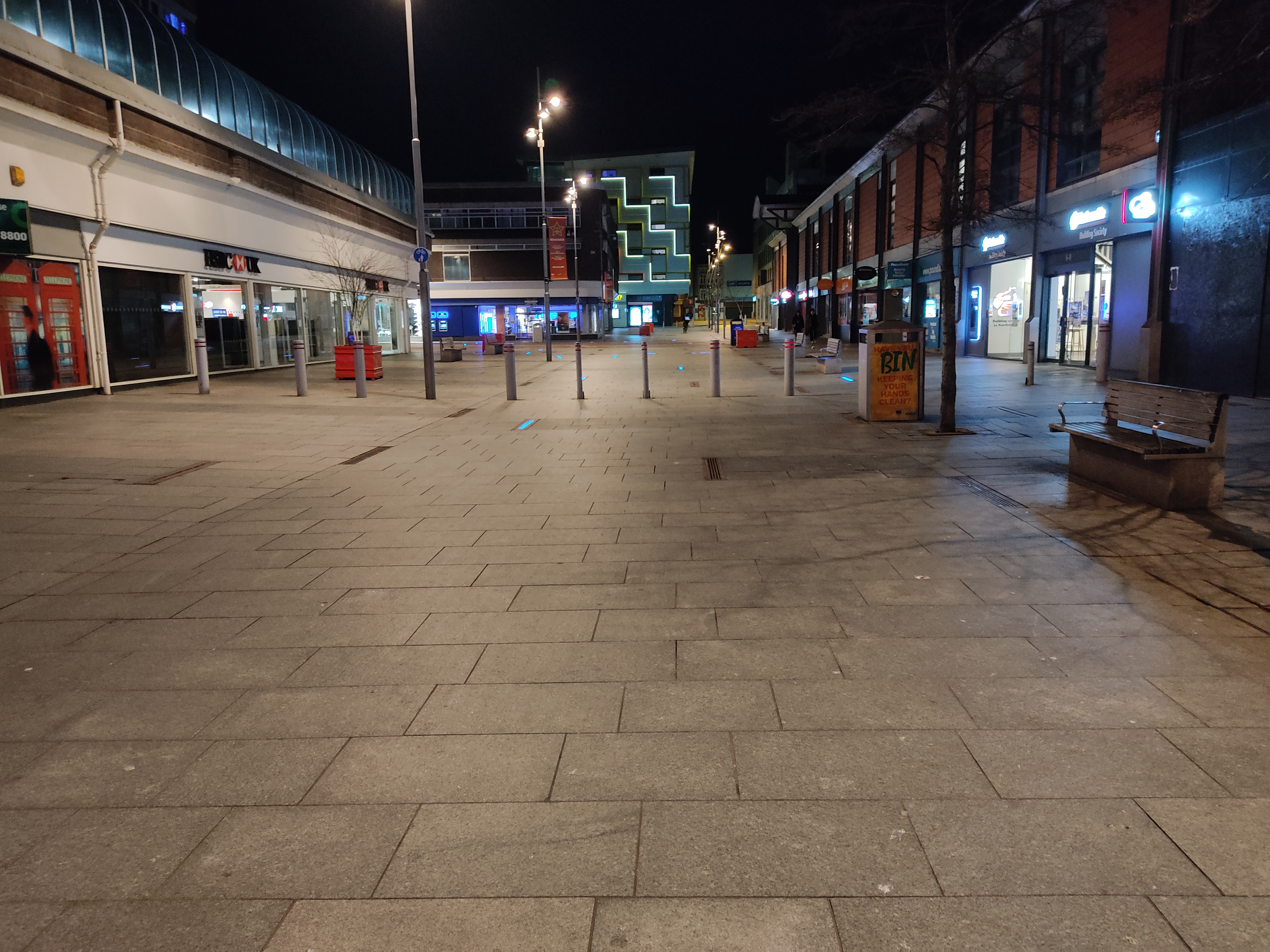
- Market Square at night
- Interactive map of Sunderland City Centre
- Coordinates: 54°54′28.8″N 1°21′36.0″W
- Country: United Kingdom
- Borough: Sunderland
- County: Tyne and Wear
- Westminster constituency: Sunderland Central

Sunderland City Centre is the central business district in Sunderland, Tyne and Wear, England. The city centre is just to the west of Sunderland Docks.

== History ==
In 2020 it was announced that 14 million would be spent on a new car park in the city centre.

== Districts ==
=== Market ===
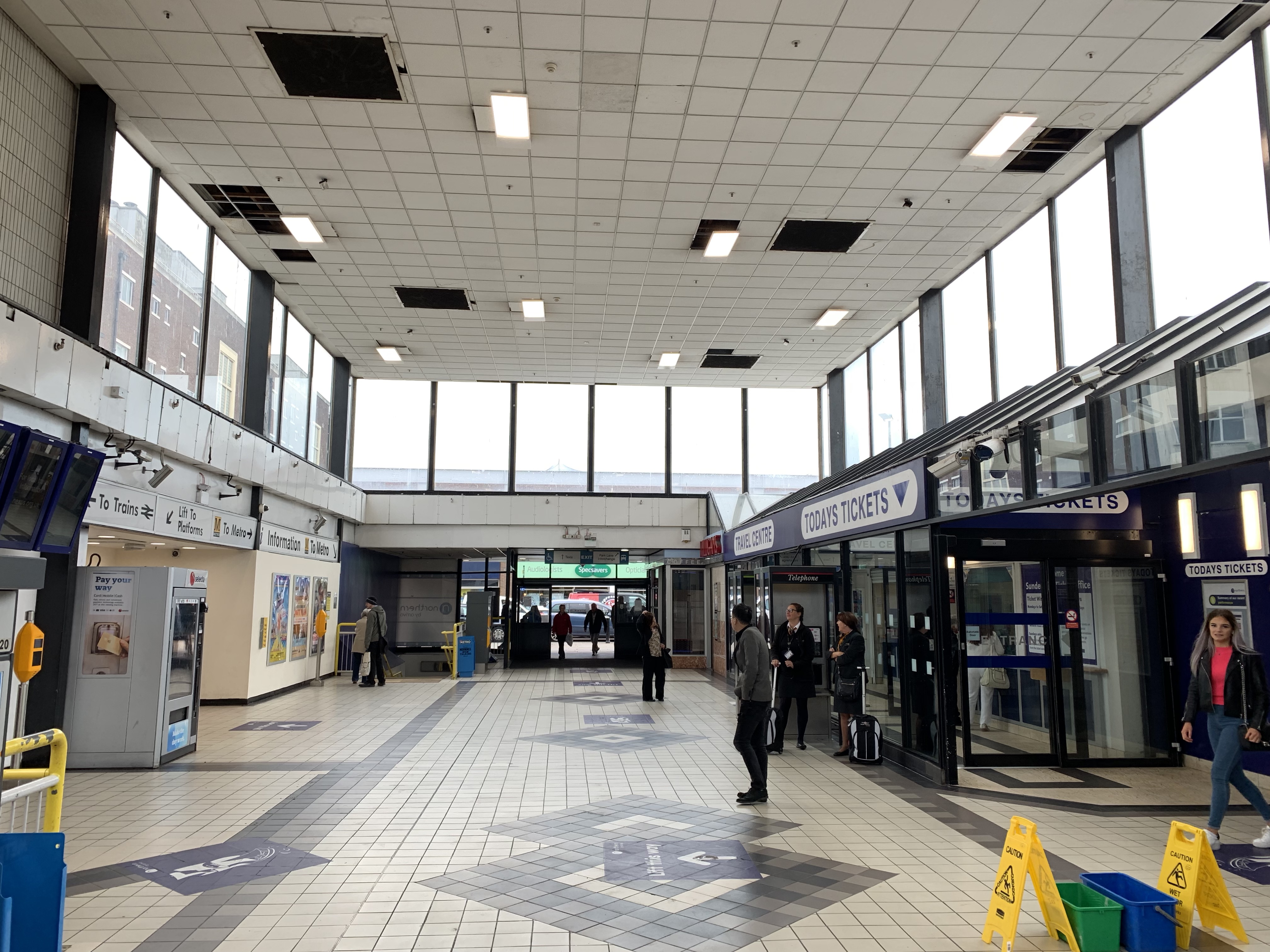
Sunderland station

The city centre’s main area, it extends south from the Wear to the A1231, including Sunderland's major shops. It contains the market square, Elephant Tea Rooms, Sunderland station, High Street West and The Bridges Shopping Centre. The former Sunderland Civic Centre site is being redeveloped.

=== Monkwearmouth ===
Monkwearmouth is north of the River Wear. It is best known for being the home of the Stadium of Light, St Peter’s Church and the University of Sunderland St Peter’s campus. The area is mainly made up of residential properties and light industry, and to the north merges into outer residential areas.

=== Bishopwearmouth ===
Bishopwearmouth is the western end of the centre. Known for being the home of the city hall, magistrates court, Keel Square, minster and the University of Sunderland city campus. The area’s west merges into outer residential areas.

=== Hendon ===
Hendon is the centre’s east end. It is home to the Town Moor, Sunderland Docks and the former Sunderland Barracks. The area’s north is also called the East End while to the south it merges into outer residential areas.

=== Sunniside ===
Sunniside is the centre’s closest residential area. With merchant terraces and Mowbray Park to the south. It extents from Fawcett Street to the A1018. The area contains Sunderland Empire Theatre and the Sunderland Museum and Winter Gardens.

== Politics ==
Sunderland City Centre is part of the Sunderland Central parliamentary constituency.

For local elections, it is currently divided between three wards of the city council. The majority of the city centre, lying to the west of Fawcett Street and the north of Holmeside, is located in Millfield ward. The eastern parts of the centre beyond Fawcett Street form part of Hendon ward, while the south of the city centre around Park Lane is within St Michael's ward.
