= A194 road =

Road in Tyne and Wear, England

A194

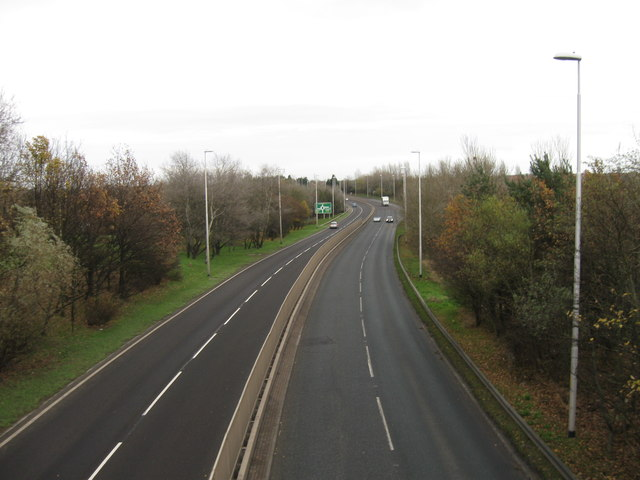
- Leam Lane in Jarrow, part of the A194

Route information
- Length: 5.0 mi (8.0 km)

Major junctions
- From: Washington
- A194(M) A184 A1300 A185 A183 A1018
- To: South Shields

Location
- Country: United Kingdom
- Primary destinations: Washington, Jarrow, South Shields

Road network
- Roads in the United Kingdom; Motorways; A and B road zones

The A194 road is a road in Tyne and Wear, England. It runs northeast from its start at junction 65 of the A1(M) near Washington, and the first 3 miles (4.8 km) are motorway standard, designated the A194(M). There are intermediate junctions with the A182 and the A195 before the motorway section ends at the A184 junction. The junctions were unnumbered until 2013 when they were designated J1 to J3.

The A194 continues as a trunk road to its next major junction, the A19 which provides access to the Tyne Tunnel, Sunderland and Teesside. At this point, A194 ceases to be a trunk road and continues to its terminus in South Shields town centre. The A194(M) was renamed A1(M) and then renamed back, the only motorway to be renamed back to its original name.

A194(M)
- A194(M) highlighted in blue
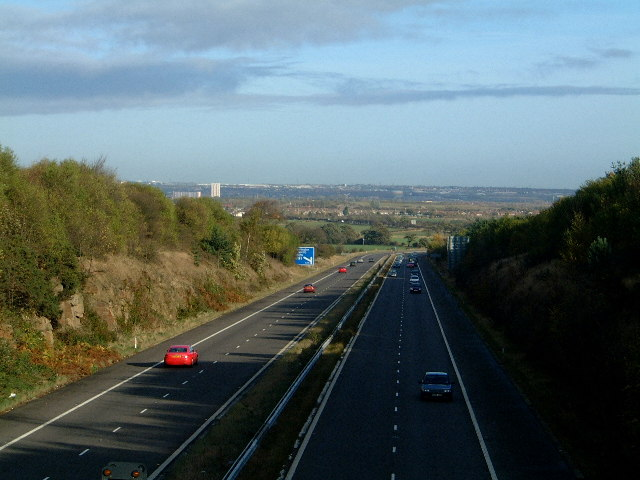
- Looking north with Tyneside coming into view

Route information
- Maintained by National Highways
- Length: 4.0 mi (6.4 km)
- Existed: 1975–present

Major junctions
- From: Washington; 54.8998°N 1.5596°W
- A1(M) motorway J1 -> A182 road J2 -> A195 road A194 road
- To: South Shields; 54.9946°N 1.4301°W

Location
- Country: United Kingdom

Road network
- Roads in the United Kingdom; Motorways; A and B road zones
← A167(M)	→ A308(M)

== A194(M) ==
=== Motorway junctions ===
A194(M) motorway
Northbound exits	Junction	Southbound exits
Gateshead, Newcastle, Sunderland, Tyne Tunnel A184; South Shields A194	J3; Terminus	Start of motorway
Washington (N), Felling A195	J2	Washington A195
Washington A182	J1	Washington A182; Birtley (B1288); Gateshead, Newcastle (A1)
Start of motorway	A1(M) J65	The SOUTH, Durham A1(M)

== See also ==
- List of motorways in the United Kingdom
