= A690 road =

Road in north east England

A690

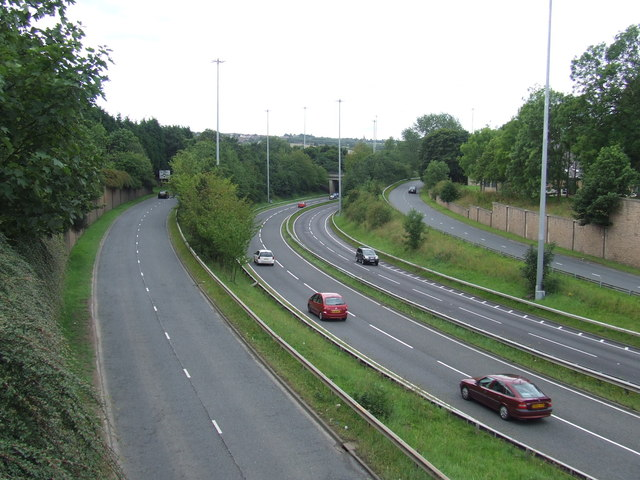
- A690 Houghton Cut

Route information
- Length: 22.2 mi (35.7 km)

Major junctions
- East end: Sunderland
- A1231; A183; A19; A1052; A182; A1(M); A181; A691; A1052; A167; A689
- West end: Crook

Location
- Country: United Kingdom
- Constituent country: England
- Primary destinations: Sunderland, Durham

Road network
- Roads in the United Kingdom; Motorways; A and B road zones
← A689	→ A691

The A690 is a road in North East England, running from Sunderland in the east through Durham to Crook.

== Route ==
=== Sunderland section ===
Throughout the Sunderland section it is known as either Durham Road or New Durham Road, and is one of the major routes in and out of the city. A single carriageway section runs from the city centre to a large roundabout at the Barnes. The road then climbs a steep hill toward High Barnes, alongside the Bede site of the Sunderland College before becoming dual carriageway. Beyond a set of traffic lights at the Prospect Hotel, the road remains dual carriageway, but the inside lane is a 'no car lane'. (In early 2009 the Prospect Hotel was demolished to make way for a new Lidl store.) The road then climbs another hill, becoming single carriageway, with the Farringdon estate to the east and the Thorney Close estate to the west. A down hill stretch leads into the East Herrington and then on toward the A19 fly-over. Just after the A19 intersection, the road once again becomes a dual carriageway with a speed limit of 50 miles per hour (80 km/h). Within the first mile after the A19, the road comes to a notoriously bad intersection - which is frequented by a speed camera van on the Eastbound carriageway just outside the Evans Halshaw. The road then runs through Houghton-le-Spring, via a locally famous transport feature named Houghton Cut. This huge cut through the hillside was reputedly built with the forced labour of Napoleonic prisoners of war. The road then runs out of the City of Sunderland boundary and on toward the A1.

=== Houghton Cut ===
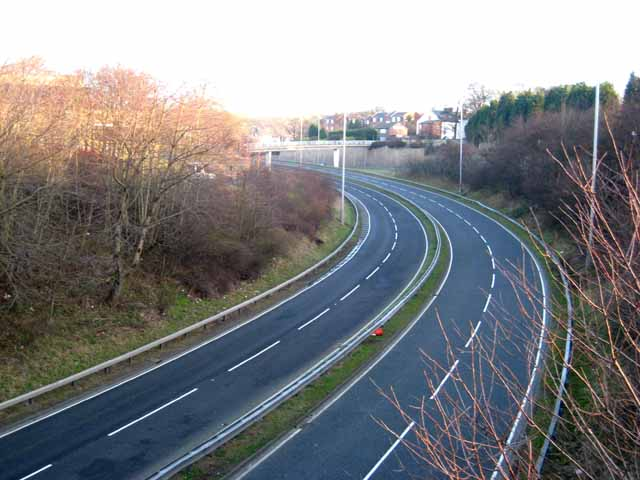
Houghton Cut

The Houghton Cut "carries the A690 over the steep and prominent Magnesian Limestone escarpment at Houghton". In 1815, French prisoners of war blasted this cut deeper than it already was, to improve the road to Sunderland's port. It was blasted again for the same reason in the 1930s, and "the Germans are said to have helped by bombing it". From 1968 to 1970 it was widened again.

=== Durham section ===
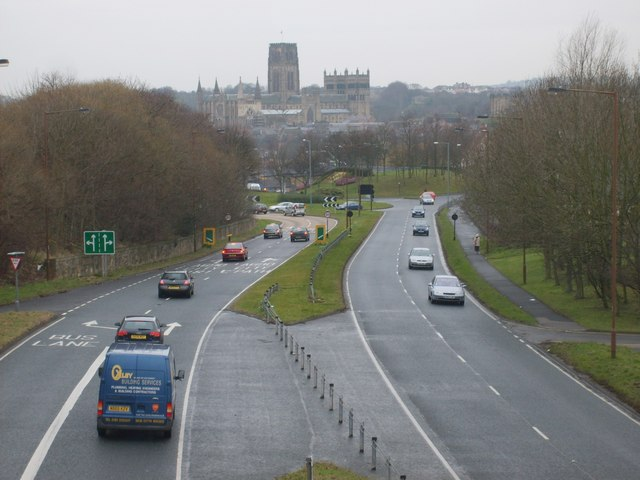
The A690 enters Durham

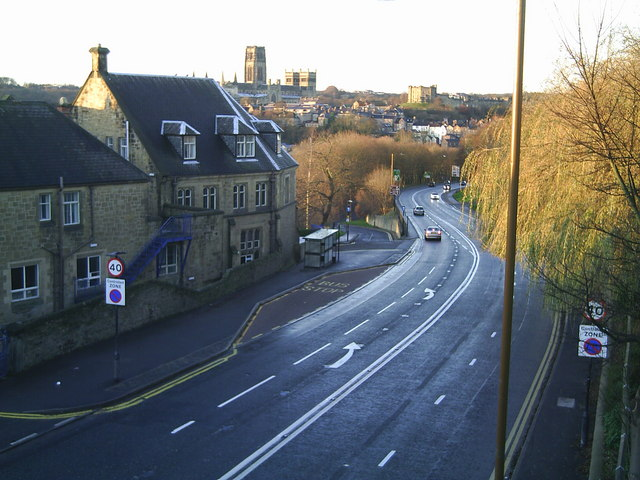
A690 in Durham

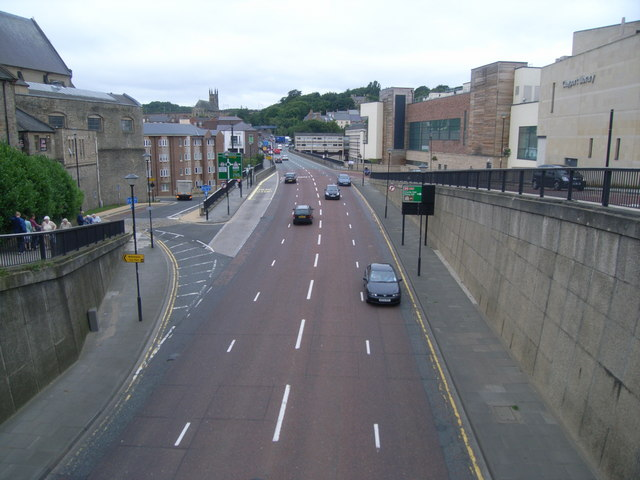
Looking down the A690 at Durham
