= Temple Memorial Park =

Park in South Shields

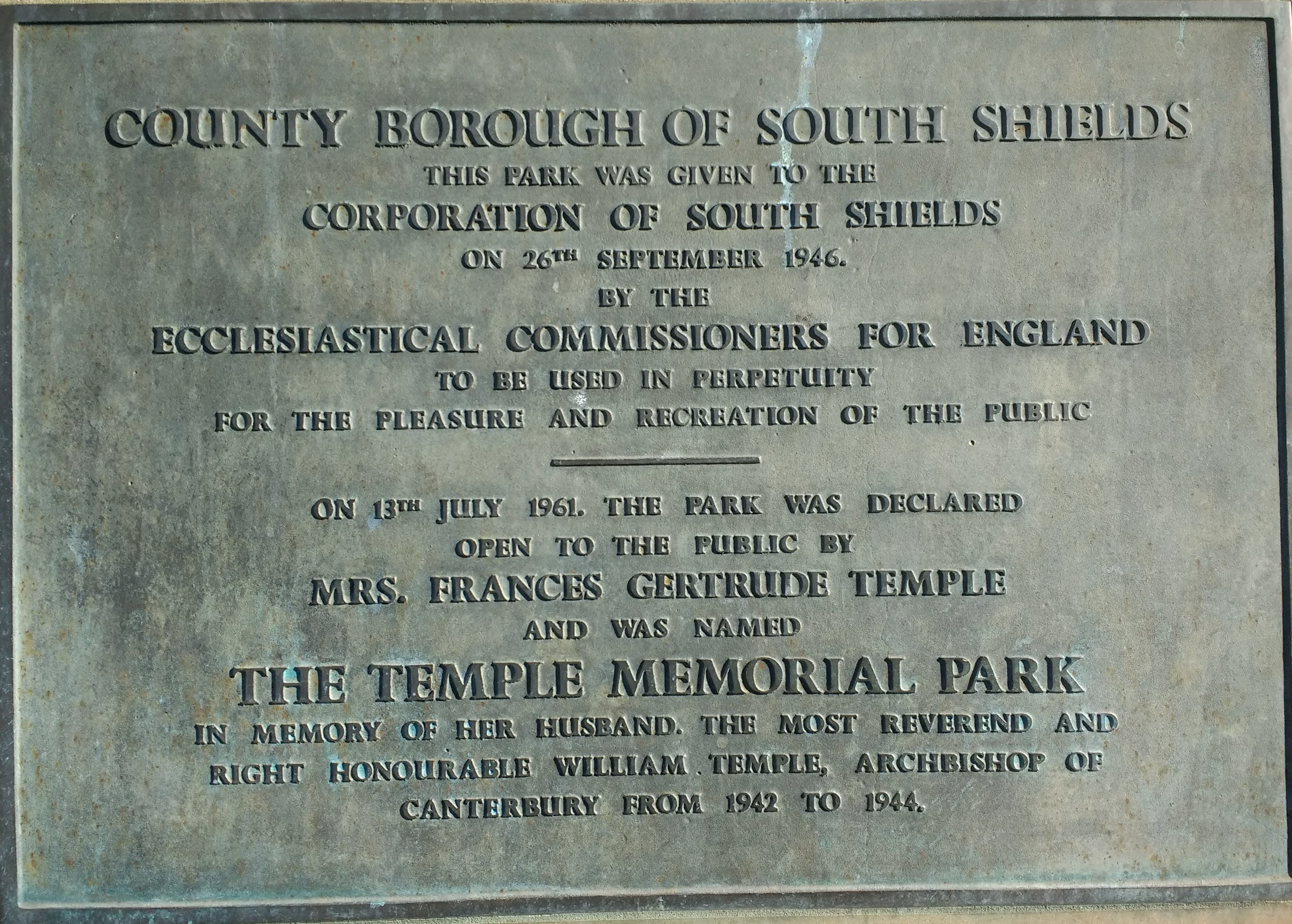
- Plaque commemorating 1961 opening of Temple Memorial Park.

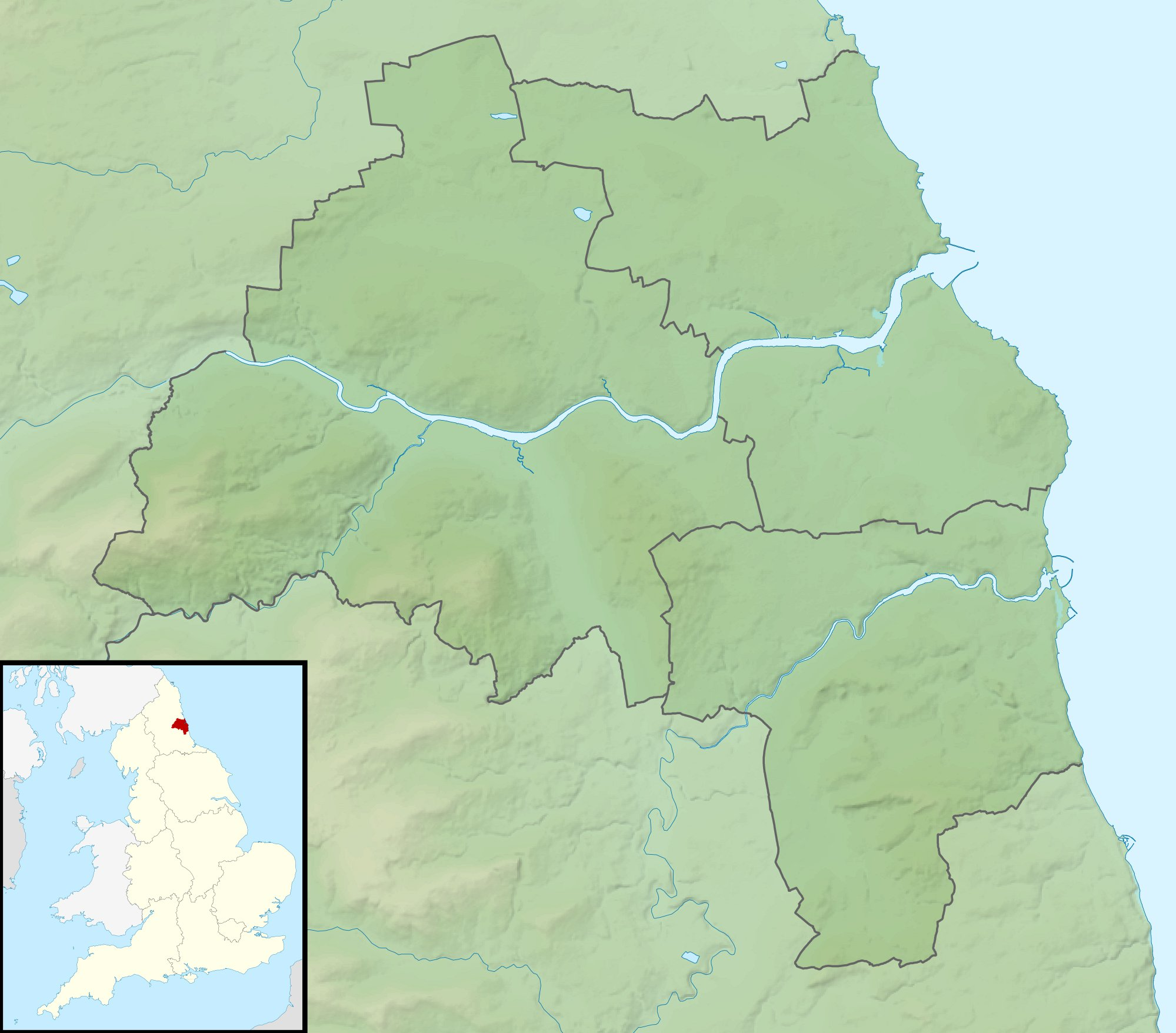
- Location within Tyne and Wear
- Location: South Shields
- Coordinates: 54°58′03″N 01°25′21″W
- Area: 175 acres (71 ha)
- Opened: 12 July 1961
- Operator: South Tyneside Council

Temple Memorial Park (known locally simply as Temple Park) is a park in South Shields, Tyne and Wear, England, given to the public by the Ecclesiastical Commissioners in 1946 and named after William Temple, the former archbishop of Canterbury.

== History ==
Temple Memorial Park was given to the people of South Shields by the Ecclesiastical Commissioners in 1946 to recognise their contribution to winning the war at sea in the Second World War. The park was named after William Temple, the former archbishop of Canterbury, and was opened by his widow Mrs Frances Temple on 12 July 1961. But for many years was used as a rubbish dump by the local authority

A cycle speedway track was built in 1967.

St Cuthbert's church on King George Road burned down in the early 1970s and the North Pastures Farm (located within Temple Park) was demolished in the late 1960s.

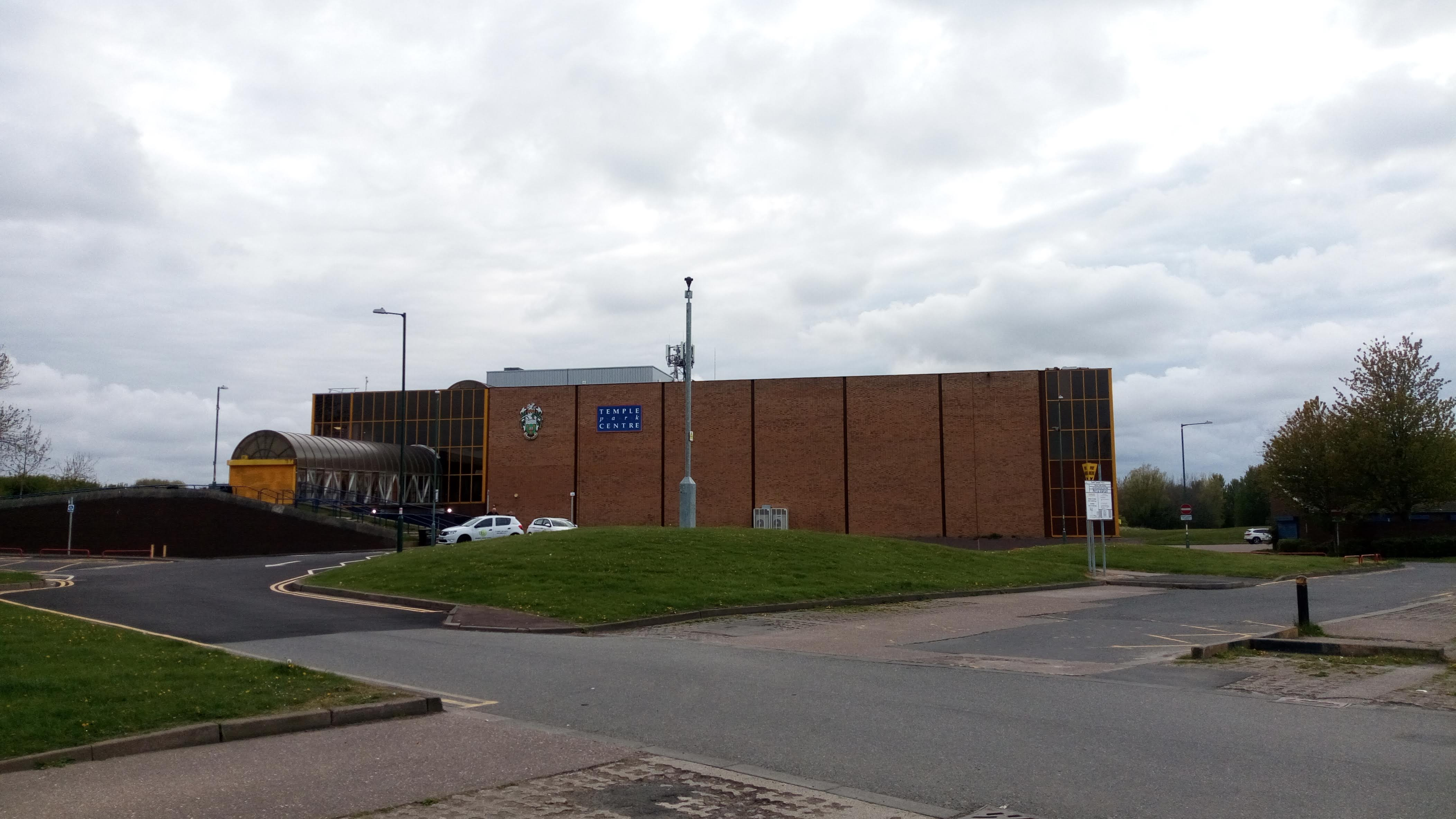
The centre has a gym and indoor sports facilities.

Constructed on the site of the former cycle speedway track, the Temple Park Centre was opened in 1977, offering facilities including a swimming pool, closed in October 2013 and demolished in 2018.

Temple Park Junior school closed on 31 August 2011 and, after attacks by vandals, demolished in 2018.

== Later history ==
In March 2019, a local campaign sought to have the park recognised as a war memorial.

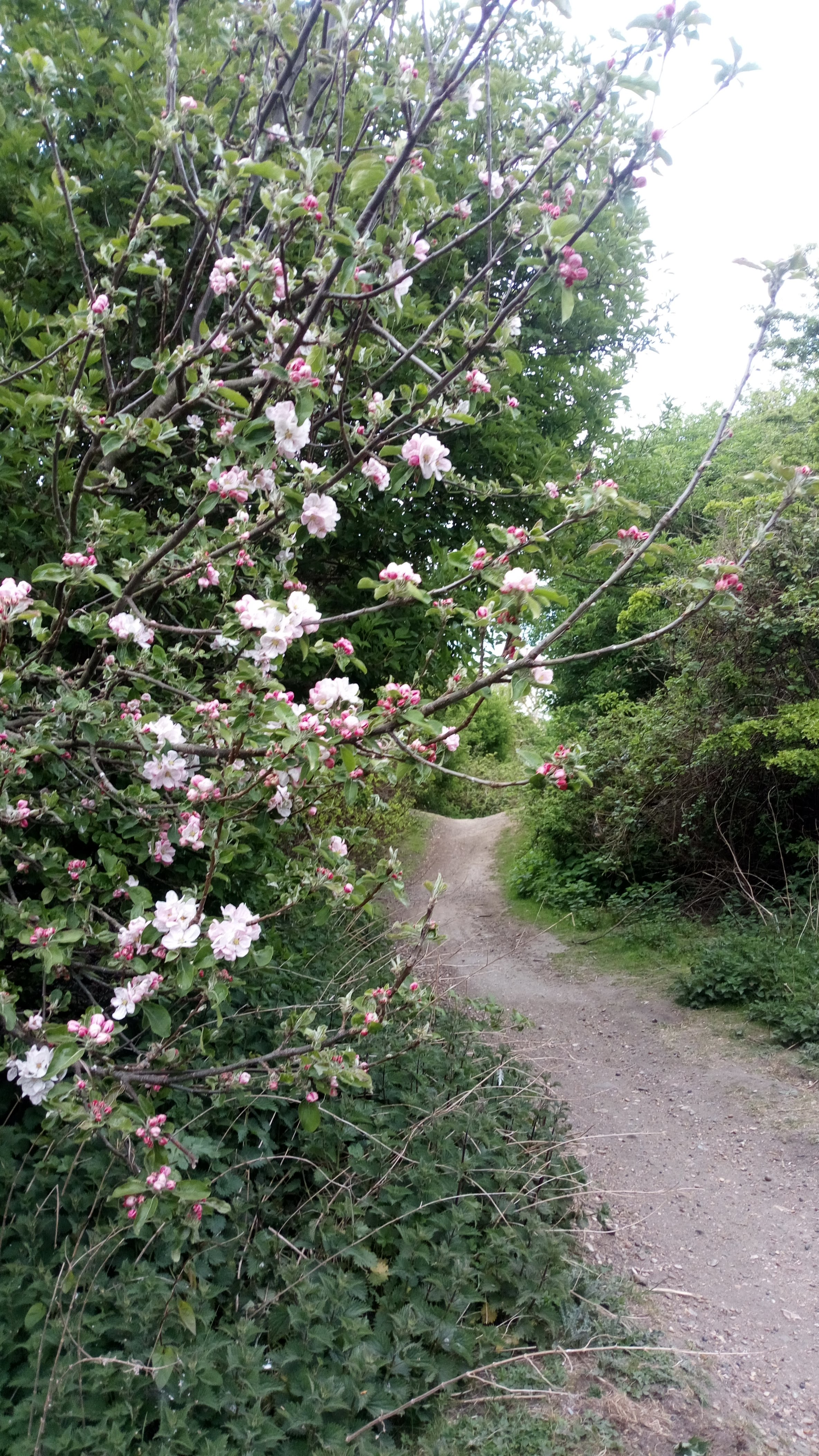
A steep hill and circular route for mountain bikes was created within the park.

In November 2019, 840 trees were planted.

== Facilities ==
Temple Park has a route, often called the BMX track, created specifically for mountain bikes, paths and green spaces for walkers and a skate park, playground, football court and car park. Since May 2016, the park has been used for five kilometre running events.

The Temple Park Centre's indoor facilities include a gym, netball courts and rooms for fitness classes.
