= Don Bridge =

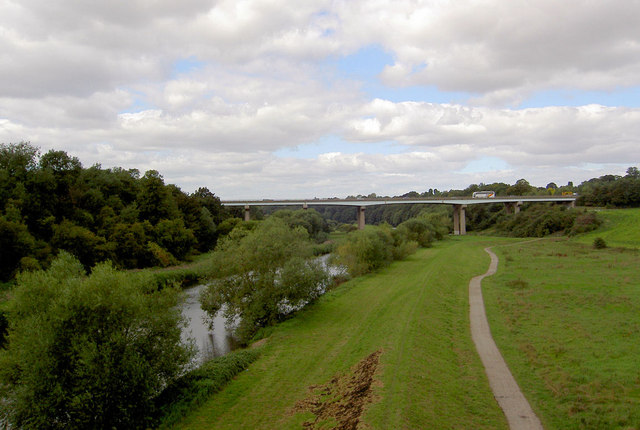
- View, looking west, in August 2007
- Coordinates: 53.51°N 1.18°W
- OS grid reference: SE547016
- Carries: A1(M)
- Crosses: River Don
- Locale: Sprotbrough, South Yorkshire
- Maintained by: National Highways

Characteristics
- Design: Girder bridge
- Material: Reinforced concrete, Steel
- Total length: 760 ft (230 m)
- Height: 70 ft (21 m)
- Longest span: 180 ft (55 m)
- No. of spans: 7
- No. of lanes: 2 each direction

History
- Designer: West Riding County Council
- Construction start: June 1959
- Opened: 31 July 1961

Statistics
- Daily traffic: ▼85,747 (2018); Count point

Location
- Interactive map of Don Bridge

Location in South Yorkshire
Location in Doncaster Borough
Location in UK motorway network

The Don Bridge is a motorway viaduct in South Yorkshire, England.

== History ==
The line of the fifteen-mile Doncaster By-Pass Motorway was fixed in the spring of 1957.

=== Design ===
Each carriageway is carried on a separate structure. Each carriageway is supported by five riveted steel girders. There are 2,225 tons of structural steelwork.

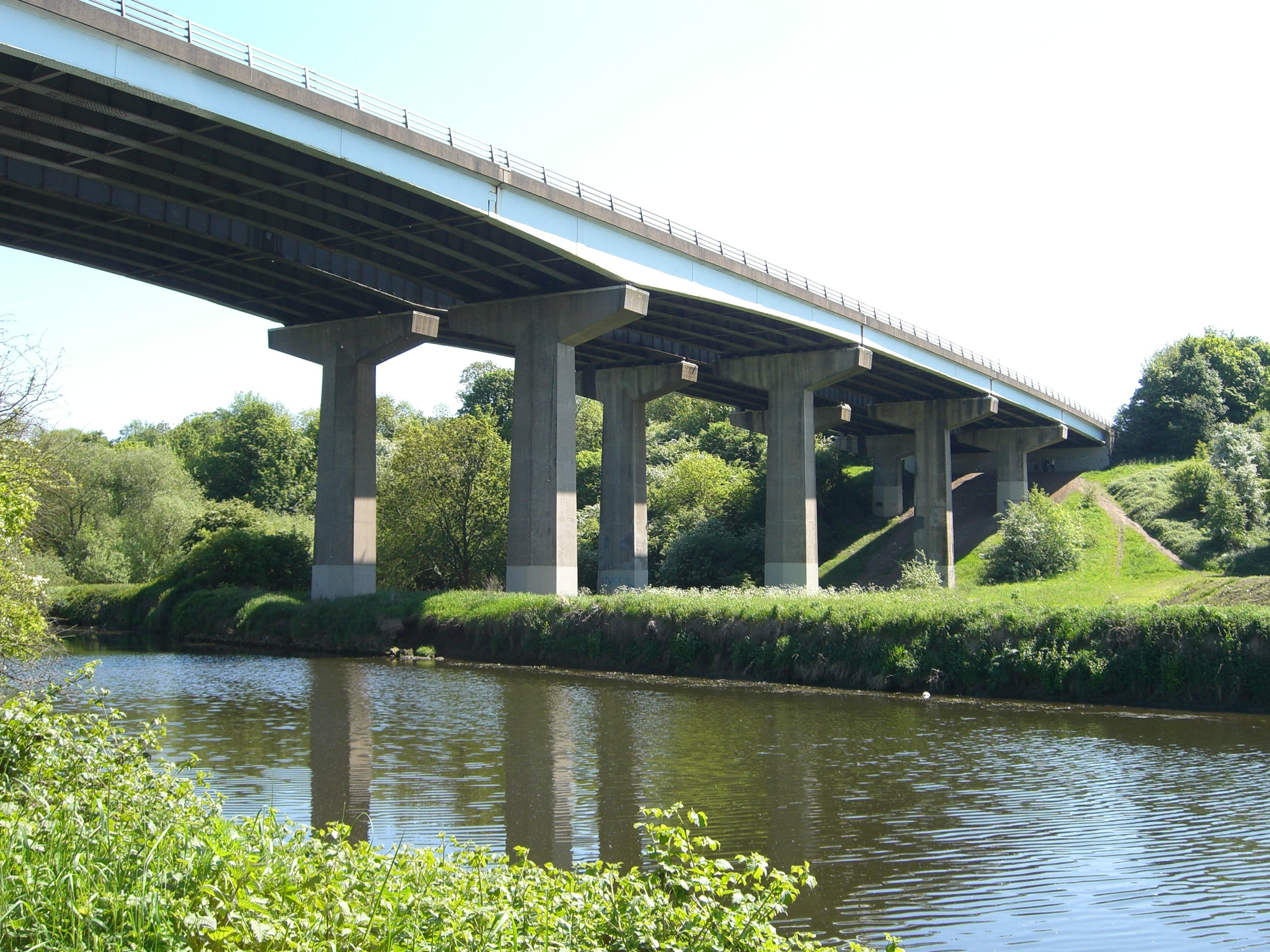
View in May 2010

=== Construction ===
Construction of the Doncaster bypass started on 22 June 1959. There were 28 bridges in the contract for the Doncaster bypass, including five railway bridges.

The fabrication of the steelwork for the bridge took place at the West Bromwich Works. The steel superstructure for the bridge was launched from one end of the bridge on an embankment. The steel fabrication was sprayed with zinc. The concrete and steel design is known as composite construction.

The concrete beams were made by Ferro Concrete and Stone Co. (North Notts) Ltd of Retford.

The bypass was built by a consortium including Holland, Hannen & Cubitts, on a £6 million contract.

== Structure ==
The south side of the bridge is in Warmsworth, and the north side is in Sprotbrough and Cusworth. The bridge crosses the Trans Pennine Trail (National Cycle Route 62), which follows the river. It is situated around one mile north of junction 36.
