= A183 road (England) =

Road in Tyne & Wear

A183

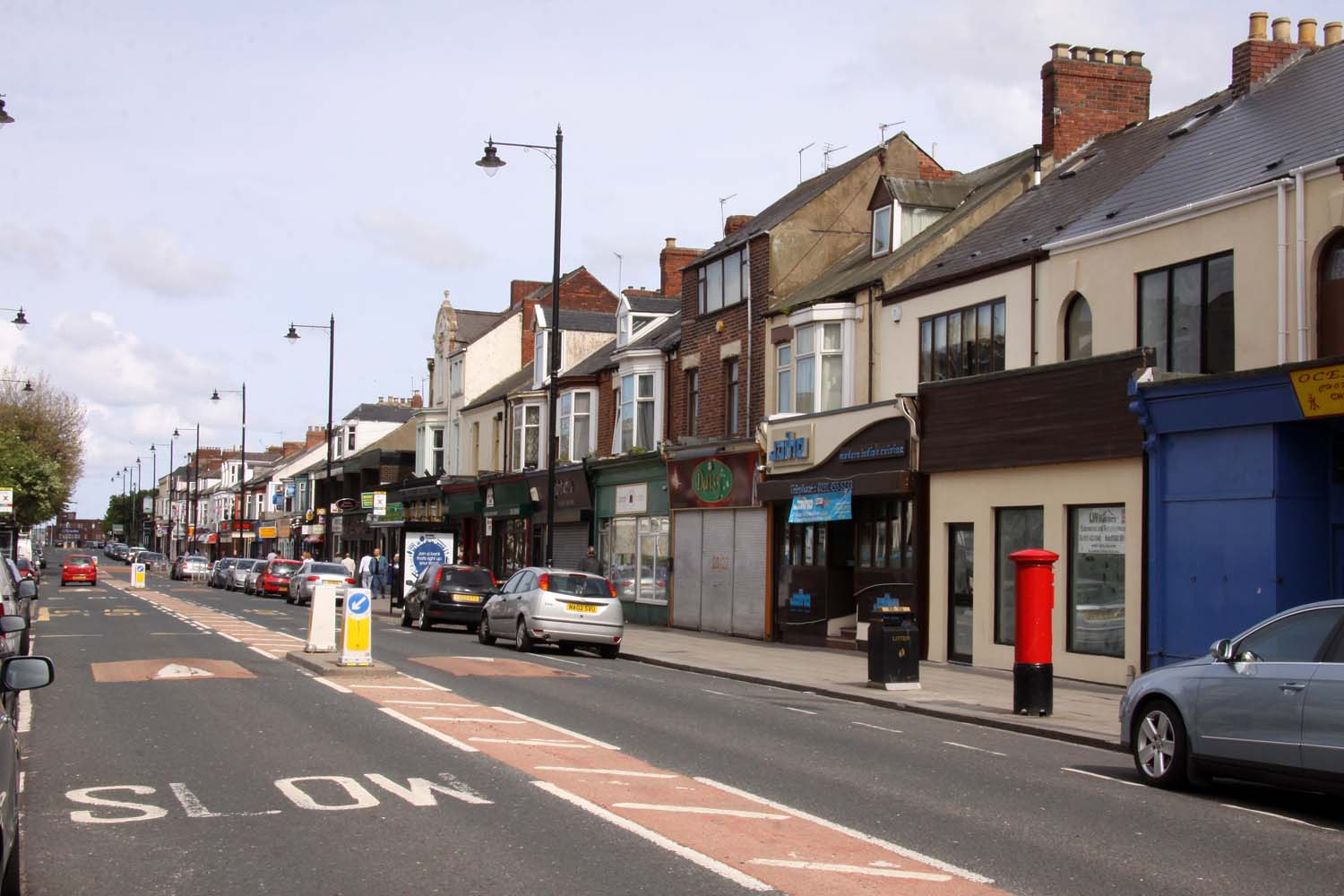
- Ocean Road (A183) in South Shields

Route information
- Length: 18.2 mi (29.3 km)

Major junctions
- North end: A1018 / A194, near South Shields Town Hall

- A1300; A1231; A690; A19; A182; A1052

- South end: A1(M) / A167 / A693 near Chester-le-Street

Location
- Country: United Kingdom

Road network
- Roads in the United Kingdom; Motorways; A and B road zones
← A182	→ A184

The A183 road runs from South Shields in Tyne and Wear, through Sunderland and ends at Chester-le-Street in County Durham. It is a major route in South Tyneside, Sunderland and Chester-le-Street serving many areas and landmarks along its route.

== Route ==
=== Borough of South Tyneside ===
==== South Shields ====
===== Beach Road =====
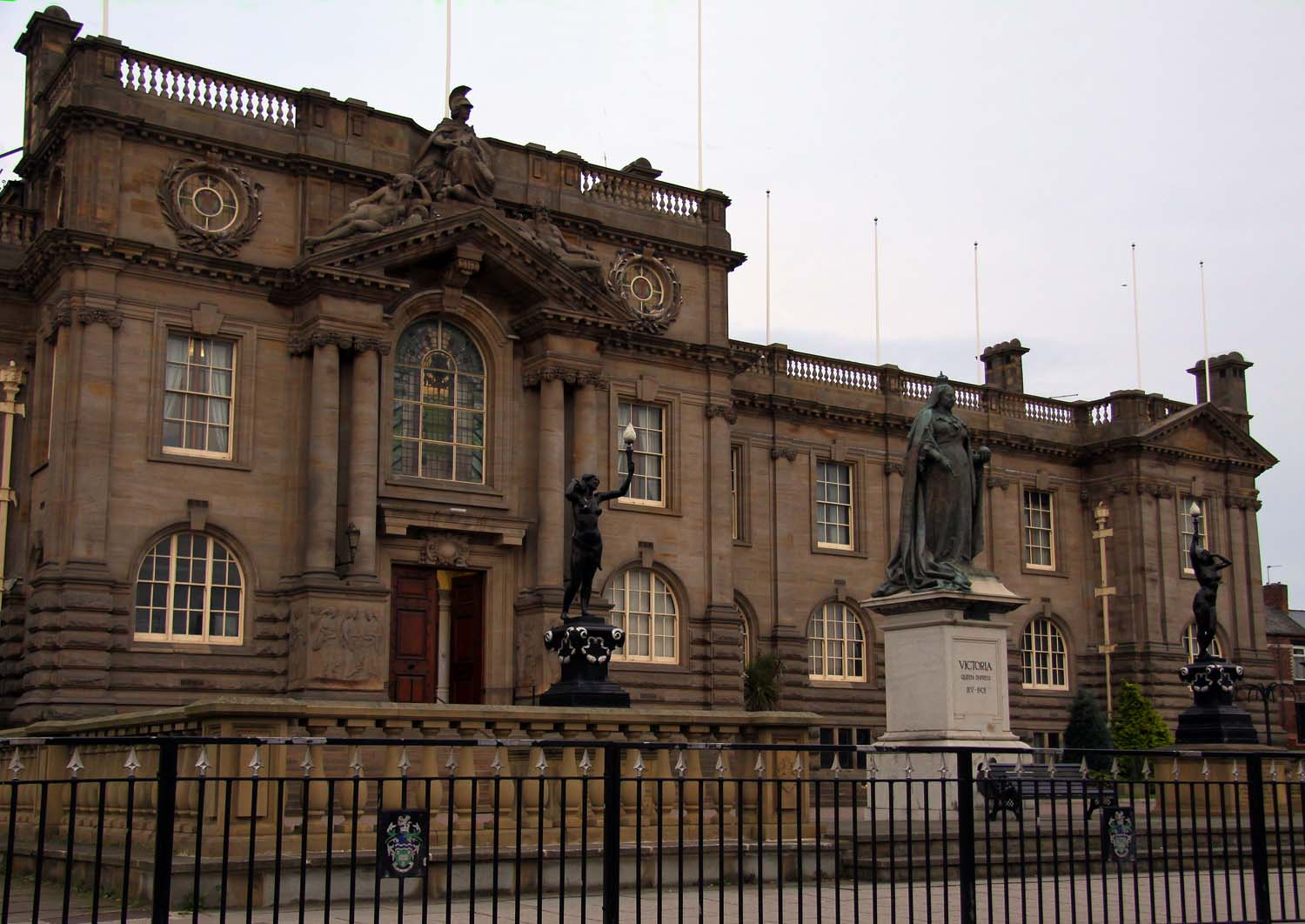
The A183 starts here, at South Shields town hall

The road begins in the centre of South Shields, at a junction with the A194 and A1018, near the Town Hall, as Beach Road. It follows the side of the town hall for 0.223 kilometres (0.139 mi), before turning left at a roundabout, becoming Anderson Street

===== Anderson Street =====
It follows Anderson Street for around 0.389 kilometres (0.242 mi), before turning right at a Morrisons. During that period, it meets Winchester Street after 0.151 kilometres (0.094 mi) at a roundabout, and a ramp to the Woodbine Estate after approximately 0.222 kilometres (0.138 mi)

===== Ocean Road =====
Here it becomes Ocean Road, famous locally for its Indian restaurants.

===== Sea Road =====
The A183 then becomes Sea Road as it passes between North Marine Park and South Marine Park, before meeting the B1344 at a roundabout with the Sea Hotel, which has recently gone into administration after the Coronavirus pandemic. The road then continues along the seafront area of the town as, passing Littlehaven Beach, the fairground, the Amphitheatre, Bents Park and local pubs. The road then turns at Colman's Seafood Temple, famous locally for its Fish & Chips, and passes Gypsies Green Stadium.

===== Coast Road =====
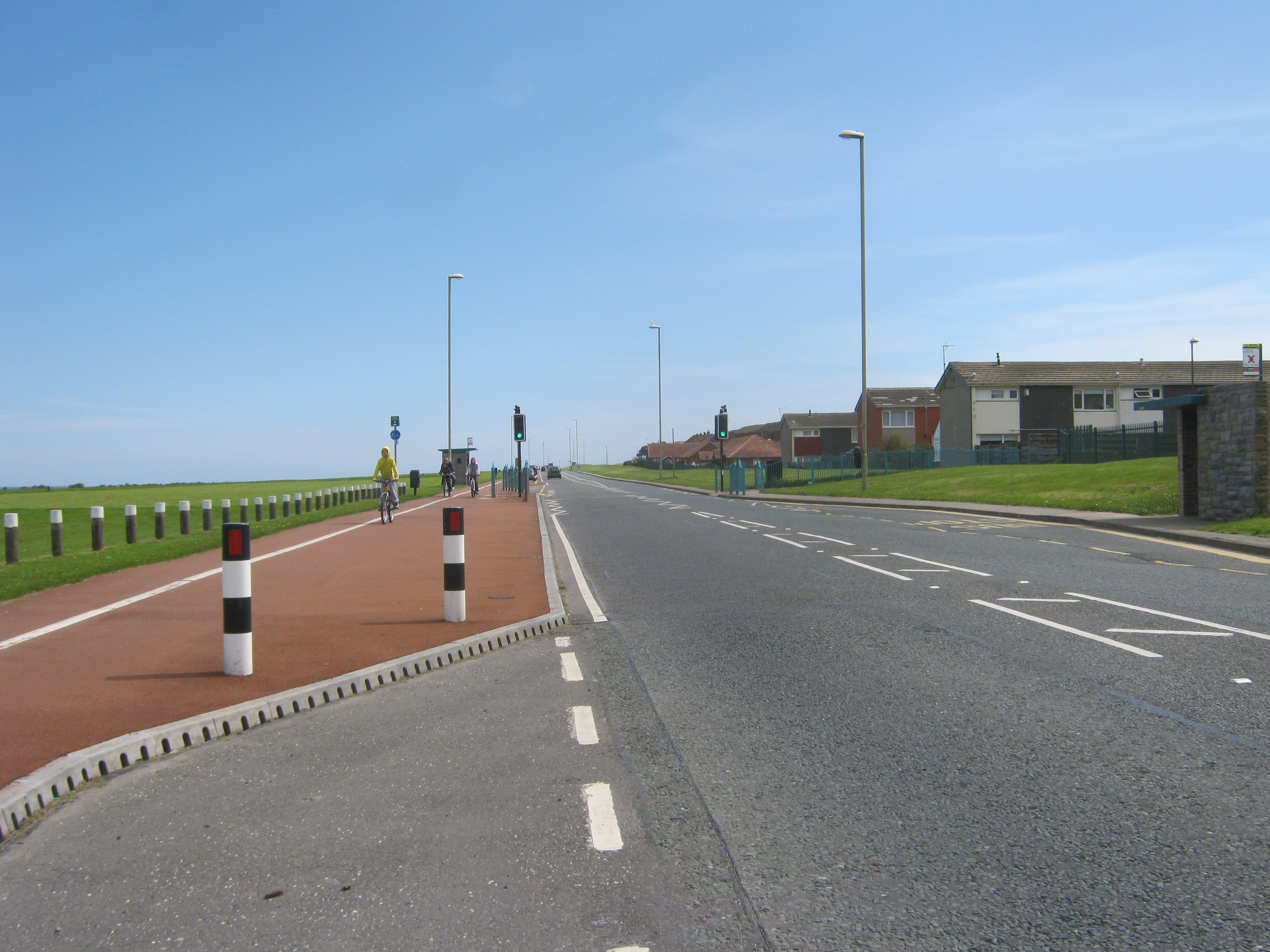
Coast Road (A183) in South Shields

At the New Crown Hotel it becomes the Coast Road once past the junction for the Waters Edge public house, the road continues to Marsden without any turn junctions, passing The Leas on the coastal side, the finishing point for the Great North Run. The A183 then meets the A1300 at its junction on Redwell Lane and continues as the Coast Road. Next the road passes the famous Marsden Rock and Marsden Grotto on Marsden Beach. The A183 then continues at the Coast Road until it reaches Souter Lighthouse. There have been plans made by South Tyneside Council to realign a section of the road between the A1300 Redwell Lane and the Souter Lighthouse.

==== Marsden ====
The road now becomes Mill Lane as it passes through Whitburn Colliery.

==== Whitburn ====
The road changes its name to East Street as it passes through Whitburn Village itself, where the road meets the B1299, taking traffic towards the village of Cleadon. After passing Cornthwaite Park, the A183 becomes Whitburn Bents Road and enters the borough of Sunderland.

=== Borough of Sunderland ===
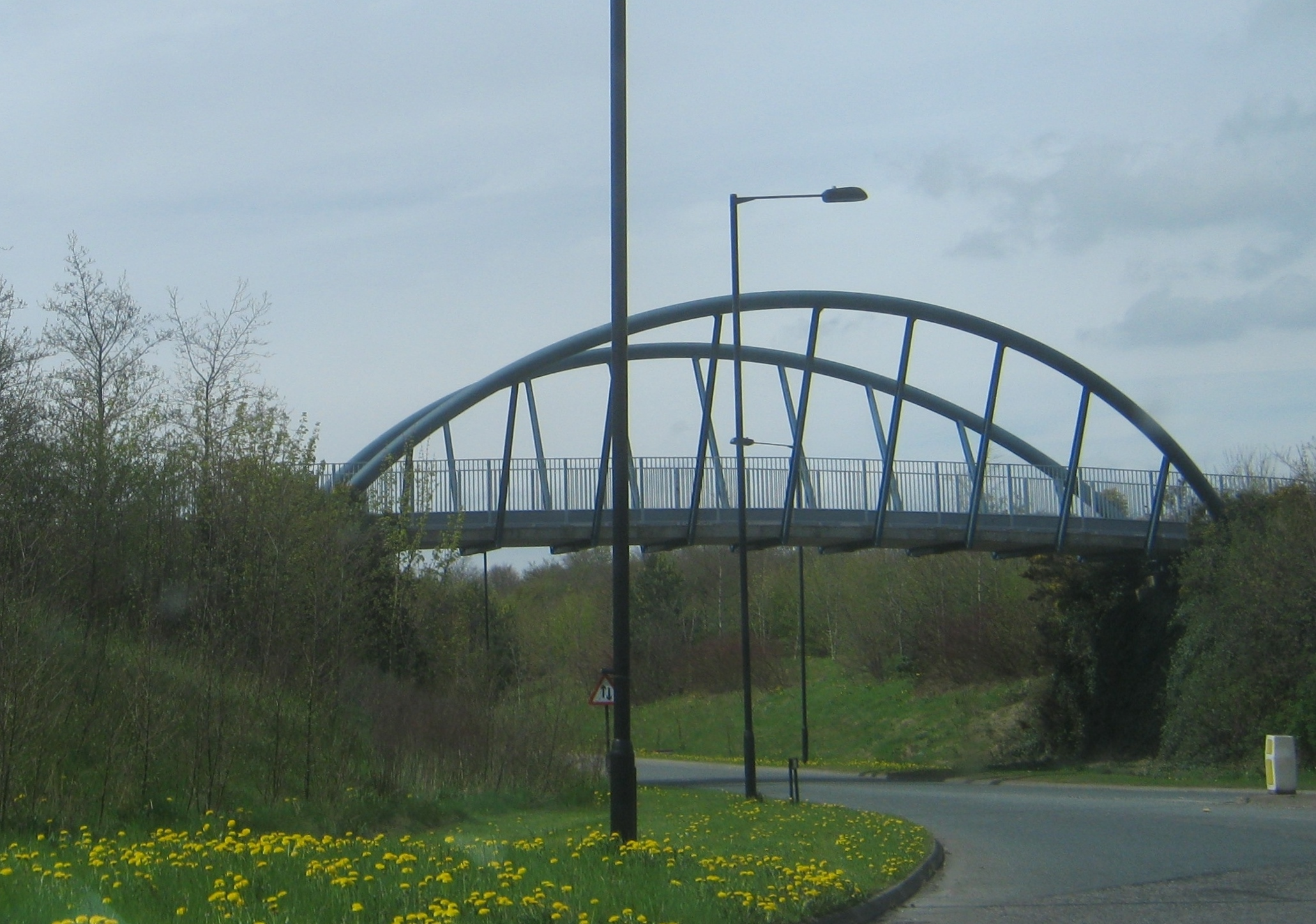
Footbridge over A183 Basswood Road in Shiney Row

==== Seaburn ====
Once through Whitburn, the road continues as Whitburn Bents Road, before changing its name to Whitburn Road, as we reach a roundabout with Lowry Road - the entrance to a Morrisons - here we enter Seaburn, which was the home of the annual Sunderland International Airshow which attracted 1.2 million visitors, before Sunderland Council stopped doing it in 2019, due to the council's efforts to be carbon neutral. Through Seaburn, the road passes lots of restaurants and bars, and also the B1291, before passing another roundabout, which mean we enter Roker.

==== Roker ====
After about 0.8 miles (1.3 km), it turns right onto Harbour View.

==== Monkwearmouth ====
It winds alongside the River Wear, before becoming Dame Dorothy Street, where it passes the National Glass Centre, the St. Peter's campus of the University of Sunderland, and the UNESCO World Heritage Site St. Peter's Church, built in 674AD (one of the oldest in England), before meeting the A1018.

==== Sunderland city centre ====
===== Wearmouth Bridge =====
The two roads run concurrent across the Wearmouth Bridge to cross the River Wear into the city centre, before splitting- the A1018 turning left to go around the eastern edge of the city, with the A183 turning right; looping around the north-western edge of the city centre as St. Mary's Way and Livingstone Road.

===== St. Michael's Way =====
Afterwards, we follow St. Michael's Way with the A1231 for around 275 yards (251 m), where the A183 turns right onto Chester Road.

==== Bishopwearmouth ====
As Chester Road it runs past the city campus of the University, and through a commercial section before reaching the Sunderland Royal Hospital.

==== Barnes ====
It runs alongside Bishopwearmouth Cemetery towards the Grindon estate, where it crosses the B1405.

==== Grindon, Pennywell and Hastings Hill ====
It is here that it becomes a dual carriageway - running past the Pennywell and Hastings Hill estates, past the Sunderland Echo office, to reach the A19.

==== Herrington and Penshaw ====
Past the A19 the road runs past the Herrington Country Park and the Penshaw Monument, through Penshaw, before reaching a large roundabout at Shiney Row with the A182.

==== Shiney Row ====
Originally, the road carried on through Shiney Row - but due to traffic-calming measures and the opening of a new link road past the new Biddick Woods Estate (which lies to the west of Shiney Row), the B1519 uses the old A183. Instead, A183 becomes Washington Highway, and shares the A182 for approx 0.4 miles (0.64 km), before coming onto its own again at Biddick Woods, changing its name to Basswood Road. It then links onto its original route just short of the county boundary, once again becoming Chester Road.

=== Borough of County Durham ===
The road becomes single carriageway once more, and passes out of Sunderland through Bournmoor, before passing the northern end of the A1052 at another roundabout. It runs downhill alongside the River Wear, close to Lumley Castle - this stretch is called New Bridge Bank, and the road crosses over the New Bridge, one of the earliest crossings over the River Wear. The road ends at the A1(M) junction 67, with the A693 and A167.
