= Sunderland Docks =

Area of Sunderland, England

Coordinates: 54.908°N 1.360°W

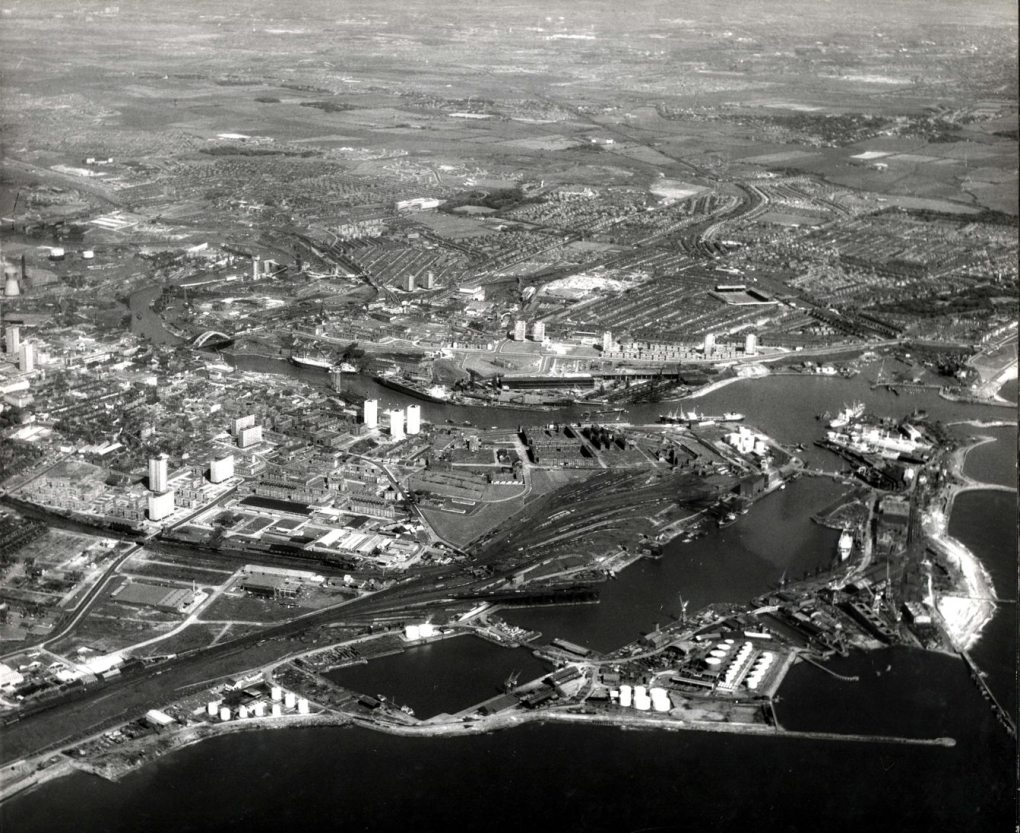
Sunderland Docks in 1969.

Sunderland Docks is an area of Sunderland, Tyne and Wear, England. Home to the Port of Sunderland, the docks have access to the North Sea. Sunderland City Council took over the port in 1972 and since then deindustrialisation has caused the port to decline.

== History ==
Sunderland Dock Act 1846
- Act of Parliament
- Parliament of the United Kingdom
- Long title: An Act for constructing a Wet Dock and other Works on the South Side of the River Wear at Sunderland-near-the-Sea in the County Palatine of Durham.
- Citation: 9 & 10 Vict. c. xiii

Dates
- Royal assent: 14 May 1846

Other legislation
- Repealed by: Sunderland Dock Act 1855

Status: Repealed

The Sunderland Dock Company was formed by the Sunderland Dock Act 1846 (9 & 10 Vict. c. xiii) and was chaired by Sunderland's Member of Parliament George Hudson MP.

On 27 July 2018, a man was killed in an explosion at the docks. A spokesman for Northumbria Police said that "The police were made aware that a man had died in a suspected industrial accident on Prospect Row, at Sunderland Docks. The man was named as dock worker Brendan Eccles, a 61-year-old grandfather from Billingham. In 2019, the incident was investigated and examined by Sunderland City Council who produced a review into health and safety issues.

In 2020, a Greenpeace ship staged a protest off the coast of the docks.

== Politics ==
Sunderland Docks is part of the Sunderland Central parliamentary constituency.

== Popular culture ==
In 2021, scenes for the TV series Vera was filmed at the port.
