= Sunderland Central =

UK Parliament constituency (since 2010)

Coordinates: 54.904°N 1.381°W

- Borough constituency for the House of Commons
- Interactive map of boundaries since 2010
- Location within North East England
- County: Tyne and Wear
- Electorate: 72,688 (March 2020)

Current constituency
- Created: 2010
- Member of Parliament: Lewis Atkinson (Labour Party)
- Seats: One
- Created from: Sunderland North, Sunderland South

Sunderland Central is a constituency in the House of Commons of the UK Parliament. It is represented by the Labour Party MP Lewis Atkinson, who has held the seat since 2024.

== Constituency profile ==
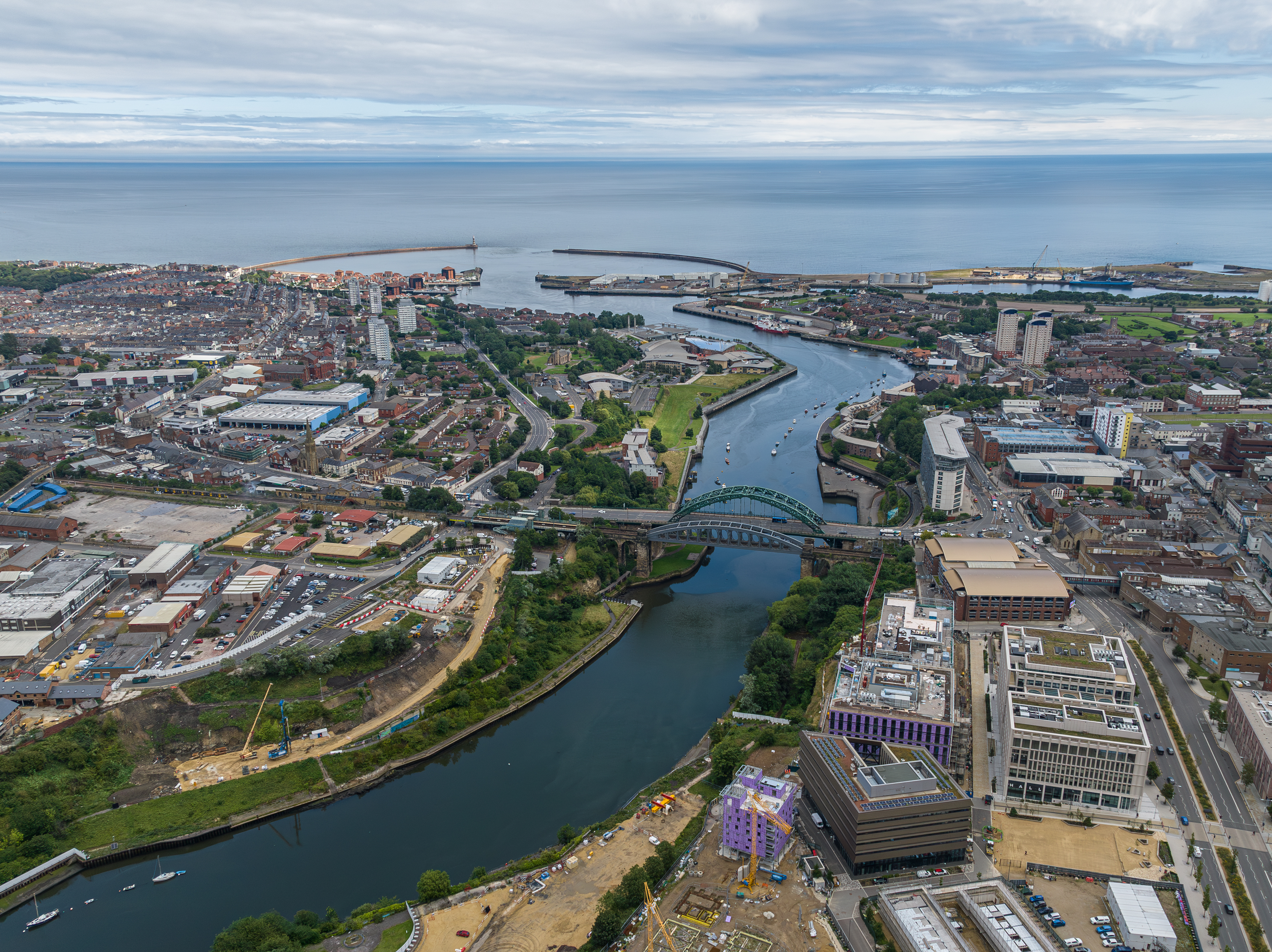
Sunderland

Sunderland Central is a constituency in Tyne and Wear in North East England. It covers most of Sunderland, including the city centre and the neighbourhoods of Monkwearmouth, Roker, Fulwell, Seaburn, Southwick, Pallion, Bishopwearmouth, Barnes, Millfield, Ashbrooke, Hendon, Grangetown and Ryhope.

Sunderland is an industrial port city. It is best known for its shipbuilding industry; in the mid-19th century, a third of the UK's ships were built here. Other industries included coal mining and glassmaking. These industries largely disappeared in the late 20th century, leaving the city with high rates of unemployment. Much of Sunderland remains highly-deprived today with most residents living in dense flats or terraces, although there are some wealthier suburbs like Ashbrooke and Fulwell. House prices across the constituency are generally lower than the rest of North East England, and the average price is less than half the UK average.

Residents of Sunderland Central have a similar age profile to the rest of the country. They have low rates of income and average levels of homeownership. The child poverty rate is high. Residents generally have low levels of education and a high proportion work in the health, education and public sectors. The percentage claiming unemployment benefits is in line with the overall UK rate. White people made up 90% of the population at the 2021 census.

At the local city council, most of this constituency is represented by Reform UK with some Liberal Democrats elected in Pallion and Fulwell and Labour Party councillors elected in Barnes. An estimated 58% of voters in Sunderland Central supported leaving the European Union in the 2016 referendum, higher than the UK-wide figure of 52%.

== Boundaries ==
Sunderland Central was created for the 2010 general election when the Boundary Commission reduced the number of seats in Tyne and Wear from 13 to 12, with the constituencies in the City of Sunderland, in particular, being reorganised. It comprised the following wards of the City of Sunderland:

- Barnes, Fulwell, Hendon, Millfield, Pallion, Ryhope, St Michael's, St Peter's and Southwick.

The constituency was formed primarily from the abolished Sunderland North seat, together with parts of the abolished constituencies of Sunderland South (Hendon and St Michael's wards) and Houghton and Washington East (Ryhope ward). The reorganisation also created the Houghton and Sunderland South and Washington and Sunderland West constituencies.

The 2023 review of Westminster constituencies left the boundaries unchanged.

Following a local government boundary review, which came into effect in May 2026, the seat now comprises the following wards or part wards of the City of Sunderland:

- Barnes & Thornhill; Deptford & Hendon; Fulwell; Grangetown; Grindon & Thornley Close (small part); Pallion & Ford; Pennywell & South Hylton (small part); Roker; Ryhope (most); Southwick; Tunstall & Humbledon (most); and a very small part of Redhouse.

== Political history ==
Sunderland Central is a slightly more marginal seat than its predecessors with a swing of 12.8% from Labour to the Conservatives required for the latter party to win the seat in 2010. This is because it brings together virtually all of the areas of historical Conservative strength, such as Fulwell and St Michaels, into one seat.

=== Local politics of wards in the seat ===
At the 2008 city council elections, held in thirds, the Conservatives carried five of Sunderland Central's nine wards, with Labour winning three and the Liberal Democrats one. However, at the next city council elections held on the same day as the 2010 general election, the Conservatives carried only two of Sunderland Central's nine wards, with Labour winning seven and the Liberal Democrats none.

== Members of Parliament ==
Election	Member	Party
2010	Julie Elliott	Labour
2024	Lewis Atkinson	Labour

== Elections ==
=== Elections in the 2020s ===
General election 2024: Sunderland Central
Party	Candidate	Votes	%	±%
Labour	Lewis Atkinson	16,852	42.2	±0.0
Reform	Chris Eynon	10,779	27.0	+15.4
Conservative	Gregory Peacock	5,731	14.3	−21.1
Liberal Democrats	Niall Hodson	3,602	9.0	+2.0
Green	Rachel Featherstone	2,993	7.5	+4.7
Majority		6,073	15.2	+8.4
Turnout		39,957	52.5	−7.3
Registered electors		76,145		
Labour hold		Swing	−7.7	

=== Elections in the 2010s ===
General election 2019: Sunderland Central
Party	Candidate	Votes	%	±%
Labour	Julie Elliott	18,336	42.2	−13.3
Conservative	Tom D'Silva	15,372	35.4	+2.1
Brexit Party	Viral Parikh	5,047	11.6	New
Liberal Democrats	Niall Hodson	3,025	7.0	+3.1
Green	Rachel Featherstone	1,212	2.8	+1.3
Independent	Dale McKenzie	484	1.1	New
Majority		2,964	6.8	−15.4
Turnout		43,476	59.8	−2.2
Labour hold		Swing	−7.7	

General election 2017: Sunderland Central
Party	Candidate	Votes	%	±%
Labour	Julie Elliott	25,056	55.5	+5.3
Conservative	Robert Oliver	15,059	33.3	+9.9
UKIP	Gary Leighton	2,209	4.8	−14.3
Liberal Democrats	Niall Hodson	1,777	3.9	+1.3
Green	Rachel Featherstone	705	1.5	−2.6
Independent	Sean Cockburn	305	0.6	New
Majority		9,997	22.2	−4.6
Turnout		45,111	62.0	+5.0
Labour hold		Swing	−2.3	

General election 2015: Sunderland Central
Party	Candidate	Votes	%	±%
Labour	Julie Elliott	20,959	50.2	+4.3
Conservative	Jeff Townsend	9,780	23.4	−6.7
UKIP	Bryan Foster	7,997	19.1	+16.5
Green	Rachel Featherstone	1,706	4.1	New
Liberal Democrats	Adrian Page	1,105	2.6	−14.3
Independent	Joseph Young	215	0.5	New
Majority		11,179	26.8	+11.0
Turnout		41,762	57.0	±0.0
Labour hold		Swing	+5.5	

General election 2010: Sunderland Central
Party	Candidate	Votes	%	±%
Labour	Julie Elliott	19,495	45.9	
Conservative	Lee Martin	12,770	30.1	
Liberal Democrats	Paul Dixon	7,191	16.9	
BNP	John McCaffrey	1,913	4.5	
UKIP	Pauline Fentonby-Warren	1,094	2.6	
Majority		6,725	15.8	
Turnout		42,463	57.0	
Labour win (new seat)				

== See also ==
- City of Sunderland
- List of parliamentary constituencies in Tyne and Wear
- History of parliamentary constituencies and boundaries in Tyne and Wear
- Houghton and Sunderland South
- Washington and Sunderland West
