= Hendon, Sunderland =

Area of Sunderland, England

Coordinates: 54.9002°N 1.36807°W

Hendon
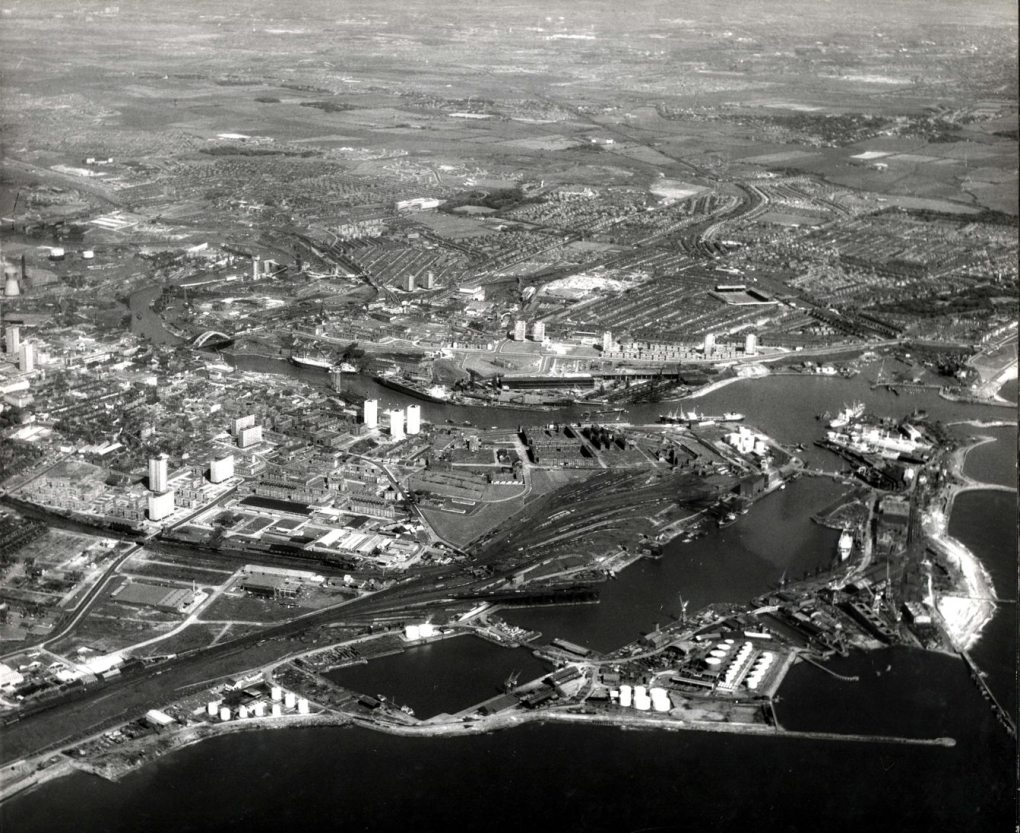
- Hendon docks, 1969

- Location within Tyne and Wear
- Population: 12,597 (2011.Ward)
- Metropolitan borough: City of Sunderland
- Metropolitan county: Tyne and Wear
- Region: North East
- Country: England
- Sovereign state: United Kingdom
- Post town: SUNDERLAND
- Postcode district: SR1, SR2
- Dialling code: 0191
- Police: Northumbria
- Fire: Tyne and Wear
- Ambulance: North East
- UK Parliament: Sunderland Central

Hendon is an eastern area of Sunderland in Tyne and Wear, North East England, the location of much heavy industry and Victorian terraces and three high-rise residential tower blocks. The area is commonly referred to as the East End of Sunderland. Hendon is west of Sunderland Docks.

The old east end of Sunderland was home to Sunderland Barracks until the 1930s. They were located on the south side near the south docks, near present-day Warren Court (formerly known as Warren Street). The first aluminium bascule bridge in the world, which opened in 1948, spanned the junction of Hendon and Hudson Docks. It suffered from bimetallic corrosion and was demolished in 1977.

The Victoria Hall Disaster occurred in the area on 16 June 1883 when 183 children died during a crush in a theatre, while running down the stairs in search of free toys. It remains the worst stampede disaster in British history.

The area was home to Sunderland AFC's first ground, The Blue House Field. The club was founded at the nearby Hendon Board School in 1879 by James Allen. Partly on its site now is the Raich Carter Sports Centre, named after an England international footballer who was born in the area.

Hendon contains the primary schools of Hudson Road and Valley Road. It is home to many shops along Villette Road such as Gregg's. Some main roads in Hendon are Villette Road, Commercial Road, Hendon Road, Gray Road, Mowbray Road and Hendon Valley Road. The "long streets" in Hendon (Cairo Street, Hastings Street, Canon Cockin Street, St Leonard's Street, Percy Terrace and Hunter Terrace) are very long, consisting of rows of Terraced Houses and even stretching into a new area: Grangetown.

== Shipbuilding ==
Thomas Menvill paid Bishop Hatfield an annual rent of 2s to build ships at Hendon, Sunderland (according to a 1697 copy of a document dated 1346) marking the start of shipbuilding in Sunderland. In 1943, the Admiralty decided to establish a fitting out facility at Hendon Dock. It opened in 1944 and in total 13 ships were fitted out there and 20 other naval craft used the facility for repairs before the end of the War

== Sources ==
- Paul Days; John Hudson; John Hudson; Bernard Callaghan (1 December 1999). Sunderland AFC: The Official History 1879–2000. Business Education Publishers Ltd. p. 336. ISBN 978-0-9536984-1-7. ASIN 0953698416.
- Dodds, Glen Lyndon (2011). A History of Sunderland (Third ed.). Sunderland: Albion Press. ISBN 978-0-9525122-2-6.
