= List of United Kingdom locations: Hop-Ht =

The United Kingdom

This is part of the list of United Kingdom locations: a gazetteer of place names in the United Kingdom showing each place's locality and geographical coordinates.

== Hop-Hos ==
Location	Locality	Coordinates (links to map & photo sources)	OS grid reference
Hopcroft's Holt	Oxfordshire	51.92°N 01.33°W	SP4625
Hope	Derbyshire	53.34°N 01.76°W	SK1683
Hope	Flintshire	53.11°N 03.04°W	SJ3058
Hope	Staffordshire	53.09°N 01.82°W	SK1255
Hope	Shropshire	52.60°N 02.97°W	SJ3401
Hope Bagot	Shropshire	52.36°N 02.61°W	SO5874
Hopebeck	Cumbria	54.60°N 03.30°W	NY1624
Hope Bowdler	Shropshire	52.52°N 02.78°W	SO4792
Hopedale	Staffordshire	53.09°N 01.82°W	SK1255
Hope End Green	Essex	51.85°N 00.27°E	TL5720
Hope Green	Cheshire	53.33°N 02.13°W	SJ9182
Hopeman	Moray	57.70°N 03.44°W	NJ1469
Hope Mansell	Herefordshire	51.86°N 02.55°W	SO6219
Hope Park	Shropshire	52.60°N 03.00°W	SJ3201
Hopesay	Shropshire	52.44°N 02.89°W	SO3983
Hopesgate	Shropshire	52.60°N 02.99°W	SJ3301
Hope's Green	Essex	51.54°N 00.55°E	TQ7786
Hope's Rough	Herefordshire	52.12°N 02.54°W	SO6347
Hopetown	Wakefield	53.70°N 01.41°W	SE3923
Hope under Dinmore	Herefordshire	52.16°N 02.73°W	SO5052
Hopgood's Green	Berkshire	51.41°N 01.23°W	SU5369
Hopkinstown	Rhondda, Cynon, Taff	51.60°N 03.35°W	ST0690
Hopley's Green	Herefordshire	52.16°N 02.96°W	SO3452
Hopperton	North Yorkshire	53.99°N 01.36°W	SE4256
Hop Pole	Lincolnshire	52.70°N 00.25°W	TF1813
Hopsford	Warwickshire	52.45°N 01.38°W	SP4284
Hopstone	Shropshire	52.54°N 02.32°W	SO7894
Hopton	Derbyshire	53.07°N 01.62°W	SK2553
Hopton	Shropshire	52.77°N 02.92°W	SJ3820
Hopton	Staffordshire	52.83°N 02.09°W	SJ9426
Hopton	Suffolk	52.37°N 00.92°E	TL9979
Hoptonbank	Shropshire	52.39°N 02.55°W	SO6277
Hopton Cangeford	Shropshire	52.41°N 02.67°W	SO5480
Hopton Castle	Shropshire	52.39°N 02.94°W	SO3678
Hoptongate	Shropshire	52.41°N 02.69°W	SO5380
Hopton Heath	Shropshire	52.39°N 02.91°W	SO3877
Hopton Heath	Staffordshire	52.83°N 02.07°W	SJ9526
Hopton on Sea	Norfolk	52.53°N 01.74°E	TG5400
Hopton Wafers	Shropshire	52.38°N 02.54°W	SO6376
Hopwas	Staffordshire	52.64°N 01.75°W	SK1705
Hopwood	Worcestershire	52.36°N 01.97°W	SP0274
Hopwood	Rochdale	53.57°N 02.21°W	SD8609
Hopworthy	Devon	50.79°N 04.41°W	SS3002
Horam	East Sussex	50.93°N 00.23°E	TQ5717
Horbling	Lincolnshire	52.90°N 00.35°W	TF1135
Horbury	Wakefield	53.65°N 01.56°W	SE2918
Horbury Bridge	Wakefield	53.64°N 01.57°W	SE2817
Horbury Junction	Wakefield	53.64°N 01.54°W	SE3017
Horcott	Gloucestershire	51.69°N 01.78°W	SP1500
Horden	Durham	54.76°N 01.31°W	NZ4441
Hordle	Hampshire	50.75°N 01.61°W	SZ2795
Hordley	Shropshire	52.86°N 02.92°W	SJ3830
Horeb	Ceredigion	52.05°N 04.34°W	SN3942
Horeb (Llanegwad)	Carmarthenshire	51.93°N 04.16°W	SN5128
Horeb (near Llanelli)	Carmarthenshire	51.72°N 04.18°W	SN4905
Horeb	Flintshire	53.10°N 03.07°W	SJ2857
Horfield	City of Bristol	51.48°N 02.59°W	ST5976
Horgabost	Western Isles	57.85°N 06.99°W	NG0496
Horham	Suffolk	52.30°N 01.24°E	TM2172
Horkstow	North Lincolnshire	53.64°N 00.51°W	SE9818
Horkstow Wolds	North Lincolnshire	53.65°N 00.50°W	SE9919
Horley	Surrey	51.17°N 00.17°W	TQ2843
Horley	Oxfordshire	52.08°N 01.40°W	SP4143
Horn Ash	Dorset	50.83°N 02.86°W	ST3904
Hornblotton	Somerset	51.10°N 02.58°W	ST5934
Hornblotton Green	Somerset	51.09°N 02.60°W	ST5833
Hornby	Lancashire	54.10°N 02.64°W	SD5868
Hornby (Richmondshire)	North Yorkshire	54.33°N 01.66°W	SE2293
Hornby (Hambleton)	North Yorkshire	54.43°N 01.44°W	NZ3605
Horncastle	Berkshire	51.44°N 01.03°W	SU6772
Horncastle	Lincolnshire	53.20°N 00.11°W	TF2669
Hornchurch	Havering	51.55°N 00.20°E	TQ5386
Horncliffe	Northumberland	55.73°N 02.12°W	NT9249
Horndean	Hampshire	50.91°N 01.00°W	SU7013
Horndean	Scottish Borders	55.73°N 02.17°W	NT8949
Horndon	Devon	50.60°N 04.09°W	SX5280
Horndon-on-the-Hill	Essex	51.52°N 00.39°E	TQ6683
Horne	Surrey	51.17°N 00.09°W	TQ3344
Horner	Somerset	51.19°N 03.59°W	SS8945
Horne Row	Essex	51.70°N 00.56°E	TL7704
Horner's Green	Suffolk	52.03°N 00.85°E	TL9641
Hornestreet	Essex	51.95°N 00.93°E	TM0232
Horneval	Highland	57.43°N 06.55°W	NG2747
Horney Common	East Sussex	51.00°N 00.06°E	TQ4525
Horn Hill	Somerset	51.15°N 03.10°W	ST2340
Hornick	Cornwall	50.34°N 04.85°W	SW9753
Horning	Norfolk	52.70°N 01.46°E	TG3417
Horninghold	Leicestershire	52.56°N 00.82°W	SP8097
Horninglow	Staffordshire	52.82°N 01.64°W	SK2425
Horningsea	Cambridgeshire	52.23°N 00.18°E	TL4962
Horningsham	Wiltshire	51.16°N 02.27°W	ST8141
Horningtoft	Norfolk	52.77°N 00.85°E	TF9323
Horningtops	Cornwall	50.41°N 04.43°W	SX2760
Horn Park	Greenwich	51.447°N 0.026°E	TQ408739
Hornsbury	Somerset	50.88°N 02.95°W	ST3310
Hornsby	Cumbria	54.84°N 02.76°W	NY5150
Horns Cross	Devon	50.98°N 04.30°W	SS3823
Horns Cross	East Sussex	50.96°N 00.59°E	TQ8222
Hornsea	East Riding of Yorkshire	53.90°N 00.17°W	TA2047
Hornsea Burton	East Riding of Yorkshire	53.89°N 00.17°W	TA2046
Hornsey	Haringey	51.58°N 00.12°W	TQ3089
Hornsey Vale	Haringey	51.57°N 00.12°W	TQ3088
Horns Green	Bromley	51.30°N 00.07°E	TQ4558
Horn Street (Folkestone)	Kent	51.07°N 01.11°E	TR1835
Horn Street (Birling)	Kent	51.31°N 00.42°E	TQ6960
Hornton	Oxfordshire	52.10°N 01.43°W	SP3945
Horpit	Swindon	51.55°N 01.69°W	SU2184
Horrabridge	Devon	50.50°N 04.10°W	SX5169
Horringer	Suffolk	52.21°N 00.66°E	TL8261
Horrocks Fold	Bolton	53.61°N 02.45°W	SD7013
Horrocksford	Lancashire	53.88°N 02.39°W	SD7443
Horsalls	Kent	51.25°N 00.67°E	TQ8754
Horsebridge	Hampshire	51.06°N 01.51°W	SU3430
Horsebridge	Devon	50.54°N 04.25°W	SX4074
Horse Bridge	Staffordshire	53.07°N 02.06°W	SJ9653
Horsebridge	Shropshire	52.64°N 02.94°W	SJ3606
Horsebrook	Devon	50.40°N 03.81°W	SX7158
Horsebrook	Staffordshire	52.68°N 02.17°W	SJ8810
Horsecastle	North Somerset	51.39°N 02.83°W	ST4266
Horsedown	Wiltshire	51.50°N 02.24°W	ST8379
Horsedowns	Cornwall	50.15°N 05.34°W	SW6134
Horsehay	Shropshire	52.66°N 02.48°W	SJ6707
Horseheath	Cambridgeshire	52.09°N 00.34°E	TL6147
Horsehouse	North Yorkshire	54.22°N 01.94°W	SE0481
Horse Island	Shetland Islands	59.85°N 01.31°W	HU382075
Horse Island	Highland	57.98°N 05.34°W	NC023046
Horseley Heath	Sandwell	52.52°N 02.04°W	SO9792
Horsell	Surrey	51.32°N 00.58°W	SU9959
Horsell Birch	Surrey	51.32°N 00.59°W	SU9859
Horseman's Green	Wrexham	52.96°N 02.83°W	SJ4441
Horseman Side	Essex	51.64°N 00.22°E	TQ5496
Horsemere Green	West Sussex	50.80°N 00.59°W	SU9902
Horsenden	Buckinghamshire	51.71°N 00.85°W	SP7902
Horsepools	Gloucestershire	51.78°N 02.23°W	SO8410
Horseway	Cambridgeshire	52.45°N 00.08°E	TL4286
Horseway Head	Herefordshire	52.23°N 02.96°W	SO3460
Horsey	Somerset	51.14°N 02.97°W	ST3239
Horsey	Norfolk	52.74°N 01.62°E	TG4522
Horsey Corner	Norfolk	52.74°N 01.62°E	TG4523
Horsey Down	Wiltshire	51.63°N 01.87°W	SU0993
Horsey Island	Essex	51.87°N 01.24°E	TM231249
Horsford	Norfolk	52.69°N 01.23°E	TG1916
Horsforth	Leeds	53.83°N 01.63°W	SE2438
Horsforth Woodside	Leeds	53.82°N 01.63°W	SE2437
Horsham	West Sussex	51.06°N 00.33°W	TQ1731
Horsham	Worcestershire	52.21°N 02.39°W	SO7357
Horsham St Faith	Norfolk	52.68°N 01.26°E	TG2115
Horseshoe Green	Kent	51.15°N 00.10°E	TQ4742
Horsington	Somerset	51.00°N 02.42°W	ST7023
Horsington	Lincolnshire	53.19°N 00.21°W	TF1968
Horsley	Gloucestershire	51.68°N 02.24°W	ST8398
Horsley (Hexham)	Northumberland	54.98°N 01.86°W	NZ0966
Horsley (Rochester)	Northumberland	55.25°N 02.25°W	NY8496
Horsley	Derbyshire	52.99°N 01.43°W	SK3844
Horsley Cross	Essex	51.90°N 01.08°E	TM1227
Horsleycross Street	Essex	51.91°N 01.08°E	TM1228
Horsleyhill	Scottish Borders	55.46°N 02.74°W	NT5319
Horsley Hill	South Tyneside	54.97°N 01.40°W	NZ3865
Horsleyhope	Durham	54.81°N 01.92°W	NZ0547
Horsleys Green	Buckinghamshire	51.64°N 00.87°W	SU7895
Horsley Woodhouse	Derbyshire	52.99°N 01.42°W	SK3944
Horsmonden	Kent	51.13°N 00.42°E	TQ7040
Horspath	Oxfordshire	51.73°N 01.17°W	SP5704
Horstead	Norfolk	52.72°N 01.34°E	TG2619
Horsted Green	East Sussex	50.95°N 00.07°E	TQ4619
Horsted Keynes	West Sussex	51.03°N 00.03°W	TQ3828
Horton	Berkshire	51.46°N 00.54°W	TQ0175
Horton	Buckinghamshire	51.86°N 00.66°W	SP9219
Horton	Dorset	50.86°N 01.95°W	SU0307
Horton	Kent	51.25°N 01.02°E	TR1155
Horton	Lancashire	53.94°N 02.23°W	SD8550
Horton	Northamptonshire	52.17°N 00.81°W	SP8154
Horton (Hadley)	Shropshire	52.72°N 02.47°W	SJ6814
Horton (Wem Rural)	Shropshire	52.86°N 02.75°W	SJ4930
Horton	Somerset	50.92°N 02.96°W	ST3214
Horton	South Gloucestershire	51.55°N 02.34°W	ST7684
Horton	Staffordshire	53.11°N 02.09°W	SJ9457
Horton	Swansea	51.54°N 04.20°W	SS4785
Horton	Wiltshire	51.36°N 01.92°W	SU0563
Horton Common	Dorset	50.85°N 01.90°W	SU0706
Horton Cross	Somerset	50.93°N 02.95°W	ST3315
Horton-cum-Studley	Oxfordshire	51.80°N 01.14°W	SP5912
Horton Green	Cheshire	53.03°N 02.82°W	SJ4549
Horton Heath	Dorset	50.85°N 01.91°W	SU0606
Horton Heath	Hampshire	50.94°N 01.30°W	SU4916
Horton in Ribblesdale	North Yorkshire	54.14°N 02.30°W	SD8072
Horton Kirby	Kent	51.38°N 00.24°E	TQ5668
Hortonlane	Shropshire	52.69°N 02.83°W	SJ4411
Horton Wharf	Buckinghamshire	51.86°N 00.65°W	SP9319
Hortonwood	Shropshire	52.71°N 02.47°W	SJ6813
Horwich	Bolton	53.59°N 02.56°W	SD6311
Horwich End	Derbyshire	53.31°N 02.00°W	SK0080
Horwood	Devon	51.02°N 04.14°W	SS5027
Horwood Riding	South Gloucestershire	51.56°N 02.37°W	ST7485
Hoscar	Lancashire	53.59°N 02.81°W	SD4611
Hose	Leicestershire	52.85°N 00.91°W	SK7329
Hoselaw	Scottish Borders	55.58°N 02.31°W	NT8032
Hosey Hill	Kent	51.25°N 00.07°E	TQ4553
Hosh	Perth and Kinross	56.38°N 03.86°W	NN8523
Hosta	Western Isles	57.61°N 07.49°W	NF7272
Hoswick	Shetland Islands	59.99°N 01.26°W	HU4123

== Hot-Hoy ==
Location	Locality	Coordinates (links to map & photo sources)	OS grid reference
Hotham	East Riding of Yorkshire	53.79°N 00.65°W	SE8934
Hothfield	Kent	51.16°N 00.81°E	TQ9744
Hotley Bottom	Buckinghamshire	51.70°N 00.74°W	SP8701
Hoton	Leicestershire	52.79°N 01.15°W	SK5722
Hotwells	City of Bristol	51.44°N 02.62°W	ST5772
Houbie	Shetland Islands	60.58°N 00.86°W	HU6290
Hough (Alderley Edge)	Cheshire	53.29°N 02.22°W	SJ8578
Hough (near Crewe)	Cheshire	53.04°N 02.43°W	SJ7150
Hough	Argyll and Bute	56.49°N 06.95°W	NL9545
Hougham	Lincolnshire	52.98°N 00.69°W	SK8844
Hougharry	Western Isles	57.60°N 07.52°W	NF7071
Hough Green	Knowsley	53.36°N 02.78°W	SJ4886
Hough-on-the-Hill	Lincolnshire	53.00°N 00.63°W	SK9246
Hough Side	Leeds	53.79°N 01.65°W	SE2333
Houghton	Cambridgeshire	52.33°N 00.12°W	TL2872
Houghton	Cumbria	54.92°N 02.93°W	NY4059
Houghton	East Riding of Yorkshire	53.84°N 00.65°W	SE8839
Houghton	Hampshire	51.08°N 01.51°W	SU3432
Houghton	Norfolk	52.82°N 00.66°E	TF7927
Houghton	Northumberland	54.98°N 01.81°W	NZ1266
Houghton	Pembrokeshire	51.726°N 04.92°W	SM985072
Houghton	West Sussex	50.88°N 00.56°W	TQ0111
Houghton Bank	Darlington	54.59°N 01.66°W	NZ2222
Houghton Conquest	Bedfordshire	52.05°N 00.48°W	TL0441
Houghton Green	East Sussex	50.96°N 00.73°E	TQ9222
Houghton Green	Cheshire	53.41°N 02.57°W	SJ6291
Houghton-le-Side	Darlington	54.58°N 01.66°W	NZ2221
Houghton-le-Spring	Sunderland	54.83°N 01.47°W	NZ3449
Houghton on the Hill	Leicestershire	52.62°N 01.01°W	SK6703
Houghton Regis	Bedfordshire	51.90°N 00.53°W	TL0124
Houghton St Giles	Norfolk	52.87°N 00.85°E	TF9235
Houghwood	St Helens	53.49°N 02.74°W	SD5100
Houlland (Scalloway)	Shetland Islands	60.14°N 01.28°W	HU4040
Houlland (Sandwick)	Shetland Islands	59.99°N 01.24°W	HU4223
Houlland (near Bixter)	Shetland Islands	60.26°N 01.38°W	HU3453
Houlland (Yell)	Shetland Islands	60.50°N 01.09°W	HU5080
Houlsyke	North Yorkshire	54.45°N 00.87°W	NZ7307
Houlton	Warwickshire	52.357°N 01.188°W	SP5573
Hound	Hampshire	50.86°N 01.33°W	SU4708
Hound Green	Hampshire	51.32°N 00.96°W	SU7259
Hound Hill	Dorset	50.80°N 02.01°W	ST9901
Houndmills	Hampshire	51.26°N 01.11°W	SU6252
Houndscroft	Gloucestershire	51.71°N 02.21°W	SO8502
Houndslow	Scottish Borders	55.71°N 02.59°W	NT6347
Houndsmoor	Somerset	51.01°N 03.25°W	ST1225
Houndstone	Somerset	50.95°N 02.68°W	ST5217
Houndwood	Scottish Borders	55.86°N 02.25°W	NT8463
Hounsdown	Hampshire	50.90°N 01.50°W	SU3512
Hounsley Batch	North Somerset	51.36°N 02.66°W	ST5463
Hounslow	London Borough of Hounslow	51.46°N 00.36°W	TQ1475
Hounslow Green	Essex	51.83°N 00.39°E	TL6518
Hounslow West	Hounslow	51.47°N 00.38°W	TQ1276
Hourston	Orkney Islands	59.05°N 03.23°W	HY2919
Housabister	Shetland Islands	60.30°N 01.11°W	HU4958
Housay	Shetland Islands	60.41°N 00.78°W	HU6771
Houses Hill	Kirklees	53.64°N 01.71°W	SE1916
Housetter	Shetland Islands	60.53°N 01.34°W	HU3684
Housham Tye	Essex	51.76°N 00.17°E	TL5010
Houss	Shetland Islands	60.06°N 01.33°W	HU3731
Houston	Renfrewshire	55.86°N 04.55°W	NS4066
Houstry	Highland	58.29°N 03.45°W	ND1535
Houton	Orkney Islands	58.91°N 03.20°W	HY3104
Hove	Brighton and Hove	50.83°N 00.18°W	TQ2805
Hove Edge	Calderdale	53.71°N 01.80°W	SE1324
Hoveringham	Nottinghamshire	53.00°N 00.97°W	SK6946
Hoveton	Norfolk	52.71°N 01.40°E	TG3018
Hovingham	North Yorkshire	54.16°N 00.99°W	SE6675
How	Cumbria	54.89°N 02.78°W	NY5056
Howbeck Bank	Cheshire	53.03°N 02.47°W	SJ6849
Howbrook	Barnsley	53.47°N 01.51°W	SK3298
Howbury	Bexley	51.468°N 00.197°E	TQ527766
How Caple	Herefordshire	51.96°N 02.58°W	SO6030
Howden	East Riding of Yorkshire	53.74°N 00.87°W	SE7428
Howden	West Lothian	55.88°N 03.52°W	NT0567
Howden Clough	Kirklees	53.73°N 01.65°W	SE2326
Howdendyke	East Riding of Yorkshire	53.73°N 00.86°W	SE755269
Howden-le-Wear	Durham	54.69°N 01.76°W	NZ1533
Howdon	North Tyneside	54.99°N 01.50°W	NZ3267
Howdon Pans	North Tyneside	54.98°N 01.48°W	NZ3366
Howe	Norfolk	52.54°N 01.34°E	TM2799
Howe	North Yorkshire	54.21°N 01.46°W	SE3580
Howe Bridge	Wigan	53.51°N 02.51°W	SD6602
Howegreen (Maldon)	Essex	51.67°N 00.64°E	TL8301
Howe Green	Warwickshire	52.48°N 01.54°W	SP3188
Howe Green (Uttlesford)	Essex	51.84°N 00.19°E	TL5118
Howe Green (Chelmsford)	Essex	51.69°N 00.51°E	TL7403
Howell	Lincolnshire	52.99°N 00.31°W	TF1346
How End	Bedfordshire	52.04°N 00.49°W	TL0340
Howe of Teuchar	Aberdeenshire	57.50°N 02.35°W	NJ7946
Howe Street (Chelmsford)	Essex	51.79°N 00.44°E	TL6914
Howe Street (Braintree)	Essex	51.97°N 00.45°E	TL6934
Howey	Powys	52.21°N 03.39°W	SO0558
Howford (Ettrickbridge)	Scottish Borders	55.50°N 02.96°W	NT3924
Howford (Innerleithen)	Scottish Borders	55.61°N 03.09°W	NT3136
Howgate	Cumbria	54.57°N 03.56°W	NX9921
Howgate	Midlothian	55.80°N 03.21°W	NT2458
Howgill	North Yorkshire	54.02°N 01.90°W	SE0659
Howgill	Lancashire	53.91°N 02.27°W	SD8246
Howgill	Cumbria	54.35°N 02.57°W	SD6396
How Green	Kent	51.19°N 00.10°E	TQ4746
How Hill	Cumbria	54.72°N 02.95°E	NY3936
How Hill	Norfolk	52.71°N 01.50°E	TG3719
Howick	Monmouthshire	51.65°N 02.72°W	ST5095
Howick	Northumberland	55.44°N 01.60°W	NU2517
Howick Cross	Lancashire	53.73°N 02.75°W	SD5027
Howle	Shropshire	52.80°N 02.46°W	SJ6923
Howleigh	Somerset	50.95°N 03.14°W	ST2018
Howlett End	Essex	51.98°N 00.29°E	TL5834
Howley	Somerset	50.87°N 03.05°W	ST2609
Howley	Gloucestershire	51.64°N 02.37°W	ST7494
Howley	Cheshire	53.38°N 02.58°W	SJ6188
Hownam	Scottish Borders	55.46°N 02.36°W	NT7719
Howpasley	Scottish Borders	55.35°N 03.04°W	NT3407
Howsen	Worcestershire	52.18°N 02.30°W	SO7954
Howsham	North Lincolnshire	53.52°N 00.43°W	TA0404
Howsham	North Yorkshire	54.04°N 00.88°W	SE7362
Howtel	Northumberland	55.60°N 02.17°W	NT8934
Howt Green	Kent	51.35°N 00.71°E	TQ8965
Howton	Herefordshire	51.95°N 02.86°W	SO4129
Howtown	Cumbria	54.56°N 02.86°W	NY4419
How Wood	Hertfordshire	51.71°N 00.36°W	TL1303
Howwood	Renfrewshire	55.80°N 04.57°W	NS3960
Hoxne	Suffolk	52.34°N 01.19°E	TM1877
Hoxton	Hackney	51.53°N 00.08°W	TQ3383
Hoy	Shetland Islands	60.18°N 01.33°W	HU371447
Hoy (island)	Orkney Islands	58.83°N 03.25°W	ND2795
Hoy (hamlet)	Orkney Islands	58.90°N 03.35°W	HY2203
Hoylake	Wirral	53.38°N 03.18°W	SJ2188
Hoyland	Barnsley	53.49°N 01.44°W	SE3700
Hoyland Common	Barnsley	53.49°N 01.47°W	SE3500
Hoylandswaine	Barnsley	53.53°N 01.60°W	SE2604
Hoyle	West Sussex	50.95°N 00.71°W	SU9018
Hoyle Mill	Barnsley	53.54°N 01.45°W	SE3606
