= Thomas Bramston =

Thomas Bramston may refer to:

- Thomas Bramston (1658–1737), MP for Maldon, 1712–1727
- Thomas Bramston (died 1765) (c. 1690–1765), MP for Maldon
- Thomas Gardiner Bramston (1770–1831), English politician, Member of Parliament (MP) for Essex, son of Thomas Berney Bramston and father of Thomas William Bramston
- Thomas Berney Bramston (1733–1813), British MP for Essex
- Thomas William Bramston (1796–1871), British MP for South Essex, 1835–1865
