= Phil Powers (disambiguation) =

Phil Powers is a wrestler.

Phil(ip) Powers may also refer to:

- Phil Powers (baseball)
- Phil Powers (climber)
- Philip Powers, record producer

== See also ==
- Phil Power, football manager
- Philip Power, chemist
