= Howe Green =

Howe Green may refer to the following places in England:

- Howe Green, Derbyshire
- Howe Green, Chelmsford, Essex
- Howe Green, Uttlesford, a hamlet in Great Hallingbury parish, Essex
- Howe Green, Warwickshire, a location
- Howegreen, a location in the Maldon district of Essex

See also

- How Green, a location in Kent
