= McPhie =

McPhie is a surname. Notable people with the surname include:

- Heather McPhie (born 1984), American skier
- James McPhie (1894–1918), Scottish World War I Victoria Cross recipient
- Jim McPhie (1920–2002), Scottish footballer and manager
- Leland McPhie (1914–2015), American athlete
- Mad Dog McPhie (born 1971), English professional wrestler
- Sandy McPhie (1929–2015), Australian politician

== See also ==
- Brian MacPhie, American tennis player
