= Adam Dawson =

Adam Dawson may refer to:

- Adam Dawson (colonial administrator), administrator of the English East India Company, president of Bengal in the eighteenth century
- Adam Dawson (distiller) (1793–1873), Scottish industrialist
- Adam Dawson (footballer) (born 1992), English footballer
- Adam Alexander Dawson (1913–2010), film editor
