= Danbury, Essex =

Village in Essex, England

Coordinates: 51.715°N 0.582°E

Danbury
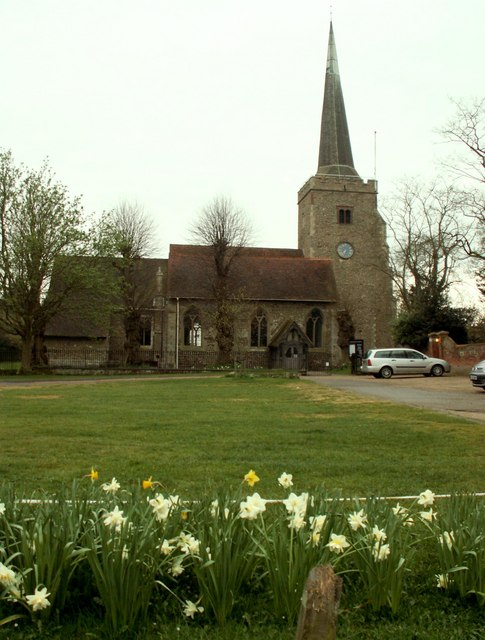
- St John the Baptist church

- Location within Essex
- Population: 5,197 (Parish, 2021)
- OS grid reference: TL783050
- District: City of Chelmsford
- Shire county: Essex
- Region: East
- Country: England
- Sovereign state: United Kingdom
- Post town: Chelmsford
- Postcode district: CM3
- Dialling code: 01245
- Police: Essex
- Fire: Essex
- Ambulance: East of England
- UK Parliament: Maldon

Danbury is a village and civil parish in the Chelmsford district of Essex, England. It is located 33.5 miles (53.9 km) northeast of Charing Cross, London. It is situated on a hill 367 feet (112 m) above sea level. At the 2021 census the parish had a population of 5,197.

The city of Danbury, Connecticut in the United States is named after the village.

== Origins ==
The village was built on the site of a Neolithic or early Iron Age hill fort noted for its oval shape, sometimes confused with the Megalithic enclosure at Danebury in Hampshire.

According to the official parish publication, Danbury Parish Plan 2003, first Iron Age settlers, then the Romans and finally the Dæningas tribe of Saxons occupied the Danbury area.

The place-name 'Danbury' is first attested in the Domesday Book of 1086 as Danengeberia in the hundred of Chelmsford. The name means 'the burgh or fort of Dene's people'. The same name is the origin of the name of the village and peninsula of Dengie in Essex.

After the Norman Conquest, King William the Conqueror took the lands and settlement and granted it to Geoffrey de Mandeville, who was made Earl of Essex.

== Medieval to Georgian period ==
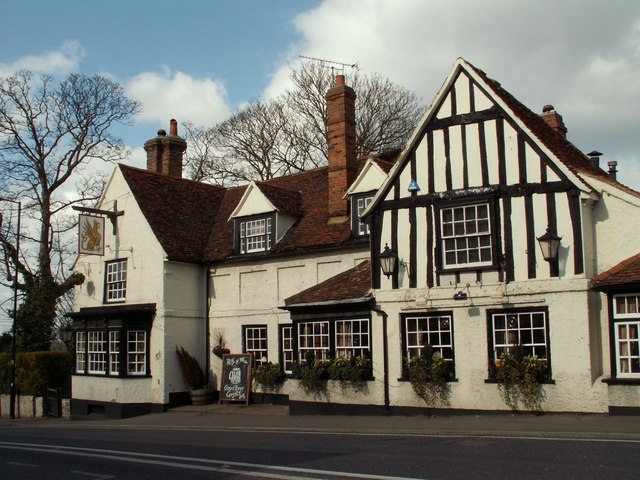
The Griffin Inn where Sir Walter Scott stayed in 1808

In medieval times Danbury developed from two manors, St Cleres/Herons and Runsell. Traces of both still exist. There was also a small part of a third, now extinct, manor of Gibcracks. The church of St John the Baptist is the oldest building in the village, dating from the 13th century, and is grade I listed. There is a local folk tale that the church's spire was damaged by the Devil in the guise of a monk in the year 1402. According to the legend, the Devil passed between the legs of a parishioner as he departed, and the man later died of a wasting disease.

The village has a long connection with the Sinclair family, known locally as St Clere. There are three wooden effigies in the church which date back to the thirteenth and fourteenth century One has been identified as being that of William St Clere. In 1968 it was taken to be exhibited at the Louvre in Paris.

In 1779 the tomb of a knight was disturbed, and the body therein was discovered to be perfectly preserved in what was described as "pickle", but this was contested by Joseph Strutt, Member of Parliament (MP) for Maldon. Strutt also attempted to write a romance with a book called Queenhoo Hall. In 1808, Sir Walter Scott was asked to complete the book by his publisher John Murray. Scott visited the village and stayed at the Griffin Inn in order to attempt his first venture into romantic fiction.

== Victorian period ==
The Church had fallen into some decay by the early 19th century when efforts were made to repair it. A much more significant restoration began in 1866 when George Gilbert Scott was engaged for the project. The Church was closed for over a year and seating capacity was increased from 434 to 569. The pews today still include at least 3 medieval ones. Many pews feature distinctive poppy heads.

The church also contains some memorial slabs to the Mildmays. Sir Walter Mildmay was the founder of Emmanuel College, Cambridge and built Danbury Place in 1589. The original building has disappeared but another was built in 1832 in the Tudor Revival style, with red brick. It was acquired by the Church of England in 1845 and became a residence of the Bishop of Rochester, known as Danbury Palace, until 1892. Subsequently the house was in private hands, used as a maternity home during the 1939–45 War, acquired by the local authority as a college and then disposed of to developers. The house has now been converted into apartments.

The mansion sits within the historic landscape of Danbury Country Park, a former medieval deer park, with later additions dating from the 18th and 19th centuries. It is now owned by Essex County Council and has been adapted for youth activities by Essex Outdoors. The history of the park and garden was researched by Kate Felus in 2007.

== Modern day ==
The village is at the centre of extensive areas of woodland and heath owned by the National Trust and other conservation organisations. Danbury Common, a Site of Special Scientific Interest lies due south of the village centre. The woodlands extend into the parish of Little Baddow. However the quietude of the surrounding countryside contrasts with the A414 road, a major trunk route running through the village centre linking it with Maldon to the east and Chelmsford to the west. Several bus services running from Chelmsford link Danbury with Maldon, Great Baddow, Little Baddow, South Woodham Ferrers, Sandon and other villages around Maldon.

Danbury has its own community magazine called The Focus, which is also delivered to Bicknacre and Little Baddow.

== Geodesy ==
Danbury church spire was the origin (meridian) for the 6-inch and 1:2500 Ordnance Survey maps of Huntingdonshire, Cambridgeshire, Norfolk and Suffolk. Originally it also was the origin for Essex, but that county was recalculated on the meridian of St. Paul's, London, in about 1919, because Greater London started to spill out well into Essex.

== Education ==
There are several primary schools in Danbury but no secondary schools. The primary schools are: Danbury Park Community Primary School, St. John's Church of England Primary School, Heathcote Preparatory School and Elm Green Preparatory School.

== International relations ==
=== Twin towns ===
- Croissy-sur-Seine, Ile-de-France, France

== Notable people ==
- Peter Ashdown (born 1934), former motor racing driver
- Barrie Drewitt-Barlow (born 1968), businessman associated with Maldon & Tiptree F.C.
- Cecil Armstrong Gibbs (1889–1960), English composer
- Graham Harvey (born 1944), British sports shooter
- Neil Innes (1944–2019), English writer, comedian and musician
- Jeremy Lloyd (1930–2014), English writer, screenwriter, author, poet and actor
- Phil Powers (born 1978), English professional wrestler
- Ralph Vaughan Williams composed his oratorio Sancta Civitas in Danbury, 1923

== Nearby places ==
- Woodham Walter
- Bicknacre
- East Hanningfield
- Great Baddow
- Little Baddow
- Maldon
- Sandon
- South Woodham Ferrers

== Bibliography ==
- Moore, Wendy; Moore, David (1997). Danbury Walks: Six Circular Walks Around the Danbury Countryside. Essex County Council. ISBN 1-85281-150-1.
- Felus, Kate (2007). Danbury Park – A Guide to the Historic Landscape. UK: Essex County Council. ISBN 978-1-84194-078-6.
- Mills, A. D. (1998). Oxford Dictionary of English Place Names. Oxford University Press. ISBN 0-19-280074-4.
- Danbury Parish Plan 2003. Danbury Parish Council. 2004.
