= William Fytche (MP) =

English politician

William Fytche (c. 1671–1728) was an English politician, Member of Parliament for Maldon in Essex.

== Life ==
He was the son of Sir Barrow Fytche of Woodham Walter, Essex and his wife Elizabeth, daughter of Sir Mundeford Bramston. After his father died, in 1673, he was brought up by his uncle George Bramston, an academic and judge, and a Tory. He appointed William Bramston, brother of George and defender of Anglican orthodoxy, Rector of Woodham Walter in 1686.

Fytche stood for parliament at Maldon in 1698, when he lost to Irby Montagu, brother of Charles Montagu; he was then twice successful in 1701. He dropped out of what was by then a safe seat, intending to pursue a position as an official, with the assistance of Henry St John; but he stood again in 1711, becoming a lottery comptroller, and so resigning his seat.

== Death ==
He died on 12 September 1728, at age 57.

== Family ==
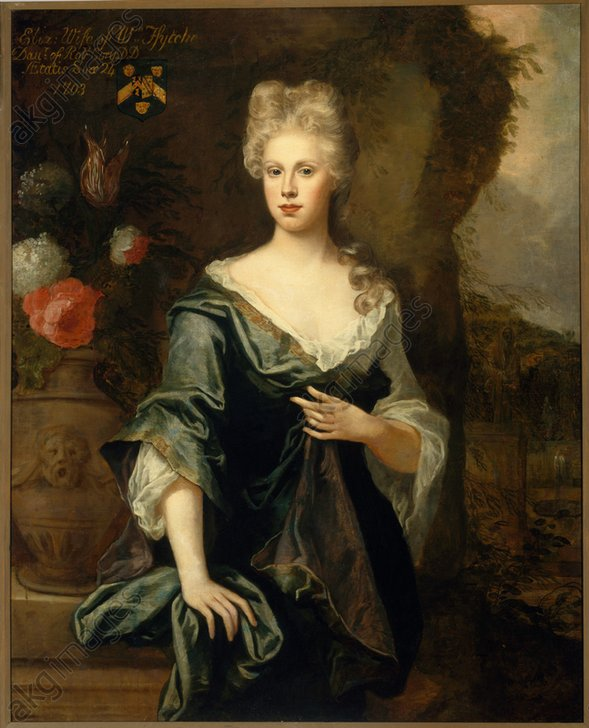
Elizabeth Fytche

Fytche married Mary, daughter of Robert Corey of Danbury: they had five sons and eight daughters. Their youngest son was William Fytche, briefly Governor of Bengal. His wife is elsewhere known as Elizabeth.

== Notes ==
Parliament of England
Preceded by Irby Montagu; John Bullock	Member of Parliament for Maldon; January 1701 – 1707; With: Irby Montagu to Nov 1701; John Comyns from Nov 1701	Succeeded by Parliament of Great Britain
Parliament of Great Britain
Preceded by Parliament of England	Member of Parliament for Maldon; 1707 – 1708; With: John Comyns	Succeeded by Sir Richard Child; Thomas Richmond
Preceded by Thomas Richmond; John Comyns	Member of Parliament for Maldon; 1711–1712; With: John Comyns	Succeeded by Thomas Bramston; John Comyns
