= Samuel Rose =

Samuel Rose may refer to:

- Samuel Rose (barrister) (1767–1804), English barrister and editor
- Samuel Rose (Philadelphia politician) (1911–1960), American politician
- Samuel Rose (bishop) (born 1975), Canadian Anglican bishop
- Samuel Rose (artist), one of relatively few Hallgarten prize winners
