= Horton Heath =

Horton Heath may refer to

- Horton Heath, Dorset, United Kingdom
- Horton Heath, Hampshire, United Kingdom
