= Horsham (disambiguation) =

Horsham may refer to places called:

- Horsham, a town in West Sussex, England
  - Horsham (district), a local government district in West Sussex
  - Horsham (UK Parliament constituency), a County Constituency in West Sussex
- Horsham, Worcestershire, a village in England
- Horsham Township, Pennsylvania, a settlement in the Delaware Valley
  - Horsham, Pennsylvania, a census-designated place within Horsham Township
- Horsham, Victoria, Australia
- Rural City of Horsham, in Australia

Horsham may also refer to:

- Horsham F.C., a West Sussex football club currently playing in the Isthmian League Premier Division
- Horsham Museum, the local history museum for Horsham and its surroundings
