= William de Ferrers School =

Coordinates: 51.6461°N 0.6199°E

Location
- Trinity Square; South Woodham Ferrers, Essex, CM3 5JU; England

Information
- Type: Academy
- Established: 1982
- Local authority: Essex
- Trust: William de Ferrers School
- Specialists: Sports, maths and computing
- Department for Education URN: 136605 Tables
- Ofsted: Reports
- Executive Headteacher: James Donaldson
- Gender: Mixed
- Age: 11 to 18
- Enrolment: 1520
- Capacity: 2076
- Website: http://www.williamdeferrers.essex.sch.uk

William de Ferrers School is a co-educational British secondary school in the town of South Woodham Ferrers, in the English county of Essex. It is an academy school and has 1,259 pupils on roll, aged between 11 and 18. It has been awarded specialist sports, maths and computing college status. In 2011, it won the BBC Essex best sports school award.

== History ==
William de Ferrers was founded in 1982 and was opened in 1983 by Sir Keith Joseph (Secretary of State for Education and Science). The school bears the name of the Norman knight who was granted the land of the local area for his role in the Norman Conquest; the badge is his shield.

The school has had 5 headteachers since its creation:

- Dennis Parry from 1982 to his retirement in 2007
- Russell Ayling from 2007 to 2013
- Neal McGowan from 2013 to 2016, when he was charged with sexual offences against boys at the school
- Mike Applewhite from 2016 to July 2024
- James Donaldson from 2024 to present

== Extracurricular Activities ==
The school has been praised for providing several extracurricular activities by Ofsted saying "Provision is greatly enhanced by extra-curricular activities, especially in sport. A major success through excellent care, guidance and support systems".

Activities range from the Duke of Edinburgh Award, sports, music, dance and drama. The school also offers a number of trips away both in the UK and within Europe with more recently trips to North and South America, China and Iceland being organised.
