= South Woodham Ferrers =

Town in Essex, England

Coordinates: 51.651°N 0.6124°E

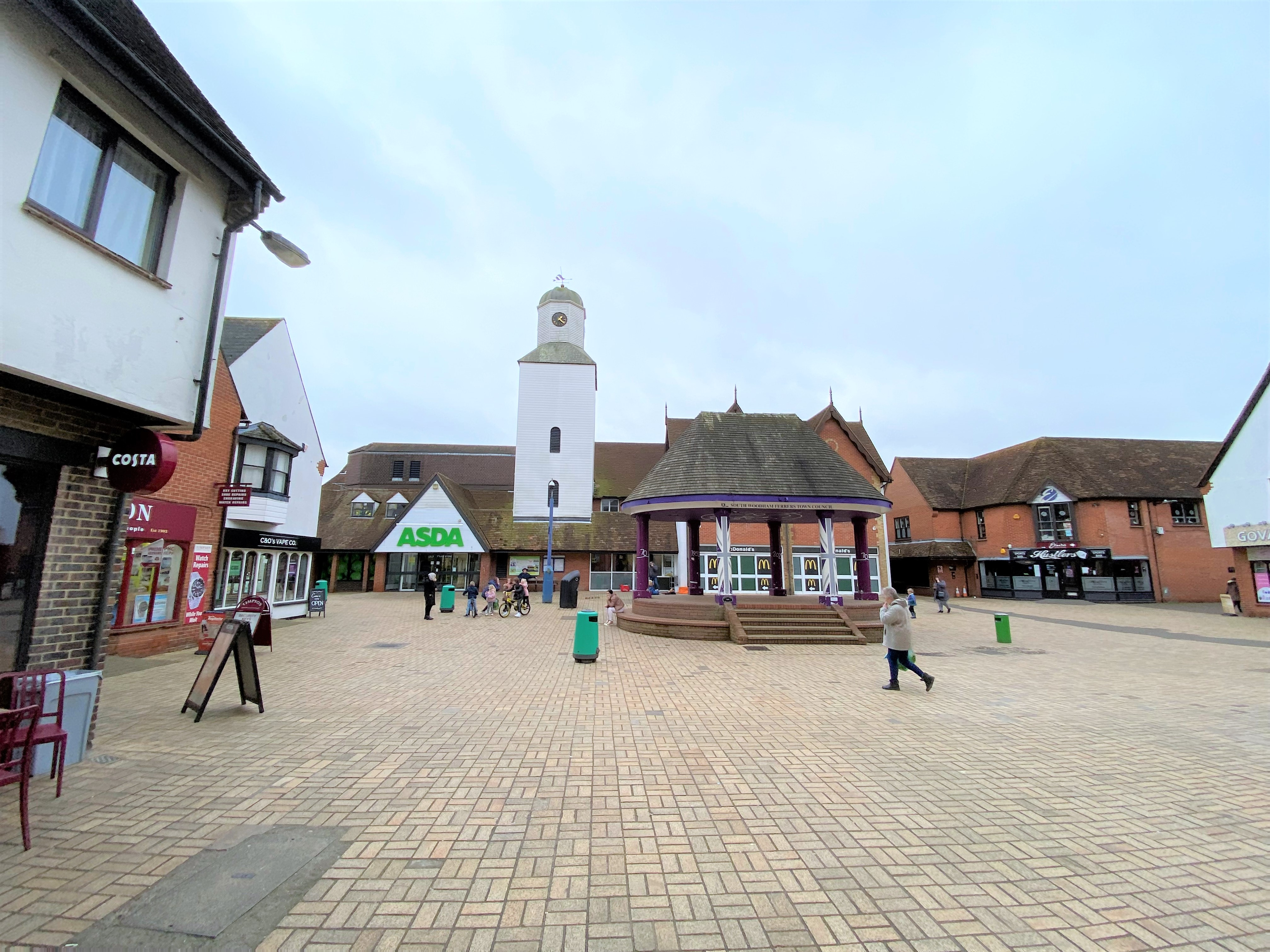
- Queen Elizabeth II Square

- Location within Essex
- Population: 16,026 (Parish, 2021)
- OS grid reference: TQ812970
- District: Chelmsford
- Shire county: Essex
- Region: East
- Country: England
- Sovereign state: United Kingdom
- Post town: CHELMSFORD
- Postcode district: CM3
- Dialling code: 01245
- Police: Essex
- Fire: Essex
- Ambulance: East of England
- UK Parliament: Maldon

South Woodham Ferrers is a town and civil parish in the City of Chelmsford district of Essex, England. It is approximately 35 miles (56 km) east of London and 8 miles (13 km) south-east of Chelmsford. At the 2021 census the parish had a population of 16,026.

The town is situated east of Fenn Creek, near to where it meets the River Crouch. South Woodham Ferrers is part of the Maldon constituency represented by Sir John Whittingdale MP.

== History ==
The area now occupied by South Woodham Ferrers was sparsely populated farmland until the railway station opened in 1889. The station was originally called "Woodham Ferris", having been built to serve the nearby village of Woodham Ferrers, which stands on a hill 1 mile (1.6 km) north of the station. South Woodham Ferrers developed gradually around the station, with some of the farmland being parcelled up into plots for sale to individuals and developers. In 1974 Essex County Council adopted a masterplan to significantly expand South Woodham Ferrers with large housing estates and other facilities, including a new town centre.

The area remained part of the civil parish of Woodham Ferrers until 1 April 1987, when it was made a separate parish.

Many street names in the southwestern part of the town are taken from the works of J. R. R. Tolkien, such as Gandalf's Ride, Gimli Watch, Shirebourn Vale, Rivendell Vale, Celeborn Street, Hobbiton Hill and Arwen Grove.

South Woodham Ferrers has a monthly magazine called 'The South Woodham Focus', established in 2000.

== Town centre ==
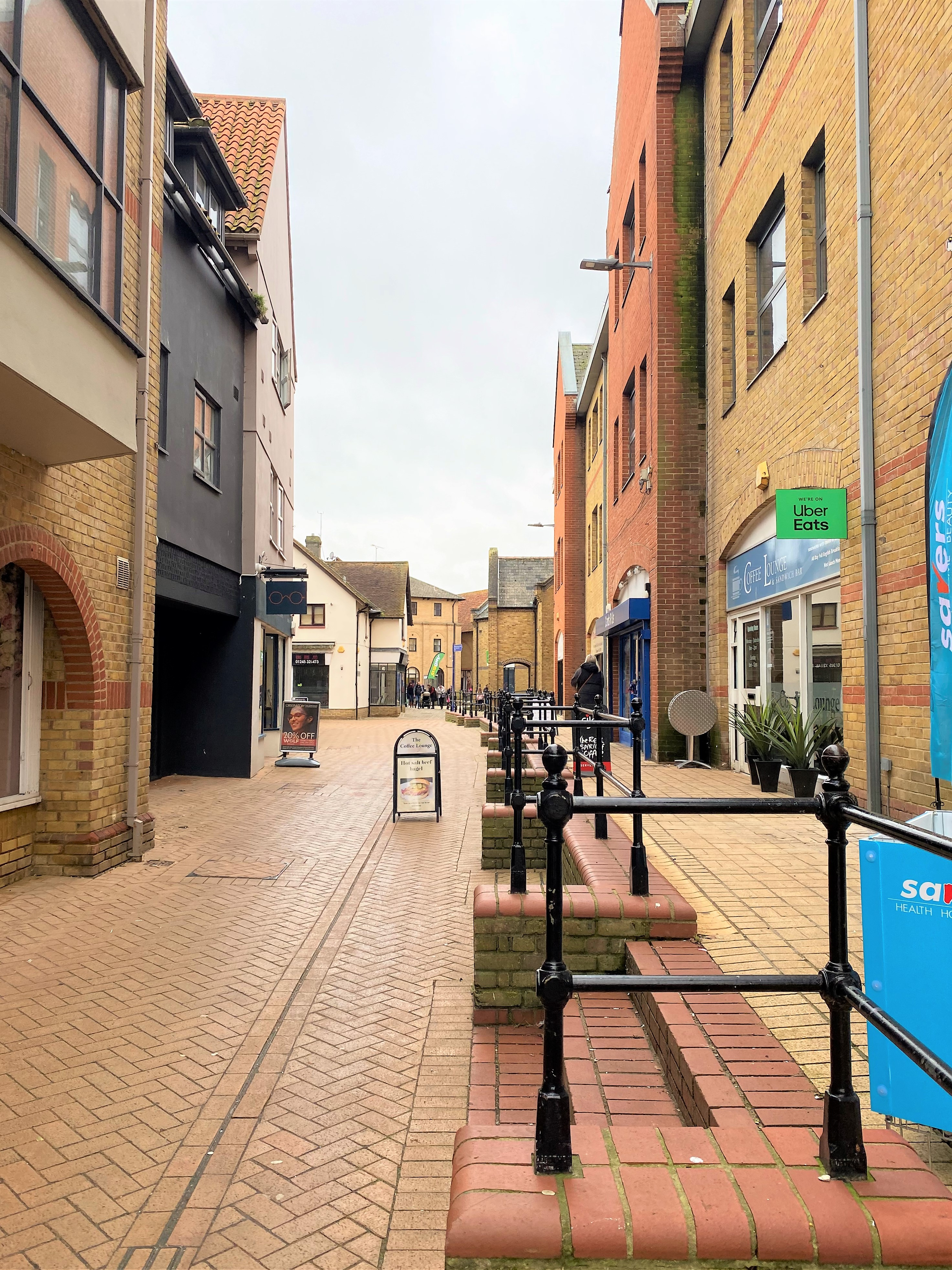
Heralds Way, one of the shopping streets in the pedestrianised town centre.

The town centre has around 100 business units. Approximately 45% are retail premises, with the remainder being a combination of professional services (such as banks and estate agents) and dining locations such as cafés and restaurants.

The supermarket chain Asda opened a store in the town in 1978 which made them the principal retailer in the town. Essex County Council required all new buildings to have "specific Essex characteristics", and so the style of the supermarket was based on buildings in Coggeshall. The design of the supermarket, including its signature clocktower, became a popular style for new supermarkets across the UK.

In 2001 Essex County Council sold the freehold for the majority of the town centre to Asda, who in turn sold a package of land and property to SW Investments. As a result of these sales, Asda owns the town's car parks, Queen Elizabeth II Square and approximately one-third of the shop premises in the town centre. SW Investments owns most of the remaining areas in the town centre, including Market Square, with the remaining premises having a variety of private owners.

In 1981 Queen Elizabeth II opened the town square, which was named after her.

== Schools ==
The main secondary school in the town is William de Ferrers School, the first intake of which was in 1982. The town has five primary schools: Collingwood, Elmwood, St. Josephs RC, Trinity St. Mary's C of E and Woodville. Chetwood Primary School was closed in 2009 and was replaced by a Sure Start centre.

== Bushy Hill ==
Bushy Hill is part of South Woodham Ferrers town council area, and lies to the north of the town. The west face of Bushy Hill was covered in broad leafed woodland and known locally as "Little Wood". "Big Wood", officially named Hawe's Wood and also known as "Bluebell Wood", is closer to Edwin's Hall. Later the hill became known locally as "Radar Hill" due to having been visually dominated by a radar testing site. This site was operated by a number of the former Marconi companies including Alenia Marconi Systems, and more recently used by BAE Systems to develop various radar technologies, some of which are for military use. The site remains in use, but the large dish which earned the hill its nickname has been removed. The permissive footpath around the site passes the entrance sign warning of "helicopters landing, danger of radiation" and other such dangers associated with a working radar testing site. The inner workings of the site are secured with a gatehouse, anti-climb fencing and a number of CCTV cameras.

Bushy Hill was also known locally, before Marconi came to use it, as "Landslip Hill", referring to the south face of the hill which has slid away leaving a bare escarpment, clearly visible from the town.

== Transport ==
=== Road ===
The town is connected by the A132 to the A130, A127 and other main routes. The B1012 goes east to Southminster and Burnham-on-Crouch and the B1418 north to Danbury.

=== Rail ===
South Woodham Ferrers railway station is on the single-track Crouch Valley Line from Wickford to Southminster. The station was originally called "Woodham Ferris", being renamed "Woodham Ferrers" in 1913 before adopting its current name in 2007.

=== Ferry ===
There was a ferry crossing across the River Crouch to Hullbridge and other destinations.

== Media ==
South Woodham Ferrers is within the BBC London and ITV London region. Television signals are received from the Crystal Palace TV transmitter. However, BBC East region is also the default BBC One variant given to South Woodham Ferrers postcodes on Channel 101 through satellite television such as Freesat. Local radio stations are BBC Essex on 95.3 FM, Heart East on 102.6 FM and Radio Essex on 107.7 FM. The town is served by the local community magazine called the Focus, produced Monthly by Point Graphics Ltd, it also has a newspaper, Essex Chronicle.

== Music ==
South Woodham Ferrers has two choirs. The men's choir was originally named after the town and now performs under the name of men2sing. The women's choir is The Swift Singers.

== Governance ==
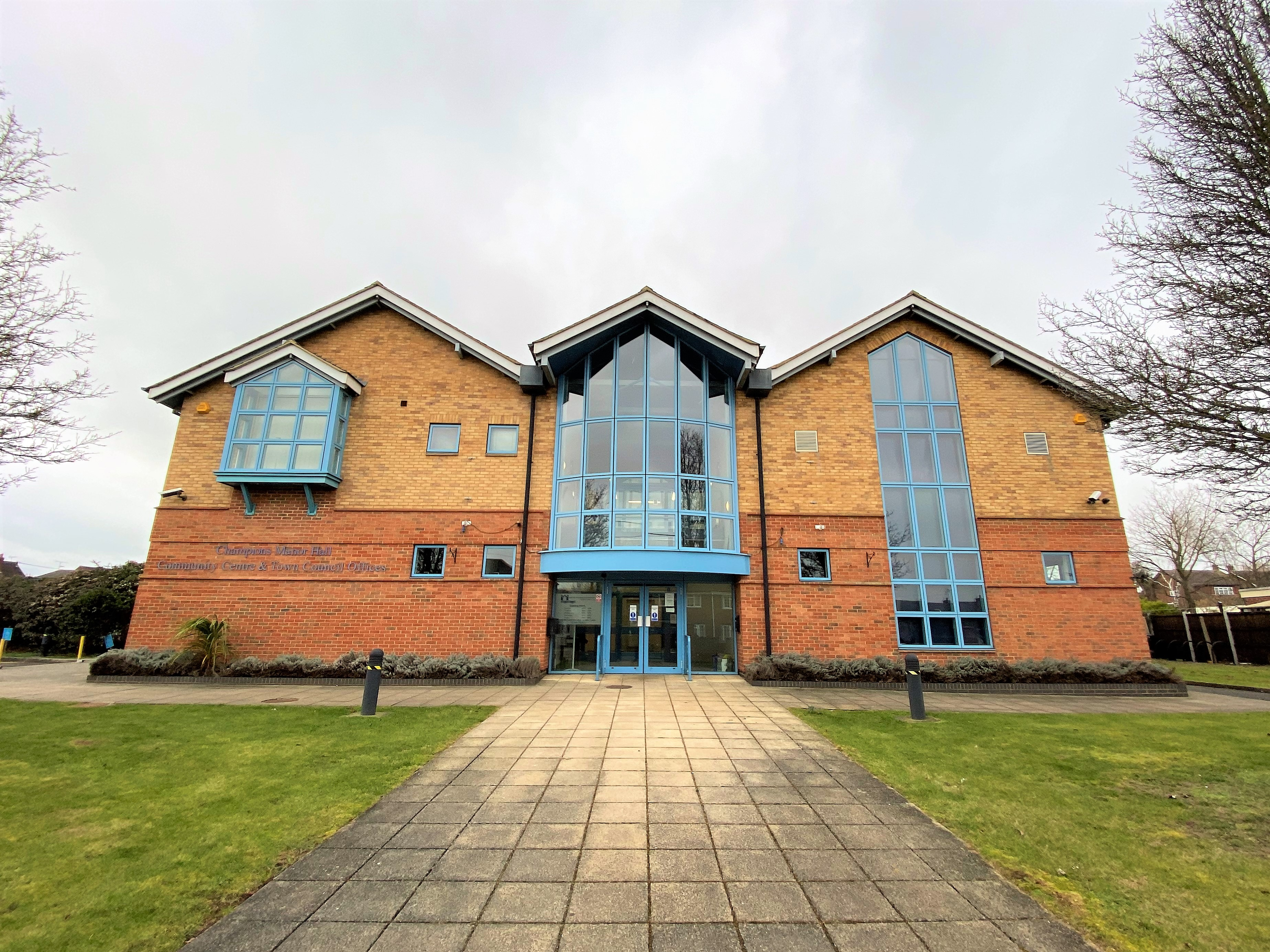
Champions Manor Hall: Community centre and offices of South Woodham Ferrers Town Council.

There are three tiers of local government covering South Woodham Ferrers, being South Woodham Ferrers Town Council at parish level, Chelmsford City Council at district level and Essex County Council at county level. The town council meets and has its offices at Champions Manor Hall on Hullbridge Road, which also serves as a community centre.

In Summer 2006, South Woodham Ferrers elected its first town mayor.

== Demography ==
At the 2021 census, the parish had a population of 16,026. The built up area covers essentially the same area as the parish. The built up area populations published by the Office for National Statistics are rounded to the nearest five people, and the built up area of South Woodham Ferrers was reported to have a population of 16,025.

The population of the parish declined between 2001 and 2021; it had been 16,453 at the 2011 census, and 16,629 at the 2001 census.

== Sport ==
South Woodham Ferrers Rugby Club has a Club House at Saltcoats Park, running teams at ages between under 7 and under 16. The youth section consists of under-17s and colts. There are three senior teams, a veterans' team and a ladies' team.

South Woodham Ferrers Cricket Club runs three teams in the T Rippon Mid-Essex League, playing home games at Purleigh CC and Salcoats Park.

South Woodham Ferrers has several amateur football teams, the largest being South Woodham Ferrers United FC. This is the biggest sports organisation in the town with 40+ teams ranging from 3 yrs up to and including adults' football. Others are William De Ferrers, Woodham Athletic & Woodham Radars.

Team Bentham is a South Woodham Ferrers-based skateboard team, which won the 2019 Essex wide 'Lord of the Swords' competition. It is named after English philosopher, jurist, and social reformer Jeremy Bentham.

== Notable people ==
- Terry Alderton, comedian, actor, and television presenter
- Gordon Southern, comedian
- Jon Morter, campaigner of Rage Against the Machine and The Justice Collective UK Christmas No.1 singles, and radio presenter
- James Harper, professional footballer
- Frank Bruno, professional boxer (used to train in South Woodham Ferrers rather than live according to local group)
