= William Fytche =

Administrator of the British East India Company (1716 – 1753)

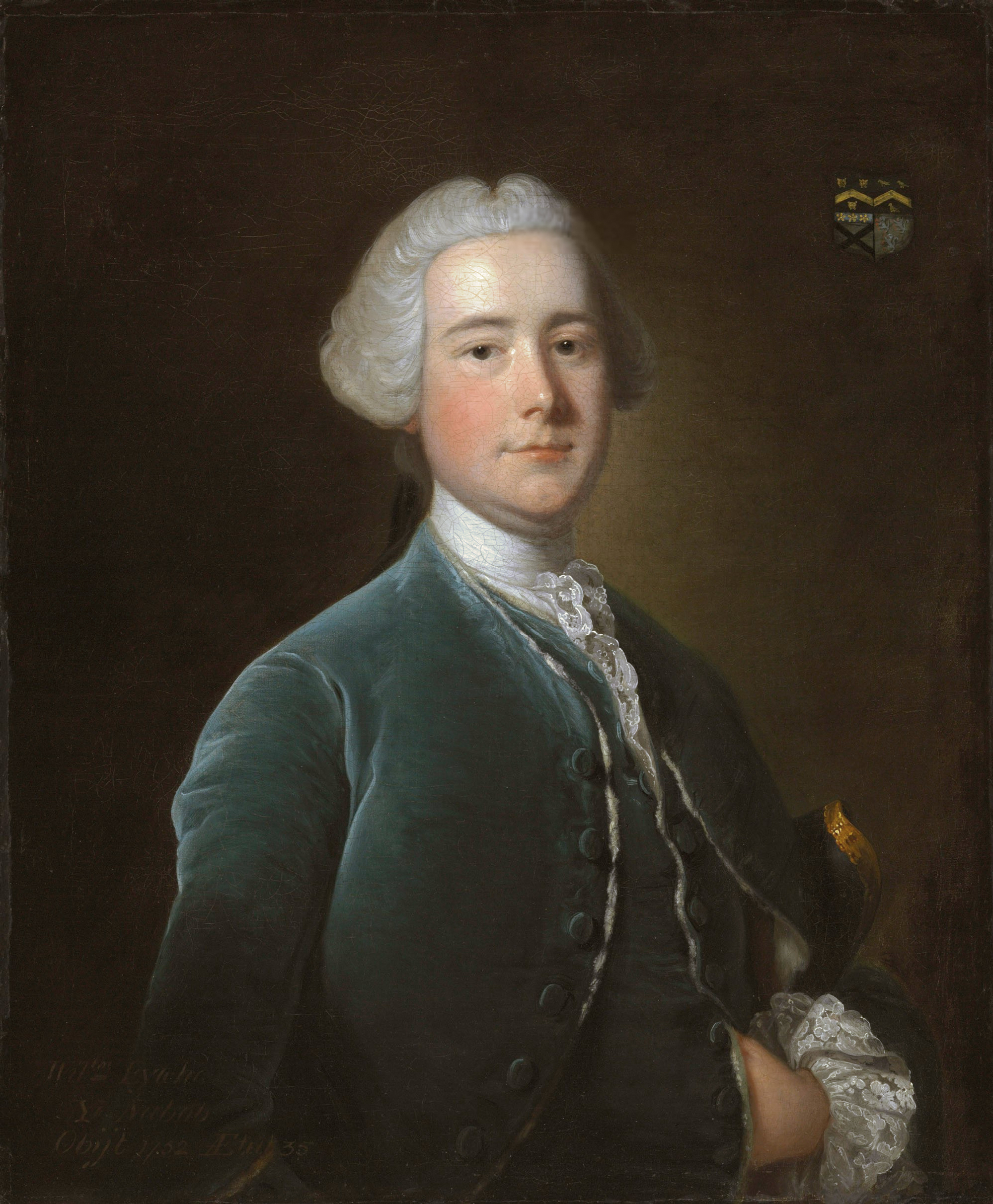
- Portrait by Thomas Hudson (1752)
- Born: 1716
- Died: 10 August 1753 (aged 36–37)
- Occupation: Colonial Administrator
- Known for: President of Bengal

William Fytche (1716 – 10 August 1753) was an administrator of the English East India Company. He served as President of Bengal in the mid-eighteenth century. He was one of the last administrators before the Battle of Plassey allowed the company to firmly establish its rule in India.

== Biography ==
Fytche was the youngest son of William Fytche, Member of Parliament for Maldon, and his wife Mary, daughter of Robert Corey of Danbury. He became a member of the Calcutta council of merchants in 1746. In 1749 he went to Murshidabad, to take charge of the factory at Cossimbazaar there. He became President (Governor) on 8 January 1752. According to the Gentleman's Magazine in 1794, he had been in India for 21 years.

== Family ==
Fytche married Lucia Beard on 25 February 1744 at Fort St George, Madras, where he was before being sent to Bengal. Their daughter Elizabeth was heir also to Fytche's brother Thomas, of Danbury Place, Essex; she married in 1775 Lewis Disney, who then changed his name to Lewis Disney Fytche.

Fytche died of dysentery at the age of 35. After Fytche's death Lucia married William McGuire, having a son and a daughter with him.

Political offices
Preceded by Adam Dawson	President of Bengal; 5 July – 8 August 1752	Succeeded by Roger Drake
