= Hounslow Green =

Hamlet in Uttlesford, Essex, England

Coordinates: 51.839°N 0.401°E

- Location within Essex
- Civil parish: Barnston
- District: Uttlesford
- Shire county: Essex
- Region: East
- Country: England
- Sovereign state: United Kingdom
- Police: Essex
- Fire: Essex
- Ambulance: East of England

Hounslow Green or Onslow Green is a hamlet in the civil parish of Barnston, in the Uttlesford district, in the county of Essex, England. It is on the B1008 road (historically the A130 road), located in between the villages of Barnston and Ford End. Onslow Green has a Nature Reserve with a pond.
