= William Rose (schoolmaster and writer) =

Scottish schoolmaster, writer and classical scholar

Dr William Rose (1719–1786) was a Scottish schoolmaster and classical scholar.

== Life ==
The eldest son of Hugh Rose of Birse, Aberdeenshire, he was educated at Marischal College, Aberdeen. He later served as usher to the Earl of Dunmore at the Northampton Academy of Philip Doddridge. He then moved to Kew, and in 1758 to Chiswick, where he conducted a successful school until his death, 4 July 1786. Though a dissenter and a Scot, Rose was a friend of Samuel Johnson; but Johnson blamed his leniency on corporal punishment, "for," said he, "what the boys gain at one end they lose at the other." Among Rose's pupils was Charles Burney the younger, who married his daughter Sarah. Among his friends was Bishop Lowth, and his executors were Thomas Cadell and William Strahan, the publishers. He also served as one of Andrew Millar's advisers on incoming manuscripts. Rose, Millar and Strahan were all born and educated in Scotland but pursued their careers in London.

== Works ==
Besides editing Robert Dodsley's The Preceptor (2 vols. 1748), he issued a translation of Sallust's Catiline's Conspiracy and Jugurthine War (London, 1757). The work was commended in the Bibliographical Miscellany and other reviews, and a fourth edition was edited by Abraham John Valpy in 1830 in his Family Classical Library. His classical library was sold by T. Payne on 1 March 1787.

Rose also had a share in editing the Monthly Review.

== Family ==
William Rose married Sarah, daughter of Dr. Samuel Clark; Samuel Rose (1767–1804) was their son. Their daughter Anne married Edward Smith Foss, and was mother of Edward Foss.

== Notes ==
Attribution

This article incorporates text from a publication now in the public domain: "Rose, Samuel". Dictionary of National Biography. London: Smith, Elder & Co. 1885–1900.
