= Danbury Place =

Country house in Essex, England, UK

Coordinates: 51°42′56″N 0°33′21″E

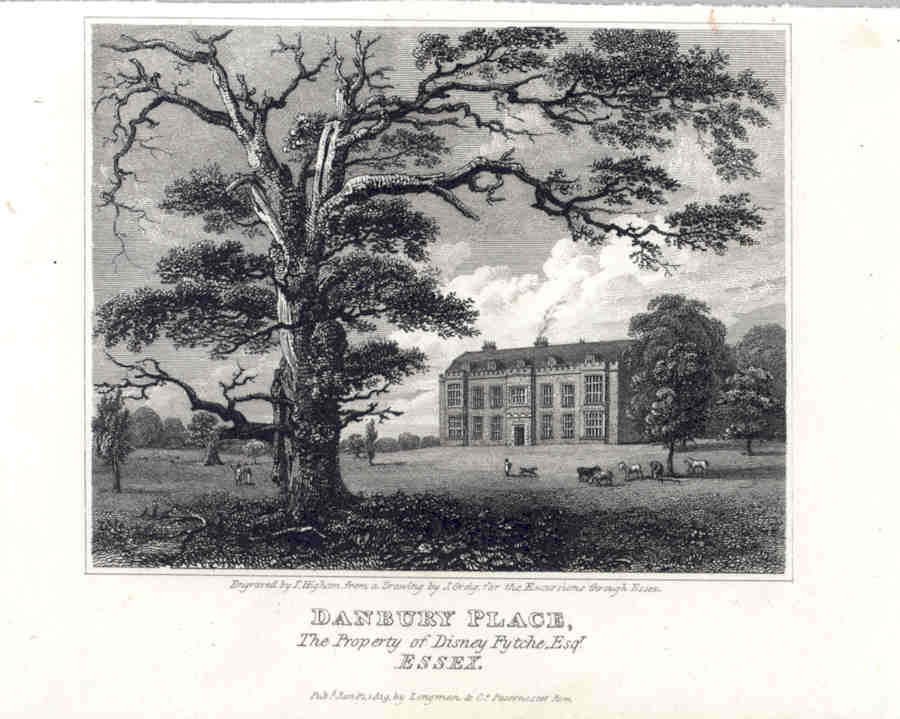
Danbury Place, as depicted in 1818

Danbury Place was an English country house, first built by Sir Walter Mildmay in the time of Elizabeth I, dated to 1589. It is situated on one of the highest points of the county of Essex.

The house was demolished and rebuilt on an adjoining site around 1830, completed as a red brick mansion in 1832. It then became an episcopal palace, as Danbury Palace, in 1845, a use that continued until 1890.

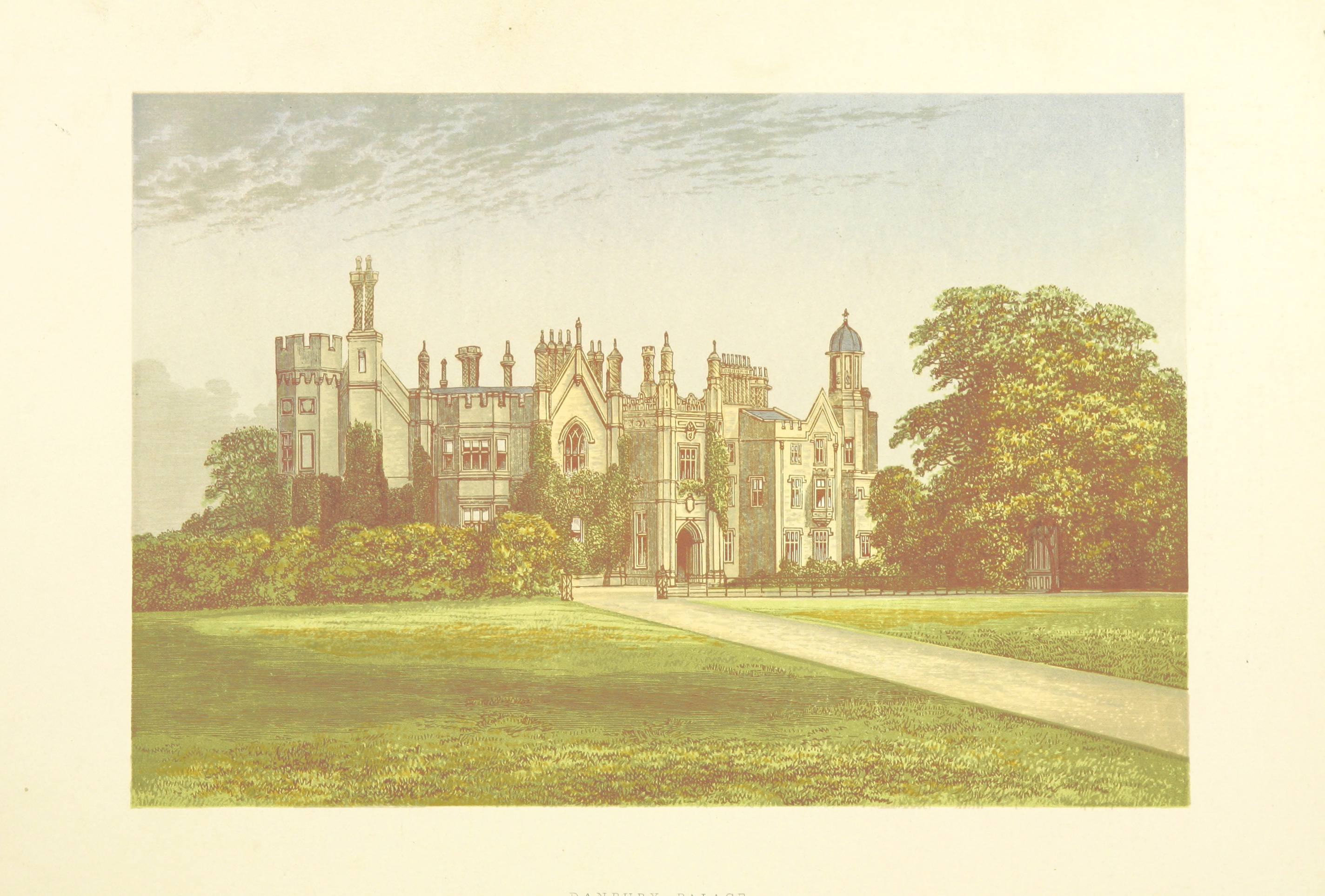
Danbury Palace, formerly Danbury Place, Essex in 1866

== History ==
Danbury Place was in the Mildmay family until 1673, when John Mildmay died childless. His wife Mary then married Robert Cory, Archdeacon of Middlesex. She died in 1724; of the Cory children, only Elizabeth, who married William Fytche, survived to inherit, and Danbury Place passed to the Fytche family.

In the next generation, Danbury Place passed in 1750 to William's younger son Thomas Fytche (1706–1777). He had work done on the house by Isaac Ware, who installed a chimney piece. He died without issue, and the house passed to his niece and adopted daughter Elizabeth, daughter of William Fytche who briefly was Governor of Bengal. In 1775 she had married Lewis Disney, who added Fytche to his name. William Huntington mentioned that he once worked there for "Squire Fitch".

Lewis Disney Fytche had five daughters with his wife, who died in 1787. The eldest (Frances) Elizabeth married Sir William Hillary in 1800, who bought out his father-in-law's interest in the house in 1801, and resided there with his young family. He separated from Elizabeth in 1808, going to the Isle of Man to live while she stayed at Danbury Place, until 1823 when her father died. At the time of her own death in 1828 it was let out; Hillary then sold Danbury Place to John Round.

Round resided at Danbury Place, having replaced the old house with a new one designed by Thomas Hopper (1832), in a Tudor Gothic (neo-Elizabethan) style. After 12 years it became an episcopal palace for the Bishop of Rochester, with a change of name to Danbury Palace.

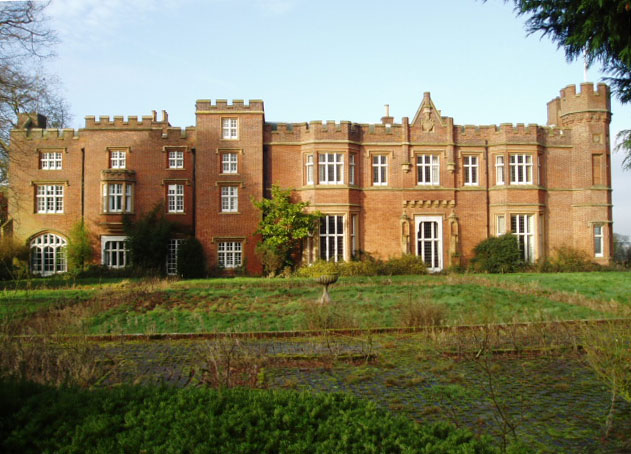
Danbury Palace, Essex, today

Danbury Palace was put up for sale in 1892, with a park of 284 acres. It was sold to Seth Taylor, who sold it on to Hugh Hoare. The house was bought by Brigadier General John Tyson Wigan in 1919 . He sold the house and park in 1946.. Danbury Palace was used as an Emergency Matertinity Hospital from 1939 until 1946. After the War a large part of the park was bought by Essex County Council. The house and outer buildings went to Anglia Polytechnic University in 1974 to create Danbury Country Park. Danbury Place was registered as a Grade II Listed Building in 1987.

After three decades of use as a conference centre, Danbury Palace was sold by Anglia Ruskin University to be converted (as of 2017) into thirteen flats.

== The Park ==
Originally Danbury Place was set in a deer park. The park has now become Danbury Country Park.
