= Danbury Country Park =

Country park in Essex, England

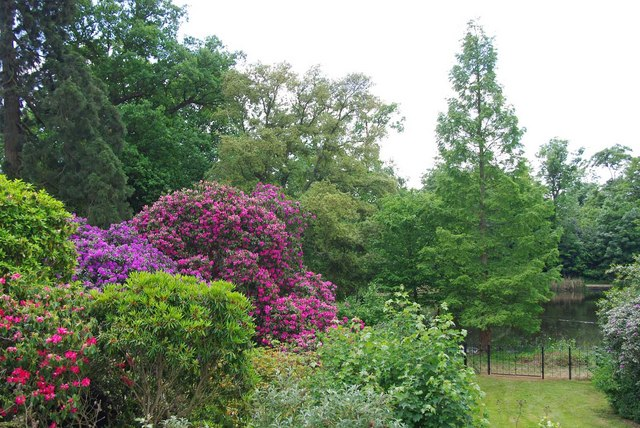
- By the lower lake

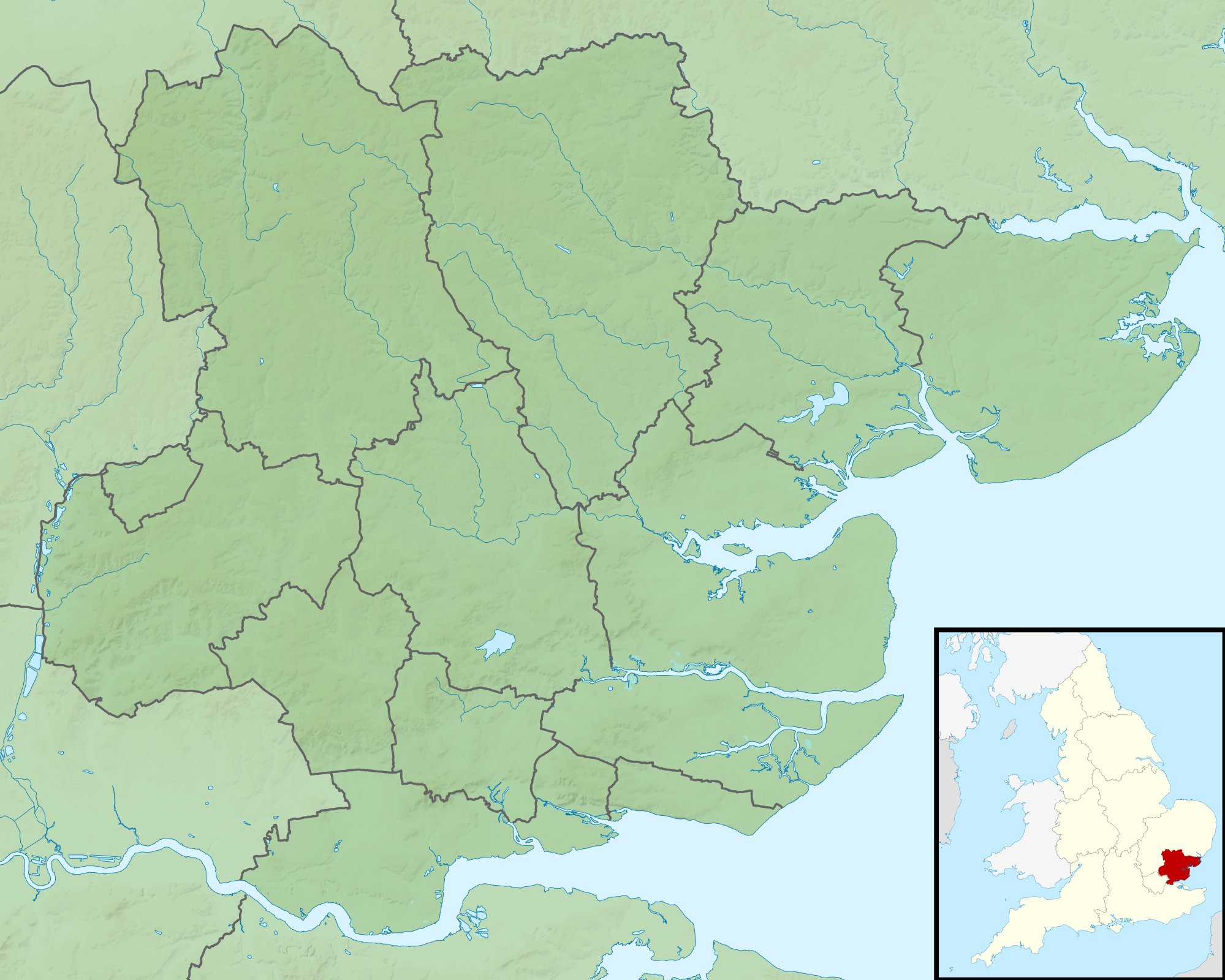
- Location within Essex
- Interactive map of Danbury Country Park
- Location: near Danbury, Essex
- OS grid: TL 770 050
- Coordinates: 51.71527°N 0.55773°E
- Area: 45 acres (18 ha)
- Operator: Essex County Council
- Designation: Grade II
- Website: www.explore-essex.com/places-to-go/find-whats-near-me/danbury-country-park

Danbury Country Park is a country park near Danbury in Essex, England, managed by Essex County Council. It is listed Grade II in Historic England's Register of Parks and Gardens, and it has received the Green Flag Award.

== History ==
The park was originally a medieval deer park. The estate was purchased in 1589 by Walter Mildmay, Chancellor of the Exchequer to Elizabeth I, and Danbury Place was built. In 1758 Thomas Fytche, to whom the estate had passed through family succession, commissioned a map of the estate, which showed avenues of trees, formal gardens and a kitchen garden.

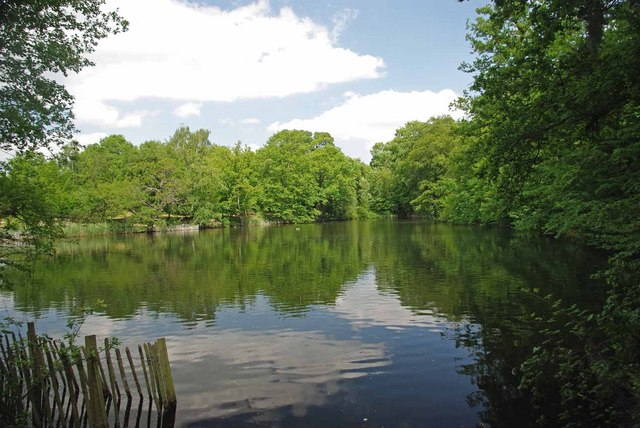
Top lake of Danbury Country Park

The estate was sold in 1830 to John Round; Danbury Place, in a poor state of repair, was demolished and rebuilt. Round sold the estate in 1845 to the Ecclesiastical Commissioners, the owners until 1892; formal gardens were laid out and the house was renamed Danbury Palace. (It is now Grade II listed.) After several changes of ownership, the estate was purchased in 1947 by Essex County Council, and it became the base of the Mid Essex Technical College. In 1974 the house and associated buildings became part of Anglia Polytechnic University, and the south-eastern area, including three lakes, was designated a Country Park.

== Description ==
The park covers 45 acres (18 ha). The three lakes, in the wooded area to the south, are thought to date from the period of the medieval deer park. There are paths around the lakes and across the park, with many seating areas. There is a wildflower meadow and a formal lawn garden. Fishing on the lower lake is allowed with a fishing permit, at certain times.
