= William Barwell =

British businessman (1709-1769)

- Born: 1709
- Died: 1769 (aged 59–60)
- Occupation: Colonial administrator
- Known for: President of Bengal

William Barwell (1709–1769) was an administrator of the English East India Company.

== Life ==
He was the son of William Barwell of Enfield, Middlesex, a London merchant. He was appointed a writer with the East India Company in 1721 and posted to Bengal. Promoted in 1743 to the chiefship of Patna, he then served as President of Bengal from 1748 to 1749, in post for 14 months. He was dismissed in 1750 after being found guilty of misdemeanours at Patna, and returned to England.

In 1751, Barwell bought the Abbey House at Chertsey, in Surrey. He was elected as a director of the East India Company between 1753 and 1766, excepting 1757, 1760, and 1765. He was appointed High Sheriff of Surrey for 1768.

Barwell died in 1769 and was buried at Chertsey church.

== Family ==
Barwell married three times; firstly to Elizabeth Eyre, secondly to Mary Anne Atkinson and thirdly to Elizabeth Pierce. His second son by his third wife was Richard Barwell, born in Calcutta, who became a rich nabob and member of parliament. The Abbey House was left to his son Roger, and stayed in the family to 1809. His daughter Mary Barwell (born 1733) was a financier.

Political offices
Preceded by John Forster	President of Bengal; 18 April 1748 – 17 June 1749	Succeeded by Adam Dawson
