= Edmund Probyn =

British judge

Sir Edmund Probyn (1678 — 17 May 1742) was a British judge.

Born to William Probyn and his wife Elizabeth, Probyn was baptised on 16 July 1678, and is next recorded as having matriculated at Christ Church, Oxford on 23 April 1695, joining the Middle Temple on 27 November. He was called to the Bar on 15 May 1702, and in 1720 married Elizabeth Blencowe, daughter of Sir John Blencowe.

After 20 years of "the usual forensic drudgery", Probyn secured appointment as a justice of the Brecon, Glamorgan, and Radnor circuit court in 1721, and became a Serjeant-at-Law on 27 January 1724, defending Thomas Parker, 1st Earl of Macclesfield at his trial for embezzlement. On 3 November 1726 he became a Justice of the King's Bench, succeeding Sir Littleton Powys, and on 24 November 1740 became Chief Baron of the Exchequer, succeeding Sir John Comyns.

After his death on 17 May 1742, Probyn's estate was left to his nephew, John Hopkins, on the condition that he took the last name Probyn. This he did, and later sat as a Member of Parliament for Wootton Bassett.

== Bibliography ==
- Foss, Edward (1870). A Biographical Dictionary of the Justices of England (1066 - 1870). Spottiswoode and Company. OCLC 181068114.
- Sainty, John (1993). The Judges of England 1272 -1990: a list of judges of the superior courts. Oxford: Selden Society. OCLC 29670782.

Legal offices
Preceded by Sir John Comyns	Chief Baron of the Exchequer; 1740–1742	Succeeded by Sir Thomas Parker
