= Henry Parsons (English politician) =

British politician (1687–1739)

Henry Parsons (24 July 1687 – 29 December 1739), of Wickham Bishops, near Maldon, Essex, was an English politician who sat in the House of Commons of Great Britain from 1724 to 1739.

Parsons was the third son of Sir John Parsons MP (died 1717) of Reigate, and the first by his second wife. He became a London merchant. His half-brother Humphry Parsons was also an MP.

Parsons was appointed by his friend, Walpole, to be master baker, known as the purveyor, at Chelsea Hospital. It was an unofficial position said to be worth £500 p.a. In 1717 he was heavily in debt, having borrowed £4,000 from his father as his share of his family's estate, as well as owing several large sums. At the 1722 general election he unsuccessfully contested the borough of Maldon in Essex, but was returned at a by-election on 25 February 1724 as Member of Parliament for the rotten borough of Lostwithiel in Cornwall. He resigned that seat in 1727, when he was appointed Commissioner of the victualling office, and at the 1727 general election he was returned as MP for Maldon. He was re-elected in 1734, and held the seat until his death on 29 December 1739, aged 52.

Parliament of Great Britain
| Preceded by Lord Stanhope; Marquess of Hartington | Member of Parliament for Lostwithiel; 1724–1727; With: Sir Orlando Bridgeman, Bt | Succeeded by Sir Orlando Bridgeman, Bt; Sir William Stanhope |
| Preceded by Sir John Comyns; Thomas Bramston I | Member of Parliament for Maldon; 1727–1739; With: Thomas Bramston II 1727–34; Martin Bladen from 1734 | Succeeded by Martin Bladen; Benjamin Keene |
