= Samuel Rose (barrister) =

English barrister and literary editor

Samuel Rose (1767–1804) was an English barrister and literary editor, now remembered as the friend of William Cowper, the poet.

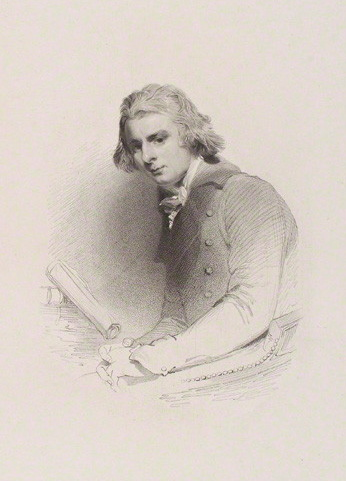
Samuel Rose, 1836 engraving by John Henry Robinson, after Sir Thomas Lawrence and W. Harvey.

== Life ==
He was born at Chiswick, Middlesex, on 20 June 1767, the second and only surviving son of Dr. William Rose (1719–1786).

Samuel was educated for a time at his father's school, and from 1784 to January 1787 at Glasgow University, living in the house of Dr. William Richardson, and gaining several prizes. He also attended the courts of law at Edinburgh, and was on friendly terms there with Adam Smith and Henry Mackenzie. On 6 November 1786 he entered Lincoln's Inn, and, after reading with Serjeant Praed from 1787 to 1790, was called to the bar in 1796. He went the home circuit, attended the Sussex sessions, was ‘encouragingly noticed’ by Lord Kenyon, and appointed counsel to Prince Edward, Duke of Kent and Strathearn.

Rose was delicate from early life, and suffered from tuberculosis. He was engaged by William Hayley to defend William Blake at the quarter sessions at Chichester, from the charge of high treason brought against him by two soldiers. On 11 January 1804, Rose in court suffered a seizure. The defence was successful, but he never recovered from the attack.

He died of consumption at his residence in Chancery Lane, London, on 20 December 1804, and was buried in the church of St Andrew, Holborn; some lines were written on him by Hayley.

== Friend of Cowper ==
In 1787, when travelling from Glasgow to London, Rose went a few miles out of his way to call on William Cowper, at Weston Underwood, Buckinghamshire. The main object of the visit was to convey to the poet the thanks of some of the Scottish professors for the two volumes which he had published. He developed a strong relationship with Cowper, and many letters passed between them.

Rose was with Cowper in August 1788, when he transcribed for the poet his version of the twelfth book of the Iliad, and paid him subsequent visits, the last being in March and April 1800. He found many subscribers to Cowper's Homer, and in October 1793 he took Sir Thomas Lawrence to Weston Underwood, to paint the poet's portrait. The royal pension of £300 per annum to Cowper was made payable to Rose, as his trustee, and George Canning in 1820 called him "Cowper's best friend".

== Works ==
The miscellaneous works of Oliver Goldsmith were collected by Rose and published in 1801, 1806, 1812, and 1820 in four volumes. The memoir prefixed was compiled under the direction of Thomas Percy, but additions were made to it by Rose and others; Percy subsequently made resentful accusations against Rose.

Rose edited in 1792 an edition of the Reports of Cases by Sir John Comyns, and in 1800 Sir John Comyns's work Digest of the Laws of England, in six volumes, of which the first was dedicated to Lord Thurlow. He contributed to the Monthly Review, mainly on legal subjects, and is said to have assisted Lord Sheffield in editing Edward Gibbon's minor works.

== Family ==
He married, at Bath, on 3 August 1790, Sarah, elder daughter of William Farr, M.D., a fellow student of Goldsmith. She survived him with four sons. Cowper Rose, R.E., the second child and the poet's godson, for whose benefit Hayley published in 1808 Cowper's translations of the ‘Latin and Italian Poems of Milton,’ was the author of ‘Four Years in South Africa,’ 1829,. The youngest son, George Edward Rose, born in 1799, was English professor at the Polish college of Krzemieniec, on the borders of Ukraine, from 1821 until his retirement was compelled by the persecution of the Russian officials in 1824; he translated the letters of John Sobieski to his queen during the battle of Vienna by the Turks in 1683, and made researches for a history of Poland. He died at Odessa on 22 October 1825.
