= John Comyns =

English judge and Member of Parliament

Sir John Comyns (c. 1667 – 1 November 1740), of Writtle in Essex, was an English judge and Member of Parliament.

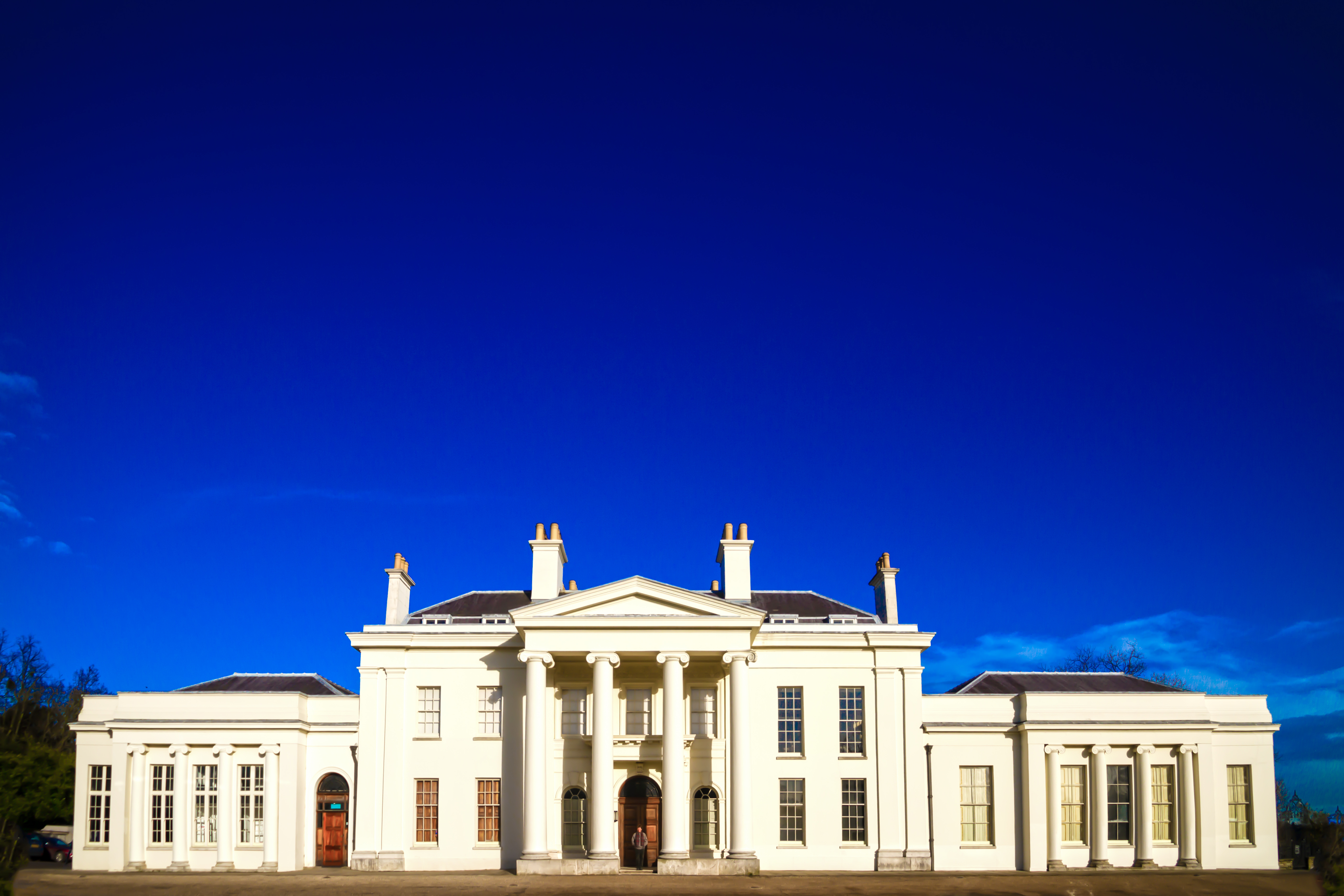
Hylands House, Writtle, near Chelmsford

== Early life ==
He was born the eldest surviving son of William Comyns, barrister, of Lincoln's Inn and his wife Elizabeth, the daughter and coheiress of Matthew Rudd of Little Baddow, Essex. He was educated at Felsted School and Queens' College, Cambridge.

== Career ==
Comyns was a member of Lincoln's Inn, and was called to the bar in 1690. He entered Parliament in 1701 as member for Maldon, and represented that borough for 17 of the next 26 years (1701–08, 1710–15 and 1722–26).

On the three separate occasions on which he was returned for Maldon, his opponents petitioned against his election, alleging bribery or improper conduct by the bailiff (who was the returning officer for the borough); but their only success was in 1715 when they also accused him of having refused to take the Qualification Oath, and his election, in that case, was declared void on those grounds.

He was made serjeant-at-law in 1705, and was appointed a Baron of the Exchequer and knighted in 1726, a Justice of Common Pleas in 1736 and Chief Baron of the Exchequer in 1738.

== Works ==
Comyns is the author of Reports of Cases adjudged in the Courts of King's Bench, Common Pleas, and Exchequer. This work was written in law French. The Reports were translated by the judge's nephew J. Comyns of the Inner Temple, and published in one volume in 1744, with the sanction and approbation of the judges. They were re-edited in 1792 by Samuel Rose. He is also the author of A Digest of the Laws of England. This work too was written in law French, and afterwards translated.

== Hylands House ==
Around 1726, Sir John Comyns purchased the manor of Shaxstones in Writtle, and commissioned the construction of a new family home on the estate, suitable for a man of his standing.

Completed in 1730, Hylands House was an elegant two-storey red brick building in Queen Anne style architecture. The grounds were set out in the formal geometric style fashionable at the time, with a pleasure garden and small kitchen garden to the north of the house. It is now a Grade II* listed building.

== Family ==
He married three times; firstly Anne, daughter and coheiress of Dr Nathaniel Gurdon, rector of Chelmsford, secondly Elizabeth Courthorpe of Kent and thirdly Anne Wilbraham. He left no children. Hylands passed to a nephew, also John Comyns, after the death of his widow.

== See also ==
- William Chaloner

== Notes ==
Legal offices
Preceded by Sir James Reynolds, junior	Chief Baron of the Exchequer; 1738–1740	Succeeded by Sir Edmund Probyn
Parliament of England
Preceded by William Fytche; Irby Montagu	Member of Parliament for Maldon; 1701–1707; With: William Fytche	Succeeded by Parliament of Great Britain
Parliament of Great Britain
Preceded by Sir Richard Child, Bt; Thomas Richmond	Member of Parliament for Maldon; 1710–1715; With: Thomas Richmond 1710–1711; William Fytche 1711–1712; Thomas Bramston 1712–1715	Succeeded by Thomas Bramston; Samuel Tufnell
Preceded by Thomas Bramston; Samuel Tufnell	Member of Parliament for Maldon; 1722–1727; With: Thomas Bramston	Succeeded by Thomas Bramston; Henry Parsons
