= A132 road (England) =

Road in England

Coordinates: 51.61907°N 0.52949°E

A132

Route information
- Length: 9 mi (14 km)

Major junctions
- North end: South Woodham Ferrers
- A130 A127; A13
- South end: Pitsea

Location
- Country: United Kingdom
- Constituent country: England
- Primary destinations: Basildon, Wickford, South Woodham Ferrers

Road network
- Roads in the United Kingdom; Motorways; A and B road zones

The A132 road is a road in England connecting Pitsea and South Woodham Ferrers.

== Route description ==
The A132 starts from a roundabout next to the A13 in Pitsea. From there, the route heads towards Basildon. After going through Basildon, the route heads northwards to an interchange with the A127. From the interchange, the route heads north-eastwards through Wickford to a partial cloverleaf interchange with the A130. The interchange includes two adjacent roundabouts, the northern one named Rettendon Turnpike and the southern one Hawk Hill roundabout. From there, the A132 continues to head north-eastwards to a roundabout in South Woodham Ferrers.
