= Hound Green =

Village in Hampshire, England

Coordinates: 51.326610°N 0.95305°W

- Location within Hampshire
- OS grid reference: SU7304559132
- District: Hart
- Shire county: Hampshire
- Region: South East
- Country: England
- Sovereign state: United Kingdom
- Post town: HOOK
- Postcode district: RG27
- Police: Hampshire and Isle of Wight
- Fire: Hampshire and Isle of Wight
- Ambulance: South Central
- UK Parliament: North East Hampshire

Hound Green is a village in the Hart District of Hampshire, England. It is in the civil parish of Mattingley. Its nearest town is Hook approximately 3 miles (5 km) south-west to the village.
