= Adam Dawson (colonial administrator) =

English colonial administrator (1700–1776)

- Occupation: Colonial Administrator
- Known for: President of Bengal

Adam Dawson was an administrator of the English East India Company. He arrived in Calcutta in 1726. He was a warehouse-keeper in 1748, before he was promoted to president and Governor of Bengal on 17 July 1749, succeeding William Barwell. He was replaced on 5 July 1752 by William Fytche.

Political offices
Preceded by William Barwell	President of Bengal; 17 July 1749 – 5 July 1752	Succeeded by William Fytche
