= A130 road =

Road in Essex, England

Coordinates: 51.69304°N 0.52086°E

A130

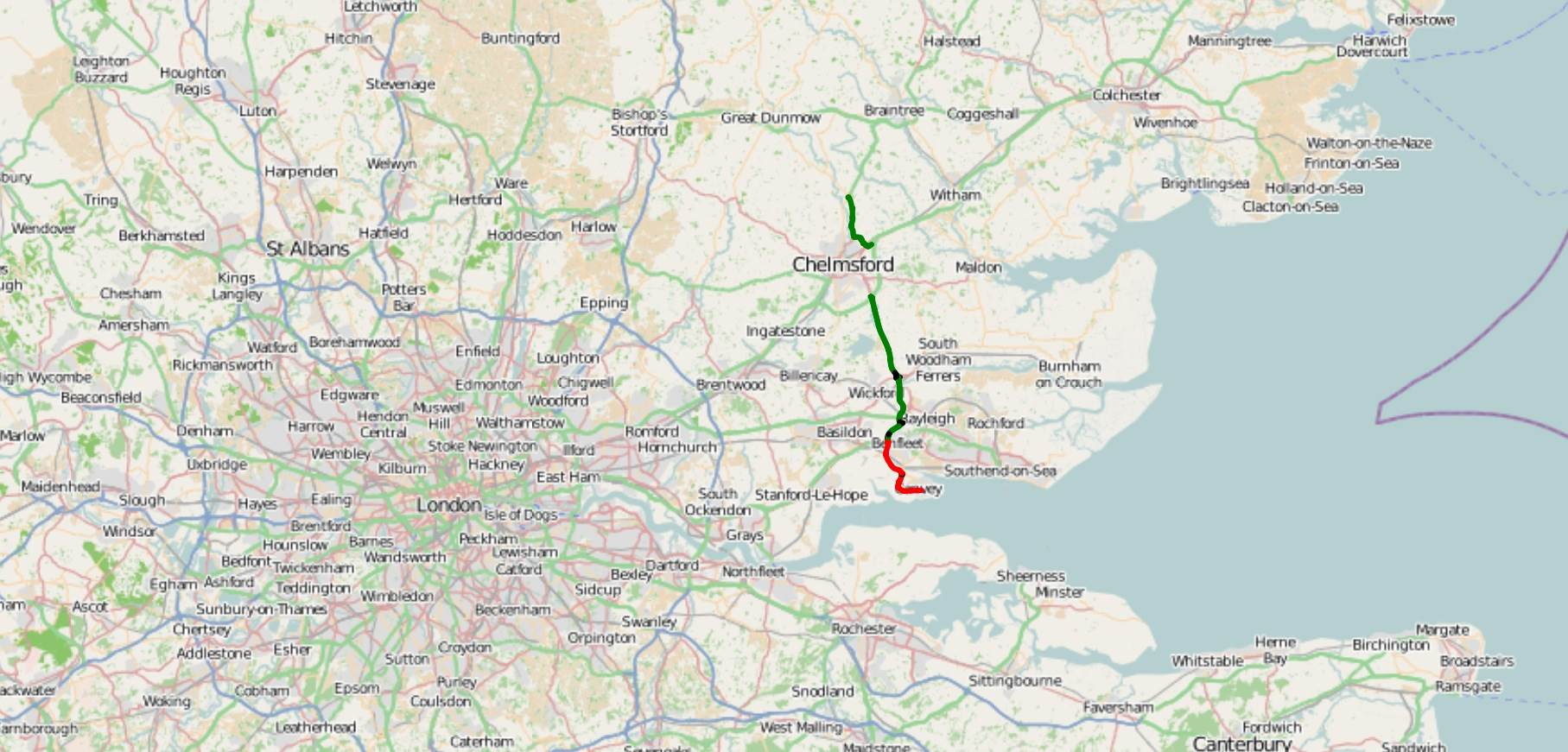
- Click map to enlarge

Route information
- Length: 17.4 mi (28.0 km)

Major junctions
- North end: Howe Green
- A12 A1114 A132 A1245 A127; A13
- South end: Canvey Island

Location
- Country: United Kingdom
- Primary destinations: Chelmsford, South Woodham Ferrers, Basildon, Southend-on-Sea, Canvey Island

Road network
- Roads in the United Kingdom; Motorways; A and B road zones

The A130 is a major road in England linking Howe Green, near Chelmsford, the county town of Essex, with Canvey Island in the south of that county. It is a primary route for some of its length, only losing that status south of the A13 junction at Sadlers Farm roundabout as it nears its terminus on Canvey Island. It was originally a much longer cross-country route (see History).

== Route ==
The present route can be divided into two sections. The road now starts near the village of Howe Green (to the south of Chelmsford) at the Howe Green interchange J17 on the A12. The A130 road heads south away from the Chelmsford area as a new dual carriageway opened in 2002. This is a "secret motorway" complete with hard shoulders, but classified as an A-road. It extends for 6 miles (9.7 km) as far as a junction with the A132 near Wickford, whilst a slightly newer section south of there continues the route as a standard dual carriageway as far as a junction with a spur connecting to the old road (now A1245) and the A127 Southend Arterial Road a few miles west of Southend-on-Sea.

The new road here more or less follows the same path as the World War II GHQ Line hence the many pillboxes visible alongside the carriageway between the Howe Green and the A132 junctions. An older section of dual carriageway extends as far south as the A13 at the Sadlers Hall Farm (Sadlers Farm), a roundabout near Benfleet. As with the A13 from London, the primary route section of the A130 ends here too.

South of the Sadlers Farm roundabout, the final leg of the A130 continues as a non-primary single-carriageway route into Canvey Island on the River Thames. Canvey Way is a causeway connecting "mainland" with island, and connects with the older road through the island, the B1014. On the island itself, a final short stretch of dual carriageway leads to the built-up area where the road turns east and becomes single, before meeting the B1014 again at a one-way system in the central area, incorporating the High Street.

== History ==
The A130 was a much longer route. It originally started on the old A10 just south of Cambridge at Trumpington, and ended on the A127 near Rayleigh (Fairglen interchange). North of Fairglen, and prior to its renumbering as A1245, there was a roadside sign 'A130 Cambridge 53' [miles]. When the M11 Cambridge Western Bypass section was built in the early 1980s, the A10 through Cambridge was reclassified as A1309, whilst the A130 was truncated as far south as Great Dunmow on the A120, due east of London Stansted Airport. The section between Trumpington and Stump Cross (M11 junction 9A, the A11 spur) became A1301, whilst the section between there and Great Dunmow became an extension of the B184. The A11 was also reclassified to minor A-roads and B-roads at this time (qv.). In early 2008, the section between Great Dunmow and Little Waltham was declassified to become an extension of the B1008, itself a product of earlier re-routing.

During the mid-1980s, the A12 Chelmsford Bypass opened and this led to the A130 multiplexing with the former for a few miles to the north and east of Chelmsford. In more recent times, a new road between the village of Howe Green and the Chelmsford suburb of Springfield, Essex Regiment Way, directed traffic away from the northern suburbs. The original A130 through the villages north of Chelmsford and the town itself followed what is now an unclassified road, then B1008 (now extended to include the northern section of Essex Regiment Way), a short section of A1016, and then A1060 and A1114 to the southeast, the latter two forming sections of the same dual carriageway, incorporating a tidal flow flyover (demolished 2020) at Army & Navy Roundabout.

At the southern end, the route was extended as far as the A13 by the 1970s, and then onto Canvey Island via the Canvey Way causeway, when this was constructed in about 1974 it was numbered A1301. The partially dual carriageway section between Chelmsford and the A127 was replaced by a new road (much of it "secret motorway") in 2002–3. The older road is now unclassified through the village of Rettendon (formerly a notorious accident blackspot), and then A1245 between the A132 and A127 junctions.

In early summer 2016, work was undertaken on the stretch between Rettendon and Howe Green (in both directions) to turn the existing hard shoulders into 3rd lanes, as the traffic volume had reached 50,000 vehicles per day. The resurfacing and re-marking of the hard shoulders needed to turn them into 3rd lanes was completed, but problems were then discovered in the crash barriers and subsequently the strength of the embankments supporting the road. The new lanes were then coned off, and the road left at 2 lanes in each direction with no hard shoulder. As of 18 April 2018, the southbound lane has been fully re-opened whilst work continues on the northbound side.

== A130 bridge names ==
When the new A130 road (A127 to A12) was being built in c. 1999-2003, all the under and over-bridges were given names associated with local landmarks and features. The 15 named bridges are listed below. 'Under' refers to a crossing that passes under the A130, and 'over' to one passing over the A130.

Bridges on the A130 between the A127 and A12
Name	Coordinates	Crossing	Over / Under	Remarks
Annwood Bridge	51°35'17"N 0°33'33"E	A127 Southend Arterial Road	Under	Named after Annwood Lodge
Monument Bridge	51°35'33”N 0°33'39"E	Railway (Shenfield to Southend line)	Under	Monument to two airmen killed in March 1918
Rawreth Barn Bridge	51°35'55"N 0°33'55"E	Doubblegate Lane	Over	Named after a farm
Ivydene Bridge	51°36'20"N 0°33'36"E	A129 Southend Road	Under	Named after Ivydene Nursery
Mayrose Bridge	51°37'02"N 0°33'35"E	River Crouch (tidal water course)	Under	Named after Mayrose House
Ashdale Bridge	51°37'19"N 0°33'32"E	Railway (Wickford to Southminster llne)	Under	Named after Ashdale House
Turnpike Bridge	51°37'39”N 0°33'26"E	A132 Rettendon Turnpike	Over	Rettendon Turnpike
Curry Hill Footbridge	51°38'05"N 0°32'56"E	Footpath	Over	Local footpath
Hoe Bridge	51°38'39"N 0°32'44"E	Hoe Lane	Under	
Laceys Bridge	51°39'13"N 0°32'33"E	South Hanningfield Road	Under	Named after Laceys Farm
Canon Barns Bridge	51°40'00"N 0°32'00"E	Canon Barns Road	Over	Named after Canon Barns farm
Exchange Bridge	51°40'25"N 0°31'44”E	Church Lane	Over	Telephone exchange; Openreach Learning & Development Training Centre.
St Peter's Way Footbridge	51°40'37"N 0°31'38"E	Footpath	Over	Long-distance footpath (Ongar to Bradwell)
Downhouse Bridge	51°41'07"N 0°31'26"E	Private Road	Over	To Hanningfield water treatment works
Sir Hughes Bridge	51°41'27"N 0°31'18"E	Sandon Brook (water course)	Under	Named after properties Great Sir Hughes and Little Sir Hughes
