= Thomas Bramston (died 1765) =

British Member of Parliament

Thomas Bramston (c. 1690–1765), of Skreens, near Maldon, Essex, was a British lawyer and Tory politician who sat in the House of Commons from 1727 to 1747.

Bramston was the eldest surviving son of Antony Bramston of Skreens and his wife Catherine Nutt, daughter. of Sir Thomas Nutt of Mays, Sussex. and the grandson of Sir John Bramston, former MP for Essex and Maldon. He was admitted at Middle Temple in 1707 and at Pembroke College, Cambridge on 11 October 1707. In 1714 he was called to the bar. On succeeding his father to Skreens in 1722, he also became High steward of Maldon. He married Diana Ferne widow of Robert Ferne of Locke, Derbyshire and daughter of Edward Turner of Stoke, Lincolnshire. Diana died on 10 January 1726 and he married as his second wife Elizabeth Berney, daughter of Richard Berney, recorder of Norwich, in January 1733

At the 1727 British general election, Bramston was returned unopposed as Member of Parliament for Maldon replacing Thomas Bramston of Writtle with whom his political career has sometimes been conflated. Bramston made his first recorded speech opposing the Address on 7 May 1728 and again opposed the Address on 21 January 1729. On 26 January 1730, he seconded a motion calling for information as to any engagements entered into for the hire of foreign troops. On 11 March 1730, he moved for ‘an address to the King for a particular account of the £60,000 granted last year for to make good the engagements with foreign princes’, but Walpole avoided the question through parliamentary procedure. Also in 1730 he carried a bill which resulted in the Insolvent Debtors Relief Act 1729 (3 Geo. 3. c. 27), an act of Parliament granting the release of about 10,000 insolvent debtors. He supported a place bill on 17 February 1731.

In 1732 Bramston was responsible for an act of Parliament, the Justices Qualification Act 1731 (5 Geo. 2. c. 18), requiring a land qualification for justices of the peace, after complaints that several JPs had no fortunes, and some were not able to write or read. In 1733 he carried a motion to change the process for repairing high roads to one that was fairer for the labourers but the bill which he introduced was lost on its third reading. In a debate on the Excise Bill in 1733 he gave described several oppressive acts which to his knowledge the officers of the excise had been guilty of in his neighbourhood. At the 1734 British general election he was defeated at Maldon, but was returned in a contest as MP for Essex. He spoke against the practice of forcing householders and innkeepers to maintain the soldiers quartered on them. He was returned unopposed as MP for Essex at the 1741 British general election. When the Jacobites in France were preparing for an invasion in February 1744, Bramston was described to the French Government as a 'gentilhomme d'un grand crédit dans la province d'Essex où les troupes doivent débarquer', and he was expected to have led a rising of the Essex Jacobites planned to coincide with the invasion which did not materialize. In spring 1745 he assisted in the passing of the Justices Qualification Act 1744 (18 Geo. 2. c. 20) for the stricter enforcement of his own act of 1732, concerning justices of the peace. He did not stand again 1747 British general election. The 2nd Lord Egmont included him among Members whom it would be essential to bring back into the House on the accession of Frederick, Prince of Wales. He became a Bencher of Middle Temple in 1742.

Bramston died on 14 November 1765 leaving a son and two daughters.

Parliament of Great Britain
Preceded by Sir John Comyns; Thomas Bramston I	Member of Parliament for Maldon; 1727–1734; With: Henry Parsons	Succeeded by Henry Parsons; Martin Bladen
Preceded by The Viscount Castlemaine; Sir Robert Abdy	Member of Parliament for Essex; 1734–1747; With: Sir Robert Abdy	Succeeded by William Harvey; Sir Robert Abdy
