= Thomas Bramston (1658–1737) =

British chancery clerk and Tory politician

Thomas Bramston (1658–1737), of Waterhouse, Writtle, Essex, was a British chancery clerk and Tory politician who sat in the House of Commons from 1712 to 1727.

Bramston was baptized on 10 November 1658, the sixth son of Sir Mundeford Bramston, Master in Chancery, and his wife Alice Le Hunt, daughter of Sir George Le Hunt of Little Bradley, Suffolk. He became a clerk in the six clerks’ office in Chancery Lane, probably through the influence of his father. He married Grace Gregory, daughter of Sir Henry Gregory, rector of Middleton Stoney, Oxfordshire on 7 August 1690 and may have had lodgings, near Chancery Lane as his children were christened at St. Andrew's, Holborn.

Bramston was returned as Tory Member of Parliament for Maldon on the family interest at a by-election on 28 January 1712. In April 1713 he became an alderman of Maldon. He voted for the French commerce bill on 18 June 1713, and was returned unopposed at the 1713 British general election. He was brought into the commission of the peace for Essex in March 1714.

Bramston was returned in a contest for Maldon at the 1715 British general election In October 1715 when his cousin, Anthony Bramston and others were arrested on suspicion of being disaffected to George I, it was probably Thomas Bramston who donated ‘a sirloin of beef and a turkey’ to those imprisoned, which may account for his removal from the bench in March 1716. He was bailiff of Maldon in 1716, and 1720. At the 1722 British general election he was returned for Maldon again in a contest and listed as a Tory. At the 1727 British general election he was probably replaced by his namesake Thomas Bramston of Skreens.

Bramston died on 30 May 1737, leaving two surviving sons and three daughters. Most of his estate went to his eldest son George, who married the daughter of Lawrence Alcock. A trust fund was set up, to be administered partly by Thomas Bramston of Skreens, for his daughters and younger son. His eldest daughter married the third son of Sir Herbert Croft, 1st Baronet. It took two years to obtain probate, because in spite of Bramston's role in the chancery office, his will was full of confusing obliterations and interspersed text

Parliament of Great Britain
Preceded by John Comyns; William Fytche	Member of Parliament for Maldon; 1712–1727; With: John Comyns; Samuel Tufnell; Sir John Comyns	Succeeded by Henry Parsons; Thomas Bramston II
