= Kate Felus =

British historian

Kate Felus (born 1971) is a designed-landscape historian. She studied at the University of Warwick and the University of Bristol. Her specialist subject area is the social history of 18th-century gardens and their buildings.

From 1996 to 2001 Felus was Garden Historian at Stowe, the 18th-century landscape garden, where the National Trust is undertaking a massive restoration programme begun in 1990. Her role included being part of the Stowe Restoration Team, providing specialist research to aid with the production of a series of Conservation Plans that addressed the individual character areas within the formal gardens and wider parkland. The historic research directly influenced and guided a programme of archaeological investigations that were critical to ensuring that the restoration of each character area was accurate and appropriate.

She was a trustee of Hestercombe Gardens surrounding Hestercombe House and has also been involved with buildings conservation both at Stowe and as Project Co-ordinator for the National Trust’s first restoration of a Modernist building, the Erno Goldfinger House at 2 Willow Road, Hampstead.

Recent publications on garden conservation have discussed the landscapes of Blenheim Palace, Dunster Castle, Croome Court and Westbury Court. Her doctoral thesis (University of Bristol, 2009) is entitled "Beautiful objects and agreeable retreats: Uses of Garden Buildings in the designed landscape in 18th-century England".

She is the partner of British sculptor Jon Edgar. She has two sons.

== Publications ==
- 'The Furniture of Erno Goldfinger at 2 Willow Road', Apollo, Vol CXLIII No. 410 (new series) (April, 1996) ISSN 0003-6536
- authors, various (2005). Consuming Passions: Dining from Antiquity to the Eighteenth Century - Eating Alfresco: The use of garden buildings for dining in the eighteenth-century English pleasure ground. UK: NPI Media Group. ISBN 978-0-7524-3445-2.
- ‘Boats and Boating in the Eighteenth Century Landscape’, Garden History, (2006) Vol 34, No. 1. ISSN 0307-1243
- Felus, Kate (2007). Danbury Park - A Guide to the Historic Landscape. UK: Essex County Council. ISBN 978-1-84194-078-6.
- Ed. Eyres, Patrick (2010). The Proceedings of 'Painshill Park and Beyond' Conference: Painshill Park - The Pioneering Restoration of an Eighteenth Century Landscape Garden. UK: New Arcadian Journal. Kate Felus - Charles Hamilton's Buildings: Speculation on the Social Use of Painshill Park pp. 41–50 ISSN 0262-558X
- Ed. Eyres, Patrick (2009). The Grenville Landscape of Wotton House: The Proceedings of the Wotton Landscape Conference October 2009. UK: New Arcadian Journal. Kate Felus - Using the Pleasure Grounds; Their social History pp. 101–111 ISSN 0262-558X
