= Horsleyhope =

Village in County Durham, England

Coordinates: 54.819°N 1.890°W

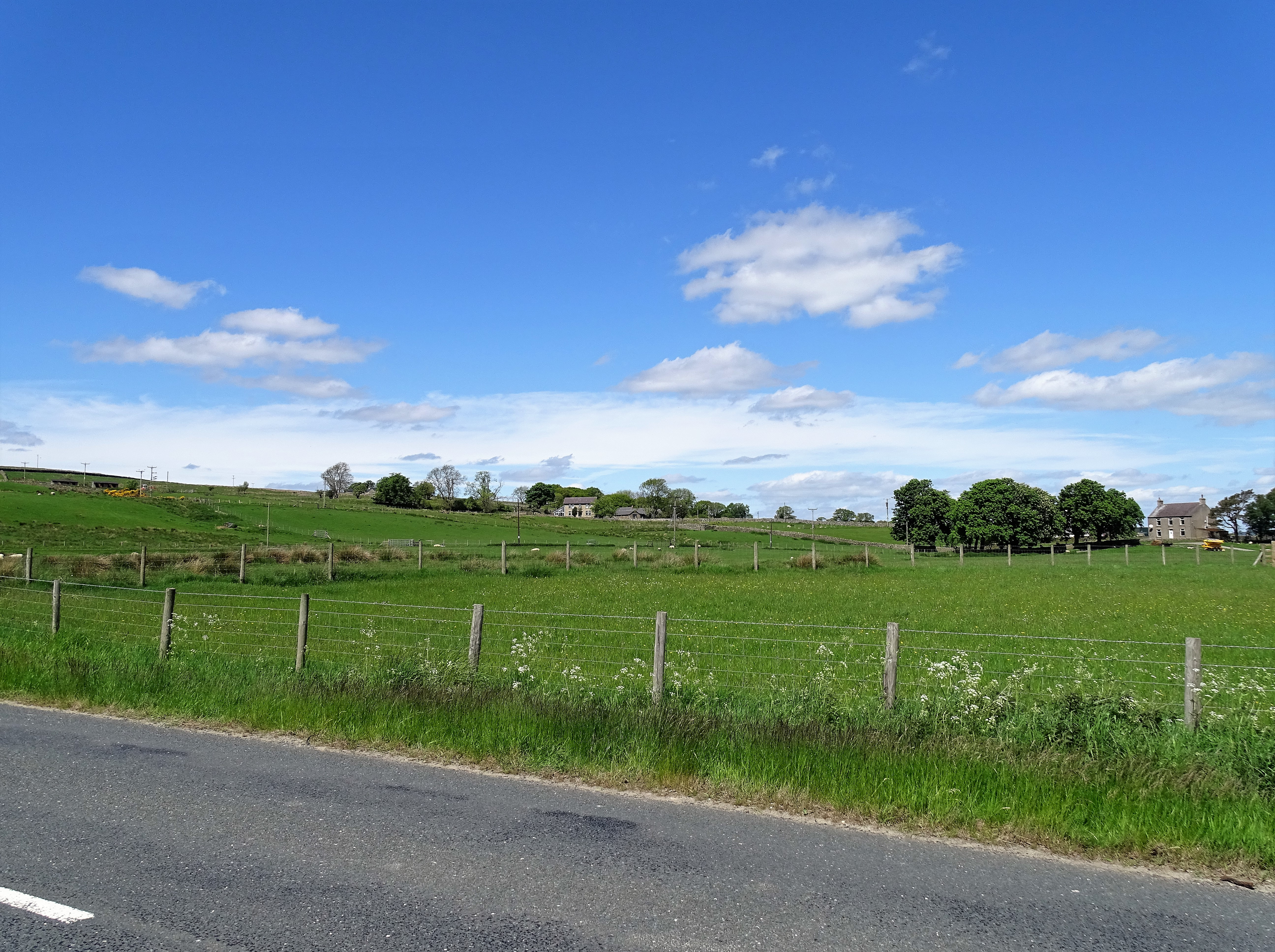
High and Middle Horsleyhope Farms

Horsleyhope is a village in County Durham, England. It is situated a few miles to the south-west of Consett.
