= Mad Dog McPhie =

British professional wrestler

Personal information
- Born: Stewart McPhie; 19 October 1971 (age 54) Corby, Northamptonshire, England

Professional wrestling career
- Ring name: Mad Dog McPhie
- Billed height: 6 ft 3 in (1.91 m)
- Billed weight: 269 lb (122 kg)
- Billed from: Corby, Northants
- Trained by: Justin Richards, NWA UK Hammerlock
- Debut: 1993

Mad Dog McPhie (born Stewart McPhie on 19 October 1971) is an English professional wrestler. He has worked on the United Kingdom's independent circuit.

== Professional wrestling career ==
McPhie was trained as a professional wrestling at Hammerlock Wrestling in Sittingbourne, Kent under trainers Justin Richards, Alex Shane, Dino Scarlo, and Hammerlock's owner Andre "The Hammer" Baker. McPhie competed against many of Hammerlock's wrestlers like "The Phoenix" Jody Fleisch, Paul Ashe, Solid Gold, and Scott Parker. In addition, he teamed with "The Anarchist" Doug Williams against Gary Steele and Jake "The Snake" Roberts on 25 April 1998.

After a short time, McPhie moved on to compete in the independent wrestling scene and competed for the National Wrestling Alliance (NWA) in singles matches against the UK Pitbulls. He also worked for the Catch Wrestling Association before settling with the Ultimate Wrestling Alliance (UWA).

McPhie was a regular rival of Phil Powers and was managed by Steve Lynskey while in the UWA. At British Resurrection, McPhie had a match against Phil Powers. He also had matches with Tom Monroe and Kerry Cabrero, as well as a tag team match with partner Jonny Storm against Phil Powers and Paul Sloane. At Pain on Pleasure Beach, McPhie wrestled Phil Blend and Joe Young. At Vengeance is Mine, he faced Leon Murphy and Jodie Fleisch.

He then returned to the independent scene until July 2002 when on a show for Catch Wrestling Association in Germany, McPhie injured his ACL.

== Championships and accomplishments ==
- Pro Wrestling Illustrated
  - Ranked 496th in Top World 500 Wrestlers (2000)
