= Horsebridge, Devon =

Village in Devon, England

Coordinates: 50.55176°N 4.25917°W

Horsebridge
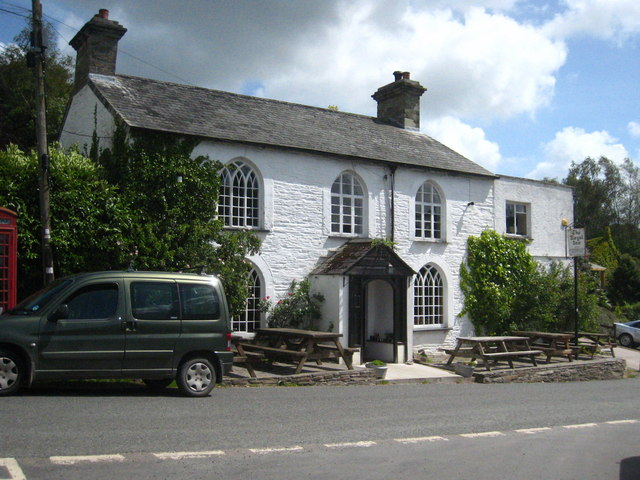
- The Royal Inn

- Location within Devon
- OS grid reference: SX 40006 74874
- Civil parish: Sydenham Damerel
- District: West Devon
- Shire county: Devon
- Region: South West
- Country: England
- Sovereign state: United Kingdom
- Police: Devon and Cornwall
- Fire: Devon and Somerset
- Ambulance: South Western

Horsebridge is a hamlet in the Sydenham Damerel parish, West Devon district, Devon, England in the Tamar Valley. The village of Horsebridge takes its name from the bridge 'Horse Bridge' and is situated just north (but right next to) the bridge. The village is situated on the east bank of the river Tamar. The river Tamar forms part of the boundary between the counties of Devon and Cornwall. Horsebridge is also a crossing point over the river Tamar. The Royal Inn, a pub in the village, claims that its building was formerly a nunnery.

The Bridge is a traditional stone bridge and was built here in 1437. It is one of the earliest crossing points over the river Tamar. The Bridge was the lowest (most southerly) crossing point across the river Tamar, until another bridge was built in Gunnislake circa 1520. Horsebridge (the two words 'Horse' and 'Bridge' are often combined to be the same as the village name) allowed travellers to cross between the two counties of Devon and Cornwall. The bridge became a Grade I listed monument in 1952, and was reputedly built by French Benedictine monks, who then went on to build the nunnery.

The Tamara Coast to Coast path, an 87 miles (140 km) walking/hiking route (which opened in 2023), passes over Horse Bridge (Horsebridge) and through the village of the same name (Stage 4: Gunnislake to Lifton).

The nearest towns are Callington in Cornwall (4 miles) and Tavistock in Devon (5 miles). The bridge sits between the two parishes of Stoke Climsland and Sydenham Damerel.
