= Howe Street, Braintree =

Hamlet in Essex, England

Coordinates: 51.983°N 0.468°E

Howe Street
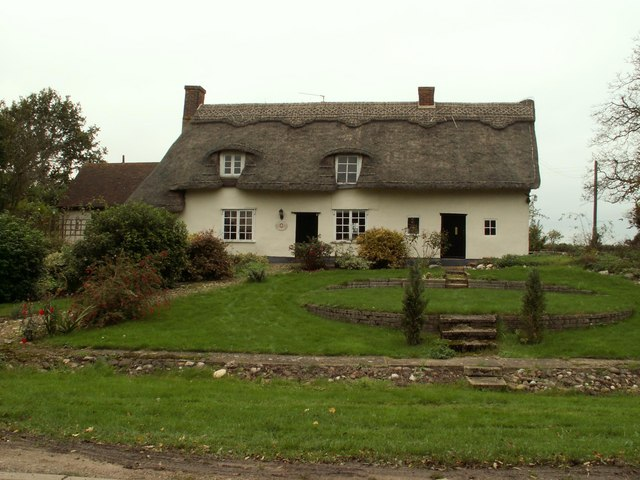
- Thatched cottage at Howe Street

- Location within Essex
- OS grid reference: TL697345
- Civil parish: Finchingfield
- District: Braintree
- Shire county: Essex
- Region: East
- Country: England
- Sovereign state: United Kingdom
- Post town: BRAINTREE
- Postcode district: CM7
- Police: Essex
- Fire: Essex
- Ambulance: East of England

Howe Street is a hamlet in the civil parish of Finchingfield, in the Braintree district of Essex, England. The hamlet is a linear settlement of 1,000 yards (900 m) length, and is 1 mile (1.6 km) northeast from the village of Finchingfield. The county town of Chelmsford is 16 miles (26 km) to the south.
