= Howe Green, Chelmsford =

Village in Essex, England

Coordinates: 51.6986°N 0.52868°E

Howe Green
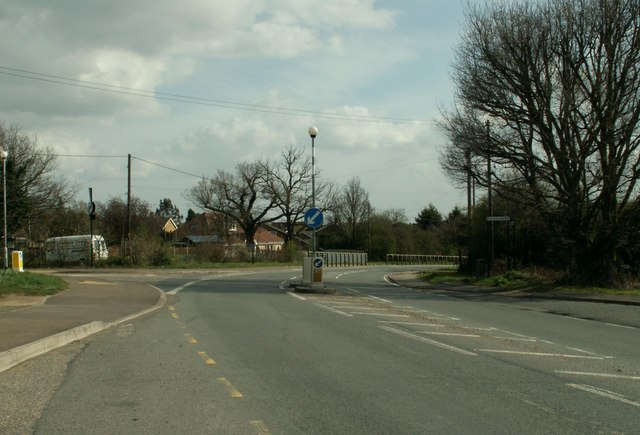

- Location within Essex
- Population: 666 (2011 census)
- Civil parish: Sandon
- District: Chelmsford
- Shire county: Essex
- Region: East
- Country: England
- Sovereign state: United Kingdom

Howe Green is a village in the civil parish of Sandon, in the Chelmsford district, in the county, Essex, England. In 2011 it had a population of 666.

== Transport ==
It was on the A130 road before it was by-passed. The road that it is on is called Southend Road because it goes down to Southend-on-Sea. The junction where the Howe Green by-pass and the Chelmsford by-pass (the A12) meet is junction 17 (Howe Green interchange).

== Location ==
It is a few miles away from the city of Chelmsford.
