= Comyns' Digest =

Book by Sir John Comyns

A Digest of the Laws of England, also known as Comyns' Digest, is a book by Sir John Comyns. The latest English edition was published in 1822. A 120-page, handwritten tabulation by John Neal in 1826 of all cases in the digest is included with the Jeremy Bentham papers at the University College London.

In 1847, John Gage Marvin said:

The most esteemed editions are the first and fifth English, and the first American. Judge Story says "the first is far superior to all the late editions. The modern editions have the addition of the modern Cases, it is true, but they consist of the marginal notes of the reporters, thrust into the text without order or propriety, and destroy the symmetry and conexion." The method and style of Comyns' Digest, differs considerably from any similar production, being based on a systematic and scientific distribution and subdivision of the titles of the law. The author first lays down a general proposition, which he supports and illustrates by examples and authorities, and these are branched out and divided into consequential positions illustrated and supported in the same manner, and finally the doctrines are qualified or restrained by exceptions; "all which is done with remarkable clearness and conciseness of expression, and the information desired is seldom long sought after in vain." It has the honour of being cited and received as an authority in Courts of Justice, which reputation few text books and no other Digest enjoys. Even Comyns' opinions or dicta, have been regarded with all the consideration that is due to decisions of the highest judicial tribunals. Lord Kenyon, in alluding to a position in the Digest, says - Comyns "has not indeed cited any authority for this opinion, but his opinion alone is of great authority, since he was considered by his contemporaries as the most able lawyer in Westminster Hall." Chief Justice Best also remarks, upon citing Comyns: "This he lays down on his own authority, without referring to any case; and I am warranted in saying, we cannot have a better authority than that learned writer." For its exact and methodical analysis, for the succinct, perspicuous, and compressed form in which the Cases are stated, Comyns' Digest stands unrivalled in the annals of the law. Its extreme condensation of authorities, renders it chiefly valuable as a book of reference to the Reports, and by its wonderful accuracy rarely leads the consulter astray. The author seems to have particularly exerted himself in elaborating the title Pleader, which is "a more systematic compilation upon Pleading than had previously appeared; comprising the substance not only of the authorities collected in the Doctrina Placitandi, but also of the Cases subsequently decided, and reducing the whole under different heads upon a plan peculiarly scientific and masterly."

Comyns' Digest was originally composed in law French, and the headings of the titles, still retaining this venerable jargon, may give the novice a little trouble in finding the desired object of pursuit. Some mistakes of Comyns will be found noticed in 5 Taunt. 707, 709; 1 Maul. & Sel. 363; 1 Barn. & Ald. 712; (3) 586; (4) 442; 3 Mason, 283.

The American edition of Comyns is ably edited.

8 A. J. 276; 1 Bart. Conv. 70; Wood. El. Juris, 103; Morgan's Vade Mecum, Pref. 10; 3 Co. Lit. note, 96, 17, a; 6 N. A. Rev. 74; 3 T.R. 51, 64, 631; Warren's L.S. 778, 820; 1 Kent's Com. 510; 8 Price, 61; 5 Bingham, 387, 388; Part II. Brooks' Bib. Leg. 234.; Step. Pl. Pref.; 7 T.R. 743; 4 Ves. 342.
