= Phil Powers =

British professional wrestler

Personal information
- Born: Philip Poll; 27 September 1978 (age 47) Danbury, Essex, England

Professional wrestling career
- Ring name: Phil Powers
- Billed height: 5 ft 10 in (1.78 m)
- Billed weight: 220 lb (100 kg)
- Trained by: Johnny Kidd
- Debut: 1993

Philip Poll (born 27 September 1978) is an English professional wrestler, best known by his ringname "Flying" Phil Powers, who has worked on the United Kingdom's independent circuit for over 15 years.

== Career ==
Phil Powers was trained by Johnny Kidd before debuting in 1993, Powers went on to team with Paul Tyrrell as the Essex Boys.

In 1999 Powers joined the roster of newly formed Ultimate Wrestling Alliance, which aired on L!veTV. Here Powers had the first televised British wrestling match in over 10 years against Stewart "Mad Dog" McPhie, There was no love lost between Powers and McPhie after a disagreement during tapings of L!VE TV's CatFights show ending in Powers getting powerbombed on the studio floor. This led to a number of matches and widening the saga between "Mad Dog Mcphie", his manager Steve Lynskey and stablemates "The Anarchist" Doug Williams, "The WonderKid" Jonny Storm and Drew McDonald. The Ultimate Wrestling Alliance disappeared from television and wrestling when L!VE TV ceased to air.

In July 2004, Powers made an entry into Revolution British Wrestling. On the evening of Saturday 24 July, Powers made his debut acting as an official (referee) for all of the evening's contests, Powers called every match right down the middle, being impartial to all competitors until the shocking events of the RBW British Welterweight Championship main event contest between the reigning Champion, Sammy Ray, and challenger "The Gift" Ross Jordan. Tension was already high, with both wrestlers having crossed paths on several occasions in the past, and Ross Jordan being a former champion himself.

Powers made a speech about the death of British wrestling veteran and TV actor "Bomber" Pat Roach and the request to play the British national anthem before the main event got fans to think they were seeing a different side to Powers, or so they were to believe as no one was expecting the following events.

Powers began a feud with Sammy Ray followed by a rampage through the ranks of RBW, defeating Andy Boy Simmonz, Eamon O'Neill, Jason Rumble, UK Kid, as well as Sammy Ray, determined to prove his point.

Powers would continue to wrestle with the Revolution British Wrestling (which would later become Varsity Pro Wrestling). During the last few RBW shows Powers, one of RBW's top heels, lost a match to one of the promotion's main babyfaces, The UK Kid to reignite their feud.

The second show featured an eight-man knockout tournament; both the UK Kid and Powers advanced through the quarter-finals. During the semi-finals, UK Kid advanced but Powers lost his match against on/off teammate Doug Williams by forfeit after claiming to be injured. In the finals Doug Williams defeated the UK Kid following help from Powers.

The UK Kid and Powers continued their feuding into the debut of VPW. On September 16, 2005 VPW held their debut show from the Horndean Technology College, in which UK Kid cost Powers and Williams a match against the debuting Ballard Brothers getting a bit of revenge from the events months before. VPW went on to hold two more shows from Horndean before the end of the year, one on 28 October and the other on 25 November. During the first of these last two show UK Kid won the right to face Powers in a match after defeating a hand-picked opponent in Joe E. Legend, but this match was not fought under the confines of a normal match: it was e a ladder match with the position of VPW spokesmen on the line. During the November show UK Kid defeated Powers in the ladder match to become the Official VPW Spokesman.

During November, Powers won a tournament for Premier Promotions' vacant PWF (Premier Wrestling Federation) Light-Heavyweight Championship. On 4 February 2006 Powers made his first successful title defence against The UK Kid.

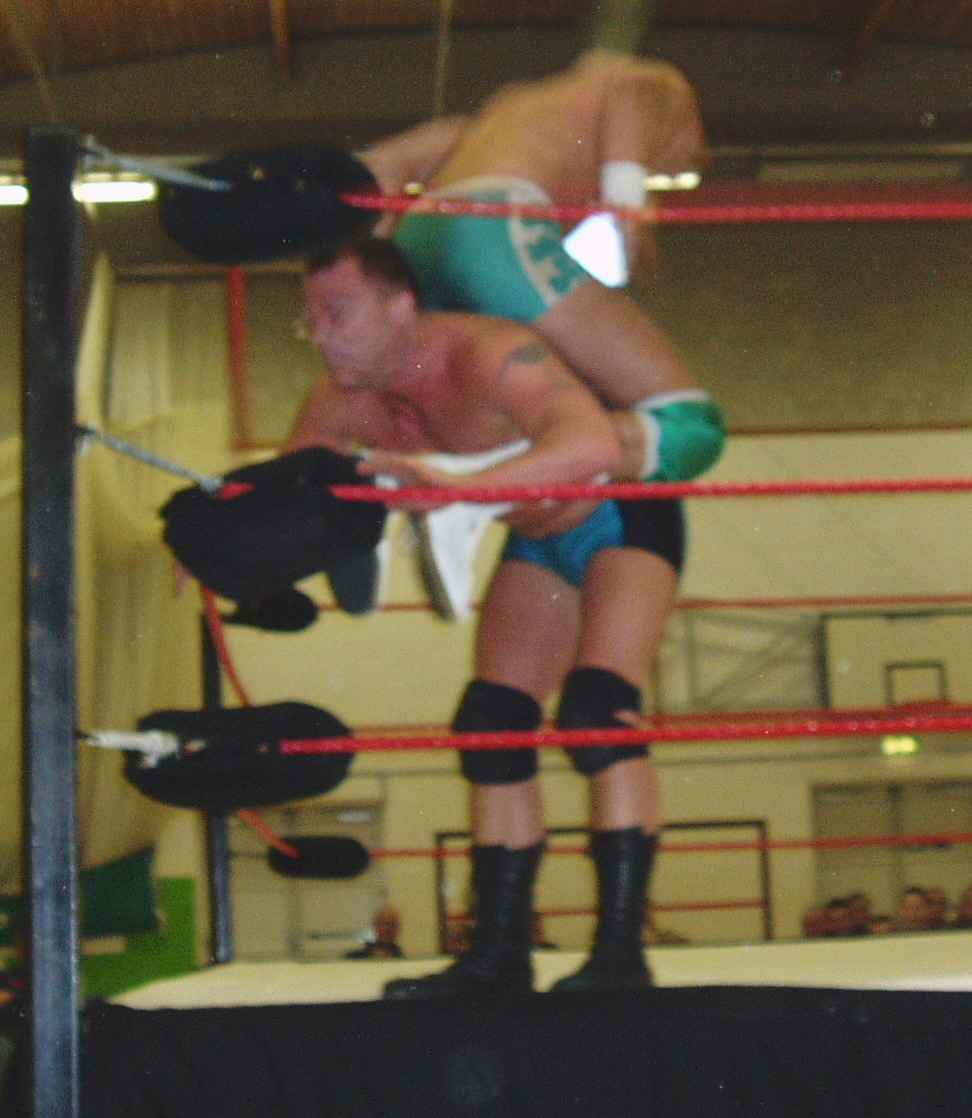
Eamon O'Neill performs his signature sunset flip out of the corner on Powers during a VPW show

At a VPW show on 17 February, after defeating Irish star Eamon O'Neill, Powers cut a promo about how British wrestlers are better than Americans until he was interrupted by Kip James, making his first UK appearance, telling Powers to shut the hell up; the pair got into a small shoving match which saw James come out on top. Later that night James faced a rising star in Chris Andrews; during the match Powers tried to interfere with the match up, only to be disposed off by both men, though this distraction cost Andrews his match against James.

On the next show in Exeter, Devon one day later, Powers (with his valet Erin Angel) faced Chris Andrews in a singles match. During this match, Erin Angel tried to get involved using her own handbag to hit Andrews, but missed and hit her man Powers instead, Andrews then took the handbag only to get disqualified when the referee saw him hit Powers with it.

Powers not only wrestled, he was also a trainer running his own school with Erin Angel in Southampton. In March 2005 Power began promoting shows under the name Real Quality Wrestling. After a few months he hired Len Davies to handle production and video editing; Powers eventually left the company leaving Davies to promote shows under the RQW banner himself.

Powers went on to promote shows successfully for the next 3 years using the banner Live Wrestling Entertainment, while Len Davies paused promotions under the name RQW, concentrating on TV licensing and support of the British wrestling industry as an umbrella organisation. RQW currently operates from RQW House in Dagenham, Essex, and runs training schools as well as providing multimedia support for the revived FWA organisation. RQW Programming is currently being licensed worldwide through various agencies. Both Powers and Davies still work together on occasions.

Powers continues to compete on the independent circuit of the UK. There are rumours that Powers, Mad Dog Mcphie, Dan Berlinka and the owners of Ultimate Wrestling Alliance Andrew and Paul Martin are talking about a 10-year reunion.

== Championships and accomplishments ==
- Hearts and Essex Wrestling
  - HEW Tag Team Championship (1 time) - with Paul Tyrrell
- Premier Promotions
  - PWF Light Heavyweight Championship (1 time)
- Ultimate Wrestling Alliance
  - UWA Heavyweight Championship (1 time)
  - UWA Television Championship (1 time)
- World Association of Wrestling
  - WAW Tag Team Championship (1 time) - with Paul Tyrrell
- Other accomplishments
  - Young Wrestler of the Year 1993
