= Phil Powers (climber) =

American alpinist, author and educator (born 1961)

Personal information
- Born: February 20, 1961 (age 65) Oklahoma
- Occupations: alpinist, author and educator
- Website: americanalpineclub.org

Climbing career
- Type of climber: Alpinist

Phil Powers (born February 20, 1961) is an American alpinist, author and educator. He is famous for his first ascent of the Washburn Face of Denali, as well as his significant leadership roles within the climbing industry.

== Biography ==
Born in Oklahoma to Jack and Betsy Powers, Phil began climbing at age 15. Since then, his achievements have included the first ascent of the Washburn Face of Denali (named in honor of Bradford Washburn), the first winter traverse of the Cathedral Group in the Grand Tetons, the first ascent of Western Edge (a 23-pitch rock route) on Lukpilla Brakk in Baltistan, the first American ascent of Gasherbrum II in Pakistan, and an ascent of K2 without supplemental oxygen. Powers has also led dozens of expeditions to South America, Alaska and Pakistan's Karakoram Range.

He is currently the executive director of the American Alpine Club (2005–present). Powers also served as vice president for institutional advancement at Naropa University and worked for seventeen years with the National Outdoor Leadership School as chief mountaineering instructor and development/partnerships director. He is also the owner of Jackson Hole Mountain Guides and author of NOLS Wilderness Mountaineering.
