= Horton Heath, Dorset =

Village in Dorset, England

Coordinates: 50°51′26″N 1°55′03″W

Horton Heath
- Location within Dorset
- Civil parish: Horton
- Unitary authority: Dorset
- Ceremonial county: Dorset
- Region: South West
- Country: England
- Sovereign state: United Kingdom
- Post town: WIMBORNE
- Postcode district: BH21
- Dialling code: 01202
- Police: Dorset
- Fire: Dorset and Wiltshire
- Ambulance: South Western
- UK Parliament: North Dorset

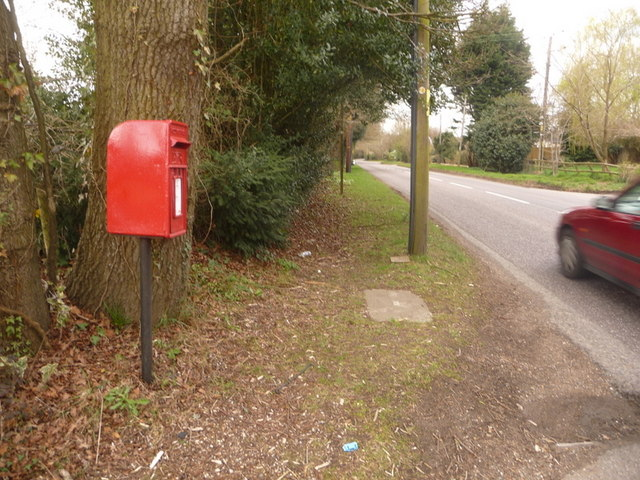
Horton Heath

Horton Heath is a small village in Dorset, England situated one mile from Three Legged Cross and two miles from Horton. It consists of a main road, with Slough Lane and an unnamed road as the only two paved roads coming off it. There are several farms.
