= Sandon, Essex =

Village in Essex, England

Coordinates: 51.715°N 0.526°E

Sandon
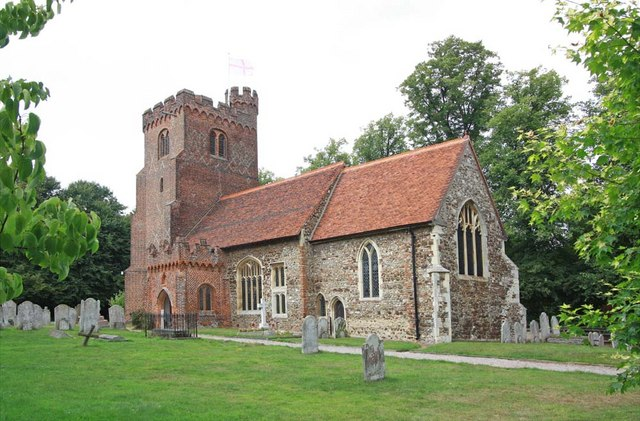
- St Andrew's Church, Sandon

- Location within Essex
- Population: 1,535 (Parish, 2021)
- OS grid reference: TL731052
- District: Chelmsford
- Shire county: Essex
- Region: East
- Country: England
- Sovereign state: United Kingdom
- Post town: Chelmsford
- Postcode district: CM2
- Dialling code: 01245
- Police: Essex
- Fire: Essex
- Ambulance: East of England
- UK Parliament: Maldon & East Chelmsford

Sandon is a village and civil parish in the Chelmsford district of Essex, England. It lies 2.5 miles (4 km) south-east of the centre of Chelmsford, close to junction 17 of the A12 and adjacent to Great Baddow. At the 2021 census the parish had a population of 1,535.

Sandon has a secondary school, located on Molrams Lane, which forms the border between Sandon and Great Baddow. The Sandon School, in Chelmsford, Essex, is an 11–18 mixed comprehensive academy with approximately 1,200 students. The school also hosts Sandon Soccer, Chelmsford's only FA short-sided soccer venue.

The village also contains a parish church (St Andrew's) opposite the village green and a Brethren meeting hall on Molrams Lane. Sandon's only pub, The Crown, dates from the eighteenth century and is situated on the village green.

There are two pits located next to the A12 created by gravel extraction during previous decades. In recent years these pits have been subject to an application to be utilized as landfill sites, but have since been planted over and are used by children as play areas and by dog walkers.

== History ==
A settlement named Benedsteda was recorded here in the 1086 Domesday book with a population of eleven.

Sandon St Andrews is the parish church which was constructed around the year 1080 predominantly of pudding stone and flint rubble with an aisle added in the fourteenth century. The west tower and porch were added in 1520 and may have been designed by Girlano Trevise, architect of Hampton Court, although this is by no means certain. The pulpit dates is Octagonal and dates from the fifteenth century. A pillar piscina from the twelfth century was also found during church restorations during 1908 and is now located in the church.

William Rackliff owned clay pits near to the village and constructed four cottages around the village green in the mid nineteenth century which is the origin of the road name Brick Kiln Road.

The village was known for a rare Spanish oak planted in 1887 to celebrate Queen Victorias Jubilee which grew over the next century to cover almost the whole village green. However the tree collapsed in 2001 due to a fungal infection and was replaced by three English oaks. A village shop and school also both existed until the latter half of the twentieth century.

Major changes to the village over the last 40 years include the building of the Gablefields estate (on the east edge of the village) on the site of the old Gable Farm in 1975, the construction of the A12 bypass further to the east around 1986, and the construction in the intervening area of an extension to Gablefields, The Lintons, in the 1990s.

The village is now classed as part of the Chelmsford built up area as defined by the Office for National Statistics.
