= Horsham, Worcestershire =

Hamlet in Worcestershire, England

Coordinates: 52.220636°N 2.38693°W

Horsham
- Location within Worcestershire
- District: Malvern Hills
- Shire county: Worcestershire
- Region: West Midlands
- Country: England
- Sovereign state: United Kingdom
- Police: West Mercia
- Fire: Hereford and Worcester
- Ambulance: West Midlands

Horsham is a hamlet in Worcestershire, England. Remains of an old Iron Age fort are located within the village. The village is named after the market town of Horsham in West Sussex.
