= B roads in Zone 1 of the Great Britain numbering scheme =

The numbering zones for roads in Great Britain

B roads are numbered routes in Great Britain of lesser importance than A roads. See the article Great Britain road numbering scheme for the rationale behind the numbers allocated.

== Zone 1 (3 digits) ==
Road	From	To	Notes	Length
B100	Appold Street, near A501 Moorgate, London	A1 Barbican Underground station, London	Beech Street, Chiswell Street, Sun Street; Sun Street is one-way westbound.	0.4 miles (0.64 km)
B101	A5201 Old Street, London	A1200 East Road, London	Pitfield Street, New North Road. Partly one-way northbound. Partly cycles only.	0.4 miles (0.64 km)
B102	A1200 New North Road, London	A104 Balls Pond Road, London	Southgate Road; Originally ran along Bridport Place (now a path through Shoreditch Park).	0.8 miles (1.3 km)
B103 (defunct)	A1201 St. Paul's Road, London	A104 Balls Pond Road, London	Became a portion of the A1199 after the 1960s.	
B104	A105 Newington Green, London	A10 in Stoke Newington, London	Albion Road, Stoke Newington Church Street	1.1 miles (1.8 km)
B105	A1201 in Finsbury Park near London	A10 in Stoke Newington near London	Brownswood Road, Lordship Park, Manor Road	1.3 miles (2.1 km)
B106	B550 in Muswell Hill near London	A406 in Bowes Park near London	Original route ran from the A553 to the A10/A107 in Stamford Hill; this was upgraded to a portion of the A107 early on.	1.6 miles (2.6 km)
B107 (defunct)	A1203 in East Smithfield	A1204, west end of Wapping High Street	Thomas More Street. Declassified.	
B108	A1203 in Shadwell, London	A104 junction in Dalston	Queensbridge Road, Warner Place, Squirries Street, Vallance Road, New Road and Cannon Street Road	2.5 miles (4.0 km)
B109	A118 Forest Gate	A124 East Ham	Original route ran from A107 to A104 in Hackney; this became a portion of the A107 when Mare Street was downgraded in the center of Hackney.	1.2 miles (1.9 km)
B110 (defunct)	A104 in Hackney	A107 in Hackney	Became a portion of the A107 when Mare Street was downgraded in the center of Hackney.	
B110 (defunct)	A1 in Holloway	A103/A503 in Holloway	Essentially an extension of the B516, which was on the other side of the A1; now a part of the A107.	
B111	A10, Stoke Newington, London	A107, Upper Clapton near rail station	Northwold Road	0.6 miles (0.97 km)
B112	A102 Homerton	A12 near Hackney Wick	Marsh Hill, Homerton Road	0.8 miles (1.3 km)
B113	A107 Hackney Central	A106 Homerton	Number also appears on maps on a section of downgraded A629 north of Sheffield; this is an error as the actual number is B6546.	1.2 miles (1.9 km)
B114 (defunct)	B112 in Homerton	B118 in Old Ford	Section south of the B113 was upgraded to Class I status, possibly as the A102, by 1939; the northern half gained that number much later. The northern half was upgraded again to A102(M) in the 1970s, but was downgraded in the 2000s and is now the A12.	
B115 (defunct)	A107 in South Hackney	A11 in Leytonstone	Upgraded to Class I status in 1924 to bypass the A11 through Leytonstone and Stratford; the section west of the A112 became the A106 with the remainder gaining that number much later. Due to the A12, much of the original route was rerouted; the old route across the rail line is now severed and Church Lane declassified.	
B116 (defunct)	B114 in Cadogan Gate	B113 Chapman Road	Later absorbed into the A115; much of route obliterated by the A12.	
B117 (defunct)	B115 (now A106) South Hackney	A11 Mile End	Upgraded to a portion of the A1205 in the 1970s.	
B118	B142 near Bow	A1208 Shoreditch, London	Columbia Road, Gosset Street, Old Bethnal Green Road, Old Ford Road	2.3 miles (3.7 km)
B119	A107 Bethnal Green, London	A12 near Bow, London	Roman Road	1.3 miles (2.1 km)
B120	B119 Bethnal Green	A11 Stepney Green	Globe Road	0.5 miles (0.8 km)
B121	A11 near Stepney Green, London	A13 Limehouse, London	Stepney Green, Stepney High Street, Belgrave Street	0.7 miles (1.1 km)
B122	A10 Shoreditch High Street	A1209 Bethnal Green Road	Original route ran from the A11 to the A13 in Poplar; this was upgraded to Class I status in the 1930s, possibly as the A102, and was upgraded again to the A102(M) in the 1970s when the East Cross Route was built. Part of the original B122 still exists along St Leonards Street in Bow, but much of the route is now gone due to the motorway construction. The route is now part of the A12 when the motorway was downgraded in 2000.	0.3 miles (0.48 km)
B123 (defunct)	A1205 in Poplar	B124 in Poplar	Declassified due to the A1261, which bypassed the route to the south.	
B124 (defunct)	A13 in Poplar	A1206 in Millwall	Became an extension of the A1206.	
B125	A12 near Bow, London	A13 near Canning Town	Abbott Road	0.7 miles (1.1 km)
B126	A13 Limehouse, London	A1202 (Dock Street) near Tower Gateway DLR station	Cable Street	1.1 miles (1.8 km)
B127	A107 Cambridge Heath railway station	B118 near Bethnal Green	Bishops Way, Stewardstone Road	0.6 miles (0.97 km)
B128 (defunct)	Moorgate, London	Aldersgate Street, London	Declassified.	
B129 (defunct)	Moorgate, London	Beech Street, London	Declassified.	
B130 (defunct)	Threadneedle Street, London	Liverpool Street, London	Declassified.	
B131 (defunct)	A3 in London	A1212/A1213 in London	Declassified.	
B132 (defunct)	A100 at Tower Hill, London	A3211 in London	Upgraded in the 1970s and renumbered as an extension of the A3211 in the 1990s.	
B133 (defunct)	B132 (now A3211) in London	B132 (now A3211) in London	Declassified.	
B134	A1211 Aldgate, London	A1209 near Shoreditch	Alie Street, Osborn Street, Brick Lane	1-mile (1.6 km)
B135	A1209 Bethnal Green Road	A107 Cambridge Heath Road	Sclater Street, Cheshire Street, Dunbridge Street, Three Colts Lane	0.8 miles (1.3 km)
B137	A1010 Ponders End, London	A1055 near Angel Road railway station	Montagu Road, Nightingale Road	1.8 miles (2.9 km)
B138	B151 Wood Green, London	B150 near Harringay railway station	Wightman Road, Alroy Road	1.4 miles (2.3 km)
B140	B121 Stepney, London	A12 near Bow, London	Devas Street, Devons Road, St Pauls Way, Rhodeswell Road, Ben Jonson Road	1.9 miles (3.1 km)
B141 (defunct)	A109 in London	A109 in London	Declassified.	
B142	A11 Bow, London	B118 near Bow, London	Fairfield Road, Tredegar Road, Parnell Road	0.6 miles (0.97 km)
B144	B100 Moorgate, London	A1200 near Shoreditch Park, London	Eagle Wharf Road, Shepherdess Walk, Bath Street, Bunhill Row.	1.1 miles (1.8 km)
B145 (defunct)	A13 in London	A102 in London	St Leonards Road, London	
B146	A110 near Chingford, London	A1009 near Woodford, London	Friday Hill	0.5 miles (0.8 km)
~~B147~~	unused			
B148	A127 Dunton Wayletts	A176 in Basildon	West Mayne, St Nicholas Lane	2.8 miles (4.5 km)
B149	A1013 near Little Thurrock	A126 near Chadwell St Mary	Wood View, Chadwell Bypass	1.4 miles (2.3 km)
B150	A1201 near Finsbury Park, London	A105 near Seven Sisters, London	Woodstock Road, Florence Road, Upper Tollington Park, Endymion Road	0.8 miles (1.3 km)
B151	A109 near Wood Green, London	B138 near Wood Green, London	Hornsey Park Road, Mayes Road, Station Road, Park Avenue	0.8 miles (1.3 km)
B152	A105 in Harringay, London	A10 near Stamford Hill, London	St Ann's Road	1.2 miles (1.9 km)
B153	A504 in West Green, London	A10 near Seven Sisters, London	Philip Lane	0.8 miles (1.3 km)
B154	A105 near Winchmore Hill, London	A1010 in Edmonton, London	Church Road	1.4 miles (2.3 km)
B155	A109 between Wood Green, London and Tottenham, London	A504 in Seven Sisters, London	Belmont Road, Downhills Way	0.9 miles (1.4 km)
B155 (defunct)	A110 in East Barnet	A1005 south of Potters Bar	Upgraded to an extension of the A111 by 1926. The original northern end of this B155 is now gone due to M25 junction 24.	
B155 (defunct)	A105 in Wood Green, London	A109 in Wood Green, London	Renumbered as a portion of the A1080 in the 1970s. The current B155 is not far from this route.	
B156	A1000 near Potters Bar	A10 near Cheshunt		8.1 miles (13.0 km)
B157	A1000 near Brookmans Park	B156 in Cuffley	Plough Hill, The Ridgeway, Shepherds Hill	3.3 miles (5.3 km)
B158	A602 near Tonwell, Hertfordshire	A1000 near Potters Bar, Hertfordshire	The B158 originally started from the A10 at Wadesmill, but since the opening of the High Cross bypass, has been truncated.	10.9 miles (17.5 km)
B159	A112 in Leyton, London	A104 in Leyton, London	Leyton Green Road	0.3 miles (0.48 km)
B160	A104 / A114 Whipps Cross – near Leytonstone, London	A110 near Chingford, London	Wood Street, Fulbourne Road, Winchester Road and Larkshall Road	3.6 miles (5.8 km)
B161	A114 in Forest Gate, London	A112 near Leyton, London	Dames Road, Harrow Road, Cathall Road, Francis Road	1.4 miles (2.3 km)
B162 (defunct)	A11/A115 in Leytonstone	A114 in Wanstead	Became a portion of the A114 when it was rerouted, possibly in the early 1930s.	
B162 (defunct)	A118 in Romford	A125 in Romford	Now part of A125 and A1251.	
B163 (defunct)	B113 in Stratford, London	Stratford Market railway station	Section north of the A11 absorbed into the A115 and the southern section was declassified.	
B164	A11 near Stratford, London	B165 West Ham, London	Vicarage Lane	0.4 miles (0.64 km)
B165	A112 West Ham, London	A118 Manor Park, London	Densham Road, Portway, Plashet Road, Plashet Grove, East Avenue, Browning Road, Church Road, Little Ilford Lane	3.4 miles (5.5 km)
B167	A118 Upton Park, London	A117 East Ham, London	Green Street, Central Park Road, Cheltenham Gardens, Rancliffe Road	2.1 miles (3.4 km)
B168	A11 in South Woodford, London	A113 South Woodford, London	George Lane, The Viaduct and Daisy Road	0.6 miles (0.97 km)
B169	A110 Chingford, London	A112 near Chingford, London	Original route was a loop off the A11 (now A104) to serve Loughton; this was renumbered as an extension of the A121 in the mid-1920s.	0.6 miles (0.97 km)
B170	A121 Buckhurst Hill, Essex	A113 Chigwell, Essex		2 miles (3.2 km)
B171 (defunct)	A113 near Chigwell, Essex	A121 near Loughton	Renumbered to A1168, possibly when the M11 was built and M11 junction 5 (Loughton Interchange) put in.	
B172	A104/A121 Wake Arms Roundabout, near Loughton Essex	A113 Abridge, Essex		3.5 miles (5.6 km)
B173	A113 Woodford Bridge, London	A1112 Chigwell Row, Essex		2.7 miles (4.3 km)
B174	A1112 near Collier Row, London	A12 near Mawneys, London	Formerly went to A113; this section north of A1112 became part of an extended A1112.	2.3 miles (3.7 km)
B175	B174 near Romford, London	A113 Passingford Bridge, Essex		5.5 miles (8.9 km)
B176	A1170 Turnford near Cheshunt, Hertfordshire	A121 Waltham Cross near Cheshunt, London	Original route ran from Ilford to Beacontree Heath; this was upgraded to the A1083 in 1925.	2.7 miles (4.3 km)
B177	A124 Barking, London	A12 Goodmayes, London	Passes Goodmayes railway station	2.2 miles (3.5 km)
B178	A1112 Dagenham East, London	A1306 Dagenham, London	Formerly went north to what is now A1240; this became part of rerouted A1112.	0.8 miles (1.3 km)
B179	A112 Walthamstow, London	A503 Walthamstow, London	Original route ran from Hoddesdon to Stanstead St Margaret's; this was upgraded to Class I status as a spur of the A10 in 1935 and later renumbered A1032, then downgraded to an extension of the B180, and downgraded again in the 1980s to Class III status as the C43 when the roads at both ends were upgraded.	1.9 miles (3.1 km)
B180	B181 Stanstead Abbotts, Hertfordshire	B1004 Widford, Hertfordshire		3.8 miles (6.1 km)
B181	A1170 Stanstead St. Margarets, Hertfordshire	A414 Tyler's Green, Essex		13.6 miles (21.9 km)
B182	B181 near Epping	B1393 Epping		1.3 miles (2.1 km)
B183	A414 Harlow, Essex	B1256 Takeley, Essex		9.8 miles (15.8 km)
B184	A128/A414 Chipping Ongar, Essex	M11/A11/A1301 Ickleton, Essex		30.4 miles (48.9 km)
B185	A1023 Brentwood	B186 Brentwood near Rail Station		0.2 miles (0.32 km)
B186	A128 Brentwood	A1306 West Thurrock		11.4 miles (18.3 km)
B187	B186 Cranham, London	A124 Upminster, London		2 miles (3.2 km)
B188	A1013, Thurrock	A128 near Orsett, Thurrock		3 miles (4.8 km)
B189	A126 Grays	Thames Road/Argent Street Roundabout		0.3 miles (0.48 km)
B190 (defunct)	A1 (now B197)/B653 in Stanborough	A1 in Lemsford	The eastern side became a portion of the A1000 in the 1970s with the southern section now A6129 and the northern now B195.	
B191	A1083 Green Lane, London	A124 Longbridge Road, Dagenham, London	Bennett's Castle Lane	0.8 miles (1.3 km)
B192	A123 Gants Hill, London	A1400 near Gants Hill, London	Beehive Lane	0.7 miles (1.1 km)
B193	A1000 Great North Road, Barnet, London	A110 East Barnet, London	Longmore Avenue	1-mile (1.6 km)
B194	A1170 Broxbourne, Hertfordshire	A121 Waltham Abbey, Essex	Connects Lower Nazeing with A roads	5.9 miles (9.5 km)
B195	A1000 near Welwyn Garden City	A414 Cole Green		2.2 miles (3.5 km)
B196 (defunct)	A11	B174	Became part of an extended A1112.	
B197	B656, Baldock	A6129/A1(M)/B653	Breaks along A602 through Stevenage	10.4 miles (16.7 km)
B198	A47 near Wisbech	A47 near Wisbech	This is the old A1135, which replaced part of the A47 when the bypass opened in 1984. Road number is also in use near Cheshunt (see below).	4.5 miles (7.2 km)
B198	A10 / A121 junction near Waltham Cross	B156 in Goff's Oak near Cheshunt	The Cheshunt Southern Relief Road, formerly part of the A121 and renumbered around the time this section of the M25 was completed. Road number is duplicated in Wisbech (see above) with both still being in use.	1.8 miles (2.9 km)
B199	B1003	A15 in Lincoln	This is the old A57 renumbered in 2017 because the A57 was rerouted south. Road number is also in use near Cheshunt.	4.5 miles (7.2 km)

== Zone 1 (4 digits) ==
Road	From	To	Notes	Length
B1000	A1000 at Welwyn Garden City	A119 at Hertford		4.3 mi (6.9 km)
B1001	A10 at Ware	A1170 at Ware		
B1002	Brentwood	Margaretting	Original route of the A12. Originally used from Ware to Bishop's Stortford; reclassified as the A119 by 1938. But by 1975 (just before the M11 opened past Bishop's Stortford), it had reverted to Class II as the B1004.	
B1003	Lincoln College	Far Wharf	Formerly had a second section from the B1273 Brayford Way to the A1434 Newark Road until 2017, when this section was renumbered as the A1192. The sections connected via Wigford Way, Brayford Wharf East, and Rope Walk until the late 1990s. Originally ran along Potter Street and South Street in Bishop's Stortford. This was upgraded to the A1059, but was downgraded to the B1529 in 2007 due to rerouting of the A1184 onto the western bypass.	
B1004	Ware	Bishop's Stortford	Section south of what is now the A1250 was the B1002.	
B1005 (defunct)	Bishop's Stortford	Hatfield Heath	Upgraded to the A1060 in the 1960s.	
B1006	A13 in South Benfleet	B1014 in Benfleet	Original route ran from the A122 in Writtle to the A414. Upgraded to Class I status as the A1091 by 1927, became a part of the A414 between 1978 and 1982 and finally declassified in 1986 due to general renumbering around Chelmsford following completion of the bypass.	
B1007	Stanford-le-Hope	Chelmsford		
B1008	Chelmsford	Dunmow	The section from Little Waltham to Dunmow was downgraded from the A130.	
B1009	Chelmsford	Galleywood		
B1010	A414 Woodham Mortimer	Burnham-on-Crouch		
B1011 (defunct)	A13 (now B1464) in Pitsea	A129 in Wickford	Section north of the A127 was renumbered to A132 in the 1950s. In the 1960s the A132 was extended south, replacing more of the B1011 and leaving only the section through Burnt Mills, which has since been declassified.	
B1012	South Woodham Ferrers	B1010 near North Fambridge	Connecting the B1010 with A132	
B1013	Rayleigh Church	A127 Prittlewell ('Tesco' roundabout)	To A127 (The Bell) via Rochford prior to 1996	
B1014	Canvey Island	A13 in Hadleigh		
B1015	Westcliff-on-Sea	Southend-on-Sea		
B1016	A1160 Southend-on-Sea	Shoeburyness		
B1017	A13 near North Shoebury	Great Wakering		
B1018	Southminster	Braintree		
B1019	Hatfield Peverel	Langford		
B1020	Langford	Broad Street Green	Jubilee Way, opened September 2025. Originally used from Althorne to Southminster. Renumbered as an extension of the B1018 around 1992 (the B1020 number appears on the 1991 edition of the OS 1:250k map but not the 1993 edition).	
B1021	Burnham-on-Crouch	Bradwell Waterside		
B1022	Heybridge	Colchester		
B1023	near Kelvedon	Tollesbury		
B1024	Kelvedon	Earls Colne		
B1025	Colchester	West Mersea	crosses from the mainland to Mersea Island by way of The Strood which is covered by the sea at the time of high spring tides.	
B1026	B1022 at Heybridge	A133 in Colchester	Original B1026 ran between the A12 and A133; upgraded to the A1070 in 1924 but downgraded to the B1422 in the 1940s. Much of the route is now the A134.	15.4 mi (24.8 km)
B1027	A133 south of Colchester	A133 at Clacton-on-Sea	by way of Alresford, Thorrington, Great Bentley and St Osyth	12.1 mi (19.5 km)
B1028	B1027 at the University of Essex	Wivenhoe		
B1029	A12 J30 near Stratford St Mary	Brightlingsea	by way of Dedham, Ardleigh, Great Bromley, Frating, Great Bentley and Thorrington	14.1 mi (22.7 km)
B1030 (defunct)			Connected the now-gone Brightlingsea railway station with the B1029 in Brightlingsea town centre. Now a spur of the B1029.	
B1031 (defunct)	Pier Avenue (then A133) in Clacton-on-Sea	Clacton-on-Sea railway station	via Station Road; now unclassified.	
B1032	Clacton-on-Sea	Kirby Cross		
B1033	A133 at Weeley	Frinton-on-Sea		
B1034	B1033 southeast of Thorpe-le-Soken	Walton-on-the-Naze		
B1035	B1352 southeast of Manningtree	B1033 northwest of Thorpe-le-Soken	By way of Horsleycross Street, Horsley Cross, Tendring Green, Goose Green and Tendring	
B1036	west of Laindon	south of Laindon	Original route ran along West Street in Harwich from the A135 to the Quay; this is now part of the B1352 following road upgrades in the area.	
B1037	northeast of Stevenage	Cottered		
B1038	Buntingford	Newport, Essex		
B1039	Royston	Wendens Ambo		
B1040	Biggleswade	Crowland		
B1041	A1 Little Paxton	St Neots	Original route ran along The Baulk between the A1 (now A6001) and the B1040; this is now a spur of the B1040.	
B1042	Sandy	A1198 near Wimpole Lodge	Formerly a section of the A603 before it was downgraded to force traffic to use the A428 instead. The section along St Neots Road in Sandy was declassified in the 1990s.	
B1043	A1(M) at Alconbury	A1(M)/A15 at Norman Cross	Former portion of the A1. Number is out of zone (located in zone 6) due to rerouting of the A1.	
B1044	A141 northwest of Huntingdon	A1307/A1198 Godmanchester		
B1045 (defunct)	A132 (now A1307) in Cambridge	Cambridge railway station	Ran along Station Road in Cambridge; now declassified.	
B1046	Eynesbury	A603 near Barton	Originally ran along Lensfield Road, Gonville Place and East Road in Cambridge, connecting the A10 to the A45. Early on, the road was extended west over the newly built Fen Causeway to begin at the A603. Upgraded to the A1120 around 1932 and was renumbered as an eastern extension of the A603 itself in 1935. The western half is now part of the A1134 ring road.	
B1047	A1303 in Barnwell	A14 in Fen Ditton	Originally used in Cambridge from the B1046 (now A603) Gonville Place to the A10 Milton Road. Declassified because it was deemed to be too close to the centre of town to be used by traffic.	
B1048	St Neots	north of Eaton Ford	First used along Victoria Road in Cambridge, cutting the corner between the A132 (later A604) Huntingdon Road and the A10 Milton Road. Although the route was still B1048 in the 1970s, it has since been upgraded to a portion of the A1134 ring road. Next used from Old Harlow to Pinnacles as part of Harlow New Town. The section east of the Burnt Mill Roundabout became A1019 for a time in the 1970s, but is now the A414. The remainder is now part of the A1169.	
B1049	A1134 in Cambridge	A1123 at Wilburton		10.9 mi (17.5 km)
B1050	A14 at Bar Hill	A141 at Chatteris		17.2 mi (27.7 km)
B1051	Stansted Mountfitchet	Great Sampford		
B1052	B1061 near Burrough Green	Wendens Ambo		
B1053	Saffron Walden	A131 north of Braintree		
B1054	B1053 east of Radwinter	A1017		
B1055	B1053	B1054 at Hempstead		
B1056 (defunct)	B1054 in Steeple Bumpstead	B1057 in Steeple Bumpstead	Declassified.	
B1057	Great Dunmow	Haverhill		
B1058 (defunct)	A1017 in Sible Hedingham	A131	Declassified after the 1990s.	
B1059 (defunct)	Colchester	Sudbury	Upgraded early on to an extension of the A133, but later downgraded again to a portion of the B1508.	
B1059 (defunct)	A45 Upper Orwell Street in Ipswich	A45 Felixstowe Road in Ipswich	Much of route now an extension of the B1075 while the western end is part of the A1156 one-way system.	
B1060 (defunct)	Haverhill	Bury St Edmunds	Extended over the B1067, probably in 1935. The entire original section was renumbered as a southern extension of the A143 in the 1950s, leaving only the extension, which was later declassified due to road upgrades in the area.	
B1061	A1017 east of Haverhill	Newmarket		
B1062	A143 at Homersfield	Beccles	Originally ran along the River Stour from Baythorne End to Long Melford. Upgraded to the A1092 in the early 1920s.	
B1063	Clare	Newmarket		16.3 mi (26.2 km)
B1064	A131 north of Sudbury	A1092 north of Long Melford		
B1065	A1092 (Melford Road)	B1066 near Glemsford		
B1066	A143 south of Bury St Edmunds	A1092 north of Long Melford	by way of Whepstead, Brockley, Cross Green and Hartest	
B1067	Bramford	Ipswich	Originally used from the A45 to the A134 in Bury St Edmunds; renumbered as a portion of the B1060 in 1935. One section now A1302, the remainder is unclassified.	3 mi (4.8 km)
B1068	A134 at Leavenheath	A12 near East Bergholt		
B1069	A1152 at Rendlesham	B1078 at Tunstall	Originally used from the A134 near Newton to the A12 in Ipswich; this was upgraded to the A1071 in 1924. Parts of the route are now unclassified, including the entire section east of the current A14.	1.4 mi (2.3 km)
B1070	A137 at Cattawade near Manningtree	Hadleigh, Suffolk	The B1070 originally continued northwards from here towards Bury St Edmunds. This is now the A1141.	
B1071	A1141 at Lavenham	B1115 near Little Waldingfield		
B1072 (defunct)	Holbrook Hall	Bildeston	Renumbered as a portion of the B1115 in 1935; original multiplex with the B1070 through Monks Eleigh is now a multiplex with the A1141.	
B1072 (defunct)	Coates	Guyhirn	Intended as a more direct route between Whittlesey and Guyhirn; became a portion of the A605 in the 1960s when it was extended.	
B1073	B1098 near Christchurch, Cambridgeshire	A1101 at Welney		4.2 mi (6.8 km)
B1074	St Olaves	A1117 north-west of Lowestoft	Originally used from the A12 near Copdock to the A45 at Great Blankenham. Renumbered to A1100 early on; much of route now B1113, although the section immediately north of Copdock is unclassified.	
B1075	A1214 in Ipswich	A1156 in Ipswich		3.2 mi (5.1 km)
B1076	B1075 in Ipswich	A1156 in Ipswich		0.3 mi (0.48 km)
B1077	B1108 at Carbrooke	A1156 in Ipswich		43.6 mi (70.2 km)
B1078	Bildeston	B1084 northwest of Orford		
B1079	Helmingham Hall	Woodbridge		
B1080	A137 east of Brantham	B1456	Original route ran from the A12 in Martlesham to the then-A139 (now unclassified), bypassing Ipswich to the east. Renumbered to A1093 by 1928, but is now unclassified due to construction of the A12 bypass of Ipswich.	5.4 mi (8.7 km)
B1081	A1 near Tickencote	A1 near Carpenters Lodge	Old routing of A1 through Stamford. Originally connected the A139 to itself in Felixstowe, this became a portion of the A45 in 1935 when it was extended. Now part of the A154 due to upgrades in the area.	
B1082	A1021	A154	Originally ended at the seafront; later extended to the A154.	
B1083	A1152 at Woodbridge	Bawdsey	by way of Sutton, Shottisham and Alderton	
B1084	A1152 east of Woodbridge	Orford	by way of Butley and Chillesford	
B1085	B1063 north of Lidgate	B1102 east of Fordham		10.5 mi (16.9 km)
B1086	B1050 in Somersham	B1040	Former portion of A141.	
B1087	A134 west of Nayland	B1068 in Stoke-by-Nayland	Route into Nayland is former A134. The original B1087 ran from Haddenham to Witcham Toll, and was upgraded to Class I status in the early 1920s as the A1072. In 1935 it was renumbered as a spur of the A1123, but was later renumbered again to A1421.	
B1088 (defunct)	A10 in Ely	A142 in Ely	Declassified when the A142 was rerouted around Ely. Now part of C317 and C318.	
B1089	B1040 in Pidley	B1086 in Somersham	Originally ran along The Lane in Old Hurst, from B1040 to the A141. When the A141 was rerouted in 1935, the B1089 was extended along old A141 to the B1086 in Somersham. The section between Old Hurst and the rerouted B1040 was declassified when the A141 Old Hurst bypass was built.	0.9 mi (1.4 km)
B1090	B1043 near Sawtry	A1123 at Houghton	Originally was to the north of the current route, from the A1 near Glatton to the B1040 in Ramsey St Mary's. The number was moved to the current route in 1935, and the original route became part of the B660.	9.9 mi (15.9 km)
B1091	A15 in Yaxley	A605/A1139/B1092 in Stanground		3.5 mi (5.6 km)
B1092	A605/A1139/B1091 in Stanground	A605 at Horsey Hill	Original route was adjacent to the current one, from B1093 in Old Fletton to A605. The section east of the A15 is now part of the A1129 and the section west is unclassified.	1.2 mi (1.9 km)
B1093	A605 in Whittlesey	B1100	Section from Whittlesey to the A15 became a portion of the A605 in 1935.	21.1 mi (34.0 km)
B1094	B1098 on the bank of the Sixteen Foot Drain	A1122 in Nordelph	Original route ran along the northern section of Church Street in Whittlesey, from the B1093 (now A605) to the B1040. Renumbered as a spur of the B1040, probably in 1935 as the number was reused that year.	5.4 mi (8.7 km)
B1095	A605 near Stanground	B1040 at Pondersbridge		4.0 mi (6.4 km)
B1096	B1040 in Ramsey	B1093 in Benwick		5.7 mi (9.2 km)
B1097 (defunct)	B1040/B1093 in Whittlesey	A141 near March	The section from Whittlesey to just east of Coates is now part of an eastern extension of the A605, the remainder is unclassified.	
B1098	B1050 in Chatteris	A1101 at Three Holes		12.4 mi (20.0 km)
B1099	A141 near March	B1098	Route into March is former A141.	5.5 mi (8.9 km)
B1100	B1098 near Christchurch, Cambridgeshire	A1101 at Welney		4.2 mi (6.8 km)
B1101	A141 at Wimblington	A1101 at Elm	Section from March to Wimblington is former A141. Originally used from Bury St Edwards to Outwell. Due to its importance, it was upgraded to an A road with the same number in the early 1920s.	11.1 mi (17.9 km)
B1102	A1303 in Stow cum Quy, near Cambridge	A1101 in Mildenhall		17.5 mi (28.2 km)
B1103	B1102 in Burwell	A142 in Newmarket		4.5 mi (7.2 km)
B1104	B1382 in Prickwillow	B1085 at Chippenham	by way of Isleham Originally ran along Issacson Road in Burwell, cutting the corner between the B1102 and B1103. Renumbered as a spur of the B1102 in 1935.	9 mi (14 km)
B1105	Wells-next-the-Sea, Norfolk	Fakenham, Norfolk	Locally called the 'Dry Road', due to it being the only route in Norfolk not to have a pub on it. Originally the route went from Wells-next-the-Sea, through Wighton, Little Walsingham, Houghton St. Giles and East Barsham, on to Fakenham, but was re-classified with a parallel route circa 2002.	
B1106	Brandon, Suffolk	Bury St Edmunds, Suffolk		14.2 mi (22.9 km)
B1107	Brandon, Suffolk	Thetford, Norfolk		4.9 mi (7.9 km)
B1108	A1065 near Bodney	A147 in Norwich		29.1 mi (46.8 km)
B1109 (defunct)	A11 in Thetford	B1111 (now A1066)	Declassified.	
B1110	A148 at Holt, Norfolk	B1146 near Hoe	Originally carried on through Dereham and east along the old A47 towards Hockering	19 mi (31 km)
B1111	A143 in Stanton	A1075	Originally ran further north to the B1110, this section is now the A1075. Original route ran between Thetford and Diss, but when it was decided that the road between two of the main places in south Norfolk should be a Class I road, it was renumbered to A1066 in the early 1920s.	4.2 mi (6.8 km)
B1112	Stoke Ferry, Norfolk	Icklingham	Originally used between Woolpit and Thetford. It was decided to upgrade the route to Class I early on, so it became the A1088 in the early 1920s.	20.9 mi (33.6 km)
B1113	Sproughton	Norwich		
B1114 (defunct)	Stowmarket	B1115 in Ashfield Place	Renumbered as a portion of B1115 in 1935. The section west of Stonham Aspal became a portion of the A1120 in the 1950s and the remainder declassified as the A1120 found an east–west route avoiding Debenham. The western end was renumbered back to B1115 when the A1120 was clipped back to the A45 (now A14) Stowmarket bypass.	
B1114 (defunct)	B1111 north of Garboldisham	B1113 in Kenninghall	Declassified (along with a section of the B1113) in the 2000s.	
B1115	A131 at Sudbury	A1120 at Stowupland	Small spur section runs between Bildeston, Suffolk and the A1141 in Semer, Suffolk away from main route, serving as a Hadleigh-Bildeston Road.	
B1116	Lower Hacheston	Harleston		
B1117	A144 at Halesworth	A140 at Thornham Parva		21.3 mi (34.3 km)
B1118	B1116 Dennington	A140 south of Diss		
B1119	Leiston	Saxtead Green		
B1120	Framlingham	Badingham		
B1121	A12 in Kelsale (near Saxmundham)	A1094 near Friston		
B1122	A12 near Yoxford	A1094 in Aldeburgh		
B1123	B1116 near Harleston	A145 near Blythburgh		
B1124	B1123 in Halesworth	A145 in Brampton		
B1125	B1122 near Theberton	A12 in Blythburgh	Originally used from Blythburgh to Brampton. Renumbered as a southern extension of the A145 in the early 1930s.	
B1126	A12 in Wangford	A1095 in Reydon		
B1127	A1095 in Reydon	A146 near Worlingham		
B1128 (defunct)	A146 in Beccles	Beccles railway station	Became a portion of the A145 when it was extended.	
B1129 (defunct)	A146 at Oulton Broad	A12 near Blundeston	Due to its importance, it was upgraded to Class I status as the A1117 in the 1930s. Due to road improvements, much of the route is now the B1375 with only the southernmost section still numbered as A1117.	
B1130 (defunct)	B1129 (now A1117) in Oulton Broad	A12 in Lowestoft	Was the easternmost Class II road in the UK; upgraded to Class I status as the A1144 in the 1960s. The westernmost section is now part of a rerouted A1117.	
B1131	B1188 near Canwick	A15 in Bracebridge Heath	Originally used from the A143 east of Diss to the B1105 (now A1065) on the southern edge of Swaffam. The section east of Diss was renumbered as the eastern end of the A1066 in the early 1920s and the remainder to the B1077 in 1935.	1.4 mi (2.3 km)
B1132 (defunct)	B1111 in Roydon	B1131 in Diss	Became a loop off the A1066 in the 1920s and swapped with the A1066 in the 1970s. Declassified in the 2000s.	
B1133	B181 near Broadley Common	A1169 in Great Parndon	Originally used along Denmark Street in Diss; this is now part of the B1077.	
B1134	B1077 between Short Green and New Buckenham	A143 near Redenhall		
B1135	A47 in East Dereham	B1113 near Wymondham	Originally continued to Woodton; much of this section is now unclassified although the eastern end is now the B1527.	
B1136	Hales, A146, Close to Loddon	Haddiscoe, A143	Norfolk	
B1137	A12 in Hatfield Peverel	A1099 in Chelmsford	Formerly A12 before construction of 3-lane dual carriageway. Originally used along St Giles Street and London Street in Norwich, linking the A1024 to the A47. Declassified (probably in the 1970s) when the present ring road was completed, which declassified all roads within. The section along London Street is now pedestrianized.	
B1138 (defunct)	A147 in Norwich	A1024 in Norwich	Declassified in the 1920s when the A1024 was extended clockwise, bypassing the B1138. The southernmost section is now part of the A147 inner ring road; the remainder remains unclassified.	
B1138 (defunct)	A149 in Great Yarmouth	B1143 in Great Yarmouth	Declassified sometime after the 1990s.	
B1139 (defunct)	St Martin's Road in Norwich	Riverside Road in Norwich	Bypassed Norwich to the north and east. The section along Bakers Road was declassified in the 1920s along with the B1138. The remainder was upgraded to the A1067 in the 1960s to form part of the Norwich Inner Ring Road (now A147). The western section of Bull Close Road is now part of the A1151.	
B1140	A1151 at Wroxham	Cantley	Number previously assigned to a secondary route between Norwich and Reedham via Acle, known as the Acle Straight. Reclassified as the A1096 in 1927 and upgraded to the A47 in 1935. A section of the old route within Norwich remains numbered as the B1140.	
B1141	A1243 in Great Yarmouth	A1243 in Great Yarmouth	Although the termini are just under a quarter of a mile apart, the route is six times that distance in length.	
B1142 (defunct)	Beccles Road in Gorleston	Quay Road in Gorleston	The western section became a portion of a rerouted A12 (now B1370) before WWII and the eastern section was declassified in the 1990s.	
B1143 (defunct)	South Quay (A1243)	A12/A47 in Great Yarmouth	Declassified.	
B1144	A148 (London Road in King's Lynn)	A148 between King's Lynn and Gaywood		
B1145	A149 at King's Lynn	Mundesley		
B1146	Fakenham	A47 near Dereham	Has 3 ending in Fakenham, at the A1065 Hempton, the A1065/A148 roundabout and the A1067 Pensthorpe Road roundabout	13.2 mi (21.2 km)
B1147 (defunct)	A47 near Dereham	A1067 near Bawdeswell	Downgraded to Class III as the C888 in 2015.	
B1148 (defunct)	A147 (now A1402) near Norwich	A148 in Fakenham	Upgraded to Class I status very early on due to its importance, and is now the A1067.	
B1148 (defunct)	A151 in Spalding	B1165 in Spalding	Became a spur of the B1165 in 1935, but declassified in the 2000s following the construction of the A16 Spalding bypass.	
B1148 (defunct)	A148 in King's Lynn	A1078 in King's Lynn	Declassified sometime after the 2000s.	
B1149	A148, Holt	A1270, north of Norwich	The only direct route between Norwich and Holt, previously connected with the A140 near Norwich Airport before the construction of the A1270 Northern Distributor Road	
B1150	A1151 at Norwich	A149 at North Walsham	Previously continued beyond North Walsham to Bacton	
B1151 (defunct)	B1150 in Norwich	A149 in Smallburgh	Upgraded to Class I status in 1935, keeping the same number.	
B1151 (defunct)	A149 in Stalham	B1159 in Ingham	Declassified in the 2000s when the section of B1159 it connected to was also declassified.	
B1152	A1064 in Billockby	A149 in Bastwick	Splits near Billockby; route to Bastwick is the original 1922 route, other branch was created in 1935 and also meets the A149, but further south and a shorter distance. Before the 2000s, it continued to the now-declassified B1159.	
B1153	A47 north of Narborough	A149 in Brancaster	Originally was Hillington to Docking; extended on both ends in the 1920s.	
B1154 (defunct)	A149 near Heacham	A148 at Sculthorpe	Upgraded early on to a portion of the A1067. But during WWII, the eastern end was erased when RAF Sculthorpe was built (the junction between the A148 and B1154 is now gone, lost under the runway) and a new route was built across Syderstone Common in the 1960s. The northern section was downgraded to the B1454 a few years later.	
B1154 (defunct)	A148 in King's Lynn	A148 in King's Lynn	Loop off A148 to serve King's Lynn railway station; now part of the A148 one-way loop in the town centre.	
B1155	B1153 Docking Road/Snettisham Road in Great Bircham	A149 at Holkham	The road splits in Stanhoe, a branch leading to Docking and one to Great Bircham	
B1156	A149 at Blakeney	A148 at Sharrington	Links A148 inland to the A149 coast road	5 mi (8.0 km)
B1157 (defunct)	Sheringham	A148 above Upper Sheringham	Section north of the A148 gone by the mid-1970s and remainder declassified in the 2000s.	
B1157 (defunct)	East Dereham	Etling Green	Number reserved for the section of old A47 through East Dereham after the bypass opened, but the number was never used. The B1146 and B1147 were extended over the route instead.	
B1158 (defunct)	A148 near Sheringwood	B1157 in Sheringham	Originally existed only north of the A149 and was extended to the A148 in 1935. This extension was upgraded to the A1082 in the early 1970s with the original route declassified.	
B1159	A149 near Stalham, Norfolk	Paston, Norfolk	Formerly the number assigned to the Norfolk coastal road between Cromer and Great Yarmouth much of which is now downgraded to a C-road.	7.5 mi (12.1 km)
B1160	A10	Roundabout at the A134	Original route ran from B1145 and B1159 in Mundesley; half the route became B1159 in the early 1930s. A map from 1936 shows the route as a spur of the B1145, though it could have been declassified earlier. Entire route now declassified.	
B1161	A149 in Hunstanton	A149 in Hunstanton	Loop off A149	
B1162	Roundabout on the A15 in Lincolnshire near Northborough	Deeping St James		
B1163 (defunct)	A16 (now B1525) in Deeping St James	B1040 in Crowland	Became a westward extension of the B1166 in 1935.	
B1163 (defunct)	Brimsdown railway station	A110	Renumbered to A1055.	
B1164	Markham Moor Roundabout on the A1	Carlton-on-Trent	Used to be part of the A1 until the current A1 highway was built. Number is out-of-zone (located in Zone 6) due to rerouting of the A1. Originally used along Broadgate Lane in Deeping St James. Renumbered as a portion of the B1162, probably in 1935.	
B1165	Spalding	A1101 in Cambridgeshire	Originally used as the direct route from Eye to Crowland. Due to its importance early on, it was upgraded to a portion of the A1073 in the 1920s, but was declassified in 2011 due to completion of the parallel A16.	
B1166	B1169 at Leverington Common	B1525 at Market Deeping		22.3 mi (35.9 km)
B1167	Thorney	B1166 near Throckenholt	The part through Thorney used to be part of the A47 before the village was bypassed.	
B1168	Holbeach	Holbeach Drove		
B1169	B1166	A1101 near Wisbech		
B1170 (defunct)	Wisbech East railway station	A47 (now A1101) in Wisbech	Declassified by 1968.	
B1171 (defunct)	A141 (now A47) in Wisbech	B1170 in Wisbech	Downgraded to Class III status as the C28 by 1968.	
B1172 (defunct)	North End in Wisbech	Leverington Road in Wisbech	Renumbered as a portion of the A1101 mainline in the 1960s.	
B1172	A roundabout on the A16 north of Spalding	A roundabout on the A16 south of Spalding	Used to be part of the A16 through Spalding until the bypass was built. – Duplicated number see next	
B1172	Junction with the A11 at Suton south of Wymondham	Junction with the A11 and A47 at Thickthorn, south of Norwich	Used to be part of the A11 through Wymondham and Hethersett until the bypass was built. – Duplicated number see previous.	8.8 mi (14.2 km)
B1173	Spalding	A roundabout with the A16 and A1073	Used to be the northern part of the A1073 until the A16 bypass was built. Originally used from Wisback to Walsoken. Now the C311.	
B1174	A roundabout on the A1 north of Grantham	Merges with the A1 at Little Ponton	Used to be part of the A1 through Granthan before the bypass was built.	
B1175 (defunct)	A16 in Spalding	A1 in Colsterworth	Section from Colsterworth to the new A1 renumbered as a portion of the B676 when Colsterworth was bypassed in the 1920s. The section east of the A15 was upgraded to a section of the A151 in the early 1930s and the remainder from the A1 to the A15 also became a portion of the B676 in 1935. Except for a small section west of the A1 Colsterworth bypass, the entire route is now part of the A151, although it now bypasses Bourne with the original route through Bourne becoming the B1193.	
B1176	A6121 in Ryhall	Roundabout on the A52/B6403 east of Grantham		
B1177	A15 near Haconby	A52 at Bridge End		
B1178	Harmston	Potterhanworth		
B1179 (defunct)	New Road in Spalding	Bridge Street in Spalding	Connected the A16 with itself; declassified sometime after the 1960s.	
B1180	Pinchbeck	Pinchbeck West	Originally used between Donington and Swineshead and was part of one of the possible routes between Grantham and Boston. It was decided early on that the road was important enough to be upgraded to Class I status, so it became the A1075 in the 1920s, then an extension of the A154 in 1935 and finally part of an extended A52 after World War II, although much of the route has since been bypassed.	
B1181	Bicker	Drayton		
B1182	A15 near Lincoln	A46 near Lincoln	Former A46 and A1102; original route ran from West Street to High Street in Boston; this is now the A52 relief road. The eastern section was declassified and has been cut off from the remainder of the road.	
B1183	Boston	Horncastle		
B1184	Old Leake	B1192 in Lincolnshire		
B1185 (defunct)	A17/A1 in Newark-on-Trent	North Gate	Declassified, probably when the A46 Western Bypass opened.	
B1186 (defunct)	A46 (now B6166) near Newark-on-Trent	A156 in Torksey Lock	Upgraded to Class I status as the A1133 in the late 1960s; the southern end was split by the A1 Newark bypass.	
B1187	A47 in Guyhirn	B1166	Originally used from Beckingham to Crowle. Upgraded to Class I status as an extension of the A161 in the early 1930s.	
B1188	Lincoln	A153 between Ruskington and Sleaford		
B1189	Metheringham	Billinghay		
B1190	A57 near Saxilby in Lincolnshire	Horncastle		
B1191	A15 north of Sleaford, Lincolnshire	A158 in Horncastle, Lincolnshire		
B1192	B1191 at Woodhall Spa	B1397 at Kirton, Lincolnshire		20 mi (32 km)
B1193	A151 in Bourne	A151 in Bourne	Former routing of the A151. Originally used from Newland to Newport. Due to its importance, it was upgraded to Class I status as a portion of the A1102 Lincoln bypass, but was downgraded back to Class II as the B1273 following the construction of the A46 bypass. The number was also assigned to St Mary's Street between the-then A15 and B1188 (now A15). This road was not classified until the mid-1920s, so it is unknown if the two routes existed concurrently or was allocated afterwards. This B1193 was renumbered to A1190 when the A15 was rerouted, later becoming the eastern section of the A57 and is currently the B199.	
B1194 (defunct)	A15 in Lincoln	A157 in Lincoln	Declassified, possibly when the A15 was rerouted over the western section of the A157 to avoid the center of Lincoln.	
B1195	A158 east of High Toynton, Lincolnshire	Wainfleet All Saints		
B1196	Alford	A roundabout with the A158 and A1028 west of Gunby		
B1197	Hertford, Hertfordshire	A1170 in Hoddesdon, Hertfordshire	The London Road south from Hertford, so called as it provided the main link with the A10 to London. Formerly designated as part of the A602, it was renumbered with the opening of the current A10 route in the late 1970s.	
B1197 (defunct)	A16/A1028 in Ulseby Cross	B1196 in Alford	Upgraded to the A1104 in the early 1920s when Mabelthorpe needed a Class I road.	
B1197 (defunct)	A1104 near Alford	B1198 (later A154, now A52)	Upgraded to the A1111 in the 1960s.	
B1198	A177 in Shincliffe	A181 in Sherburn	Former section of A180. Out-of-zone in County Durham because the original A1 (now the A167), not the A1(M), forms the zone boundary. Original route ran along the Lincolnshire coast from Old Clee to Skegness. The northern section was renumbered A1098 and B1401 (now A1031) in the early 1920s. The route south of Mabelthorpe became the A154 (later A52) by 1932; the remainder disappeared after WWII when it was renumbered as an extensive southern extension of the A1031.	
B1199 (defunct)	A1084? in Brigg	A1084 in Brigg	Possibly connected the A1084 to itself; declassified in 1922, probably following construction of the present A18 bypass.	
B1199 (defunct)	B1196 west of Beesby	B1198 (now A52) southwest of Mabelthorpe	Upgraded to a portion of the A1104 in 1925 to give Mablethorpe a Class I road.	
B1200	A157/A16 west of Louth	A1031 in Saltfleetby	Until the opening of the Louth bypass in 1991, the B1200 started at Kenwick Top, south of Louth, where the A16, A157 and B1520 now meet.	
B1201	A16 at North Thoresby	A1031 south of Tetney		2.4 mi (3.9 km)
B1202	Boothby Graffoe	Market Rasen		
B1203	Grimsby	Market Rasen		
B1204	Elsham	South Ferriby	Originally linked the A631 to the A46, allowing traffic to avoid Market Rasen. Due to its importance, it was upgraded to Class I status as the A1103 in the early 1920s.	
B1205	Blyton	Nettleton		
B1206	B1205 just outside Kirton in Lindsey	New Holland	The part from Redbourne to New Holland used to be the northern part of the A15 before the current A15 was built.	
B1207	B1206 at Hibaldstow	A1077 near Winteringham		12.1 mi (19.5 km)
B1208	Brigg	B1207 north of Broughton		
B1209	A15 near Leasingham	A153 at Leasingham Moor	Original route ran from A15 (now A18) in Brigg to then-A46 in Caistor. Upgraded to Class I status, becoming the A1084 by 1926.	
B1210	Grimsby	Kirmington		
B1211	Keelby	A18 east of Melton Ross, North Lincolnshire		
B1212	B1213 near Grimsby town centre	B1444 in the suburbs of Grimsby		
B1213	Roundabout with the A16 and A180 near Grimsby Docks	A46 in the suburbs of Cleethorpes		
B1214 (defunct)	A16 (now A1243) in Grimsby	A16 in Grimsby	Connected the A16 to itself; declassified sometime after the 1990s.	
B1215 (defunct)	B1214 in Grimsby	A16 in Grimsby	Still had Class II status in the 1990s (may or may not have had the B1215 number), but was declassified sometime after that.	
B1216	A1077 outside Scunthorpe	Gunness		
B1217	M1 J47	Towton	Westernmost section was part of the A642 until the M1 link was built, putting the number out-of-zone. Originally used from Scunthorpe to Barton-upon-Humber. Due to its importance, it was upgraded to Class I status as the A1077 in the early 1920s. Some sections are now parts of the A1029, B1207 and B1430.	
B1218	An interchange with the A15 and B1206	Barton-upon-Humber		
B1219	Waltham	Humberston	Originally used from Barton-upon-Humber to Barrow-upon-Humber. Early on, it was decided that the route was important enough to be upgraded to Class I status, so it became part of the A1077 in the early 1920s.	
B1220	A638 near Woodlands	A1 in Skellow		
B1221 (defunct)	A1 at Ferrybridge	A645 in Knottingley	Renumbered as an eastern extension of the B6136.	
B1221 (defunct)	A174 (now B1380) in Ormesby	A171 in Ormesby	Former route of the A171; now unclassified.	
B1222	Fulford	A63 near Garforth		
B1223	A19 at Selby	A162 near Towton		11.2 mi (18.0 km)
B1224	Wetherby	York	Out-of-zone in County Durham because the old A1 (now the A167), not the A1(M), forms the zone boundary.	
B1225	Baumber	Caistor	Originally used between the A64/A66 and A1036 in York. Much of route now unclassified and pedestrianized (as it was in York city centre), however the section over the Ouse Bridge is part of the B1227.	
B1226	A15/A46 north of Lincoln	B1273 in Lincoln	Formerly a portion of A15 before the A15 Lincoln bypass was built. Original route ran from A19 to the A64 in York, which has since been declassified and pedestrianized as it was in York city centre.	
B1227	Rougier Street, York	Tower Street, York	Route intersects the A1036 at either end as it loops around York city centre.	
B1228	A64/A1079 near York	Boothferry, East Riding of Yorkshire		
B1229	A165 near Reighton, North Yorkshire	Ends in Flamborough, East Riding of Yorkshire	Originally allocated to the direct route between Howden and Holme-on-Spalding-Moor. Became a portion of the A1041 (now A614).	
B1230	Howden	Beverley	The section from Howden to the M62 was originally part of the A63.	
B1231	Kingston upon Hull	North Ferriby		
B1232	A164 north of Willerby	A1105 at Hessle		
B1233	A164 at Skidby	A1079/A1165 in Kingston upon Hull		
B1234 (defunct)	Hull docks	Carr Lane (likely the A63) in Hull	Declassified in the 1970s; the northernmost section is now gone, with a department store built on the site. Another section was wiped out by the A63/A1079 interchange.	
B1235 (defunct)	A63 in Hull	A165 in Hull	Renumbered to A1163 in the 1970s; the Brook Street section was upgraded to the A1079 and the eastern section of George Street along with North Bridge and Witham are now part of the A165.	
B1236 (defunct)	Queen Victoria Square in Hull	B1235 in Hull	Declassified and pedestrianized sometime after the 1980s.	
B1237	A1033 Stoneferry	A165 through Sutton on Hull		3.1 mi (5 km)
B1238	A165 near Bilton, East Riding of Yorkshire	B1242 at Aldbrough, East Riding of Yorkshire		7.9 mi (12.7 km)
B1239	Bilton, East Riding of Yorkshire	Preston, East Riding of Yorkshire		
B1240	Sproatley, East Riding of Yorkshire	Thorngumbald, East Riding of Yorkshire		
B1241	Lea	Saxilby	Originally allocated to a route from the A1033/B1240/B1241 in Hedon to the B1242 in Patrington; became part of an extended A1033 in the early 1920s. The western end became part of the B1240 when Hedon was bypassed.	
B1242	Withernsea	Lissett		
B1243	Skirlaugh	Sigglesthorne		
B1244 (defunct?)	Hornsea	A165 at Leven, East Riding of Yorkshire	May or may not still exist; the section east of the Leven roundabout became part of the A1035 in 2013.	
B1245 (defunct)	crosswords in Leven	Hornsea Road in Leven	Declassified (along with the westernmost section of the B1244) in 1994 when the A165 Leven bypass opened.	
B1246	Barmby Moor	A614 north of Bainton, East Riding of Yorkshire		
B1247	A1079	Pocklington		
B1248	A64 near Malton	A1035 near Cherry Burton	Passes through Norton-on-Derwent, North Grimston, Wharram-le-Street, Wetwang, Tibthorpe, Bainton	27.1 mi (43.6 km)
B1249	Skipsea	A64 at Staxton		
B1250 (defunct)	B1249 in Great Driffield	A166 in Great Driffield	Decommissioned in 1983.	
B1251	Fridaythorpe	Sledmere		
B1252	Garton on the Wolds	Sledmere		
B1253	Bridlington	B1248 near North Grimston		
B1254	Bridlington town centre	B1255 in the suburbs of Bridlington.		
B1255	Bridlington	Flamborough north landing.		
B1256	Braintree	M11 J8 near Bishop's Stortford	First used on a route between the A19 in Thirsk and the A169 in Pickering. This became a portion of the A170 in the 1920s. The second use was the northern bypass of Darlington. Upgraded to Class I status as the A1150 in the 1960s.	
B1257	Stokesley	Malton		
B1258	A64 near West Knapton, North Yorkshire	Snainton		
B1259	Flamborough	Flamborough Head	Originally used from the A165 on the edge of Muston to the B1260 in Filey. It was decided that Filey town centre needed a Class I road, so the B1259 (and B1260) became an eastern extension of the A1039 in the 1920s.	
B1260	B1284 at Rainton Bridge, Houghton-le-Spring	B1404 at New Town, Houghton-le-Spring	Originally used from the A165 on the eastern edge of Gristhorpe to Filey. In the early 1920s it was decided that Filey needed a link to the Class I road network, so the B1260, along with the B1259, was renumbered as an eastern extension of the A1039.	1 mi (1.6 km)
B1261	East Ayton	Lebberston	Section through Seamer originally part of the A64.	
B1262 (defunct)	A64 Westborough in Scarbrough	A171 in Burniston	Due to its importance, it was upgraded to Class I status as a northern extension of the A165 in the early 1920s; the southern end is now the B1364.	
B1262 (defunct)	A171 in Scarborough	A170 in East Ayton	Former routing of the A170, which was rerouted in 1922 along the then-B1261 to meet the A64 in Seamer. But in the 1970s, the changes were reversed: the B1262 returned to the A170 and the East Ayton to Seamer road returned to the B1261.	
B1262 (defunct)	A57 (now B199) Wigford Way / St Mary's Street	A1434 St Catherine's	Originally the A15 southern approach to Lincoln; declassified in 2017.	
B1263	Scorton	Low Entercommon	Formerly the B6273 before the A1 was rerouted. Originally used from Northallerton to Osmotherley. Renumbered as an eastern extension of the A684 in 1924 when the A1 through Northallerton was renumbered to the A167.	
B1264	A167 near Great Smeaton	Yarm		
B1265	B1264 (Yarm)	A67 (Yarm)		
B1266	A171 Newton Mulgrave Moor	A174 north of Mickleby	Originally used from Brotton to Whitby. Became a portion of an extended A174 in 1935.	
B1267 (defunct)	A173 in Skelton	A174 south of Marske-by-the-Sea	Upgraded to Class I status as portions of the A173 and A174 in 2000 when the Skelton/Saltburn/Brotton bypass was built.	
B1268	A173 at Upleatham Bridge	A174 at Corngrave	Originally continued to Saltburn, but this section became part of the A174 in 2000. Remainder possibly downgraded to a C road (although OS maps still show it as a Class B road west of the Four Lanes End junction) sometime after 2009.	
B1269	Near Guisborough	Redcar		
B1270 (defunct)	Westbourne Grove in North Ormesby	Smeaton Street in North Ormesby	Declassified.	
B1271 (defunct)	A176 in Middlesbrough	A171 in Middlesbrough	Extended west to the A174 and east to the A171; the western extension became the A1130 (now A1032) in 1935 and was later clipped back to the B1272 with a small section becoming part of the B1272; remainder has since been declassified.	
B1272	B6541 in Middlesbrough	A66		
B1273	A57 Carholme Road	B1182 Nettleham Road	Continued south along Brayford Way to the B1003 (now A1192) Tritton Road until 2017 when the A57 was diverted along this section. Number originally allocated to a road east of Darlington from the A67 to the A19 (now A135). Renumbered to A67 in the 1960s; the westernmost section is now the B6280.	
B1274	A177 in Roseworth, Stockton-on-Tees	A139 in Stockton-on-Tees		
B1275	A1027 near Billingham	A1046 in Haverton Hill	Originally routed along Chiltons Avenue, but was rerouted to the north in the 1920s after an industrial site was built.	
B1276	A689 in Owton Manor, Hartlepool	A178		
B1277	B1376 in Hartlepool	A178 in Graythorp	Originally a link between the A179 and A689 but has since been extended at both ends.	
B1278	Sedgefield	Near Wheatley Hill		
B1279	A181 west of Thornley	B1280	Parallels the A181 for much of its length.	
B1280	A19 in Sheraton	A182 in South Hetton		
B1281	A19 west of Castle Eden	A1086 in Blackhall Colliery		
B1282 (defunct)	Quarryheads Lane in Durham	A1050 (now A77) in Durham	Declassified; unknown why this number was chosen.	
B1283	A181 at Sherburn, County Durham	A1086 at Horden		10.1 mi (16.3 km)
B1284	Chester-le-Street Chilton Moor	Woodstone Village Hetton-le-Hole	Merged with A1052 between Woodstone Village and Chilton Moor. Continues as B1285. Out-of-zone due to the original A1 (now the A167), not the A1(M), forming the zone boundary.	
B1285	Hetton-le-Hole	Seaham		
B1286	Ryhope	Philadelphia		
B1287	Seaham	Murton		
B1288	A167 in Birtley	A184 in Wardley		
B1289 (defunct)	B1288 south of Springwell	A19 (now A1018) in Monkwearmouth	Decommissioned due to the parallel A1231. Now the A1290, C508, C551, B1291 and C552.	
B1290 (defunct)	B1289 in Southwick	A183 in Bishopwearmouth	Upgraded to Class I status as the A1231, although the section over the Queen Alexandra Bridge is now the B1539.	
B1291	Southwick	Seaburn		
B1292	A172	A173 near Great Ayton	Originally allocated to a route from the A19 (now the A1018) to the Sunderland docks; became a portion of A183 when the Durham Coast Road was built. Part of the route is now unclassified and the remainder now gone.	
B1293	A1231 at Sunderland	Hudson Dock		
B1294	A1018 at Sunderland	Extension Road, Sunderland		
B1295 (defunct)	A183 in Bishopwearmouth	Ryhope Road in Sunderland	Much of the Stockton Road section became part of the A1231 (the southern end is part of a gyratory) and the remainder was declassified.	
B1295 (defunct)	A1/A167 at Eighton Lodge	B1296 in Wrekenton	Now a spur of the B1296.	
B1296	A1 in Low Eighton	A167 in Gateshead	Originally allocated to a route east of Gateshead from the A1 to the A184 in Heworth, now unclassified. The new B1296 actually crosses the old B1296.	
B1297	A185 in Hebburn	A185 in Jarrow	Splits in Jarrow to serve the northern and southern sides of town.	
B1298	South Shields	Roundabout just east of Testos Roundabout (A19), joining A184		
B1299	Whitburn, Tyne and Wear	East Boldon	Middle section intersected by A1018 (Sunderland Road)	
B1300 (defunct)	A185 in South Shields	A19 in South Shields	Became part of an extension of the B1301 by 1932.	
B1300 (defunct)	A185 (now A194) near the Tyne Dock	A183 above Marsden Bay	Eastern half now part of the A1300 and the remainder unclassified.	
B1301	South Shields	A1300 at Marsden		2.8 mi (4.5 km)
B1302	A194 at Tyne Dock	Harton Road	Hudson Street, Boldon Lane,	0.6 mi (0.97 km)
B1303	A194 at South Shields	B1344	Part of Station Road	0.2 miles (0.32 km)
B1304	A192 near A1058 junction	A193 at North Shields	Originally used from the Swing Bridge at the-then A184 to the A186; may have been renumbered B6634 in 1928 because it was out-of-zone due to rerouting of the A1. Became part of the B1600 in the 1980s.	1.0 mi (1.6 km)
B1305	West Road A186	Scotswood Road A695	Condercum Road, Atkinson Road, Whitehouse Road Originally used along Quayside in Newcastle upon Tyne. Now unclassified.	0.9 mi (1.4 km)
B1306	A194 near Fellgate	A185 south of Hebburn	Mill Lane Originally used along Market Street in Newcastle upon Tyne. In 1929, the B1306 was put out-of-zone due to rerouting of the A1, so it was renumbered to B6440. The route is now pedestrianized. Next used on a route from Hebburn to Hebburn Colliery. It is not known when the route received its number due to its short length, but it was in existence by the late 1940s. Became a portion of the B1297 in the 1970s when it was routed away from Jarrow, but was declassified when the B1297 was rerouted back to Jarrow.	1.0 mi (1.6 km)
B1307	A184 at Gateshead	A1058 at Newcastle upon Tyne	Percy Street, St Mary's Place, Sandyford Road	1.2 mi (1.9 km)
B1308	Wragby Road A1434	B1273	Originally used in Newcastle upon Tyne from the A186 to the A695. Became part of the B1600 in the 1980s.	
B1309	A167(M)/A193 junction	John Dobson Street	Formerly ran between West Jesmond and Newcastle upon Tyne. Became part of the B1600 in the 1980s.	0.2 mi (0.32 km)
B1310 (defunct)	A1 (now B1318) Great North Road	B1309 (now B1600)	Ran along Clayton Road in Newcastle upon Tyne; now declassified.	
B1311	A191 near Denton Burn	A186 Westgate Road	Originally ran along Cut Bank and Byker Bank east of Newcastle upon Tyne city centre. Became part of a rerouted B1312 following completion of the A193 Byker bypass.	1.3 mi (2.1 km)
B1312	A188/A193 in Byker	A193 in Byker	Originally ran along Raby Street in Byker; now unclassified.	
B1313	B1312 in Byker	A186 in Walker		
B1314	B1313 at Welbeck Road	A186 at St Anthony's		
B1315	A193 in Wallsend	A193 in Howdon		
B1316	A191 Rake Lane	A1058/A1108		
B1317	B1322 in Backworth	B1505 in Forest Hall		
B1318	B1307 in Newcastle upon Tyne	A19/A1068 at Seaton Burn	Former routing of the A1. Originally ran from the A191 in Benton Square to the A1060 (later A188) in West Moor. After World War II the route was extended along a section of the B1319 and all of the B1320 to the A1 at Wide Open. In the 1960s, the western section was split by an upgraded A189, the section along the former B1320 was upgraded to the A1056 and the original section of the B1318 became part of the B1505.	
B1319	A1171 in Dudley	A189/A1056 north of Killingworth	Section running south to West Moor became the B1318 after World War II (since been bypassed by the new A189) and the section from Dudley to Cramlington is now the A1171.	
B1320	A19 at Peterlee Roundabout	A1086 Coast Road	Originally used from Wide Open to Killingworth. Renumbered as a westward expansion of the B1318 after World War II and has since been upgraded to a portion of the A1056.	
B1321	A189/A190	B1318 Bridge Street/Front Street		2.1 mi (3.4 km)
B1322	A191	A190 Annitsford Road/Main Street South		3.2 mi (5.1 km)
B1323 (defunct)	A193 in Whitley Bay	A192 in Monkseaton	Declassified in the 1980s.	
B1324 (defunct)	B1323 in Monkseaton	A193 in Whitley Sands	Declassified in the 1980s, although the eastern end is now part of the A193.	
B1325	A192 at Earsdon, Tyne and Wear	A193 at Hartley, Northumberland		2.5 mi (4.0 km)
B1326	A1171 in Cramlington	A192 northwest of Seaton Delaval	by way of East Cramlington	
B1327	B1328 Bridge Street	B1523 Plessey Road A193 Broadway/Rotary Way		0.7 mi (1.1 km)
B1328	B1329/Quay Road junction	A193 Renwick Road		0.5 mi (0.80 km)
B1329	A193 outside Blyth	A193 in northern Blyth	From the south to the north end of Blyth	2.4 mi (3.9 km)
B1330	A1068 in Red Row	B6345 in Togston	Former portion of the A1068. Originally ran from the A194 (now A193) in Bebside to the A196 in Stakeford. The southern section was declassified in 1961 due to completion of the Kitty Brewster Bridge over the River Blyth east of the Furnace Bridge, and the B1330 was moved onto this route to Bedington Station. In 1970 or 1971 the route was extended north to Stakeford Road. The route over the bridge was renumbered to A189 in 1975; the remainder was upgraded to Class I status as the A1147.	
B1331	A192 west of Bedlington, Northumberland	A189 east of Bedlington	passes through Bedlington	
B1332	A146 at Trowse south-east of Norwich	A143 at Ditchingham	formerly numbered as part of the A144 north of Bungay	
B1333	A168 Thirsk Road	A167 South Parade/East Road	Northallerton High Street Originally used from Guide Post to Ashington. Upgraded to Class I status as the A1078 and became part of a southern extension of the A1068 after World War II.	
B1334	A197 Woodhorn Lane in Newbiggin-by-the-Sea	A196 Newbiggin Road/North Seaton Road		
B1335	A1306 at Rainham	B186 at South Ockendon	Two sections linked by the A1306. Originally used from Hirst to Newbiggin-by-the-Sea. Upgraded to an eastern extension of the A197 in the 1920s.	4.6 mi (7.4 km)
B1336	B1033 in Frinton-on-Sea	B1034 in Walton-on-the-Naze	Originally used from Ashington to Widdington. Upgraded to Class I status as a portion of the A1068 in the 1920s; the final mile of the route into Widdington was bypassed by the A1068 and is now gone, converted to fields.	
B1337	A197/Morpeth Northern Bypass junction	A1068		
B1338	Northumberland Street, Alnmouth	A1068		
B1339	B1340 Lamberts's Lane	A1068		
B1340	Bondgate Without B6346, Alnwick Town Centre	B1341 Front Street/B1342 Church Street, in Bamburgh		
B1341	A1 between Adderstone and Warenford	Front Street B1340/Church Street B1342		
B1342	A1 near B6349	Front Street B1340/B1341		
B1343	B1347, near B1377	A6137 near Ballencriff	Originally used from Burnmouth to Eyemouth. Renumbered to the A1107 by 1932; most of the southern section was declassified in the 1970s when the A1107 was rerouted.	
B1344	A183 Sea Road	ASDA South Shields Superstore/B1303	Originally used from Reston to St Abbs. One section was upgraded to a portion of the A1107 by 1932 while the remainder was renumbered as an extension of the B6438 in 1935.	
B1345	B1377 in Drem	A198 in Dirleton	Originally used as a loop north off of the A1 to serve Dunbar. It was decided early on to link Dunbar to the Class I road network, so the route was renumbered as the A1087 before 1927.	
B1346	Loop off A198 in North Berwick			
B1347	A198 in North Berwick	A199 opposite A1		
B1348	A199/B6454	A198 near Longniddery		
B1349	B1348 High Street	B1361 Gardiner Terrace		
B1350	A1 in Edinburgh	A900 in Edinburgh	Anomalously numbered: this part of London Road is wholly within Zone 9	
B1351	Stansted Mountfitchet	B1383, Stansted Mountfitchet		
B1352	A137 at Lawford	A120 at Harwich		12.6 miles (20.3 km)
B1353	B1069 Leiston Road	The Sanctuary, Thorpeness	Originally used from Farnham to Friston. Unclassified in 1922 and quickly upgraded to Class II in 1924. But this was short-lived, as it was upgraded to Class I as the A1094 by 1927.	
B1354	A148 at Thursford	B1149 at Saxthorpe, then restarts at A140 Hainford and finishes at A1151 Hoveton	Road has been re-routed since Saxthorpe/Corpusty by-pass construction	
B1355	A148 Between Sculthorpe, and Fakenham	A149 Between Burnham Market and Burnham Norton		
B1356	A152 near A16	A151 in Spalding		
B1357	Barrier Bank near A16 Cowbit Road	A17 Washway Road		
B1358 (defunct)	A17 in Holbeach Clough	A17 in Fleet Hargate	De facto bypass of Holbeach; became part of A17 by the end of WWII (old A17 became B1168 and A151). A mile of the route is still A17 while the remainder was downgraded to Class III status as the C774.	
B1358 (defunct)	A160/A18 in Ulceby	Immingham Docks	Upgraded to a rerouted A160 in 1969; route west of Ulceby now part of a rerouted B1211 and the portion between Ulceby and the new A160 now part of a rerouted A1077 after the current A160 was built.	
B1359	A17 near Gedney, Lincolnshire	Gedney Drove End	by way of Gedney Dyke	
B1360 (defunct)	A16 in Market Place, Boston	Boston Docks	Upgraded to Class I status as the A1138 in the 1970s; the northern half is now unclassified due to rerouting of the A16 and resultant cutting back of the A1138.	
B1360 (defunct)	B1262 (now local road) High Street	B1003 (now A1192) Tritton Road	Former portion of the A1180; declassified in 2017.	
B1361	A199/A6094 junction in Wallyford	A198/B6371 junction	First used from Immingham to Grimsby. Due to its importance, it was upgraded to Class I status as the A1136 after World War II; the section west of the A180 is now an eastern extension of the B1210. Next used from Caistor to Stallingborough. Upgraded to Class I status and is now part of the A1173.	
B1362	Hedon, East Riding of Yorkshire	Withernsea, East Riding of Yorkshire		
B1363	A1036 Gillygate/Lord Mayor's Walk, York	B1257 Leysthorpe Lane		
B1364	A64 near Scarborough railway station	A165 Columbus Ravine, Scarborough		
B1365	A174/A1032 at Bluebells Corner	A172 Stocking Hill		
B1366	A174 West Road/Zetland Road	A171		
B1367 (defunct)	A13 (now A124) in Barking	A123 in Barking	Declassified when the Barking Ring Road was built.	
B1368	A10 near Puckeridge	A10 in Harston	In Harston, the B1368 and not the A10 carries the name of London Road, despite both routes heading for London. Similarly milestones along the route offer distances to London.	19.4 mi (31.2 km)
B1369	A133 Wellesley Road	B1442 Centenary Way		
B1370	Stone Cross Roundabout – A143 Beccles Road	A47 in Gorleston-on-Sea		
B1371 (defunct)	A17 at Swinesheads Bridge	A154 (now A52) at the Chain Bridge, Boston	Due to the route's importance, it was upgraded to Class I status as the A1121 in the late 1950s.	
B1372 (defunct)	A18 (now A46) in Cleethropes	A1098 in Cleethropes	Declassified.	
B1372 (defunct)	A16 in Spilsby	A158 west of Scremby	Upgraded to the A1115 early on, but was downgraded again in 1988 and is now unclassified.	
B1373	A1104 west of Beesby	A157 in Withern	Originally used from Withern to Maltby-le-Marsh. Became part of an extended A157 by 1930.	
B1374	A1098 Taylor's Avenue/Queen's Parade	A1098 Isaac's Hill/High Street		
B1375	A47 Yarmouth Road	A1117 Normanston Drive/Bridge Road	Originally used along Redcar Road and Church Street in Guisborough. Declassified in the 1990s due to completion of the A171 Guisborough bypass, which declassified all roads in the town centre.	
B1376	B1277 in Hartlepool	Roundabout on the A179 in Hartlepool	Middleton Road, Hartlepool	
B1377	A198 in Longniddry	A199 in East Linton		
B1378	Roundabout on A46 Lincoln ring road south of Skellingthorpe	B1003 at Boultham	Straight for nearly its entire length. Originally used along Frodingham Road in Scunthorpe. Declassified after the 1990s (still shown as Class II at this point, but unknown if it still had the B1378 number).	
B1379 (defunct)	A11 (now B1383) in Great Chesterford	A505 in Duxford	Declassified in 1980 due to construction of the M11, which paralleled the route.	
B1380	Bluebells Corner – A1032	Greystones Roundabout – A174/A1053	Originally ran through central Peterborough. Became a spur of the A15 around 1968. Part of the route was demolished in 1971 due to upgrading of the A15, but a 1974 OS map still showed the route in place, but with no number. The mapping had been updated to 1972, suggesting that the rebuilding project was still incomplete at that point. However, the same map also shows the western half of the northern A47 link in place.	
B1381	A142 Mepal Road/Ely Road	A1123/B1050		
B1382	Ely	A1101 near Shippea Hill		
B1383	A1184 in Bishop's Stortford	Roundabout on the B184 near Stump Cross	Former routing of the A11 before the M11 was built. Originally ran south of Beccles town centre, cutting the corner between what was then the A145 and A146. Upgraded to Class I status as the A1143; now the eastern section of the B1062 (itself a downgraded A145) and part of the A145 one-way system.	17 mi (27 km)
B1384	A12/A1117/A1145	B1532 London Road Parkfield		
B1385	A47 Yarmouth Road	A47 Yarmouth Road/A1117 Millennium Way		
B1386 (defunct)	A10 in Southery	B1106 in Thetford Forest	Much of route declassified in the 2000s except a section east of Southery (now part of the B1160) and a section east of Feltwell (now part of the B1112).	
B1387	Walsberwick Beach Car Park	A12		
B1388 (defunct)	B1105 in Little Walsingham	A1459 in Blakeney	Declassified in the 2000s; the eastern end is now part of a rerouted B1156.	
B1389	A12 J21	A12 J22	Formerly part of the A12 before construction of the Witham bypass. Originally used along King's Arms Street in North Walsham, connecting the B1150 to the then-A149. Declassified in the 1980s due to completion of the A149 bypass, although it could have become a spur of the B1150 in 1935.	
B1390	B1165 Chapel Gate/Draw Dyke	B1359 Market Street/Gedney Road		
B1391	B1397 in Wyberton	A52 near Swineshead		
B1392	A161 Yorkshireside/Sampson Street	A18 Trunk Road/Station Road	Originally used from Hubbert's Bridge to Kirton. Renumbered as the B1192 mainline in 1935.	
B1393	A121/A104/B172 Epping Forest	A414/M11 J7 near Harlow	Originally ran along Norfolk Street and Brothertoft Road in Boston as an alternative route across town. Upgraded to Class I status as the A1137 in the 1970s.	6 mi (9.7 km)
B1394	Heckington	B1177 near Horbling, Lincolnshire		
B1395	East Heckington	A153 south of North Kyme		
B1396	Doncaster	Haxey		
B1397	B1177 in Dowsby, Lincolnshire	Roundabout with A16, Boston, Lincolnshire	Originally ran along Victoria Avenue in Woodhall Spa. Became a spur of the B1192 in 1935 and has since been declassified.	18 mi (29 km)
B1398	Lincoln	A18 just east of Scunthorpe		
B1399	Holton cum Beckering	A158		
B1400	Messingham	Kirton in Lindsey		
B1401 (defunct)	A1030 in Clee	A1098	Former portion of the B1198, created when the A1098 split the B1198 in two. Upgraded to an extended A1031 by 1932.	
B1401 (defunct)	A63 in Hull	A1105 in Hull	Ran along the southern half of Pickering Road in Hull; formerly part of the A1105 until it was downgraded. Declassified in the 1980s after the A63 was rerouted.	
B1402	A1077	B1206 New Holland Road/Wold Road		
B1403	A161 High Street/Haxey Road	A620 Main Street	A631 separates the two parts	
B1404	Seaham	Houghton-le-Spring		
B1405	Grangetown	Queen Alexandra Bridge		
B1406 (defunct)			Loop off the A16 to serve Grimsby Town railway station. Declassified due to road improvements in Grimsby town centre.	
B1408	A12 J25 at Marks Tey	A1124 Tollgate Roundabout at Stanway	Former portion of the A12. Originally used as a connecting route from the A1 (now A199) to Longniddry. Became an extension of the B6363 between 1944 and 1946.	
B1409 (defunct)	B1173 east of Wisbech	A47 east of Wisbech	Declassified.	
B1410	Ruswarp	Briggswath	Originally used from Fordham to Kennett End. Renumbered as an extension of the B1085 in 1935.	1.6 miles (2.6 km)
B1411	Ely	A1101 at Gold Hill Corner		
B1412 (defunct)	A1101 in Three Holes	A1101 in Upwell	Formerly B1101 until it was upgraded to the A1101, then downgraded again. Much of route now unclassified, except for a short southern section that is now part of the B1098.	
B1413 (defunct)	A11 in Norwich	A146 (now A147) in Norwich	Formerly the northern end of the A146. The B1413 number does not appear until the early 1950s, but the route was likely numbered before then. Now unclassified.	
B1414	B1441 Wheeley Heath	B1352 Harwich		10 mi (16 km)
B1415	A170 in Allerston	B1215 in Ebberston	Former portion of the A170 before it was rerouted.	
B1416	Whitby	A171 near Fylingthorpe		
B1418	B1012 South Woodham Ferrers	A414 Woodham Mortimer		4.7 mi (7.6 km)
B1419	A1321 Barstable Basildon	B1464 Vange Basildon		1.0 mi (1.6 km)
B1420	A13 at Five Bells Basildon	A1014 The Manorway Corringham		2.3 mi (3.7 km)
B1421	A124 at Upminster	B186 North Ockendon		3.0 mi (4.8 km)
B1422 (defunct)	A1124 in Colchester	A133 in Colchester	Initially B1026 before it was upgraded to the A1070, then downgraded again. Became part of the A134 in the 1980s.	
B1423	B1255 in Bridlington	B1254 in Bridlington	Designated in the early 2010s, former portions of the A1038 and B1426. Originally ran from Barking to Becontree; now the A1153.	
B1424 (defunct)	A1130 in Acklam, Middlesbrough	Mandale Road (former A174)	Upgraded to Class I status as the A1032 in the mid-1970s.	
B1425 (defunct)	A1045 in Thornaby on Tees	A174 (now A1130) in Thornaby on Tees	Declassified around 2000, probably along with the A1045.	
B1426	A1 Western Bypass at Lobley Hill	A184/A185 in Heworth	The eastern section was formerly part of the A184 while the western section was formerly part of the A692. Originally used along Springfield Avenue in Bridlington, connecting the A1038 to itself. Became part of the B1423 in the early 2010s.	
B1427	A64, Seamer Road, Scarborough	A165, Filey Road, Scarborough		
B1428	A428 near A1 junction	A428 east of St Neots	Formerly the A428/A45 before the bypass opened. Originally ran along Ferensway in Hull. Now part of a rerouted A1079.	
B1429	A17 near RAF Cranwell	A15 in Cranwell		
B1430	A1077 in Scunthorpe	B1207 in Winterton	Originally began at the B1216 in Frodingham, but this section was declassified (along with this section of the B1216) due to completion of the A1077 Scunthorpe northern bypass.	
B1431 (defunct)	B1430 in Scunthorpe	A1029 in Scunthorpe	Declassified.	
B1431 (defunct)	A18/A46 west of Laceby	A16 near Ludborough	Upgraded to a rerouted eastern end of the A18 in the 1970s.	
B1432	B1285 at Cold Hesledon	A1086 at Little Thorpe	Originally used from Winceby to Partney. Became a portion of a rerouted A158 after World War II.	3 mi (4.8 km)
B1433	A159 North Street in Gainsborough	A631 at White's Wood Farm	Former routing of the A631 before the bypass was built.	
B1434	A46 near Usselby, Lincolnshire	A1084 east of Brigg		
B1435	B1062 Hillside Road West in Bungay	B1062 Hillside Road East in Bungay		
B1436	A148, near Cromer	Thorpe Market		
B1437	A12 west of Kessingland	A12 north of Kessingland	Former routing of the A12.	
B1438	Woodbridge, Suffolk	Wickham Market	Formerly the A12 before bypassing.	
B1439	West Newton, Norfolk	A149 at Babingley, Norfolk		
B1440	Snettisham, Norfolk	Hillington	When the A149 bypass opened, the old road through Snettisham, Ingoldisthorpe, and Dersingham was re-numbered, almost doubling the length of this B-road	
B1441	B1033 in Weeley	A133 in Great Clacton	Former routing of the A133. Originally used from Guyhirn to Wisbech, formerly a portion of the A47 before 1933. Downgraded to Class III as the C312 sometime after 1986, but was upgraded back to Class II as the B1542 in 2020.	4.7 mi (7.6 km)
B1442	A133 in Little Clacton	B1369 in Great Clacton	Originally ran along Chapel Road in Wisbech between the B1441 and A150 (later A1101); formerly a portion of the A1027 before it was downgraded. Later downgraded to Class III as a portion of the C313, but became part of the new B1542 in 2020.	2.5 mi (4.0 km)
B1443	Stamford, Lincolnshire	Thorney, Cambridgeshire		
B1444	A46 in Grimsby	A1136 in Grimsby		
B1445	Patrington, East Riding of Yorkshire	Easington		
B1446 (defunct)	A175 in South Bank	A1085 Trunk Road in Grangetown	Shown as a Class I road on a 1932 map, but the B1446 number was designated around 1935. Now declassified due to road improvements in the area.	
B1447	A171 at High Hawsker	Robin Hood's Bay		
B1448	A168 in Gristhwaite	A168 in South Kilvington	Former routing of the A168 through Thirsk.	
B1449	A1111 in Bilsby	A52 in Mumby		
B1450	A18 in Gunness	B1501 in Ashby	Former routing of the A18. Originally continued to the A18 in Ashby, but was cut back due to completion of the B1501.	
B1451	A52 at the Lumley Square gyratory, Skegness	A52/A158 in Skegness	Loop off the A52 to serve Skegness Sea Front.	
B1452	A1004 in Palmers Green	A406 North Circular Road in New Southgate		
B1453	A1000 at Whetstone	A111 near Southgate		
B1454	A149 at Heacham	A148 at Tattersett		
B1455	A404 in Holwell	B158 in Essendon		
B1456	A137 at Ipswich	Shotley Gate		8.5 mi (13.7 km)
~~B1457~~	unused			
B1458	A1156 in Ipswich	Ipswich Docks		
B1459	B174 at Collier Row	B175 at Chase Cross		1 mi (1.6 km)
B1460	A171 near Newholm	Whitby		
B1461	A41 at Mill Hill	B552 at Mill Hill Village	Daws Lane and Hammers Lane	
B1462	A598 at Finchley Central	B552 at Holders Hill Circus	Nether Street (Southern end) and Dollis Lane	
~~B1463~~	unused			
B1464	A13 Five Bells Basildon	A13 Thundersley Sadlers Farm	Was a portion of A13 before c. 1976.	3.4 mi (5.5 km)
~~B1465~~ – ~~B1500~~	unused			
B1501	A1569 in Bottesford	A1029 in Brumby		
B1502	A119 east of Hertford	A414 near Great Amwell	Former routing of A414.	
~~B1503~~	unused			
B1504 (defunct)			Number reserved for the former A64 and A169 through Malton; now B1248 and B1257. The B1504 number was likely never used, as a 1979 map shows the current route numbers.	
B1505	A191 at Holystone	A193 at Bedlington	For most of its route (Between Killingworth and Cramlington) it runs alongside the A189 on its former route, and acts as frontage / diversion road. Running through Forest Hall it is called Great Lime Road. Between Cramlington and Bedlington it is called Horton Road.	9.5 mi (15.3 km)
B1506	A1304 near Newmarket	A14 near Kentford	Essentially a sliproad; route formerly a portion of A45.	
B1507 (defunct)	A10 north of Downham Market	A1122 south of Downham Market	Original routing of A10 through Downham Market; declassified in 2000.	
B1508	A134 Colchester	Sudbury		12.9 mi (20.8 km)
~~B1509~~ – ~~B1511~~	unused			
B1512 (defunct)	A10 east of Downham Market	A1122 west of Downham Market	Original routing of A1122 through Downham Market; declassified in the 1990s.	
B1513	A66 in Cargo Fleet	A66 in South Bank		
B1514	A141 west of Brampton	A1123 in Hartford	Former routing of A141 through Huntingdon.	
B1515	A151 west of Holbeach	A17 at Fleet Hargate east of Holbeach	Formerly a part of the A17 through Holbeach before the bypass was built.	3.1 mi (5.0 km)
B1516	A194 in Fellgate	A185 in Jarrow		
B1517	A17 north of Sleaford	Roundabout with the A15 southwest of Sleaford	Was part of A153 route through Sleaford before the A15 and A17 bypasses were built.	
B1518	Sleaford	Roundabout with A15 and A17	Was part of A15 through Sleaford before bypasses were built.	
B1519	A183 in Bournmoor	A182/A183 in Shiney Row	Old routing of A183.	
B1520	A16 south of Louth	A16 north of Louth	Former routing of A16 through Louth.	
B1521 (defunct)	B1200 in Louth	B1520 in Louth	Former A1097 (and possible spur of A157) before it was downgraded to the B1521. Now a spur of the B1200.	
B1522	Ryhope	Sunderland	Previously the A1018 between Ryhope (Cherry Knowle Hospital) and Sunderland before the opening of the Sunderland southern radial route.	
B1523	A1061 in South Newsham	B1327 in Blyth	Except for the southern end, the route was formerly B1327 (and later A1061).	
B1524	Northborough	Market Deeping	Previously the A15 between Northborough and Market Deeping, before the opening of the Market Deeping bypass in 1998. Part of the road in Deeping Gate was itself a replacement for an older route, built as part of the Glinton bypass project in 1989. Occasionally used as a diversionary route, due to accidents on A15.	
B1525	Market Deeping	A1175 road, near Hop Pole	Previously the A16 route through Market Deeping before the opening of the Market Deeping bypass in 1998. The A16 route became the A1175 in August 2010.	
~~B1526~~	unused			
B1527	A140 near Tasburgh	B1332 in Woodton	Originally the eastern end of the B1135 before it was downgraded east of Wymondham.	
B1528	A158 Burgh Road in Skegness	A52 Lumley Square gyratory in Skegness		
B1529	B1383 in Bishop's Stortford	A1250 in Bishop's Stortford	Formerly the A1059 (and B1003 before that).	
~~B1530~~	unused			
B1531	A1117 in Oulton Broad	A12 in Lowestoft	Former routing of A146 into Lowestoft.	
B1532	A12 south of Parkfield	A12 in Lowestoft	Former routing of A12.	
B1533	A15 east of Lincoln	B1308 in Lincoln	Former C4; upgraded to Class II status when the Lincoln Eastern Bypass opened in 2020.	
B1534	A143 in Bradwell	A47 in Beaufort Way		
B1535	A47 near Honingham	A1067 in Lenwade		
B1536			Proposed number for the former A52 through Grantham. The current A52 between the A607 sections will become the A607 with the B1536 multiplexing with it and the A52 between the B1174 sections will become the B1174 with the B1536 multiplexing with it.	
~~B1537~~	unused			
B1538	Roundabout west of the M18/M180 roundabout	Roundabout at the Hatfield Colliery site	Known as the "DN7 Hatfield Link Road", opened in December 2020.	
B1539	A1290	Queen Alexandra Bridge	Created after the A1231 was rerouted over the Northern Spire Bridge. The route was originally the B1290 until it was upgraded to the A1231 in the 1970s.	
B1540	A172 in Nunthorpe	B1380 in Stainton	Stainton Way; likely created in 2018 during a "Network Review" by Middlesbrough Council as it does appear on an network map supplied by the council in a FoI request. However, as of June 2023 the number does not appear on any OS maps or Google maps, nor is it signed on the ground. May have been part of the C116 (which still exists east of the Southern Cross junction) before 2018.	
B1541	Newport Interchange (A66/A1032)	Middlehaven Interchange (A66)	Likely created in 2018 during a "Network Review" by Middlesbrough Council as it does appear on an network map supplied by the council in a FoI request. However, as of June 2023 the number does not appear on any OS maps or Google maps, nor is it signed on the ground. The B1513 and B1272 have been extended to meet the B1541.	
B1542	B1187 in Guyhirn	C313 in Wisbech	Was a portion of A47 until it was rerouted to the east back of the River Nene and downgraded to the B1441. Sometime after 1986, the road was downgraded to Class III status as the C312. But in 2019 the road gained its current number when the C312 was upgraded back to Class II status, although it was rerouted slightly in Wisbech over a portion of the C313 (former B1442) instead of following the original route along North Brink.	
~~B1543~~ – ~~B1599~~	unused			
B1600	Forth Street in Newcastle upon Tyne	A189 Jesmond Dene Road in Newcastle upon Tyne	Former B6333, B6334, B1304, B1308 and B1309, designated in the 1980s.	
~~B1601~~ – ~~B1619~~	unused			
