= Tibthorpe =

Village and civil parish in the East Riding of Yorkshire, England

Coordinates: 53.985265°N 0.535096°W

- Location within the East Riding of Yorkshire
- Population: 157 (2011 census)
- OS grid reference: SE961553
- Civil parish: Tibthorpe
- Unitary authority: East Riding of Yorkshire
- Ceremonial county: East Riding of Yorkshire
- Region: Yorkshire and the Humber
- Country: England
- Sovereign state: United Kingdom
- Post town: DRIFFIELD
- Postcode district: YO25
- Dialling code: 01377
- Police: Humberside
- Fire: Humberside
- Ambulance: Yorkshire
- UK Parliament: Bridlington and The Wolds

Tibthorpe is a village and civil parish in the East Riding of Yorkshire, England. According to the 2011 UK census, Tibthorpe parish had a population of 157, a decrease on the 2001 UK census figure of 162. It is 5 miles (8 km) to the west of Driffield on the edge of the Yorkshire Wolds, it lies on the B1248 road between the villages of Bainton to the south and Wetwang to the north. High Wood and Low Wood to the south are a haven for wildlife.

The name Tibthorpe derives from either the Old English or Old Norse personal name Tibba/Tibbi, and the Old Norse þorp meaning 'secondary settlement'.

The village has a long history stretching back to before the Domesday Book when it was known as Tibetorp. It is recorded that centuries ago monks from Watton Abbey pastured sheep around the village and could rest at a 'chapel of ease' located in the village.

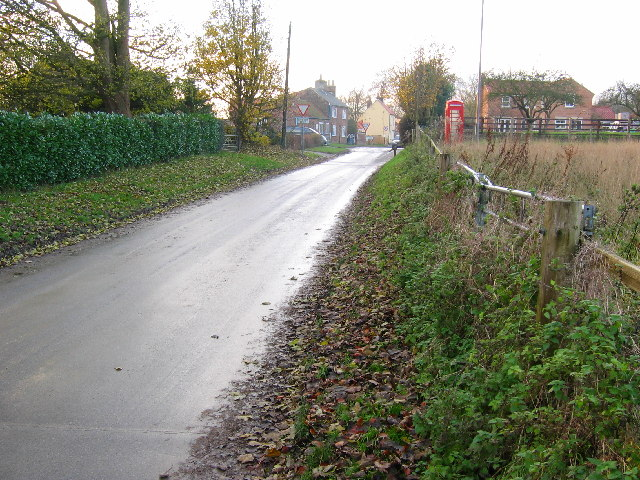
Tibthorpe

The village has no pub, school or church. There was once a Methodist Chapel, built in 1823, that was demolished some years ago, along with a number of 18th century cottages, during road construction.

In the past several small businesses flourished in the village, including a cobbler, a fishmonger, a milkman, a butcher and a fruiterer as well as a village store and blacksmith.

== See also ==
- Listed buildings in Tibthorpe
