= A104 road (England) =

Trunk road in London

Coordinates: 51.60113°N 0.01442°E

A104

Route information
- Length: 13.2 mi (21.2 km)

Major junctions
- Southwest end: Islington
- A1 A1200 A1199 A105; A10 A1207 A107 A1006 A112 A114 A503 A406 A1199 A1009 A110 A121 A1069 A121
- Northeast end: Epping

Location
- Country: United Kingdom
- Constituent country: England
- Primary destinations: Hackney Downs railway station, Dalston Junction railway station & Essex Road railway station.

Road network
- Roads in the United Kingdom; Motorways; A and B road zones
← A103	→ A105

The A104 is an A road which runs from Islington Green in London to Epping in Essex, England.

== Route ==
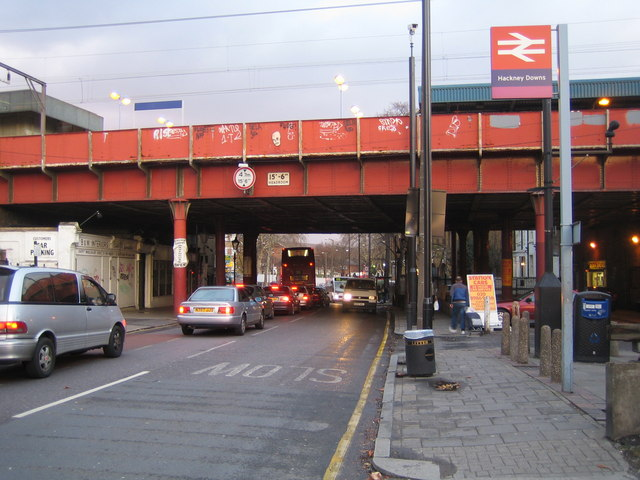
A104 Dalston Lane railway bridge Old and new style height warning signs can be seen on the bridge which carries the railway through Hackney Downs station over the A104 Dalston Lane.

The A104 takes in Essex Road, Balls Pond Road, Dalston Lane (part of), Pembury Road, Cricketfield Road, Downs Road (part of), Lower Clapton Road (part of) and Lea Bridge Roundabout (both shared with A107), Lea Bridge Road, Whipps Cross Roundabout, Woodford New Road, High Road Woodford Green, and Epping New Road.

== History ==
The southern section of the A104 follows its original course, as set out in the 1922 Ministry of Transport List of Class I and Class II Roads and Numbers. The route was defined as "London (Essex Road, Balls Pond Road, Lea Bridge Road) - Woodford".

The northern section - between Woodford and Wake Arms - was originally part of the A11, which ran continuously between Aldgate in the City of London and Norwich, Norfolk. The A11 through Woodford, Buckhurst Hill and Epping Forest became known as the A104 after the M11 motorway opened between Woodford and Bishop's Stortford in 1975. The sections north of Wake Arms were renumbered B1393 (through Epping), A414 (through Harlow) and A1184 (through Sawbridgeworth and Bishop's Stortford).

=== Essex Road ===
According to the 1985 article "Islington: Communications", the northern portion of Essex Road was known as Seveney Street in the 1500s, a title which suggests the road could have Roman origins. Throughout its history Essex Road has also taken the names Lower Street and Lower Road (as opposed to Upper Street, which remains the name of the A1 route). Its current title appeared in official documents from at least 1863. Islington Local History Education Trust believes Essex Road is so named because it is part of a main route into the county of Essex, although it may take its name from the earldom of Essex. A railway station bearing the street's name was opened in 1904 - on the Northern City Line between Finsbury Park and Moorgate. As of 2022, station is served by Great Northern trains between London Moorgate and Welwyn Garden City or Stevenage (via Hertford North).

=== Lea Bridge Road ===
Lea Bridge Road runs between Clapton and Whipps Cross. Until the mid-18th century, a ferry crossing existed at the River Lea between Clapton and Leyton. Legislation from eighteenth century and histories of Hackney and Leyton refer to the crossing point as "Jeremy's ferry" - a name which was used from at least 1709. The first bridge near Jeremy's ferry was constructed in 1745. The River Lea Bridge and Roads Act 1757 (30 Geo. 2. c. 59) set out that a permanent crossing should be installed at Jeremy's ferry:

An Act for building a Bridge over the River Lea, at or near a Place called Jeremy's Ferry; and for making, repairing and widening Roads from thence into the great Roads at Snaresbrook in the County of Essex, and at Clapton in the County of Middlesex.

A permanent timber bridge was built in 1772, which was replaced with an iron crossing in the early 1820s, followed by a new bridge in the 1890s.

Mapping from the 18th century suggests the route north-east out of Leyton, further into the county of Essex, was established through heath and forest in the 1700s, which was "the haunt of highwaymen" at the time.

=== Epping New Road ===
There is no evidence of Epping New Road (between Woodford and Wake Arms) in John Norden's 1594 "Map of Essex". Historians have identified two main routes between London and Epping in the sixteenth century - the first through Waltham Abbey and the second through Stratford, Chigwell and Abridge. A route between Epping and Loughton was established by 1678, but the Epping New Road - bypassing Loughton - was not created until 1834. According to the Buckhurst Hill Residents' Society, the creation of the Epping New Road "encouraged some of the earliest developments" in the town. A study of the Epping and Ongar Highway Trust, which was charged with caring for public highways in the corridor between Woodford and Harlow, suggests that around 25 coaches passed through Epping each day in the 1800s on what appeared to be the main route between London, Cambridge, Bury St Edmunds and Norwich.

The forest either side of Epping New Road is protected according to the Epping Forest Act 1878 and is managed by the Corporation of London (which also governs the Square Mile in central London). As of 2022, the road is maintained by Essex County Council and Redbridge London Borough Council (southernmost portion).
