= A1152 road =

Road in England

A1152

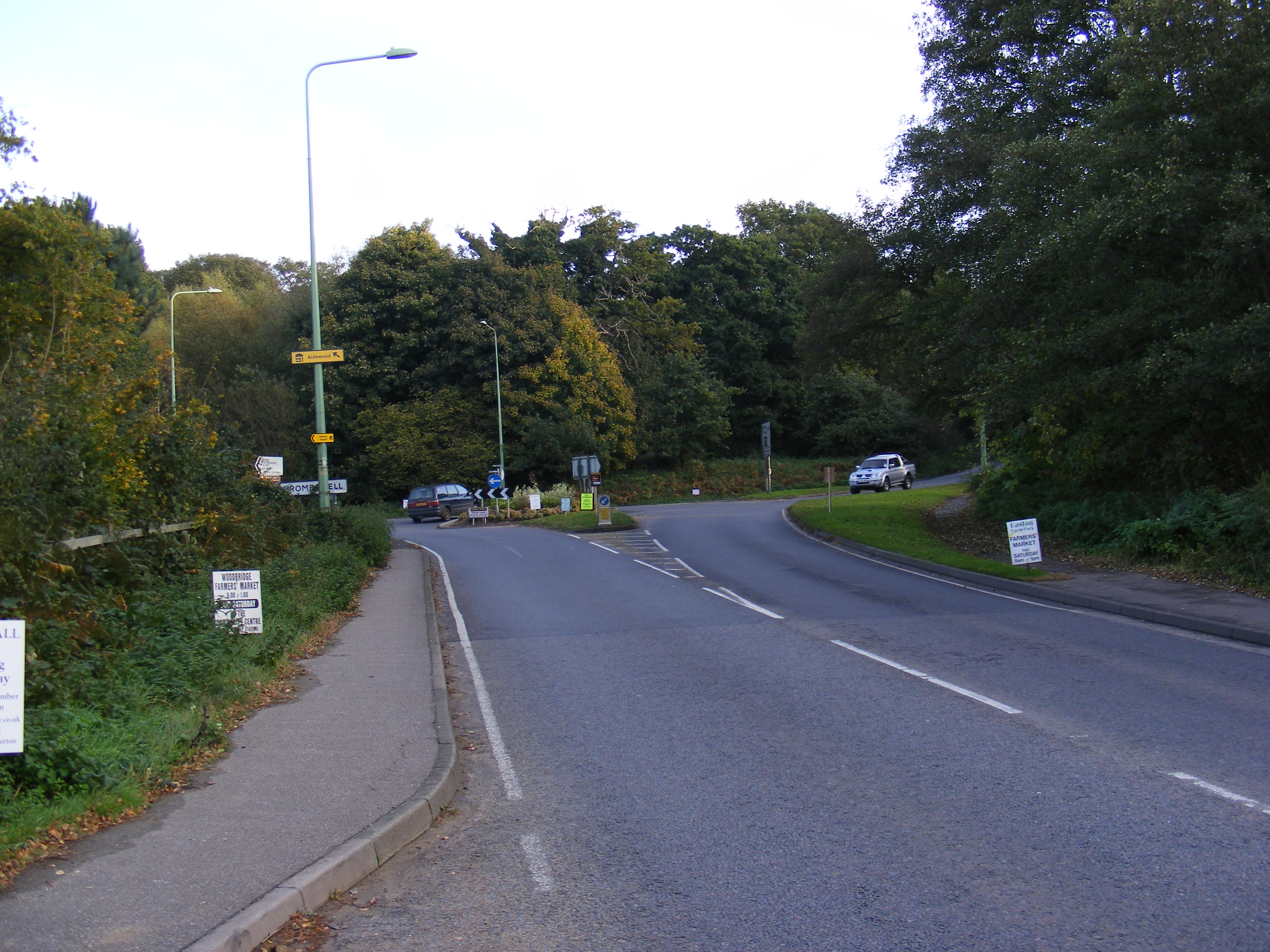
- A1152 Wilford Bridge Road Looking towards roundabout.

Route information
- Length: 5.7 mi (9.2 km)

Major junctions
- West end: Woodbridge / A12
- A12; B1438; B1083 to Bawdsey; B1084 to Orford
- Northeast end: Rendlesham

Location
- Country: United Kingdom
- Primary destinations: Rendlesham

Road network
- Roads in the United Kingdom; Motorways; A and B road zones

The A1152 is an A road in the English county of Suffolk. It links the A12 on the outskirts of Woodbridge to Rendlesham. It is 5.7 miles (9.2 km) long.

== Route ==
The road leaves the A12 at a roundabout on the northern edge of Woodbridge. It runs due east through fields as the Woodbridge northern bypass. At Melton there is a signalised crossroads with the B1438 (the original course of the A12) before bypassing the village centre and turning right to cross the railway line at a level crossing at Melton railway station.

Beyond Melton the road continues east across marshes to cross the River Deben at Wilford Bridge. Beyond the bridge the B1083 forks right towards Sutton Hoo at a roundabout whilst the A1152 continues ahead, passing a golf course on the south and the village of Bromeswell on the north. After Bromeswell the road ahead continues as the B1084 to Orford while the A1152 turns to travel north-east through Eyke.

The road to passes to the south of Rendlesham village with the main housing area of the former RAF Bentwaters immediately on the northern edge of the road and airbase itself to the south. It continues through woodland to end at a roundabout at the main entrance to RAF Bentwaters, now used primarily as a business centre. The road ahead is numbered the B1069 to Snape where it joins the A1094.

== History ==
The A1152 was created in the 1960s by shortening two B-roads: the B1084 from the Woodbridge bypass to Bromeswell, and the B1069 from there on. It received its A rating because of the volume of traffic serving RAF Bentwaters, at the time a major Cold War USAF airbase.
