= Horsley Cross =

Hamlet in Essex, England

Coordinates: 51.90560°N 1.08339°E

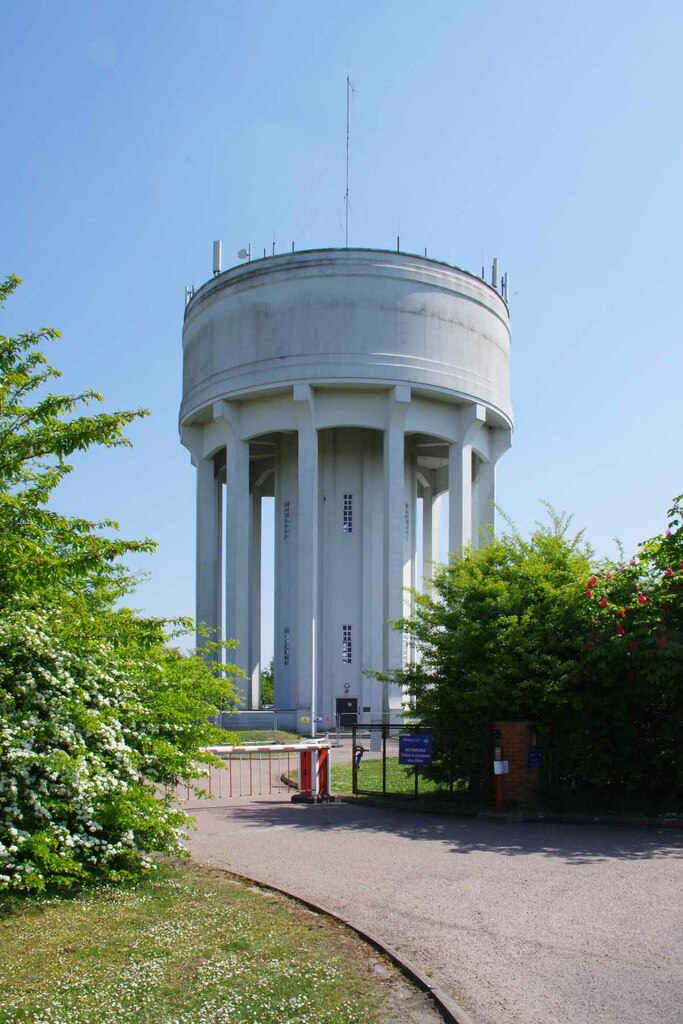
The Water Tower at Horsley Cross

Horsley Cross is a hamlet in Tendring District in the English county of Essex.

Horsley Cross lies on the B1035 road just to the north of the main A120 that connects London and Harwich and to the south of Horsleycross Street. Notable edifices are the Cross Inn and the water tower. The parishes of Mistley, Bradfield and Wix all meet at the Horsley Cross roundabout, where the abovementioned roads cross each other.

The population of the hamlet is included in the civil parish of Mistley.

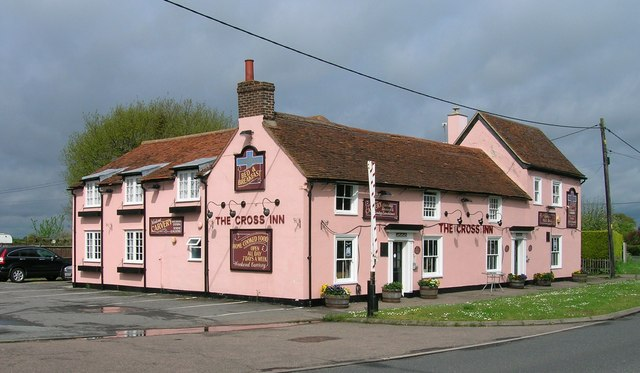
The Cross Inn, Horsley Cross
