= Listed buildings in Newholm-cum-Dunsley =

Newholm-cum-Dunsley is a civil parish in the county of North Yorkshire, England. It contains ten listed buildings that are recorded in the National Heritage List for England. All the listed buildings are designated at Grade II, the lowest of the three grades, which is applied to "buildings of national importance and special interest". The parish contains the villages of Newholm and Dunsley, and the surrounding countryside. The listed buildings consist of houses and cottages, farmhouses and farm buildings, a public house, a chapel, and a lodge with associated structures.

== Buildings ==
Name and location	Photograph	Date	Notes
Low Heulah Cottage; 54.48089°N 0.68268°W	—	17th century	A house and cottage, later combined, it is in stone, and has a pantile roof with stone copings and square kneelers. There are two storeys and four bays. On the front is a doorway, and the windows are tripartite, some with sashes, some with casements, and there is a small round window.
Ye Olde Beehive Inn; 54.48256°N 0.66386°W		17th century (probable)	The public house is in whitewashed stone, and has a pantile roof with stone copings and square kneelers. There is one storey and an attic, and six bays. On the front is a doorway, and the windows are a mix, including sashes in architraves, casements and a fixed light, and in the attic are three dormers.
Fairfax Farm House; 54.48895°N 0.67830°W		18th century	A house and cottage combined into one house, it is in stone, and has a Welsh slate roof with stone copings and curved kneelers. There are two storeys, the former cottage on the left has one bay, and the former house has three. The doorway in the centre of the house has a pediment, and the cottage has a doorway with a plain surround. The windows in the cottage are casements, and in the house are sash windows in architraves, with flat arches, cut voussoirs and keystones.
Hodgson Haggs Farmhouse and byre range 54.49430°N 0.67955°W	—	18th century	The farmhouse is in stone, and has a pantile roof with stone copings and curved kneelers. There are two storeys and two bays, and the windows are small-paned casements. To the right is a long single-storey range, partly a byre, and partly incorporated into the house.
Manor Farmhouse; 54.48187°N 0.66406°W	—	Late 18th century	The house is in stone, and has a roof of curly tiles with stone copings and curved kneelers. There are two storeys and three bays, and a single-storey single-bay extension to the right. The central doorway has a fanlight and a pedimented hood on brackets, and the windows are sashes.
Newholm Hall; 54.48609°N 0.65047°W	—	Late 18th or early 19th century	The house is in stone and has a hipped Welsh slate roof. There are two storeys and six bays. In the centre is a prostyle Doric porch, and the windows are sashes.
Methodist Church; 54.48244°N 0.66386°W		Early 19th century	The chapel is in stone, and has a pantile roof with stone copings and square kneelers. There is a single storey and a basement. On the right, a flight of stone steps leads up to a doorway with a blocked fanlight in a round-arched chamfered opening. To the left, two round-arched windows alternate with two flat-headed windows in architraves.
Raven Hill Farmhouse and barn 54.49683°N 0.66645°W		Early 19th century (probable)	The farmhouse is in stone, and has a Welsh slate roof with stone copings and curved kneelers. There are two storeys and three bays. The windows are paired sashes with lintels and keystones. The barn to the right has a pantile roof, and contains slit vents.
Greystone Farmhouse; 54.48532°N 0.65905°W		Early to mid-19th century	The farmhouse is in stone, and has a pantile roof with stone copings and curved kneelers. There are two storeys, three bays, and a single-storey single-bay extension on the right. The doorway has an oblong fanlight, and the windows are sashes with heavy lintels.
South Lodge, wall and gate piers 54.48512°N 0.68956°W		Mid-19th century	The lodge at the entry to the woodland is in stone, with quoins, and a pantile roof with stone copings. There is one storey and an attic, and an L-shaped plan, with a front of two bays. On the front is a small gabled porch, and the windows are casements. To the left is a stone wall with flat coping, and four gate piers, two surmounted by seated lions.
