= Horsleycross Street =

Hamlet in Essex, England

Coordinates: 51.91454°N 1.08546°E

Horsleycross Street is a hamlet in the English county of Essex.

Horsleycross Street lies on the B1035 road about a mile to the north of the main A120 that connects London and Harwich and to the north of Horsley Cross.
