= Listed buildings in Tibthorpe =

Tibthorpe is a civil parish in the county of the East Riding of Yorkshire, England. It contains two listed buildings that are recorded in the National Heritage List for England. Both the listed buildings are designated at Grade II, the lowest of the three grades, which is applied to "buildings of national importance and special interest". The parish contains the village of Tibthorpe and the surrounding area, and the listed buildings consist of two houses in the village, both in Main Street.

== Buildings ==
Name and location	Photograph	Date	Notes
16 Main Street; 53.98668°N 0.54004°W	—	Early 19th century (probable)	The house is in pinkish-brown brick, with paired and single gutter brackets, and a pantile roof. There are two storeys and three bays, and a rear outshut. The central doorway has engaged fluted Doric pilasters with impost blocks and an open segmental modillion pediment, and the doorway has a semicircular fanlight. The windows are sashes under flat brick arches.
Beech House; 53.98667°N 0.53837°W		Early 19th century (probable)	The house is in pinkish-red brick, and has a pantile roof with tumbled-in brick to the gable end. There are two storeys and three bays, a single-storey two-bay range to the right, and a rear extension. The central doorway has a fanlight with decorative glazing, and a bracketed hood. The windows are sashes, those on the ground floor under cambered arches. The right range has a doorway under a cambered arch with a fanlight, tripartite sash windows, and two gabled roof dormers.
