= Holbeach Drove =

Village in Lincolnshire, England

Coordinates: 52.693020°N 0.03847°W

- Location within Lincolnshire
- OS grid reference: TF326123
  - London: 80 mi (130 km) S
- District: South Holland
- Shire county: Lincolnshire
- Region: East Midlands
- Country: England
- Sovereign state: United Kingdom
- Post town: SPALDING
- Postcode district: PE11
- Dialling code: 01406
- Police: Lincolnshire
- Fire: Lincolnshire
- Ambulance: East Midlands
- UK Parliament: South Holland and The Deepings

Holbeach Drove is a village in the South Holland district of Lincolnshire, England. It is situated approximately 5 miles (8 km) east from Crowland, and at the junction of the B1166 and the B1168 roads.

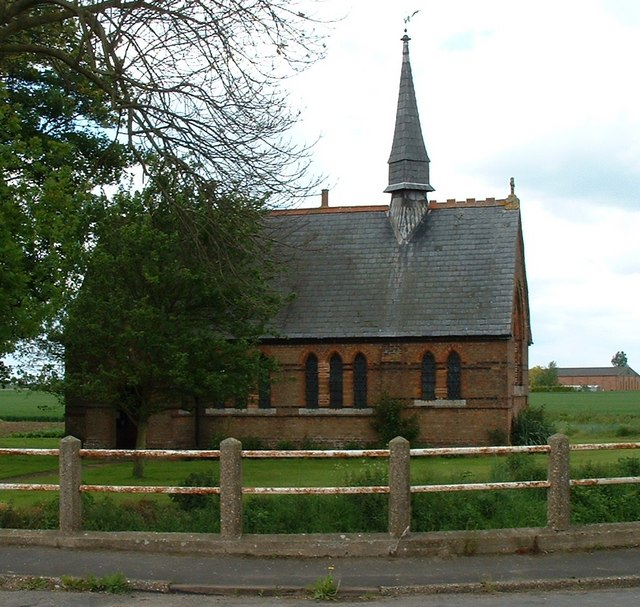
St Polycarp's Church, Holbeach Drove

The village church is dedicated to St Polycarp. There is one local public house, the Golden Ball, and a shop-cum-petrol station.
