= Christchurch, Cambridgeshire =

Village in Cambridgeshire, England

Coordinates: 52.5460°N 0.2027°E

Christchurch
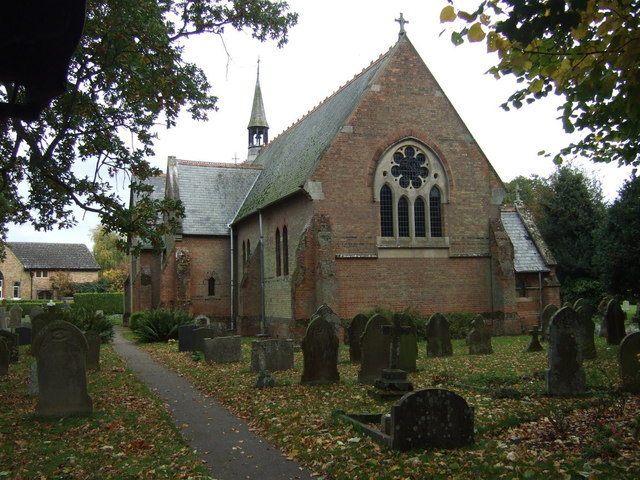
- Christchurch parish church

- Location within Cambridgeshire
- Population: 833 (2011)
- OS grid reference: TL4996
- District: Fenland
- Shire county: Cambridgeshire
- Region: East
- Country: England
- Sovereign state: United Kingdom
- Post town: Wisbech
- Postcode district: PE14
- Dialling code: 01354
- Police: Cambridgeshire
- Fire: Cambridgeshire
- Ambulance: East of England
- UK Parliament: North East Cambridgeshire

Christchurch is a village in the Fenland district of Cambridgeshire, England. The population (including Tipp's End) of the civil parish at the 2011 Census was 833. The village is sited close to the Cambridgeshire/Norfolk border.

Christchurch has a small church, The Church of Christ, which was built in 1863 and consecrated in 1865. This is the source of Christchurch's claim to fame. The rector of the church from 1917 to 1928 was The Rev. Henry Sayers, father of the novelist, Dorothy L. Sayers. He and his wife were buried in unmarked graves in the churchyard at the behest of their daughter Dorothy. A plaque has since been installed in the churchyard to commemorate their interment. One of Sayers' novels, The Nine Tailors, is set in the Christchurch and Upwell area.

The village was allegedly named after the church because of the two large oil paintings hanging in the nave. One depicts Christ crowned with thorns and the other his descent from the cross. Both were brought from Italy by Sir Roger Pratt. Until the turn of the century, the village name was still spelt "Christ Church", and prior to that was known as Brimstone-Hill, presumably after the butterfly which used to be common in the area. Local oral traditional also indicates that the name of Brimstone Hill was derived from the smell of rotting vegetation during the land reclamation projects of the 19th century.

Village facilities include a small combined village school and preschool. There is also a public house, The Dun Cow, which is tied to Elgood's Brewery of Wisbech. There is a recreation ground with football pitch and children's play area. The village playing field also has a skatepark, which was co-funded by donations and the Parish Council, and a new Village Hall next to the Bowling green adjacent to the playing field.

== Governance ==
Christchurch has its own parish council. The village (as at 2022) forms part of the two-seat Elm & Christchurch district council Ward. This lies in the parliamentary constituency of North East Cambridgeshire.

== Christchurch Eco ==
In September 2019, a local resident set up a community-driven environmental group, encouraging the community to find ways to help protect the planet, encourage better animal conservation, think about ways to reduce their carbon footprint, and find ways to recycle challenging waste streams using Terracycle. Items recycled include crisp packets, oral care products, Pringle tubes, and numerous other difficult to recycle items. There are currently four publicly open recycling stations around the village, and all items collected help raise much needed funds for the local primary school "Townley Primary" The group's actions have made it into local news press, including The Wisbech Standard, and The Fenland Citizen.
