= A107 road =

Road in London, England

Coordinates: 51.55439°N 0.05418°W

A107

Major junctions
- From: Whitechapel
- A11 A1208 A1209 A106 A1207 A102 A104; A10 A503
- To: Hackney

Location
- Country: United Kingdom
- Constituent country: England

Road network
- Roads in the United Kingdom; Motorways; A and B road zones

The A107 is an A road in London, England. It runs from Whitechapel to Hackney.

A107 splits off of A11 Whitechapel road just past the Whitechapel underground interchange station and ends when it merges with A503 (Seven Sisters Road). The road is roughly 8 km long.

== Different road names ==
Road A107 goes under the following names (in sequential order from the road's beginning at A11 Whitechapel to its end at Seven Sisters Road):

- Cambridge Heath Road
- Mare Street (at intersection with Andrews Road)
- Amhurst Road (Splits from Mare Street)
- Dalston Lane (At intersection with A104)
- Lower Clapton Road (Along Dalston Lane)
- Upper Clapton Road (after Lea Bridge Roundabout)
- Clapton Common (After intersection with Springfield)
- Amhurst Park (After intersection with A10)

== Miscellaneous ==
Known as Mare Street for much of its length, it crosses the Regent's Canal near the Ash Grove Bus Garage.
