= Newholm-cum-Dunsley =

Civil parish in North Yorkshire, England

Coordinates: 54.483°N 0.669°W

- Civil parish
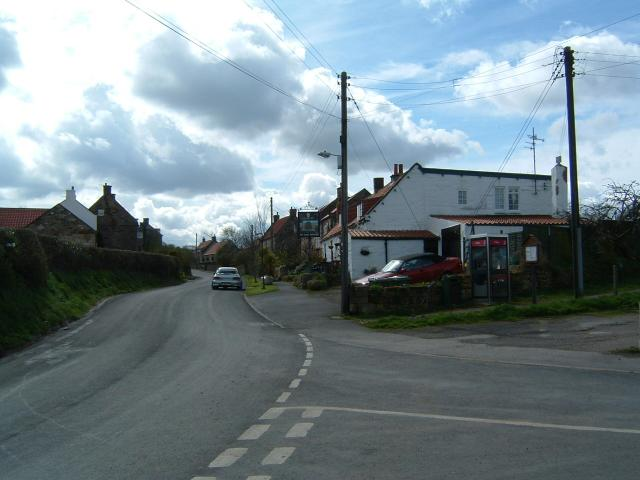
- The village pub in Newholm

- Population: 192 (2011 census)
- OS grid reference: NZ863106
- Civil parish: Newholm-cum-Dunsley
- Unitary authority: North Yorkshire
- Ceremonial county: North Yorkshire
- Region: Yorkshire and the Humber
- Country: England
- Sovereign state: United Kingdom
- Post town: WHITBY
- Postcode district: YO21
- Police: North Yorkshire
- Fire: North Yorkshire
- Ambulance: Yorkshire
- UK Parliament: Scarborough and Whitby

Newholm-cum-Dunsley is a coastal civil parish in the county of North Yorkshire, England, just west of Whitby. The settlements in the parish are the villages of Newholm and Dunsley, and the Raithwaite estate.

According to the 2011 UK census, Newholm-cum-Dunsley parish had a population of 192, a decrease on the 2001 UK census figure of 213.

The area is administered by the unitary North Yorkshire Council; from 1974 to 2023 it was part of the Borough of Scarborough.

== See also ==
- Listed buildings in Newholm-cum-Dunsley
