= A105 road =

Road in London, England

Coordinates: 51.5987°N 0.1109°W

A105

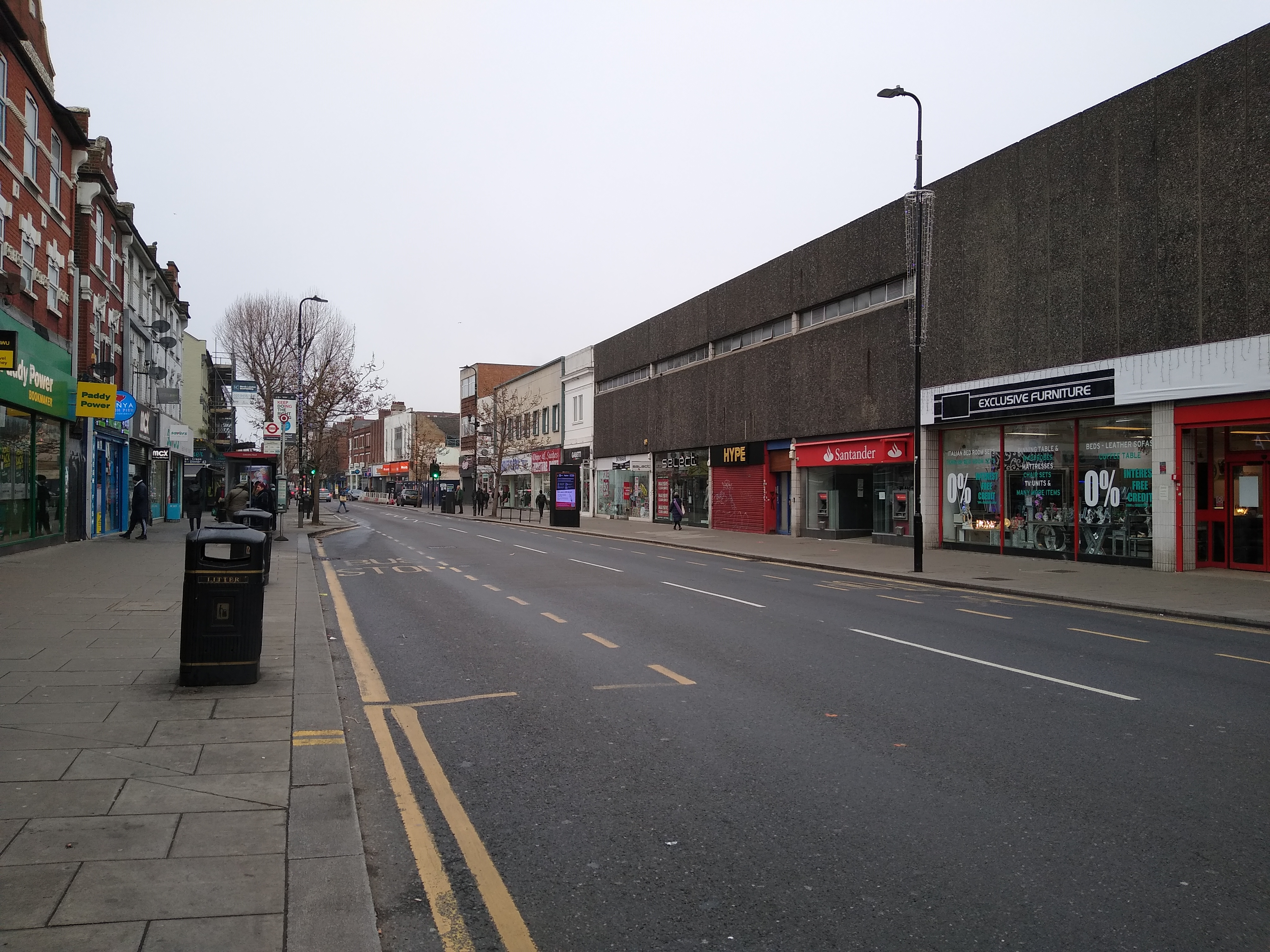

Route information
- Length: 8 mi (13 km)

Major junctions
- From: Canonbury
- A1199 A104 A503 A504 A1080 A109 A406 A1004; A111 A110
- To: Enfield Town

Location
- Country: United Kingdom
- Primary destinations: Wood Green

Road network
- Roads in the United Kingdom; Motorways; A and B road zones
| ← A104 | → A106 |

The A105 road is an A road in London, England. It runs from Canonbury, in between Highbury and Dalston, to Enfield Town. The road is 8 miles (13 km) long. Part of the road forms Green Lanes, one of the longest streets in London, while the A105 also serves as the primary access route to the Shopping City shopping centre in Wood Green.

== History ==
The road originally continued north from Enfield Town through Forty Hill and Bulls Cross, crossing the A10 to the A1010 at Bullsmoor to the south of Waltham Cross. The section between Enfield Town and the A10 is now unclassified. The northernmost section has since been extended eastwards to become part of the A1055.
