= A1094 road =

Road in Suffolk, England

Coordinates: 52.179°N 1.537°E

A1094

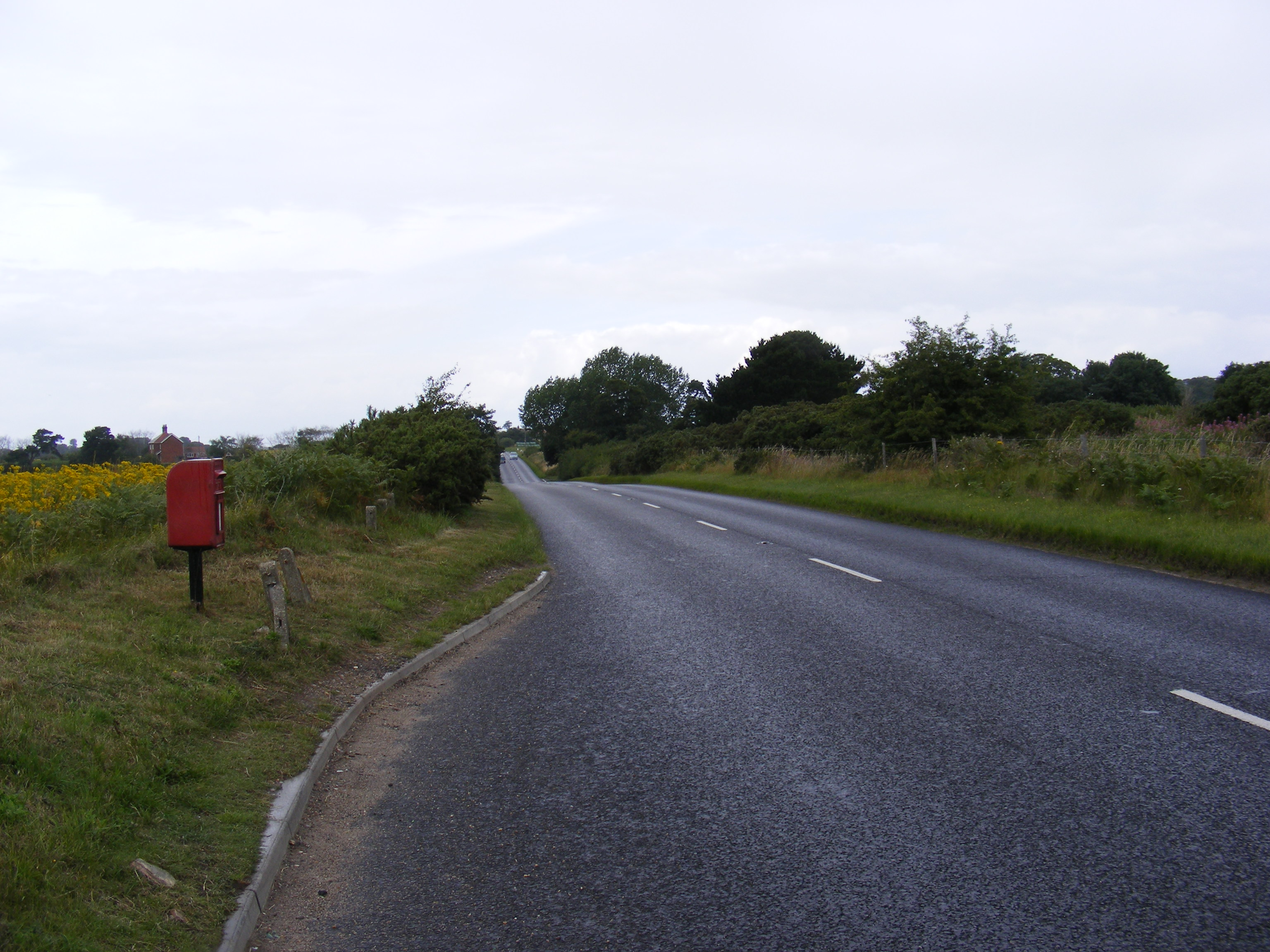
- A1094 Approaching Friston

Route information
- Length: 7 mi (11 km)

Major junctions
- North-west end: A12 at Benhall
- A12
- East end: Aldeburgh

Location
- Country: United Kingdom
- Constituent country: England
- Primary destinations: Aldeburgh

Road network
- Roads in the United Kingdom; Motorways; A and B road zones
← A1092	→ A1095

The A1094 is an A road in the English county of Suffolk. It is around 7 miles (11 km) in length. The road runs from a junction off the A12 trunk road at Friday Street in Benhall to Aldeburgh on the North Sea coast. The road is single carriageway throughout.

== Route description ==
The A1094 junction with the A12 is at the southern end of a short section of dual carriageway to the south of Benhall Lodge. The junction is considered an accident risk and is protected by a 50 miles per hour speed limit and static speed camera. It is the site of a farm and farm shop at Friday Street.

The road travels eastward toward the coast. It crosses the Lowestoft to Ipswich railway line and then the River Fromus, a tributary of the River Alde, before entering the parish of Snape. It passes underneath a dual set of pylons which carry the overhead power lines from the Sizewell nuclear power stations, before passing to the north of the village of Snape. The parish Church of St John the Baptist, a Grade II* listed building dating from the 15th century, is immediately to the north of the road at the junction with the B1069 to Snape and Rendelsham and a minor road to Sternfield.

The site of Snape Anglo-Saxon Cemetery is to the east of the church on former common land. It originally consisted of between eight and ten burial mounds on either side of the road. Much of the site has been destroyed by modern agriculture and the remaining tumuli lie immediately to the south of the road. A series of boat and ship burials were discovered here in the 19th century and the site is a scheduled monument.

The A1094 then passes south of the village of Friston. Two World War II pillboxes are prominent landmarks in a field to the north of the road at the junction with the B1121 towards Saxmundham. These were built in 1940 as part of emergency invasion defences in East Anglia. The junction with the B1069 towards Knodishall and Leiston is passed 200 metres (660 ft) to the east and the road continues in a south-easterly direction towards Aldeburgh, passing more World War II defence systems to the south.

Aldeburgh golf club lies north of the A1094 and is passed before the outskirts of the town are reached. A roundabout controls traffic flow on the edge of the popular seaside resort with the B1122 running north to Leiston at this point. This marks the site of the former Aldeburgh railway station, the terminus of the branch line from Saxmundham. The last trains operated on this line in 1966 and the station was demolished in 1975. The Station public house is now located here.

The road continues into Aldeburgh passing the library before reaching the Grade II* listed Church of St Peter and St Paul with its 14th-century tower overlooking the town. The road turns sharply south at a junction immediately to the east the church, becoming Aldeburgh High Street. It continues for around 700 metres (2,300 ft) to the south, running parallel to the North Sea. It ends near the former Fort Green Mill with the road ahead passing a car park on the edge of the town before becoming a track onto the neck of Orford Ness.
