= A405 road =

Road in Hertfordshire

Coordinates: 51.7091°N 0.3789°W

A405

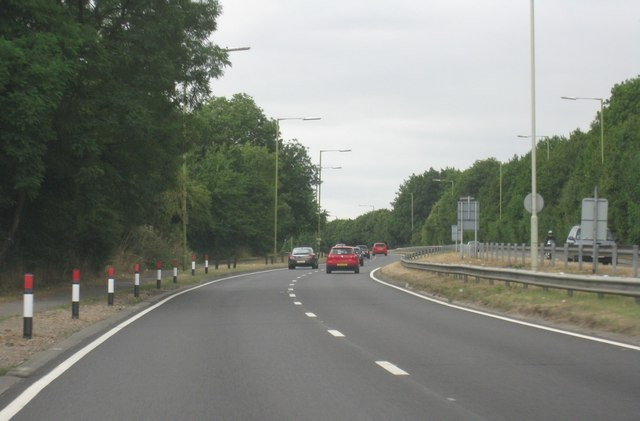
- A405 west of Park Street

Route information
- Length: 4.8 mi (7.7 km)

Major junctions
- West end: Leavesden Green
- A41 A412; M1 M25 A414 A5183
- East end: St Albans

Location
- Country: United Kingdom
- Primary destinations: Watford

Road network
- Roads in the United Kingdom; Motorways; A and B road zones
← A404	→ A406

The A405 is a 4.8 miles (7.7 km) dual carriageway road in Hertfordshire, England, from the A41 at Leavesden Green, near Watford, to the A414 at Park Street Roundabout near St Albans.

== Route ==
The A405 starts at a grade-separated roundabout junction with the A41 at Leavesden Green. From here, it travels northeast to a crossing with Sheepcot Lane at Woodside, then east to a traffic light junction with the A412 near Garston. This 1.4-mile (2.2-km) section is known as Kingsway.

From the A412, the A405 travels north, past West Hertfordshire Crematorium and Penfold Park Golf Course, to junction 6 of the M1 at Waterdale (2.3 miles, 3.7 km).

It then veers northeast, passing the village of Bricket Wood, before meeting the M25 at junction 21a (3.1 miles, 5 km). Drivers wishing to access the M25 from the M1 northbound, or the M1 southbound from the M25, must use this section of the A405 as the junction between the two motorways, known as Chiswell Interchange, does not feature the corresponding slip roads.

After the M25, the A405 continues northeast, with a roundabout junction with the B4630 for Chiswell Green (3.6 miles, 5.8 km), then another with Tippendell Lane for How Wood (4.2 miles, 6.8 km). The road terminates at Park Street Roundabout, a junction with the A414 and the A5183 (formerly part of the A5); until 2009 this was junction 1 of the M10.

== North Orbital Road plan ==
The plans for the North Orbital Road were largely developed from 1924, to stretch from Tilbury, in Essex, to Hertfordshire. There could be a tunnel under the River Thames at Tilbury. It would be 75 miles, and follow built roads for 20 miles.

A section of the A412, south of the Hertfordshire boundary, was improved to 50-ft width in 1928, which opened in late 1929.

In July 1930, Hertfordshire County Council placed an order for £303,000, for part of the North Orbital at Roestock, which was built by Sir Robert McAlpine and Sons. Most of the North Orbital Road, and to south, was planned by May 1938, by Sir Charles Bressey, to be 126 miles.

== Earlier route ==
The A405 originally took up a greater proportion of the North Orbital Road. From Park Street Roundabout, it travelled east, crossing the River Ver and the Midland Main Line before meeting the A6 (now the A1081) at London Colney. It then veered northeast, past Colney Heath, before ending at the A1 near Hatfield. This gave it a total length of 9.7 miles (15.6 km).

The section of the A405 east of Park Street Roundabout was re-designated as part of the A414 (the original St Albans–Hatfield section of that road becoming the A1057).

=== North Orbital Extension ===
In 1976, extending westwards to bypass Rickmansworth, the A405 joined the A412 at Maple Cross.

The original public enquiry was on Wednesday 30 December 1969 in Watford. Chorleywood Urban Council said that the D road would do the job just as well, and did not want the North Orbital extension. The route went through the Chess valley, and ran parallel to Solesbridge Lane. There would be a 60-ft high elevated section. Residents of Chenies opposed one of the routes. The enquiry finished on Friday 16 January 1970.

The route from Maple Cross to Hunton Bridge was published in late March 1971. The North Orbital extension was to be built as a non-motorway road, because the North Orbital was not planned as a motorway by 1973; the proposed extension was due to open by 1974. The South Orbital Road had been named the 'M25' for some years previous to 1971.

But in May 1971, the extension would now be built to motorway standards, which Chorleywood Urban Council disliked. A 'Save The Valley' protest group was formed. Chorleywood Urban Council wanted another enquiry, which took place over six days in June 1972. Chorleywood Urban Council greatly disliked the plans for the A404 junction.

The North Orbital Extension was given the go-ahead in January 1973, from Maple Cross to Hunton Bridge; it was 6.2 miles, and was to cost £6.5m. It opened on Thursday 26 February 1976.

In 1985, this section became part of the M25 motorway between junction 17 and junction 19. Junction 18 in Chorleywood is with the A404 was built in 1978.
