= A roads in Zone 1 of the Great Britain numbering scheme =

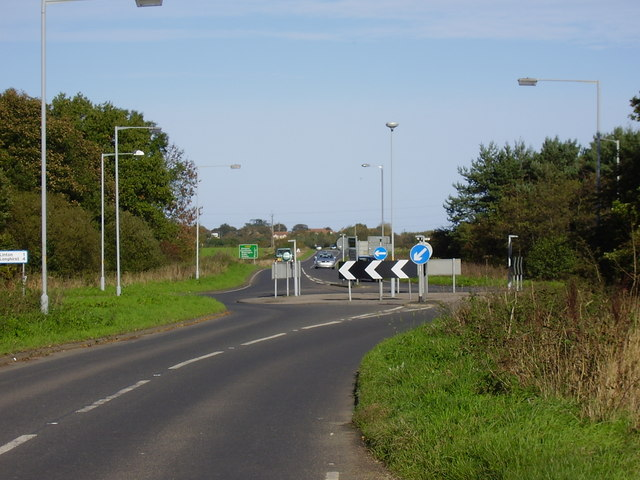
Roundabout on the A189 spine road between Woodhorn and Ellington near to Linton

This is a list of A roads in zone 1 in Great Britain beginning north of the River Thames, east of the A1 (roads beginning with 1).

== Single- and double-digit roads ==
The numbering zones for A-roads in Great Britain

Road	From	To	Notes
A1	A1211 at London Wall, City of London	A7 in Edinburgh	Often called the "Great North Road". London sections of road covered by separate A1 road (London) article. May have originally started at St Paul's Cathedral. Longest road in Great Britain. Parts of the road have been reclassified as the A1(M) motorway.
A10	A3 in City of London (The Monument)	A47 in King's Lynn	Section round Cambridge overlaps M11 and A14.
A11	A1211 in City of London (Aldgate)	A147, Inner Ring Road in Norwich	Section between Bow and Stump Cross (M11 J9) superseded by A12 and M11. Section round Newmarket overlaps A14.
A12	A102 in Blackwall (Blackwall Tunnel)	A47 in Lowestoft	Section round Ipswich overlaps A14. Section between Lowestoft and Great Yarmouth redesignated as A47 in 2017.
A13	A11 in Whitechapel	B1016 in Shoeburyness	Old section of road replaced by A1306 around the Dagenham to Thurrock Bypass. At Canvey Island, road exit is A13, while continuing on current road is A130.
A14	M6, Catthorpe Interchange	A154 at Felixstowe Port	Originally the A14 was the Old North Road, which forms part of the Roman Road known as Ermine Street. It ran from Royston, Hertfordshire through Huntingdon to meet with the A1 south of Alconbury. The Royston-Huntingdon section was renumbered the A1198 to discourage through traffic. The only remaining section of the original 1970's A14 north of Huntingdon, a spur of the A604, was renamed A1307 (along with much of the 1970s A14 road from Cambridge past Huntingdon) following the opening of a second Huntingdon Bypass in 2019.
A15	A1(M) at Norman Cross near Peterborough	A63 in Hessle, near Hull	Crosses Humber Bridge. Used to cross Humber on ferry and run along platform of New Holland railway station.
A16	A180 near docks in Grimsby	A47 in Peterborough	Stretch between Spalding and Peterborough replaced the A1073 which was downgraded because it went on a similar alignment to the bypass, the previous road from Spalding to Stamford becoming the A1175.
A17	A1/A46 at Winthorpe, near Newark-on-Trent	A47 near King's Lynn	Originally started in Swaffham.
A18	A630 in Doncaster	A16 in Ludborough	Largely superseded by M180. The section of M180 between Hatfield and the M18 was designated A18(M) between 1972 and 1979.
A19	A638 north of Doncaster	A1 at Seaton Burn, north of Newcastle upon Tyne.	The section through and north of the Tyne Tunnel was previously the route of the A1.

== Triple-digit roads ==
Road	From	To	Notes
A100	A2 at Bricklayers Arms, South London	A3211 at Byward Street, City of London	Part of the London Inner Ring Road. Crosses Tower Bridge.
A101	A13 at Limehouse	A200 in Rotherhithe	Rotherhithe Tunnel
A102	A2 in Charlton	A107 in Clapton	Includes the Blackwall Tunnel and former A102(M) motorway south of the tunnel. Section between A13 and Hackney Wick redesignated as A12.
A103	A1 in Highbury	A504 in Hornsey	Crosses the route of the former Seven Sisters to Alexandra Palace railway line.
A104	A1 at Islington Green	A121 in Epping, Essex	The northern section of this road, beyond Woodford Green, was originally A11. Passes through Epping Forest.
A105	A104 in Canonbury	A110 Enfield Town	Formerly continued north to end on A10 (now A1010) south of Waltham Cross.
A106	A107 in Hackney	A12 in Wanstead	Formerly ended at Leytonstone, but according to some maps seems to have taken over bits of the old A11 and A12. Originally, the number referred to the A12 Eastern Avenue section.
A107	A11 in Whitechapel	A503 at Manor House	via Hackney and Clapton. Section between Stamford Hill Road (A10) and Seven Sisters Road (A503) originally B106. The section in Hackney was previously B109 and B110 but became A107 when original route (Mare Street) was pedestrianised.
A108	Unused		Was allocated twice. Firstly on what's now the A1080 and A10, from the A105 junction at Wood Green to the A1170 junction at Waltham Cross. Secondly, it was used for what's now the A19 from Seaham to Seaton Burn (at the time, the A19 went on the current A1018). It was sometimes an error for Griggs Approach, which was an extension to the A1083. (Griggs Approach was declassified in 2005).
A109	A1000 in Whetstone	A1010 in Tottenham	Westernmost side off A1000 as Oakleigh Road North, becomes Oakleigh Road South, then re-appears off A1003 Friern Barnet Road as Station Road, across the A406 into Bounds Green Road. To the East of A105 Green Lanes as Lordship Lane crossing the A1080 and the A10 until it hits A1010 Tottenham High Road.
A110	A104 in Woodford Green	A1000 at Barnet	via Enfield
A111	A406/A10 at Palmers Green	A1000 in Potters Bar	Originally continued along current B556 to A5 (now A5183) via South Mimms.
A112	A121, south of Waltham Abbey	A117 at Woolwich Ferry	Passes London City Airport.
A113	A12 at Leytonstone	A128 near Chipping Ongar	Originally continued to A414. Short extension in Leytonstone when A11 downgraded to A1199.
A114	A112 at Plaistow	A104 at Whipps Cross	Part of the North Circular Road until the 1980s relief road (A13) opened.
A115	Unused		Ran from Hackney Wick to Stratford. Eliminated in 2010; now Chapman Road, Rothbury Road, White Post Lane, and Carpenters Road. The original alignment went from Leytonstone to Valentines, which is now mostly part of the A12, which was rerouted along similar roads.
A116	A118 at Manor Park	A114 at Wanstead	The majority of the route formed part of the North Circular Road until the 1980s.
A117	A116 at Aldersbrook	Woolwich Ferry	Woolwich Ferry Approach forms a small part of the North Circular Road. Originally much more of the route formed the North Circular Road. Meets the A112 head-on at Woolwich Ferry.
A118	A12 at Bow	A12 near Romford	Section between Bow and Stratford was A11, with the section east of Stratford forming the original A12. An older one went from Canning Town to Rippleside. This is now part of the A13 (which the old route became an extension of the A124 and A123).
A119	A1170 at Ware	A602 at Watton-at-Stone	See also A602
A120	A10 at Puckeridge	B1352 at Harwich	Section between Marks Tey and Colchester overlaps with A12. Passes Parkeston Quay, terminus for ferries to Denmark and The Netherlands, and Stansted Airport. Runs full length of Harwich Quay then becomes unclassified.
A121	A10 at Waltham Cross	A104 at Woodford Green	via Waltham Cross and Buckhurst Hill
A122	Unused		Ran from Epping to Chelmsford. Rerouted to Hastingwood later. Renumbered as part of the A414 (old route now B183 and A1060). The number is to be reused for the Lower Thames Crossing.
A123	A113 at Chigwell	A13 at Lodge Avenue, Barking	East of Barking town centre (Ripple Road) was the original A13. A13 still uses much of the original (albeit dualled) Ripple Road towards Dagenham.
A124	A13 at Canning Town	B187/B1421 in Upminster	Western section was the original A13 as far as Barking. Originally ran from the A13 in Barking and terminated on A125.
A125	A12 North of Romford	A1306 (former A13) at Rainham	Section at Roneo Corner overlaps with A124. Section in the Romford Ring Road overlaps with A118.
A126	A13 at West Thurrock	A1089 in Tilbury	At junction with A13, only west facing on/off slips are provided. Some maps show A126 continuing to A1089 beyond Dock Road. Originally terminated at Tilbury Riverside Station where a road ferry crossed the Thames to Gravesend. This ferry still runs but for foot passengers only.
A127	A12 at Romford	A13 at Southend	Known as the Southend Arterial Road. Via Basildon; part of the eastern end was A1015. Originally built as single carriageway with provision for dualling later.
A128	A13 at Orsett	A414 in Chipping Ongar	used to run from Tilbury and end on A113. Route from Tilbury now A126 and unclassified.
A129	A1023 near Shenfield railway station	A13 at Hadleigh	Eastbound traffic in Billericay has to use A176 (unsigned) to resume journey on A129. Northbound traffic on the A132 in Wickford wishing to join the eastbound A129 where it multiplexes with the A132 requires a u-turn at the next roundabout.
A130	A12 at Howe Green, near Chelmsford	B1014 at Canvey Island	Used to start at Trumpington, near Cambridge. Originally ended on the A129 near Rayleigh until extended to the A127 and then Canvey Island. In 2008 from Dunmow to Chelmsford the road was downgraded to B1008.
A131	A12 at Boreham Interchange, near Chelmsford	A134 at Sudbury	Much of the one-way system in Sudbury, now the A131, was originally the A134 before the bypass opened. Recently, it replaced the A130 between Little Waltham and Chelmsford.
A132	A13 in Pitsea, Basildon	B1012 near South Woodham Ferrers	Originally allocated to the road from Colchester to Huntingdon (became part of A604, now A1124, A1017, A143, A1307, A14). Current route overlaps with A129 at Wickford.
A133	A1124 (former A12) near Colchester	Clacton-on-Sea, sea front	by way of Elmstead Market, Frating, Great Bentley and Weeley (Main route uses a bypass at Weeley). Has a spur from A12 to A120 at Hare Green. To the East of Hare Green, crosses former A604 (now unclassified). The Colchester bypass was originally the A12 and later became the A604. Continued north to Sudbury from 1929 to the 1970s via what is now the B1508.
A134	A10, south of King's Lynn	A133 in Colchester	Although this road forms the Sudbury bypass, it's the route through the town centre (A131) which has primary status. A spur of the A134 near Stradsett used to link to the A1122 (former A47) at Crimplesham. Later unclassified, this spur is still heavily used to avoid the awful staggered junction with the A1122 at Stradsett a little further north.
A135	A1130/A1305 Ring Road in Stockton-on-Tees	A67 at Egglescliffe	Originally this number belonged to the road from Colchester to Harwich via Manningtree in Essex; this became part of the A1124 and the A604, and is now shared between the A137 and, east of Manningtree B1352. Traffic from Colchester to Harwich is now directed via the A120. The current A135 follows part of the original route of the A19.
A136	A120 in Harwich	Harwich International Port	Originally this ran from Harwich to Clacton. This extended east to Harwich town later where there is another international port. Later, the section southwest of Harwich became part of an extended B1414. Later, this extended north to Parkeston Quay, west of Harwich. The section from the A120 to Harwich Town was later declassified (it is now Parkeston Road and the B1352), leaving the current section from the A120 to Parkeston Quay (Which was later rerouted on the bypass; the old route is now Station Road).
A137	A1214 (former A12) in Ipswich	A133 in Colchester	This road connects the town centre of Ipswich to Old Stoke by going over the Old Stoke Bridge which traverses the tidal section of the River Orwell. Alton Water reservoir covers part of the former route of the A137 at Tattingstone White Horse.
A138	A12 east of Chelmsford	A1114 near Chelmsford city centre	Partly follows first Chelmsford city centre bypass. One-way eastbound between A1114 and first roundabout. Called Chelmer Road. Previously allocated to a road between Ipswich and Shotley Gate (now B1456).
A139	A1305 Ring Road at Stockton-on-Tees	A19 south of Billingham	Previously allocated to a road between Ipswich and Felixstowe where a road ferry crossed to Harwich. (This became the A45 before the bypasses opened. Note the current A14 (ex-A45) uses none of the former route of the A139.) Only south facing slips are provided at the A19 junction. Traffic must use the A1027 to access the northbound A19.
A140	A14 east of Needham Market	A149 near Cromer	part of original route occupied by Norwich Airport runway. Originally started on the then A45 in Claydon and followed current A14 to present starting point.
A141	A47 at Guyhirn	A1 & A14 Brampton Hut	Originally started on the A17 in Kings Lynn and continued to its current starting point at Guyhirn. When the new bridge opened over the River Ouse, the A141 swapped routes with the A47 between Wisbech and Guyhirn. Subsequently, the A47 was diverted onto a new alignment with the former A141 being downgraded to the B1441. This road was later declassified, but was upgraded to the B1542 in 2020.
A142	A141 at Chatteris	A1304 (former A11) at Newmarket	Used to pass under very low (2.7m) bridge at Ely but diverted on to southern bypass which opened in 2018. Previously met A10 at Ely Cathedral.
A143	B1370 at Gorleston on Sea, south of Great Yarmouth	A1017 at Haverhill	Originally started on A12 (now A47) in Gorleston and ended in Bury St Edmunds. Extended along course of B1060 to the A604 in Haverhill. However, in the 1990s, the A604 was downgraded with the A143 taking the route of the former A604 to end on the bypass.
A144	A12 at Darsham	A143 at Bungay	Originally continued to Norwich, the Bungay-Norwich section since renumbered B1332. Passes former RAF Halesworth which is now owned by Bernard Matthews.
A145	A12 at Blythburgh	A146 on Beccles bypass	Originally started in Bungay and ended as now on the A146 but ran via a different route along the East bank of the River Waveney. The road was extended to Blythburgh by the 1930s, when the original section was renumbered the A1116 (now mostly the B1062) to dissuade its use as a through route.
A146	A140, Outer Ring Road in Norwich	A1117 in Lowestoft	Originally ended on A12 in Lowestoft.
A147	Norwich	Norwich	Part of the Norwich inner ring road; previously allocated to a road between Norwich and Cromer (now A140).
A148	A47, southern bypass at King's Lynn	A149 Cromer	Cromer-Mundesley section of B1159 (since reclassified to a C road) was previously part of A148 (1935-1960s). Original western end was on A10/A149 near Knights Hill.
A149	A47 at Great Yarmouth	A148 at Kings Lynn	The dual carriageway section in Great Yarmouth was previously the A47 as was Hardwick Road in King's Lynn. The Ormesby bypass used to be the A1064. Stalham bypass occupies former railway alignment. Passes old AA phone box in layby near Hunstanton.
A150	Unused		Previously allocated to a road between Wisbech and Long Sutton. It is now the A1101 and B1359. The southern end around Wisbech is unclassified.
A151	A1 interchange at Colsterworth	A17 at Holbeach	via Twenty, Bourne (old route now B1193). Pinchbeck Road in Spalding was originally the A16.
A152	A52 in Donington	A16 at Surfleet	Originally terminated on A16 east of Gosberton. Extended to current terminus when the new section of A16 opened in the 1990s. Originally continued west via current A52 to A1.
A153	A607 bypass at Honington	A16 bypass at Louth	Originally passed through Sleaford on the current B1517. At Tattershall, the original river bridge remains but is closed to traffic.
A154	A14 north of Felixstowe	A14 Felixstowe docks	The original alignment went from Mablethorpe to Donington (originally ended in Swineshead) with a spur to Swineshead (now the A52). The current A154 is the original route of the then A45 into Felixstowe, although the final section by the river has been lost to redevelopment.
A155	A153 at Tumby	A16 at West Keal	via Mareham Le Fen and Revesby.
A156	A57 in Drinsey Nook	A631 in Gainsborough	Has two arms in Gainsborough as traffic for A631 eastbound and A159 must turn right after passing under two railway bridges. The main route ahead only provides access to the westbound A631. Partly follows the Foss Dyke.
A157	A158 in Wragby	A1104 in Maltby le Marsh	Original route in Louth now B1200. Multiplexes with A16 along Louth bypass. Original bridge across River Great Eau now a layby. Until 1935, started on A15/A46 in Lincoln which is now mostly the A158.
A158	A15 in Lincoln	A52 in Skegness	Follows former Roman road from Langham to Lincoln. Originally started at A154 (now part of the A52) by Skegness railway station. Section of route towards Lincoln was originally the A157 but then became part of an extended A158 which also used the current A15 route to end on the former A15/A46 junction near Pottergate.
A159	A18 in Scunthorpe	A631 & A156 in Gainsborough	The route in Gainsborough as far as the junction with the B1433 is the original route of the A631. Used to continue into Scunthorpe town centre along now unclassified road. Crosses M180 motorway but without a junction.
A160	A180 at Ulceby, North Lincolnshire	A1173 at Immingham docks	Previously allocated to a road between Croxton and Barrow upon Humber. This road was rerouted via Ulceby to Immingham Docks in 1969, with the old route becoming an extension of the A1077. When the current route was built, the old route became an extension of the A1077 (which was diverted away from the centre of Wootton) and the B1211. About 1 mile long.
A161	A631 on Beckingham bypass	A614 at Goole	Originally this road continued west to Rawcliffe, but the A614 replaced that section when it was rerouted. The section from Beckingham to the A18 near Crowle was originally the B1187 but was upgraded in 1932.
A162	A1(M) at Darrington (Junction 40)	A659 (former A64) at Tadcaster	Although the road commences on the A1(M) there is no connection between the two. The A162 follows the route of the original A1 as far as Ferrybridge. The old A1 continues ahead as the A1246 with traffic for the A162 having to use slip roads. Originally started on former A1 at Brotherton.
A163	A19 near Barlby on Selby bypass	A614 in Holme on Spalding Moor	Originally, this road continued northeast to Driffield, but that section became part of the A614 in 1996.
A164	A15 in Hessle	A614 at Driffield	Originally started in the centre of Hull and used the current B1231 and an unclassified route via Kirk Ella and Willerby. The current route came into use with the opening of the Humber Bridge and Clive Sullivan Way. Used to pass through Beverley and terminated on the A166 in Driffield town centre. Some maps also mark the A164 as continuing to the A63.
A165	A1079 in Kingston upon Hull	A171 north of Scarborough	The non-primary section near Scarborough was the B1262 until the 1920s. Used to pass through Osgodby (near Filey) but that road is no longer open to through traffic south of the village. (A bypass for another village called Osgodby in Yorkshire on the A63 was intended to be built at the same time but this never happened.)
A166	A64 at Grimston Bar, York	A614 on Driffield bypass	Continued to Bridlington until 1996 when the A614 was extended over the Driffield to Bridlington section. Until the opening of the York bypass (A64), started on A66 (later A1079).
A167	A168 at Topcliffe	A1 at Kenton Bar	In County Durham this road largely follows the old course of the A1. Previously allocated to a road between Topcliffe and Thirsk. (now the A168 and B1448). Includes A167(M), the only section of urban motorway built as planned in Newcastle. The section through Newcastle was previously A6127 and A6127(M). Maps show the A167 having two arms north of Gosforth, one towards Westerhope and the other to Kenton. However, only the road towards Kenton is signed.
A168	A659 at Boston Spa	A167 at Northallerton	Originally started at Thirsk but expanded south when the A1(M) opened, using one of the carriageways of the former A1. There is a dispute about whether the dual carriageway section known as the Dishforth Spur is part of the A1(M) or the A168(M). A minor detour south of Boroughbridge was a temporary terminus of the A1(M).
A169	A64 bypass at Malton	A171 west of Whitby	via Vale of Pickering. North Yorkshire Moors Railway follows more or less the same route between Pickering and Whitby. Used to meet A171 at Bagdale but was diverted after the river bridge on the route was washed away in the 1930s. Further changed when Whitby bypass opened in 1972, the A171 taking over the A169 route into Whitby as part of the bypass.
A170	A19 & A168, south-east of Thirsk	A171 & A64 in Scarborough	via Sutton Bank, a 1 in 4 climb in the North Yorkshire Moors. Via Beadlam, Pickering and Thirsk town centre, the latter following the alignment of former A19.
A171	A66 in Middlesbrough	A170 in Scarborough	Originally passed over single lane swing bridge in Whitby (this now has a 17 tonne weight limit) and followed the current B1460 out of Whitby.
A172	A19 at Tontine	A66 in Middlesbrough	The original route through Stokesley is now the B1365. Passes through Marton, birthplace of Captain Cook. Originally terminated on A178 in central Middlesbrough.
A173	A172 bypass at Stokesley	A174 north of Skelton-in-Cleveland	Original route in Stokesley now part of B1257. Previously ran through centre of Guisborough.
A174	A1044 at Thornaby	A171 at Whitby	Plans for road improvements in the Teesside area would have seen the A174 extended to the A66 with a large junction complete with flyovers at the A19 interchange. Non-primary section between Lazenby and Whitby known as 'The Coast Road'. The modern viaduct near the Skinningrove steel works replaced the original Victorian viaduct as part of improvements to the A174.
A175	Unused		Previously a road between South Bank and Normanby. The entire route is unclassified but for several years the A175 ended on the B1380 (the former route of the A174).
A176	A13 in Vange, near Basildon	A129 in Billericay	via Basildon. Previously allocated to a road between Thornaby and Middlesbrough (now old A66).
A177	A1305 & A139 in Stockton	A167 south of Durham	Route through Coxhoe now B6291 with a weight limit. Now uses formerly unclassified Tursdale Road. Originally started on former A1 (later A167, now Front Street) north of Durham following High Carr Road/Durham Road, B6532, A691, North Road, A690, Silver Street, Elvet Bridge, and Hallgarth Street to Stockton Road (then part of the A1051). Section north of A691 was declassified (a portion became the B6532 later). Section from A691 to A690 became an extension of the A691 (which was rerouted on Framwellgate Peth a few years later), truncating the road to the A690. Later rerouted on the New Elvet Bridge. Rerouted on its current route in the 1990s, replacing portions of the A1051 and A1050.
A178	A66 in Middlesbrough	A689 near the harbour in Hartlepool	Crosses the transporter bridge in Middlesbrough. The road between Seaton Carew and Port Clarence was originally a private toll road built by the Tees Concervancy Commission in January 1919 which was only open during daylight hours. It was taken over by the local authority in December 1919 by mutual agreement becoming the A178 in 1923.
A179	A19 near Wingate	A689 in Hartlepool	The A689 and B1376 start at the same roundabout in Hartlepool as the A179. Original route through Hart Village now unclassified.
A180	M180 at Barnetby-le-Wold	A46 near Cleethorpes	Previously allocated to a road between Durham and Byers Garth (now B1198); originally proposed on what is now the A1086. Section from A16 Lock Hill Roundabout (which terminates there) to A46 originally A1031.
A181	A690 at Durham	A19 near Castle Eden	Route in Durham is part of the original A690 alignment. Meets the B1198 near Sherburn House Hospital. The B road has priority there as it was the A180 until the 1970s.
A182	A194(M) near Washington	Unclassified road in Seaham	Currently southbound traffic on the A19 wishing to access the A182 towards Washington must use the next junction (A1086) and pass through Easington Village as no southbound offslip on the A19 is provided at Easington on to the A182.
A183	A1(M), Junction 63 near Chester-le-Street	A194 & A1018 in South Shields	via Sunderland. Crosses Wearmouth Bridge (former A19) in Sunderland. Passes Penshaw Monument, built to resemble a Greek temple.
A184	A1018 (former A19) near Sunderland	A1 at Gateshead Quays Interchange, west of Gateshead	Section between White Mare Pool and A19 was part of A1 when that road used the Tyne Tunnel. Passes Sunderland Greyhound Stadium. Originally started in Newcastle city centre.
A185	A184 Heworth station near Felling	A194 near South Shields	Originally continued to Chichester along current A194, unclassified Dean Street, and B1298 to end on the A19 (now A1018), Westhoe Road. The former route in Chichester is now unclassified. Used to run along now unclassified High Street in Jarrow.
A186	A1, Denton Burn Interchange Newcastle upon Tyne	A192 at Earsdon, North Shields	Originally started on A689 in Pilgrim Street in Newcastle city centre. Ran via Neptune Streetto Wallsend ending back on the A689. A1 to city centre was previously the A6115 and A69. Route east of the A191 was formerly part of the A188.
A187	A193 in Heaton	A193 in North Shields	The roundabout just to the east of the Tyne Tunnels used to provide access for traffic using the tunnel when there was only the one bore. Now only traffic leaving the original tunnel can access it. Originally only ran from the A693 (current A193) in Rosehill to the A192 near the North Shields ferry.
A188	A193 at Byker	A189, near Forest Hall	via Heaton. Originally started on A1 (now B1318) in city centre to end on the A192 in Earsdon. This route now forms part of the A1058. The section from Benton to Earsdon is now part of the A191 and the A186. Section north of the A191 was originally the A1060.
A189	A184 in Gateshead Newcastle upon Tyne	A1068 north of Ashington	St James Boulevard follows the alignment of the planned Central Motorway West. Passes St James's Park, home to Newcastle United FC. Grandstand Road in Town Moor is named in honour of the racecourse which once occupied part of the now protected Town Moor. Passes former Woodhorn colliery, now a museum.
A190	A189 on Dudley bypass, North Tyneside	A193 in Seaton Sluice	Known locally as The Avenue, this was originally the drive to Seaton Delaval Hall which is now owned by the National Trust.
A191	A6085 at Kenton Bar	A193 in Whitley Bay	Originally started on the then A188 in Holystone. Silver Lonnen was originally the B6340. Route from A186 to A188 was originally part of the A188, and route west of A188 was originally the A1059.
A192	A193 in North Shields	A197 bypass north of Morpeth	via Cramlington and Morpeth. Originally ran from North Shields to the then A194 in Shankhouse. Section from Shankhouse to Cramlington was originally part of the A194, and the section from Cramlington to Morpeth was originally the A195.
A193	A1068 in Bedlington	A167(M) in Newcastle city centre	Metro runs in elevated section above central reservation between the River Ouseburn and Byker Metro station. Via Wallsend, Rosehill, North Shields, Tynemouth and Bedlington. Prior to World War II, only ran from Tynemouth to Blyth. The section from Newcastle was the A695, section from Blythe to Bedlington the A194 and section through Bedlington the A1062.
A194	A194(M) in Wardley, Gateshead	A183 in South Shields	Previously allocated to a road between Seaton Burn and Blyth (now A1068, A192, B1505 (former A189), A193, B1329 (former A193)).
A195	A1(M) J64 near Washington	A184 in Wardley	Route originally designated A1231, except for the small section between the A184 and close to the current junction with the A194(M) which was then the end of the A182. The former junction with the A182 no longer exists. The route also has a spur connecting the A195 to the A1(M) at J64, the A195(M), although this is signed as part of the A195. Previously allocated to a road between Morpeth and Plessey Checks. Became a portion of an extended A192 after World War II.
A196	A192 in Morpeth	A197, east of Ashington	via Guide Post. Guide Post to A192 originally A1063. Originally followed what is now A1068 to the then A195 near Plessey Woods and continued east via what is now the A197 to Newbiggin-by-the-Sea
A197	A1 north of Morpeth	B1334 in Newbiggin-by-the-Sea	Originally ended on A196 in Ashington and passed through Pegswood.
A198	A199 in Tyninghame	A1, north of Tranent	Originally terminated on A1 at both ends. Via North Berwick and Whitekirk.
A199	A901 in Leith	A1 on Thistly Cross Roundabout, Dunbar	Joppa to Dunbar originally the route of the A1.

== Four-digit roads ==
=== 1000s ===
Road	From	To	Notes
A1000	A1 in Highgate	A1(M) J6 in Welwyn	Mostly former A1. Previously allocated to a road from the A503 at Finsbury Park Station to the A504 at Muswell Hill which is now part of the A1201.
A1001	A1000 Near Hatfield	A1(M) J4, Oldings Corner roundabout near Welwyn	Was created when the A1 bypass was built and the A1000 was created. Previously allocated to a road along what is now the A10 from the A108 (now A1080) to A10 in Tottenham. At the time, the A10 went north along what is now the A1010. Passes over roof of Hatfield Tunnel.
A1002	Unused		Ran from A10 to A503 in Tottenham. Became part of the A10 one-way system in the 1960s (which was later rerouted onto Monument Way rather than Chesnut Road) and is now part of the A503; at the time, the A503 followed Broad Lane
A1003	A1004 in Southgate	A598 & A1000 in North Finchley	via Friern Barnet.
A1004	A111 in Southgate	A105 in Palmers Green	Passes Broomfield Park.
A1005	A111 near Potters Bar	A110 in Enfield	Previously ended on A1 (current A1000) in Potters Bar.
A1006	A112 in Leyton	A503 at Walthamstow Reservoirs	Passes Blackhorse Road and St James Street railway stations.
A1007	Unused		Ran from A104 to A1199 in Woodford, London along Snaresbrook Road, Eagle Lane and Falcon Way. Eagle Lane was downgraded when the level crossing was removed as part of the construction of the Central line. The remainder was downgraded as part of the M11 construction.
A1008	A12 in Snaresbrook	A114 in Wanstead	Section south of A12 formerly part of the A114. Formerly continued north via High Street to the A11, now the A1199. Cambridge Park originally the A12.
A1009	A406 Cooks Ferry Roundabout in South Chingford	A113 in Woodford	A104 (former A11) to A406 was originally part of the A111. Prior to the 1940s, ran along Snakes Lane.
A1010	A10 at Bruce Grove Station, Tottenham	A121 in Waltham Cross	Former A10 alignment. Previously allocated to a road from Canning Town to North Woolwich (now A1011, Victoria Dock Road, and A112). Original continued along B176 via Cheshunt. Downgraded when the A121 was extended to the new A10.
A1011	A112 in West Ham	A1020 in Silvertown	Portion east of A1020 is now part of A1020. Passes West Ham Station and under the Northern Outfall Sewer in Manor Road. The Greenway walkway lies on top of the sewer.
A1012	A13 in North Stifford	A126 in Grays	There is confusion as to whether the section after the Elizabeth Road roundabout is part of the A126 or A1012. Maps suggest that this is also the A1012 but signage suggests this is the A126. (The A126 originally didn't have a northern deviation in Grays but followed the railway line direct into Grays.)
A1013	A13 near Stanford-le-Hope	A126 in Grays	Former A13 alignment (pre-1980s) between Stanford and Lodge Lane, Grays. The section between Lodge Lane and Grays town centre was the original alignment of the A1013. Lodge Lane between A1013 and A1306 is presently unclassified but was part of the A13 until the 1980s. Locals commonly call this road the "old A13".
A1014	A13 near Stanford-le-Hope	former Coryton Refinery	The oil refinery closed in 2012 and is being redeveloped.
A1015	A129 in Rayleigh	A127 in Eastwood	Originally continued to Southend town centre along current A127.
A1016	A1114 in Widford, Essex	A130 in Springfield, Essex	Previously allocated to a road from Writtle Road (then the A122) to Moulsham Street (then the A12) in Chelmsford via New London Road. Became a portion of the A1113, likely when the first A12 (now the A1114/A138) eastern bypass was built; the route is now part of the B1007. The road in Shoeburyness mistakenly shown as the A1016 is in fact the B1016. Forms Chelmsford western bypass.
A1017	A1307 in Haverhill	A131 north of Braintree	via Gosfield, Ridgewell. Originally ran from A131 to current A1124, most of the rest being the A604.
A1018	A194/A183 in South Shields	A19 near Seaham	Former A19 alignment; a former alignment went along the old A1 through Grantham (now B1174), and the original alignment went from A137 west of Manningtree to Mistley (became A137 spur, now B1352 spur). Part of the route in Sunderland was the B1522 and B1294 prior to the opening of the Sunderland Southern Radial Route and the route is still signed as such at some points, even though the new road opened in 2008.
A1019	A414 in Harlow	A1025 in Harlow	The original A1019 went from Harwich to Parkeston (became part of the A604, later part of the A136, now Parkeston Road and Station Road). Passes Harlow College.
A1020	A1011 / A1026 at Tidal Basin Roundabout near City Hall	A406 in Beckton	The original A1020 went from Great North Road (then the A1) to Crosshall Road (then the A45) in St Neots via St Neots Road. Should the proposed Silvertown Tunnel be built, then the section west of the A1011 junction would become part of the realigned A102. Part of the North Circular Road. An unused bridge just after the A117 junction was intended to link to a new bridge across the Thames. This was cancelled by the then Lord Mayor, Boris Johnson. Lower Lea Crossing reassigned to A1026 after the opening of the Silvertown Tunnel.
A1021	A154 in Felixstowe	A154 in Felixstowe	Formerly part of the A139, the original route into Felixstowe. Previously allocated to a road from Buckden, Cambridgeshire to Brampton (became part of the A141, now a spur of the B1514).
A1022	A1156 St Matthews Street in Ipswich	A1156 Slade Street in Ipswich	Previously allocated to a road in Bury St Edmunds along Westgate Street and Guildhall Street from Crown Street (then part of the A45) to Abbeygate Street (then part of the A45, which the A14 replaced the eastern section of). Part of Ipswich Inner Ring Road.
A1023	A12 Brook Street Interchange (Brentwood)	A12 J12 near Mountnessing	Former A12 alignment. Previously allocated to a road from A47 to A134 in Crimplesham (now Main Road). Partially follows course of Roman road. Via Brentwood.
A1024	A1042, Mile Cross in Norwich	A1074 Dereham Road in Norwich	The section from the A1074 to King Street (the original section) was mostly replaced by the A147, but Earlham Road section is now the B1108 and the Heigham Road section is unclassified.
A1025	M11 J7a	A1169 in Harlow	Previously allocated to a road along what is now the A147 and A1242 from the A146 (now A147) in Norwich via King Street, Koblenz Avenue, and Carrow Road to Thorpe Road (then the A47, now the A1242). Construction of M11 Junction 7A has seen the A1025 replace a section of the B183 between the A414 and the roundabout junction onto the new M11 link road.
A1026	A102 at Greenwich Peninsula	A13 at East India Docks	Previously ran along North Quay and Fuller's Hill (now part of the B1141) in Great Yarmouth from the A12 (now A1243) to the A47 (now Northgate Street). May have been used in Ipswich between the A12 and A1114; this is now part of the A1156. Lower Lea Crossing previously A1020.
A1027	A135 in Hartburn	A139 in Billingham	Previously allocated to a road along Chapel Road in Wisbech. This was redesignated as the B1442 when the A47 was rerouted off of North Brink and Barton Road (which became the B1441), and became the C313 when the B1441 became the C312. Has only existed since 1968 when previously unclassified roads Hartburn Ave, Oxbridge Ave and Bishopton Avenue were upgraded to A road status. Extended in 1974 following opening of new roads carrying the A66 and A19. Yarm Road South previously part of A135.
A1028	A16 at Ulceby Cross	A158 in Candlesby	via Ulceby
A1029	A1077 in Scunthorpe	A18 in Scunthorpe	Previously ended on A159 in town centre. Part of the northern section was the A1077.
A1030	Unused		Ran from the A1243 (former A16) in Nunsthorpe to Cleethorpes; became an extension of the A46 in the 1970s.
A1031	A46, west of Cleethorpes	A1104 in Mablethorpe	Originally Grimsby to Cleethorpes. Section between A46 and Mablethorpe was originally the B1198.
A1032	A1046 near Hemlington	A174 in Portrack	Previously allocated to a road from Hatfield, South Yorkshire to Thorne (became part of the mainline A614, now the A1146). Later allocated to a road from Hoddesdon to St. Margarets (became part of the B180, and is now the C43). Crosses Newport Bridge, a lift bridge which is now locked in position but with the lifting mechanism still in place.
A1033	A1079 in Kingston upon Hull	B1362 in Withernsea	via Hull, Thorngumbald, Patrington. Originally started on A165 in centre of Hull and ended in Hedon.
A1034	A63 on South Cave bypass	A1079 on Market Weighton bypass	Partly follows course of Roman road. Originally started in centre of South Cave village and ended on A66 in centre of Market Weighton.
A1035	B1242 at Hornsea	A1079 near Beverley	Formerly started at A165 at Leven but extended when B1244 was reclassified as A1035 in 2013.
A1036	A64 near Copmanthorpe	A1237 near Huntington	Originally assigned to Low Petergate, Colliergate, Fossgate and Walmgate through downtown, but was shifted to the eastern half of the inner ring road when that was built. (Entire inner ring road now part of A1036). The remainder of the route is the A64 through York prior to the York By Pass.
A1037	A112 in Chingford	A1009 in Chingford	Created in the 1980s. Known as Waltham Way, runs alongside the River Lee Diversion and William Girling Reservoir. Previously allocated to a road from the A165 east to Manor Street in Bridlington (now part of the A1038).
A1038	A165 in Bridlington	A165 near Bridlington	Passes Bridlington Hospital. The original A1038 shared none of the current route running from Old Town to the then separate community of Bridlington Quay.
A1039	A64 east of Staxton	A165 in Filey	via Flixton, Muston. Until around 1925, the section to the east of the A165 was originally the B1259 and B1260.
A1040	Unused		Ran from the A174 north to downtown Redcar; renumbered to B1269 in 1984.
A1041	A614 in East Cowick	A19 in Selby	Previously allocated to a proposed road from Middlesbrough to Redcar, but this was opened as the A1085 instead. The A1041 was instead allocated to a road between Goole and Holme-on-Spalding-Moor (this became part of the A614 which also replaced part of the A161 from Goole to west of Rawcliffe, and the A1041 was reassigned to the old route of the A614).
A1042, (Norwich)	A140 in Norwich	A47 in Norwich	Duplicate number which first appeared in 1992. Part of Norwich outer ring road which used to run down now unclassified Harvey Lane. The easternmost section was part of the A47 until that road was moved on to a new southern bypass in 1992.
A1042, (Redcar)	A174	A1085 near Redcar	This route was first designated in 1924 and connected Kirkleatham and Redcar High Street meeting the northern end of the A1040. It was subsequently extended from Redcar to Marske along part of the current A1085.
A1043	A171 in Nunthorpe	A172 in Nunthorpe	Nunthorpe Bypass. Originally passed through Nunthorpe.
A1044	A67 (former A19) in Yarm	A174 near Thornaby	Originally went northeast along what is now the B1380 between what was previously the A1045 to the A174 at Hemlington. (Some maps still show the A1044 along this section which was downgraded in 2000.)
A1045	Unused		Ran from Thornaby-on-Tees to Stockton-on-Tees. Decommissioned in the early 2000s; the southern half remains an A-road as the A1044 while the southern half has since been downgraded to Class III as the C175.
A1046	A1305 in Stockton-on-Tees	A178 in Port Clarence	Originally started on Stockton High Street (the former A19). Via High Clarence.
A1047	Unused		Ran along Crown Street and East Street in Darlington. Declassified because it was located inside Darlington's ring road.
A1048	A1049 in Hartlepool	A179 Marina Way in Hartlepool	Originally started in centre of West Hartlepool where the other three roads at the crossroads were the A178, A179 and A689. This section is now unclassified following construction of Marina Way.
A1049	A179 at West View, Hartlepool	Northgate Town Square, Hartlepool	Originally started in centre of Hartlepool on A179.
A1050	Unused		Ran from Farewell Hall to Durham. Decommissioned in the 1980s as part of a wholesale renumbering of roads in Durham; the section along South Road is now part of the A177 and the section along Church Street was declassified.
A1051	Unused		Ran from A177 Hallgarth Street to Crossgate. The easternmost section became part of the A177 in the 1980s and the rest declassified when roads in Durham were improved.
A1052	A183 in Houghton Gate	A690 in Houghton-le-Spring	via Fence Houses, High Dubmire
A1053	A174 near Lazenby	Grangetown	Previously allocated to a road from Chester-le-Street from Newcastle Road (then the A1) to Picktree Lane (then the A693, which went west via Pelton Lane); this became part of the A693, and later, when the Chilton bypass was built, also became part of the A167. Ends at Teesport security checkpoint where the only way of turning around is on the roundabout beyond the checkpoint, even though signs indicate this to not be used by the general public.
A1054	A146 in Norwich	A147 in Norwich	Previously allocated to a road from the A19 (now the B1285) east to Seaham (now the B1404 and B1287). Although most maps indicate that Bracondale is a spur of the A147, others claim this road, which was originally part of the A146, is now part of the A1054. (Signs on the ground do not indicate either is correct.)
A1055	A503 in Tottenham Hale	A10 in Waltham Cross	Previously allocated to a road from the A184 east of Gateshead to the A185 in South Shields (now part of the A194). A spur of the A1055, called Conduit Lane, connects the A1055 to the A405 which the main route passes underneath without a junction. The unclassified road at the A10 junction was originally part of the A105.
A1056 (Northumberland)	A1 J79 near North Brunton	A19 near Killingworth	via Wideopen. Sandy Lane was originally part of the B1318. The section between the B1505 (former A189) and A19 was intended to be dual carriageway but only one carriageway has been built.
A1056 (Norwich)	A11 in Norwich	A140 & A146 in Norwich	Previously allocated to a road from A185 in Jarrow via Monkton Terrace (later closed), Grange Road, and Staple Road/Ferry Street to the dock, where the ferry ran. The current Norwich A1056 was created when the A140 was rerouted on to the Outer Ring Road in the 1990s.
A1057	A1001 on Hatfield bypass	A1081 in St Albans	Previously allocated to a road in Newcastle upon Tyne from A695 (this section now part of the A186) via Pilgrim Street and Northumberland Street to the B1318 (then part of the A1). The current A1057 was originally part of the A414. The B6426 in Hatfield was the original route of the A1057 but was also originally part of the A414.
A1058	A167(M) in Newcastle upon Tyne	A193 in Tynemouth	The spur of the A167(M) could be the A1058(M) instead as signs on the spur are blue with the designation A1058. Originally started on A1 Barras Bridge and ran along Jesmond Road. Partly occupies former route of A188. Original terminated by railway station on A193 in Tynemouth running along Queen Alexandra Road and King Edward Road but these are now unclassified.
A1059	Unused		Ran from London Road (this was then A1184, but now B1383) to A1250 in Bishop's Stortford (now South Street, Potter Street, and North Street, with southbound traffic going on Dane Street and Station Road; now the B1529). Previously allocated to a road from Gosforth to Longbenton (now part of the A191).
A1060	A1250 in Bishop's Stortford	A12 near Sandon	Previously allocated to a road from Longbenton to West Moor (now part of the A188, which previously went northeast via the current A191 routing and A186 routing to the A192). Via Little Hallingbury, Hatfield Heath, "The Rodings" and Chelmsford. Originally the B1005 and A414.
A1061	A189 in Shankhouse	A193 in South Beach, Blyth	Originally A192 to A189 near Cramlington. The A189 now occupies part of the original route while a farm track south of the current route was also part of the original A1061. Part of the current route around New Delaval used to be part of the B1237.
A1062	A1151 in Hoveton	A149 east of Potter Heigham	Originally an eastward continuation of the B1354. Previously ended on A149 in centre of Potter Heigham. Previously allocated to a road from Bebside to Bedlington. Renumbered as an extension of the A189 after World War II and is now part of the A193.
A1063			First used for a road from Morpeth to Guide Post. Became part of a rerouted A196 in the 1940s (at the time the A196 went south via the current A1068 to the A192). Next used from the A11 (now B1383) at Sparrows End near Wendens Ambo to the A130 (now B184) Saffron Walden. This was the B1052 before it was upgraded in the 1970s to provide a Class I route into Saffron Walden from the south. Returned to the B1052 when the A11 and A130 were downgraded to Class II due to the M11.
A1064	A47 Acle bypass	A149 Near Caister-on-Sea	Originally Beach Road in Caister-on-Sea, later extended to Acle, but the section on Norwich Road and the original section on Beach Road was declassified when the A149 was rerouted. Entire route was part of A47 until 1935.
A1065	A11 in Mildenhall	A148 near Fakenham	Lakenheath airfield occupies part of former route where the road bends sharply. Via Brandon and Swaffham. Prior to 1922 was part of the B1105.
A1066	A11 near Thetford	A140 east of Diss	via The Forest, Garboldisham, Roydon and Diss. Passes Bressingham Steam Museum. Created in 1924 when the Thetford to Diss section of the B1111 was upgraded. The short section of route east of Diss to Stuston Common was originally part of the B1131 which ended on the now unclassified original route of the A143.
A1067	A1042 (former A140) in Norwich	A148 near Fakenham	Significant portion is now B1454 between Tattersett and Heacham via Docking. Signage in Norwich suggests it starts closer to the A147 at the junction of Pitt Street and New Botolph Street but mapping suggests otherwise. From the 1920s until the construction of RAF Sculthorpe, the A1042 ran along the entire route of the B1154 ending on the A149 in Heacham. This extension was downgraded to the B1454 in the 1960s. Note that the site of the junction of the A148 and B1154 lies under the runway.
A1068	A1 at Seaton Burn	A1 south of Alnwick	via Bedlington, Guide Post, Widdrington and Amble. Originally passed through Red Row and Broomhill and ended on A1 on edge of Alnwick town centre. Partly occupies route of original B1337, B1336 and B1333.
A1069	A110 in Chingford	A104 (former A11) in Buckhurst Hill	Passes Chingford railway station. Via Epping Forest.
A1070	A1072 in Stevenage	A602 in Stevenage	Previously allocated to a road from the A12 (now the A1124) in Colchester to the A133 in Greenstead. This was the B1026 before it was upgraded to Class I status. Downgraded back to Class II as the B1422 in the 1940s, but is now an extension of the A134. Another disputed A1070 was on Fairland Way in Stevenage; this is now the A1155. Just before the A602 roundabout a grassed over bridge carrying a cycle path can be seen on the left. This bridge was once part of the A1.
A1071	A134 southeast of Sudbury, Suffolk	A1214 near Ipswich Hospital	via Hintlesham and Ipswich. The original A1071 took over the route of the B1069 and ran along Hadleigh Road ending on the original A12. The gap in continuity in the town centre stems from the A45 being diverted along what had been originally the A12 and A139 in 1935. When the A45 was diverted on to the bypass (current A14), the A1071 was extended to its current terminus.
A1072	A602 spur in Stevenage	A1175 in Stevenage	Previously allocated to a road from Witcham Toll to Stretham; this was the B1087 and B1085 before they were upgraded to Class I. The entire route was renumbered to A1123 in 1935, but it was later discovered that giving the A1123 a branch was foolish, so the north–south section (the former B1087) was renumbered to A1421.
A1073	Unused		Ran from Eye to Spalding. It was downgraded to two C-roads, because the bypass was open, but the new bypass became part of the A16 road, while the old route of the A16 became the A1175.
A1074	A47 at New Costessey	A147 in Norwich	Previously part of the A47 prior to the construction of the Norwich southern bypass. The original A1074 was from the current A1074 (then part of the A47) north to the A147 (now A1402); this became an extension of the A1024 by the end of the 1920s. Next used on the Norwich Outer Ring Road; renumbered to the A47 in the 1970s when it was rerouted away from the center of Norwich.
A1075	A1066 in Thetford	A47 near East Dereham	Previously allocated to a road from Donington to Baythorpe. Became part of the A154 in 1935 and is now part of the A52. The A1075 was an upgrade of the B1110 and has been extended along the former A11 through Thetford town centre. Note the original alignment of the B1110 between Thetford and Hatton was requisitioned by the army in 1942 as part of the Stanford Battle Area with the B1110 diverted on to previously unclassified roads.
A1076	A148 in Gaywood	A149 in Kings Lynn	Previously allocated to a road from Gunness to Scunthorpe. The western section became part of the A18 in 1935 (at the time, the A18 went east from Gunness via what is now the B1450) and the remainder became an extension of the A1029 (now declassified and partially pedestrianized) to remove the triple point in Scunthorpe. The current A1076 was originally part of the B1145 and was upgraded when the bypass opened. Some signs still indicate this route as the B1145.
A1077	M181 near Scunthorpe	A160 in South Killingholme	Originally started in centre of Scunthorpe where the other roads were the A1076 and A1029. Via Risby Warren, South Ferriby, Barton-upon-Humber, Barrow-upon-Humber.
A1078	A148 in Kings Lynn	A148 in South Wootton	Passes the docks. Previously allocated to a road from Guide Post to west of Ashington; this was the B1333 before it was upgraded to Class I status. Now part of the A1068.
A1079	A1036 inner ring road in York	A63 near Kingston upon Hull	Newland Avenue in Hull has a pub alongside a railway bridge made from part of a former railway carriage. Passes close to the University of Hull. Originally passed through Beverley along a now unclassified road. Via Bishop Burton, Shiptonthorpe and Hayton. The entire route is part of the pre-1922 route of the A66.
A1080	A105 at Turnpike Lane Underground station	A10 at Tottenham	Formerly a portion of the A108. Traffic on the A1080 can only turn on to the northbound A10 in Tottenham. The original route went from the A11 (now Broadway) to the A12 (now Broadway) in Stratford. Became a spur of the A118/The Grove in 1935.
A1081	Luton Airport	A1000 in High Barnet	Previously allocated to present A1400 and A406 from Gants Hill to Walthamstow Forest. This road was originally the A6. Its actual numbering is curious because it is out of zone although it may be due to the rerouting of the A1 and curtailment of the A6 in the 1950s. Maps but not signs indicate the A1081 continues through the tunnel under the airport.
A1082	A148 south of Sheringwood	A149 at Sheringham	Previously numbered as the B1158; original location was on what is now the western half of the Whipps Cross Roundabout. Shortly after the junction with the A148 is a turning on the right which was the original route of the B1158, the current route being created when the road was upgraded to A road status.
A1083	A124 in Becontree Heath	A118 in Ilford	Originally the B176, it was extended along Griggs Approach, a new bridge across the railway line, in 1985 but this was downgraded to unclassified in 2005.
A1084	A18 (originally A15) near Brigg	A1173 near Caistor	Originally the B1209, it used to end on the A46 in Caister town centre but was extended along Grimsby Road to its current terminus when the A46 bypass opened.
A1085	A172 in Middlesbrough	A174 south of Marske-by-the-Sea	Most of this road wasn't built until the 1920s. During construction of the Middlesbrough to Redcar section it was designated as the A1041 but was numbered A1085 upon opening. However the route was subsequently changed with the westernmost part becoming the A172 and the A1085 diverted to run past Albert Park. This was later declassified but the B1272 still ends on the Albert Park route.
A1086	A19 in Easington	A179 in Hartlepool	This road was built in the 1920s and was allocated the number A180 in the 1922 roads list. However, none of the A1086 has ever actually been the A180. The original route was as now from the A179 but in West Hartlepool and ending on the B1283 at Easington Colliery. In more recent times, the A1086 in Easington has swapped routes with the B1283. The connection to the A19 was originally a spur of the A182.
A1087	A199 in Beltonford	A1 near Broxburn	Numbered B1345 until late 1920s. Originally started on A1 rather than A199, the change being made as part of the upgrade of the A1. Via Dunbar (which the A1 has always bypassed) and John Muir Country Park.
A1088	A14 J47 east of Woolpit	A1066 in Thetford	Originally the B1112, it was upgraded in the 1920s. It mostly follows the boundary between Norfolk and Suffolk. Passes through the village of Euston. The local peer also owned land in London and named the area around what is now the A501 after this village. Originally met the A143 in Ixworth town centre but both roads now bypass it, part of the old A143 being closed to traffic. A layby near Stowlangtoft once formed a hairpin bend on the route. The road originally ended on the original A45 west of Woolpit.
A1089	A13 at Orsett Heath	Tilbury Cruise Terminal	This is the Trunk Road into Tilbury (and not the A13!) Previously allocated to the current B149 from Little Thurrock to Chadwell St Mary. The unclassified road heading east towards Tilbury at the A126 roundabout was originally a continuation of the A126. (It was downgraded with the removal of the A128 from the Tilbury area.)
A1090	A1306 near Purfleet	A126 in West Thurrock	Created in 2013, when the old A1090 along New Tank Hill Road and London Road in Purfleet was declassified. The Purfleet bypass was originally the A126 but became unclassified when the A126 was diverted to the current A13 in the 1990s.
A1091	Unused		Originally the B1006, it ran along Lordship Road in Writtle from A414 (now A1060) to Ongar Road (then the A122). Became a part of the A414 between 1978 and 1982, but was downgraded in 1986 following general renumbering around Chelmsford after the bypass opened.
A1092	A1017 in Baythorne End	A134 Long Melford	Originally numbered B1062, the road originally ended in the centre of Long Melford on the A134, both forks either side of the village green being the A1092 at that time. The current A1092 only uses the left fork, the main route ahead is the B1064.
A1093	Unused		Originally the B1080, it ran from Main Road (then part of the A12, which went west via the current A1214) in Martlesham to west of Kirton (now Felixstowe Road, Gloster Road, Barrack Square, and Brightwell Road)
A1094	A12 near Stratford St. Andrew	Aldeburgh	Originally ended at the Moot Hall, Aldeburgh and designated B1121, it was extended to its current terminus in the 1920s.
A1095	A12 near Blythburgh	Market Square in Southwold	Originally part of the B1123. The unclassified continuation of the route in Southwold, Queen Street, leads to the ferry across the River Blythe. This ferry service was once a vehicle ferry but now is foot passengers only.
A1096	A1123 at Galley Hill	A1307 (former A14) near St Ives	Most of the route was part of the B1040 (which now multiplexes along the entire route) and was upgraded in the 1970s including a new bridge in St Ives. Previously allocated to a road from Acle to Great Yarmouth; this was the B1140 before it was upgraded to Class I status. Because the route was a shortcut to the A47, it was renumbered as a portion of the A47 in 1935 (at the time the A47 went via the current A1064 and A149 to Great Yarmouth).
A1097	Defunct		Running between A157 (now B1200) and A16 (now B1502), it directed traffic heading between the west and the north away from Louth town centre along St Mary's Lane. Downgraded in 1991 to a spur of the B1200 when the Louth bypass opened.
A1098	A16 in New Waltham	A46 & A180 in Cleethorpes	via Cleethorpes sea front. When first opened in the 1920s, passed through New Waltham along current B1198. At 4.3 miles (6.9 km), it has junctions with the A1031 road at Hewitts Circus and B1219 road.
A1099	A1060 in Chelmsford	A1060 in Chelmsford	Partly uses a section of the former A12, Springfield Road.

=== 1100s ===
Road	From	To	Notes
A1100			Ran from A12 in Copdock to A45 in Great Blakenham. Downgraded to the B1113 due to completion of the A45 (now A14) Ipswich Western Bypass; the spur to Claydon and the route north of Copdock are unclassified.
A1101	A1302 in Bury St. Edmunds	A17 in Long Sutton	Longest 4 digit A road in the country. Runs via Wisbech, Littleport, Barton Mills. Part of the original route lies under the runway of RAF Mildenhall. The road was formed from sections of the A150, A47 and B1101 in the 1920s. The section into Bury St Edmunds is the original line of the A143.
A1102			Was the original Lincoln northern bypass, which became the B1273 and a southeastward extension of the B1182 when the newer A46 and A158 Lincoln bypass opened.
A1103	A631 north of West Rasen	A46 east of Osgodby	Originally the B1204. Upgraded in the 1920s.
A1104	A16 at Ulceby Cross	High Street in Mablethorpe	The end of the route in Mablethorpe is also the end of the A52. Via Alford, Maltby-le-Marsh. Until the late 1920s was the B1196, B1197, B1198 and B1199.
A1105	A15 near Kingston upon Hull	A1079 near Hessle	Created in 1930 from part of the A164 (Anlaby Road) which had ended on the A63 Midland Street, a short distance from the current A1079, and the newly built Hessle bypass. In the late 1940s the A1105 (which had since been extended to Hull City centre) and A63 swapped routes. Recent improvements to roads in the area have seen the A1105 revert to part of its old route although part of the original route is unclassified while Hessle Road is partly the A1166 and A63.
A1106			Ran from Pinchbeck Road (then the A16) to Commercial Road (then the A151) in Spalding via Elloe Avenue. Became part of the A151 as the road allowed east–west traffic to bypass Spalding.
A1107	A1 near Cockburnspath	A1 near Burnmouth	The section between Burnmouth and Eyemouth was originally the B1343 and originally passed through Burnmouth village on a now unclassified road to join the A1 further east.
A1108	A193 in Chirton	A1058 in Billy Mill, North Shields	Originally part of the B1316. Runs along Billy Mill Avenue and Regent Terrace.
A1109			Ran from Lincoln Road in New England, Peterborough to Eastfield Road in Newark, Peterborough. Exact route is uncertain but assumed to have run via St. Pauls Road, Dogsthorpe Road, Elmfield Road, and Newark Avenue. It is presumed to have been downgraded following the rerouting of the A15 and A47. Previously allocated to a road from the A175 (now Normanby Road) in South Bank to the A1085 in Grangetown. This became the B1446 and is now Middlesbrough Road, Eston Road, A66 and A1053.
A1110	A109 in New Southgate	A406 in Arnos Grove	The western section of Bowes Road that passes through Arnos Grove.
A1111	A1104 in Alford	A52 in Sutton-on-Sea	Subject of the song 'the A1111' by John Shuttleworth, the stage persona of Graham Fellows. Previously allocated to another road elsewhere, but it is unknown where the previous route was. The current A1111 was originally unclassified but in the 1920s became the B1197. The route was upgraded to A road status in the late 1950s.
A1112	A113 west of Abridge	A125 in Dagenham	Southern section used to follow what is now A1240, and formerly, north of the A12 it was B196 as far as Hainault Forest and north of there part of a much longer B174, while south of the A124 it was part of a much longer B178.
A1113			Ran from A1099 to A138 in Chelmsford along the former A12 when the original bypass opened. When the current bypass opened, the route was downgraded to the B1137.
A1114 (Chelmsford)	A414 in Widford, Chelmsford	A12 in Howe Green, Chelmsford	Previously allocated to a road from A12 (now A1071) in Ipswich to A45 (now A1156) as the Ipswich north bypass. The section from west A1071 junction to east A1071 junction became part of the A12 (now the A1214), leaving the section from the A12 to the A45. The remaining section became part of the A45 (now the A1189) later.
A1114 (Gateshead)	A184 in Teams, Gateshead	A694 in Swalwell near Blaydon	
A1115			Ran from Winceby (original west end was at Spilsby) to Scremby. The section west of Spilsby was renumbered as an extension of the B1195 and the remainder (the original section) declassified in 1988.
A1116			Ran from downtown Beccles to the A144 in Bungay along the former A145. Much of the route was downgraded to an extension of the B1062, the section in Bungay is now part of the B1435 and the section in Beccles declassified when Bungay and Beccles were bypassed.
A1117	A12 in Pakefield, Lowestoft	A47 (former A12) in Oulton, north of Lowestoft	Forms Lowestoft bypass. Passes Oulton Broad Station. Originally the B1129 (between Oulton Broad and Blundeston). Previously passed through Oulton village along the current B1375. The A146 originally multiplexed with the A1117 rather than starting on it.
A1118			Was a loop around the A12 (now B1532) in Lowestoft via Marine Parade. Became part of the B1532 one-way system.
A1119			Ran from Lincoln Road (then the A15) in Peterborough via Burghley Road and Crawthorne Road to Eastfield Road (then the A47). Declassified in the 1970s when the A-roads it connected were rerouted as part of upgrades to the Peterborough road network. Previously allocated to another road elsewhere, but it is unknown where the previous route was.
A1120	A1308 in Stowmarket	A12 near Yoxford	Signed as a Tourist Route with brown signs. Via Stowupland, Forward Green, "The Stonhams", Pettaugh, Earl Soham and Yoxford. The road came into existence in the 1950s from parts of the B1114, B1115 and B1120. The original terminus was on the A45 (now A1308) in Stowmarket town centre. Previously allocated to a road in Cambridge from Newnham Road (then the A603) to Newmarket Road (then the A45). Renumbered as an eastern extension the A603 in 1935 and is now part of the A1134/A603 multiplex.
A1121	A52 in Boston	A17 in Swineshead Bridge	Previously allocated to another road elsewhere, but it is unknown where the previous route was. Originally unclassified it became the B1371 in the 1920s and was upgraded in the 1950s. Virtually dead straight.
A1122	A1101 in Outwell	A47 near Swaffham	Most of the route was the A47 until 1935 when it was rerouted via Kings Lynn. Via Downham Market and RAF Marham. The point where it meets the A47 was the original eastern end of the A17.
A1123	A141 bypass at Huntingdon	A142 bypass at Soham	via Earith, Bluntisham, Stretham and Wicken. The Hartford to Stretham section was the B1085, the rest unclassified, until about 1925. The Haddenham to Witcham Toll section of the A1421 was originally a spur of the A1123.
A1124	A1017 in Sible Hedingham	A134 in Colchester	Original section on East Street and Greenstead Road was declassified when the A134 was rerouted. Most of the current route was originally the A604. The section from the current A12 (junction 26) into Colchester was originally part of the A12. Via Halstead and Earls Colne.
A1125			Actual route is uncertain but it's assumed to have run from Thorpe Road (then part of the A47) in Peterborough via Thorpe Park Road, Grange Road, and Westfield Road to the B1380 Westwood Street. Westwood Street no longer exists having been replaced by the A15 Bourge Boulevard.
A1126			Ran from the A14 (later A604 spur, now A1307) in Huntingdon to the A141 (now B1514) east of Huntingdon. One section became part of the A141 northern bypass while the rest was downgraded to Class II status as the B1044 and B1519 as it was in Huntingdon town center.
A1127			Ran from downtown Peterborough on the A15 to Eastfield Road (then part of the A47) via Broadway. Declassified in the late 20th century.
A1128			Ran from the A1126 (now B1044 Ermine Street) to the A141 (now Hartford Road) in Huntingdon via Cromwell Walk and Brookside. Downgraded to the B1514 as it was in Huntingdon town center.
A1129	A605 in Fletton	A15 near Woodston, Cambridgeshire	Partly occupies original route of A605 (later downgraded to B1092) which ran down Fletton High Street and turned into Princes Road. (No evidence of this remains.) The A1129 originally continued along New Road to end back on the A605.
A1130	A1305 Ring Road in Stockton-on-Tees	A1032 in Acklam	via Thornaby. The A1130 originally consisted solely of Levick Crescent in Acklam.
A1131			Ran from Milton Road (then the A10) to Parker Road (A603) in Cambridge via Victoria Avenue, Emmanuel Road, and Parker Street. It was originally numbered B1047 and was upgraded in the late 20th century. Declassified because it was within Cambridge's inner ring road.
A1132			Ran from Cambridge to Chesterton via Chesterton Road.
A1133	A46 northeast of Newark-on-Trent	A156 in Torksey	Originally passed through Winthorpe but the route was severed by improvements to the A1. Via Collingham, Besthorpe, Newton-on-Trent and Laughterton. The route was the B1186 until 1960.
A1134	Cambridge	Cambridge	The Cambridge Ring Road. An unbuilt section was a bridge over the River Cam linking the A1303 and A1309. Originally used Coldhams Lane, avoiding most of Newmarket Road.
A1135			Ran on the old alignment of the A47 through Wisbech. Downgraded to the B198.
A1136	A180 in Healing	A16 in Grimsby	via Little Coates. Previously the B1361 (unclassified until 1920s), the road was upgraded in the 1940s. Originally continued to Immingham along current B1210.
A1137	A52 in Boston	A16 in Boston	
A1138	A16 in Boston	Boston Docks	
A1139	A47 in Eye	A(1)M junction 17 in Orton, Peterborough	Doubles as Fletton Parkway, part of Peterborough's Parkway system and a major part of the city's road network.
A1140	A1 in Piershill, Edinburgh	A199 in Portobello, Edinburgh	
A1141	A134 near Stanningfield	A1071 in Hadleigh	Originally the B1070 until it was upgraded in the 1960s. Originally ended in Hadleigh on the old A1071 and was shortened when the A1071 bypass was built. This section became the B1070 again.
A1142			Ran from St. John's Street/Cornhill (then the A45) east via Brentgovel Street and Looms Lane to Northgate Street (then the A134) in Bury St Edmunds. Now declassified and partially pedestrianized.
A1143			Ran on St. Mary's Road and Peddars Lane in Beccles from Ballygate east to Blyburgate, cutting the corner between the-then A1116 (now B1062) and A146; route was previously B1383. Following extensive renumbering in the area, the section along St Mary's Road became the eastern section of the B1062 and the section along Peddars Lane is part of the A145 one-way system.
A1144	A1117 in Oulton	A47 in Lowestoft	
A1145	A146 in Carlton Colville	A12 in Pakefield, Lowestoft	
A1146	A18 in Hatfield	A614 in Thorne	Former A1032 (later A614).
A1147	A189 in Bedlington	A196 in Stakeford	Was B1330 before 1975.
A1148	A192 in Wellfield	A193 in Whitley Bay	
A1149	A187 in North Shields	A193 in North Shields	
A1150	A167 in Harrowgate	A66 in Great Burdon	Former B1256
A1151	A147 in Norwich	A149 east of Dilham	Passes through Wroxham, the 'capital' of the Norfolk Broads
A1152	A12 in Woodbridge	B1069 in Rendlesham	Former routing of B1069 and B1084. Serves long-defunct RAF Bentwaters.
A1153	A13 east of Barking	A124 in Becontree	Short link road connecting the A13 at Ripple Road to the A124 at Martins Corner
A1154			Planned link road in Great Yarmouth connecting the A12 to the A1243.
A1155	A1072 in Stevenage	A1072 in St Nicholas, Stevenage	
A1156	A14 at Whitehouse, Ipswich	A12/A14 at Bucklesham	Former A45.
A1157			Ran on the Darlington ring road; became part of the A68 and A167 when the A68 was extended and the A167 was rerouted out of the city centre.
A1158	A13 in Westcliff-on-Sea	A127 in Eastwood	
A1159	A13 in Thorpe Bay	London Southend Airport	
A1160	A13 in Southend-on-Sea	B1016 on Southend waterfront	Short link road from A13
A1161			Ran on the old alignment of the A122 (which was rerouted further north) from Epping to North Weald Bassett. Downgraded to an eastern extension of the B181 when the A11 was downgraded to Class II.
A1162			Ran from the A1102 (now B1273) to the A15 in Lincoln. Was part of the B1398 before it was upgraded to Class I status in the 1970s. Downgraded back to Class II as the B1308 in the 1980s.
A1163			Ran from the A1164 (now A1079) to the A165 (now Clarence Road) in Kingston upon Hull via Jameson Street, George Street, and Witham. The eastern half became part of the A165 mainline in the 1980s due to completion of the A165 while the rest was declassified and is now mostly pedestrianized.
A1164			Ran from the A63 (now Alfred Gelder Street) to the A1079 (now Prospect Street) in Kingston upon Hull via Carr Lane/Anlaby Road and Ferensway. Became a portion of a rerouted A1079 when in the 1980s when Ferensway was upgraded; the remainder was declassified.
A1165	A63 in Kingston upon Hull	A1079 in Newland, Kingston upon Hull	
A1166	A1105 in Anlaby Park	A63 in Dairycoates, Kingston upon Hull	
A1167	A1 in Berwick-upon-Tweed	A1 in Scremerston	Previously allocated to a road from Boroughbridge to Green Hammerton. This was part of the A66 until 1924 and then the A167 until 1935 before it was renumbered to A1167 during World War II after the A167 was split in two. Downgraded to the B6265 in the 1960s due to completion of the A1 (now A1(M)) Boroughbridge bypass.
A1168	A113 near Chigwell	A121 in Loughton	Formerly B171
A1169	A414 in Potter Street, Harlow	A414 in Harlow town	
A1170	A10 in Ware	A10 in Turnford	
A1171	A19 in Annitsford	A192 in Cramlington	
A1172	A1068 in Cramlington	A1171 in Cramlington	
A1173	A46 in Caistor	A160 near Immingham	It is 11 miles long.
A1174	A1079 in Dunswell	A1079 near Bishop Burton	This road includes the notorious Grovehill Junction, which has 42 traffic lights.
A1175	A16 in Spalding	A1 in Stamford	Previous route of A16 road between Spalding and Stamford, before completion of the A1073 upgrade.
A1176	A59 in York	A19 in York	Follows Water End.
A1177			Ran from A1105 in Hessle to A164 (now Springfield Way/Gorton Road) in Anlaby; formerly the northern end of the B1232. Renumbered as part of a rerouted A164 in 1984 and returned to the B1232 in 1991.
A1178			Temporary designation for what is now the M25 between junctions 23 (South Mimms) and 24 (Potters Bar). Would have been part of the planned M16 (Ringway 3).
A1179	A15 in Peterborough	A1260 in Longthorpe	
A1180			Ran from High Street (then the A46, later the B1262, which was declassified in 2017) to Newark Road (then the A46, now the A1434) in Lincoln. Downgraded to the B1003 (now A1192) by the 1990s due to completion of the Lincoln Bypass; the section along Dixon Street became the B1360 and is now declassified.
~~A1181~~ - ~~A1183~~			Unused
A1184	A120 in Bishops Stortford	A414 in Harlow	Most of this formed the old A11 route between the two towns
A1185	A689 in Wolviston	A178 at Seal Sands	
~~A1186~~ - ~~A1187~~			Unused
A1188			Was once reserved for a road with a description of "A406 (T) Woodford Avenue". The A1400 number was used instead.
A1189	A1214 at Rushmere St. Andrew	A14 at Nacton	
A1190			Ran from High Street (then the A46, later the B1262, which was declassified in 2017) to Canwick Road (then the A158, now the A15) in Lincoln; originally part of the B1193. Became the eastern end of the A57 when the A46 was rerouted away from Lincoln and the A15 rerouted back into Lincoln. Now part of the B199 after the A57 was rerouted.
A1191	Proposed		Was a proposed road from A1052 in Houghton-le-Spring to B1284 in Rye Hill, and would have probably taken over the B1284 to the A690. It has since been subsumed into a more extensive long-term plan to bypass and reroute the A182 on new construction from Shiney Row to A19 east of Murton via the Central Route, Hetton Bypass and the partially complete East Durham Link Road.
A1192	A57 in Lincoln	A1434 in North Hykeham	New route created in 2017; replaced part of the B1003.
~~A1193~~			Unused
A1194	A1042 east of Norwich	A1270 east of Norwich	Broadland Gate Link
~~A1195~~ - ~~A1197~~			Unused
A1198	A505 in Royston	A1307 in Godmanchester	Original route of the A14
A1199 (Islington)	A1201 near Highbury	A104 in Canonbury	
A1199 (Woodford)	A12 in Leytonstone	A104 in Woodford	Uses the former path of the A11.

=== 1200s and higher ===
Road	From	To	Notes
A1200	A501 in Shoreditch	A1 in Islington	
A1201	A1 in Islington	A504 near Alexandra Palace	
A1202	A501 in Shoreditch	A1203 near St Katharine Docks	Part of the London Inner Ring Road
A1203	A100 at Tower Hill	A1261 in Poplar	Includes East Smithfield, The Highway and the Limehouse Link tunnel. Number seems also to refer to Butcher Row, a spur that connects to the A13 at Limehouse
A1204	A100 at Tower Hill	A1203 in Shadwell	Previously ran along Wapping High Street and Wapping Wall. Now unclassified.
A1205	A106 in South Hackney	A13 in Limehouse	Burdett Road and Grove Road, crosses A11 at Mile End station.
A1206	A1261 in Limehouse	A13 in Blackwall	This is a crescent-shaped round around the Isle of Dogs. If you actually want to go from Limehouse to Blackwall you would use the A1261
A1207	A107 in Hackney	A104 in Dalston	Graham Road with Western boundary at Queensbridge Road where the A104 temporarily heads northbound.
A1208	A10 in Shoreditch	A107 in Cambridge Heath	Hackney Road.
A1209	A10 in Shoreditch	A107 in Bethnal Green	Bethnal Green Road
A1210	A100 at Tower Hill	A11 at Aldgate	One-way section of the London Inner Ring Road, mostly Mansell Street, with links via Minories and Goodman's Yard
A1211	A1 at Barbican	A1210 at Aldgate	
A1212			Ran from A1213 (Gracechurch Street) to A11 (Leadenhall Street) in London via Fenchurch Street. Now declassified.
A1213	Threadneedle Street, London	King William Street	Entirely concurrent with A10.
A1214	A12/A14 at Copdock	A12 in Martlesham	Former route of A12, prior to Ipswich Southern/Eastern by-pass
~~A1215~~ - ~~A1230~~			Unused
A1231	A1(M) at Birtley	A183 in Sunderland	Also known as the Sunderland Highway
A1232	A133 in Colchester	A12/A120 near Colchester	Former A12 alignment through northern Colchester. See also A120
~~A1233~~ - ~~A1234~~			Unused
A1235	A176 in Basildon	A132 in Basildon	Cranes Farm Road, parallels the A127 and the A1321 between the A176 and A132 roads.
~~A1236~~			Unused
A1237	A64 in Copmanthorpe	A64 in Stockton-on-the-Forest	York Outer Ring Road (Western & Northern)
A1238	A63 in Thorpe Willoughby	A19 in Selby	
~~A1239~~			Unused
A1240	A124 in Becontree	A1306 in Dagenham	Formerly part of the A1112, which was rerouted to the east. Passes by Dagenham Heathway tube station.
A1241			Ran from the A10 to the A121 (now B156) west of Cheshunt. Downgraded to a portion of the B198 by 1983.
A1242	A147 in Norwich	A1042 in Thorpe St Andrew	Previously part of the A47 prior to the construction of the Norwich southern bypass.
A1243 (Great Yarmouth)	A47 in Great Yarmouth	Great Yarmouth harbour	Shares the same number with Scartho Road and a stretch of Louth Road to the south of Grimsby. See Anomalously numbered roads in Great Britain
A1243 (Grimsby)	A1136 in Grimsby	A16 in New Waltham	
A1244			Reserved for the Northern Gateway Access Road near Waltham Abbey. It would go from the A1055 to A121 if built.
A1245	A130 at South Benfleet	A132 at Battlesbridge	Previously the A130
A1246	A63 near Ledsham	A162 in Brotherton	Previously part of the A1
~~A1247~~ - ~~A1249~~			Unused
A1250	A120 in Bishops Stortford	A120 in Bishops Stortford	Forms the "main road" connecting Bishops Stortford (town centre) to the A120.
A1251	A125 in Romford	A118 in Romford	Forms part of the Romford Ring Road.
~~A1252~~ - ~~A1259~~			Unused
A1260	A15 in Hampton, Peterborough	A47 in Longthorpe, Peterborough	
A1261	A13 in Limehouse	A13 in Leamouth	Aspen Way, East India Dock Link tunnel, and West India Dock Road in Docklands
A1262			Ran on the Aspen Way Tunnel in London Docklands from the A1261 to the A13. Now part of the A1261.
A1263			Ran on Leamouth Road in London Docklands from the A13 to the A1020. Now part of the A1020, although it is shown as A1263 on 1:10k OS maps.
~~A1264~~ - ~~A1269~~			Unused
A1270	A1067 in Taverham	A47 in Postwick	Norwich Northern Distributor Road
~~A1271~~ - ~~A1289~~			Unused
A1290	A1231 in Hylton Red House	A1018 in Monkwearmouth	Sections (east to west) known as Southwick Road, Keir Hardie Way, Queen's Road, Wessington Way
~~A1291~~ - ~~A1299~~			Unused
A1300	A194 in Jarrow	A183 in Marsden	John Reid Road, South Shields southern ring road
A1301	A1309 in Trumpington	M11 in Great Chesterford	Previously allocated to a road from Sadlers Farm to Canvey Island. This became part of the A130 and B1014 (the old B1014 became part of the A130). The current A1301 was created on a former section of the A130 when sections of the A130 were downgraded when the parallel M11 was built.
A1302	A14 in Westley	A134 in Bury St Edmunds	
A1303	A428 at Madingley	A1304 near Newmarket	Former A45
A1304	A11 at Six Mile Bottom	A11/A14 north of Newmarket	Former A11
A1305	Stockton-on-Tees	Stockton-on-Tees	Stockton town centre's ring road.
A1306	A13 in Dagenham	A1012 in Chafford Hundred	Former A13 alignment, with unclassified Lodge Lane connecting to the A1013. Eastern section was the main route until the 1980s. Western section was the main route until as recently as the late 1990s. Along with the A1013, locals commonly refer to this road as the "old A13".
A1307	A(1)M at Alconbury	A143 in Haverhill	Formerly A604 and before that A132. Follows the old route of the A14 from the A1(M) motorway (A1307 spur) at Alconbury past Huntingdon railway station continuing south through Cambridgeshire often parallel to the A14 allowing local traffic to bypass St Ives, Cambridgeshire and other local towns, then through the northern edge of Cambridge to Haverhill
A1308	A14 in Stowmarket	A1120 in Combs Ford	
A1309	M11 at Trumpington	A14 at Milton	Former A10 alignment
~~A1310~~			Unused
A1311	A1306 in South Hornchurch	A13 in South Hornchurch	Marsh Way, link road between A13 and A1306. Briefly part of A13 during completion of Thames Gateway 1998–1999.
~~A1312~~ - ~~A1320~~			Unused
A1321	A176 in Basildon	A132 in Basildon	Broadmayne, parallels the A1235 between the A176 and A132 roads
~~A1322~~ - ~~A1330~~			Unused
A1331			Planned road connecting the A120 and A133 east of Colchester.
~~A1332~~ - ~~A1340~~			Unused
A1341	A12 north of Myland	A134 in Myland	Created in 2015 along the Severalls Link Road.
~~A1342~~ - ~~A1357~~			Unused
A1358			Mapping error for the A1308.
~~A1359~~ - ~~A1399~~			Unused
A1400	A406 in South Woodford	A12 at Gants Hill	Formerly A406, but this section was only briefly considered part of the North Circular, the latter historically using the A104/A114/A116/A117 until 1987.
~~A1401~~			Unused
A1402	A147 in Norwich	A140 in Hellesdon	Former routing of the A140
~~A1403~~ - ~~A1420~~			Unused
A1421	A1123 in Haddenham	A142 near Witcham	Links with the A142 near Sutton, which leads to Ely
~~A1422~~ - ~~A1427~~			Unused
A1428			Planned for the former A428 when the Black Cat to Caxton scheme is completed.
~~A1429~~ - ~~A1433~~			Unused
A1434	A15 east of Lincoln	A46 in South Hykeham	
~~A1435~~ - ~~A1499~~			Unused
A1500	A15 near Scampton	A156 in Marton	Forms the eastern section of the Roman road from Ermine Street to Bawtry, fording the River Trent at Littleborough (the Roman settlement of Segelocum), then onto the Roman Fort at Doncaster (Danum).
~~A1501~~ - ~~A1519~~			Unused
