= A1031 road =

Road in Lincolnshire, England

A1031

Route information
- Length: 24 mi (39 km)

Major junctions
- North end: A46 at Cleethorpes
- A1098

- South end: A1104 at Mablethorpe

Location
- Country: United Kingdom

Road network
- Roads in the United Kingdom; Motorways; A and B road zones

The A1031 is a major secondary route in Lincolnshire that runs most of the North East coast of the county. It is 24.75 miles (39.8 km). It runs from Cleethorpes at Love Lane Corner Roundabout with the A46 road and ends at the A1104 road at Mablethorpe.

== History ==
In 1922, the A1031 followed the coast, going from Grimsby to Cleethorpes, and ended on the A1030 (now A46). It was later expanded south, along the B1198 up to the A1098. It was then extended all the way to Mablethorpe during the 1950s. After the construction of the A180 in 1983, the northern section of the A1031 was reclassified, but it was not upgraded, making it the only unimproved section of A180.

== Route ==
=== Cleethorpes to Humberston ===
The road starts at Love Lane Corner with the A46 road. It runs for approximately 1 mile to Hewits Circus where it crosses the A1098 road. It then passes Tesco into Humberston, where it turns right at the Country Park roundabout and towards Tetney. It goes through bends known as Humberston Bends.

=== Tetney ===
The road goes through the countryside for approximately 1 mile until it gets to Tetney. Through Tetney it bends three times.

=== North Cotes to Marshchapel ===
The road goes through the very small village of North Cotes, bending once, then out of the village, and then travels to the larger village of Marshchapel.

=== Grainthorpe to North Sommercotes ===
The road passes through Grainthorpe then on the edge of the village. It passes through the villages of Ludney and Conisholme, where it sharply bends. Following this the road goes on towards North Somercotes where it includes a junction with the road to Donna Nook to the north.

=== Saltfleet to Theddlethorpe ===
Moving south-east the road passes through the centre of Saltfleet. Just past Saltfllet is a T-Junction with the B1200 road, after which it passes through Theddlethorpe past wind turbines.

=== Mablethorpe ===
The road ends at the junction with the A1104 road just to the west of Mablethorpe.
