= A1000 road =

Road in England

A1000

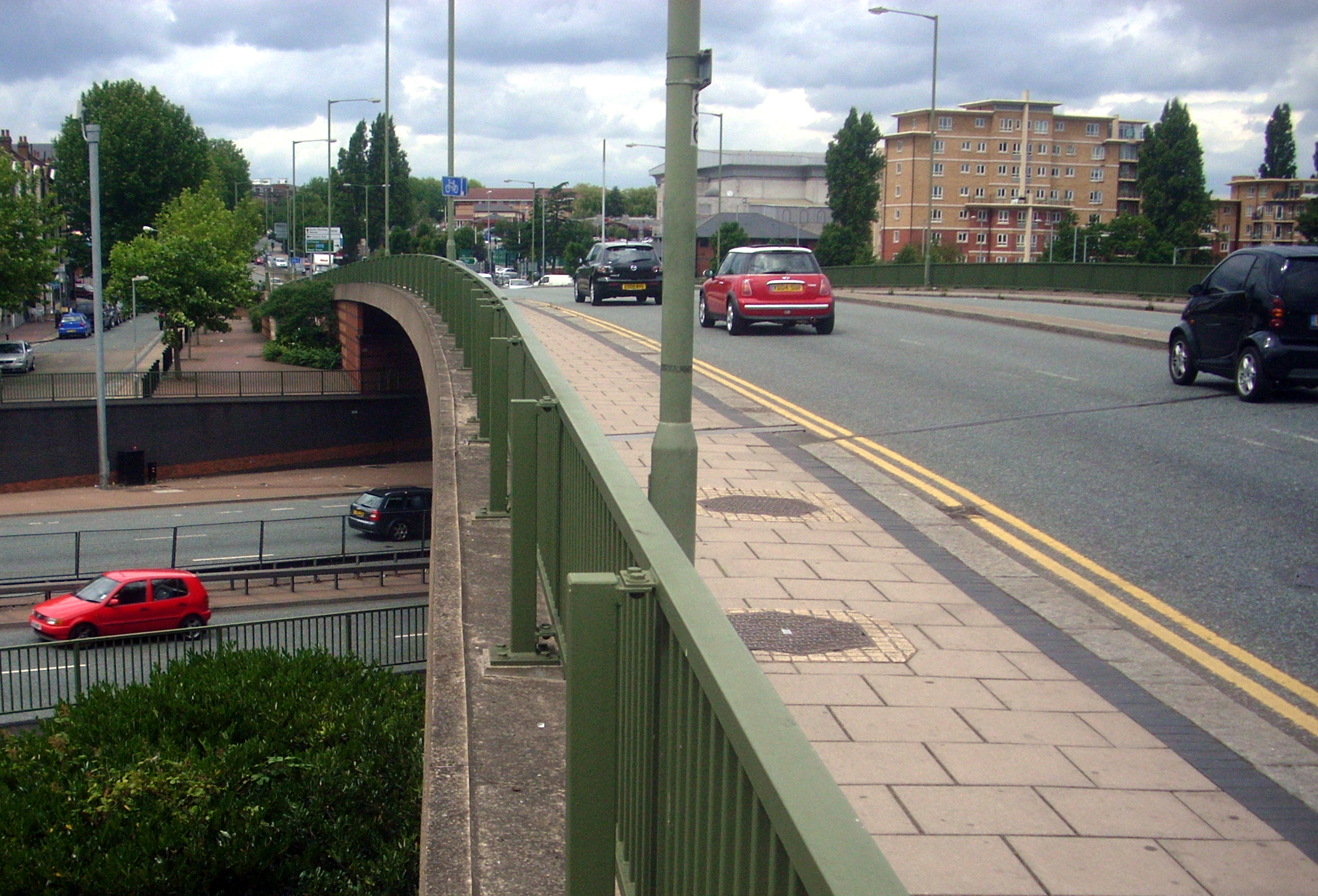
- The A1000 passing over the North Circular Road

Route information
- Length: 20 mi (32 km)

Major junctions
- South end: Highgate
- A1; A1(M); A109; A110; A111; A406; A411; A414; A504; A598; A1001; A1003; A1081; A5109; A6129
- North end: Welwyn

Location
- Country: United Kingdom
- Constituent country: England
- Primary destinations: Hatfield

Road network
- Roads in the United Kingdom; Motorways; A and B road zones

The A1000 is a main road in the United Kingdom, going from London to Welwyn.

== History ==
The A1000 was formerly known as the Great North Road (and parts of it still bear this name), or A1, but after a bypass was built in the 1920s it became the A1000. The 1922 Road Lists describes the A1000 as Finsbury Park station to Muswell Hill, which made it a quite short road. This road was later reclassified as part of the A1201.

== Route ==
The A1000 starts at East Finchley, North London, and travels for approximately 20 miles (32 km) to Welwyn, where it joins the A1(M) motorway. On its route it passes through Chipping Barnet, Potters Bar, and Hatfield, and goes through the Traditional Counties of Hertfordshire and Middlesex.

== Location ==
- Map sources for the start of the road near Highgate Wood
- Local History and Heritage of Barnet
