= A1082 road =

Road in Norfolk, England

Coordinates: 52.9333°N 1.2047°E

A1082

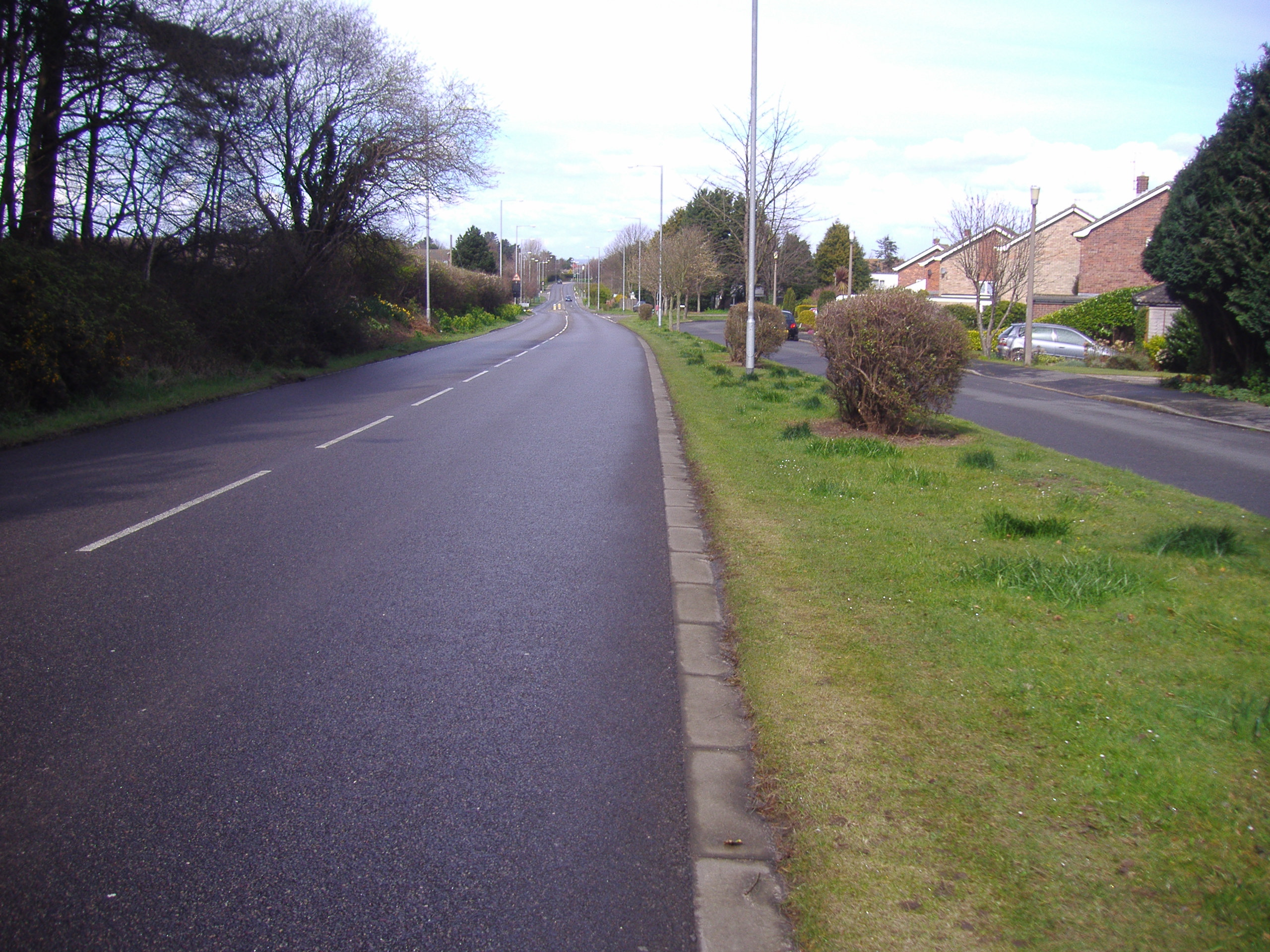
- A1082 road in Sheringham

Route information
- Length: 1.3 mi (2.1 km)

Major junctions
- North end: A148
- A148 A149
- South end: A149, Sheringham

Location
- Country: United Kingdom
- Constituent country: England

Road network
- Roads in the United Kingdom; Motorways; A and B road zones
← A1081	→ A1083

The A1082 is an English A road entirely in the county of Norfolk. It runs from a junction with the A148 King's Lynn to Cromer Road to a roundabout on the A149 in the North Norfolk coastal town of Sheringham.

== Route ==
The A1082 (Holway Road) is a link from the A148 King's Lynn to Cromer road to the town centre of Sheringham, which is 1.3 miles (2.1 km) north from this junction. It also joins the A149 King's Lynn to Great Yarmouth road to the A148, providing an alternative route for easterly drivers on the A149, around the town centre of Cromer, whose one way system snarls up in the summer. ¾ of the length of the A1082 is a 30 mph (48 km/h) speed Limit. There is one controlled pedestrian crossing.

== Landmarks ==
On the eastern side of the carriage way 0.4 miles (0.64 km) from the northern end of the road is Sheringham's new community centre.

=== Pretty Corner Woodland ===
From the southern terminus of the road running along the eastern side of the road towards the town of Sheringham is an area of woodland with full access to the general public. The area is managed by the Woodland Trust and covers an area of 31.43 hectares (77.7 acres) and is called Pretty Corner. There is a car park and access to the woodland of the A1082 0.8 miles (1.3 km) from Sheringham on the southern side of the carriage way. Within the wood there are several walks including one which takes you to one of the highest points in Norfolk at 96 metres (315 feet) above sea level. From here there are good views across the North Sea and the nearby Sheringham Shoal Offshore Wind Farm.

== History ==
=== Original Walthamstow route ===
The A1082 was a very short A road in Walthamstow. It started on the A104 Lea Bridge Road and headed along a short section of Whipps Cross Road to end on the A406 Woodford New Road.

The A1082 was originally part of the B160 but came into being in the mid-1920s following the construction of the A406 Woodford New Road. The A406 continued onto Whipps Cross Road and the A1082 number was given to that part of the road that remained.

The road now forms the western side of the Whipps Cross Roundabout and the A406 has moved elsewhere.
