= M10 motorway (Great Britain) =

Former motorway in Hertfordshire, England

Coordinates: 51.7374°N 0.3710°W

M10
- M10 highlighted in blue

Route information
- Established by Ministry of Transport with Hertfordshire County Council and Tarmac Construction
- Length: 2.8 mi (4.5 km)
- Time period: 2 November 1959 – 1 May 2009
- Cultural significance: Joint-second motorway in Great Britain
- Related routes: M1 and M45

Major junctions
- Northwest end: Hemel Hempstead
- M1 motorway
- Southeast end: St Albans

Location
- Country: United Kingdom

Road network
- Roads in the United Kingdom; Motorways; A and B road zones

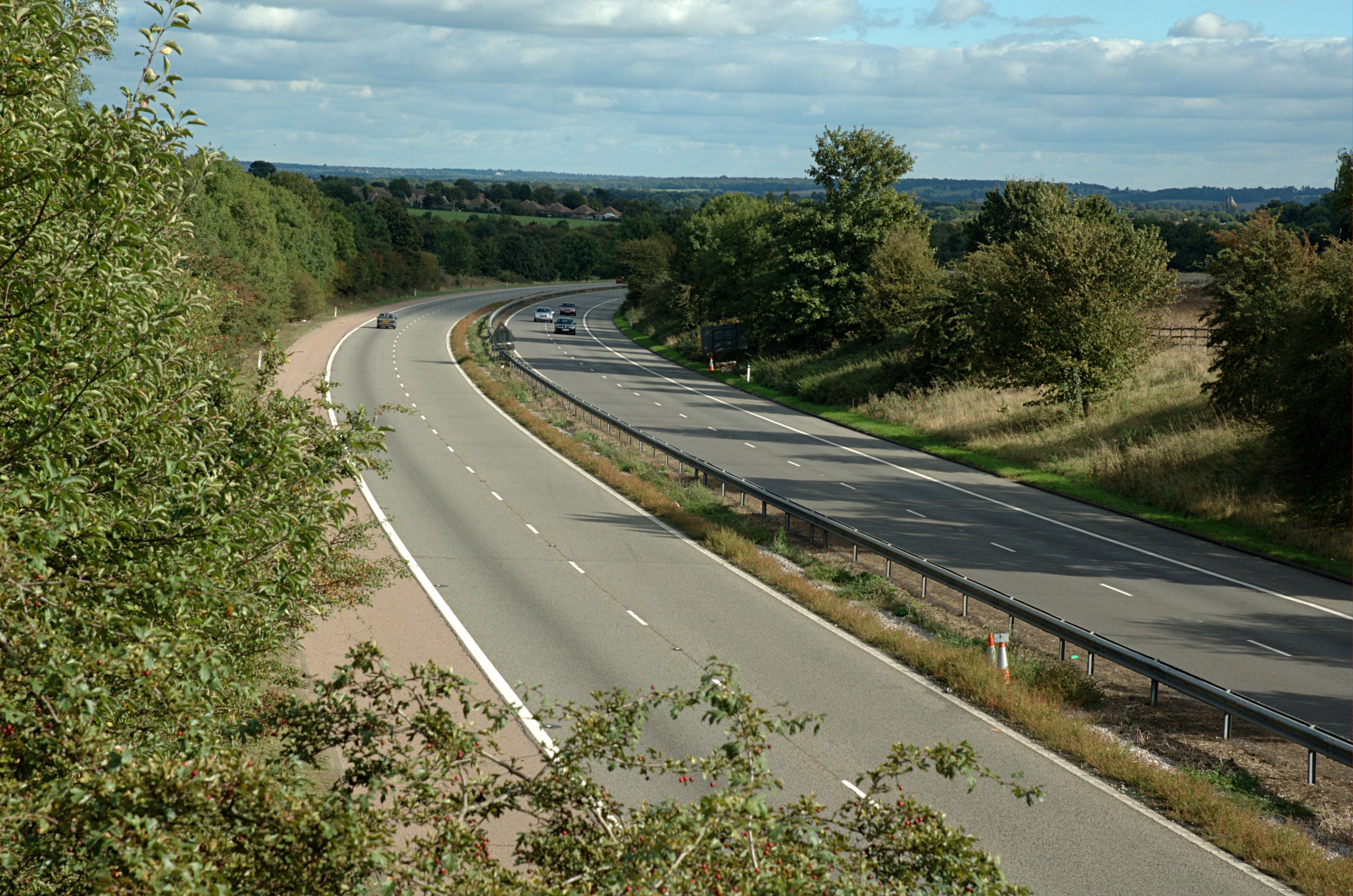
M10 south of St Albans in 2005

The M10 was a motorway in Hertfordshire, England, running for approximately 3 miles (4.5 km) southeast from the M1 motorway at junction 7 near Hemel Hempstead to the A414 North Orbital Road at Park Street Roundabout, just south of St Albans. Opened in 1959, it was reclassified as part of the A414 in 2009 having only been a spur motorway for about 50 years.

== History ==
=== Construction ===
During construction on Tuesday July 7 1959 at 11am, a plane carrying surveyors crashed on the motorway at Leverstock Green. It killed the pilot, Eric Ashton, and the 39 year old county surveyor of Holland, who had parachuted as a Captain in the war, with the 1st Parachute Squadron of the Royal Engineers. Other passengers included Robin Martin, aged 38, the assistant managing director of Tarmac Civil Engineering. The aircraft was a De Havilland Rapide 'G-AHPT', hired by Tarmac from Don Everall Aviation of Wolverhampton.

=== Opening ===
The M10 opened on 2 November 1959 along with the M1 and M45, and was designed and constructed by Tarmac Construction as part of the St Albans bypass (along with the M1 between junctions 5 and 10).

At the time, the M1's southern terminus was at junction 5 at Berrygrove, with the main route from there to the A1 in London being via the A41 Watford Bypass. Since the capacity of the A roads was much less than that of the motorway, a distributing spur was required to split up the traffic and reduce congestion at Berrygrove. The M10 was thus built to distribute southbound traffic on the M1 onto the A5 (now A5183) and, as an alternative, via the North Orbital Road and the A6 to the A1 Barnet Bypass.

The M45 was the equivalent distributing spur at the northern end of the M1, and is thus regarded as a sister motorway to the M10.

In later years, as the M1 was extended southwards into London and the M25 was built, the M10's original purpose eroded. It was sometimes suggested that the motorway might have been extended to meet the M25 at junction 22, but this was never proposed.

== Downgrade ==
In December 2008, widening of the M1 between the M25 and Luton was completed, with non-motorway collector/distributor lanes built to link junction 8 of the M1, at Hemel Hempstead, with junction 7 and the M10. As traffic could now travel between Hemel Hempstead and Park Street Roundabout without having to access the M1, there was no need to keep the M10 as a motorway. Hence, on 1 May 2009, the M10 was downgraded to become part of the A414 road.

== Junctions ==
M10 motorway
North-Westbound exits	Junction	South-Eastbound exits
M1 – The North (northbound only) [[A414 road| A414 – Hemel Hempstead]]	J2 Terminus (M1 J7)	Start of motorway
Start of motorway	J1 Terminus	[[A414 road| A414 – Hatfield, Hertford]] [[A414 road| A5183 – St Albans, Radlett]] [[A414 road| A405 – Bricket Wood]]

== See also ==
- List of motorways in the United Kingdom
