= Conisholme =

Settlement and civil parish in Lincolnshire, England

Coordinates: 53.43°N 0.10°E

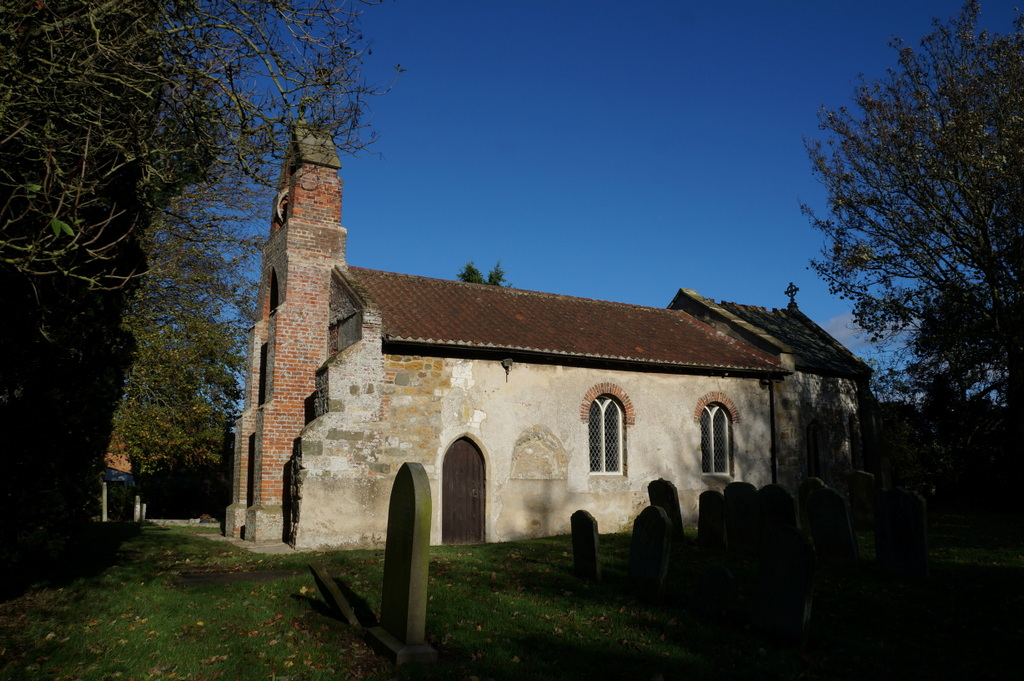
- St Peter's, Conisholme

- Location within Lincolnshire
- Population: 87
- OS grid reference: TF402955
  - London: 135 mi (217 km) SSW
- District: East Lindsey
- Shire county: Lincolnshire
- Region: East Midlands
- Country: England
- Sovereign state: United Kingdom
- Post town: LOUTH
- Postcode district: LN11
- Dialling code: 01507
- Police: Lincolnshire
- Fire: Lincolnshire
- Ambulance: East Midlands
- UK Parliament: Louth and Horncastle

Conisholme is a small settlement and civil parish in the East Lindsey district of Lincolnshire, England. It is on the Cleethorpes to Mablethorpe A1031 road, and 7 miles (11 km) north-east from Louth. The population is included in the civil parish of Grainthorpe.

== Community ==
Conisholme is approximately 3 miles (5 km) from the Lincolnshire coast. The parish covers an area of 1,240 acres (5.0 km^{2}), but only a small amount is taken up by the A1031 road – from Ludney to the west to halfway between the village and Braygate Bridge, to the north-east. The major village of North Somercotes is to the east. The parish mostly extends south-west across Conisholme Fen towards the Louth Canal and North Cockerington.

The county council Louth Marsh and district council North Somercotes wards are both Conservative, and represented by Robert Palmer who is also the Chairman of East Lindsey District Council.

The parish church is dedicated to St Peter. It is in the North Somercotes group of churches, with Grainthorpe.

=== Wind turbines ===
The wind turbines at Fen Farm on Conisholme Fen, south-west of the village, have the capacity to supply 24% of electricity needs in East Lindsey, Each turbine has a hub height of between 165 and 252 feet (50 and 77 m), a rotor diameter of 157 feet (48 m), an overall height of 292 feet (89 m), and produces 800kWe. The farm, operated by Ecotricity, produces enough energy for 13,000 homes.

The turbines were designed by architect Norman Foster and built by Enercon. Construction began in December 2007, and was finished on 17 April 2008.

During the early hours of 4 January 2009, one of the twenty wind turbines was damaged. The story received coverage on the BBC News. Ecotricity, after its preliminary examination and before forensic results, stated that UFOs were "at the bottom of its probability list for the cause", and they were considering that the turbine may have suffered from a lightning strike, collision, metal fatigue, or design, material or maintenance failure.
