= Grovehill Junction =

English junction

- Interactive map of Grovehill Junction

Location
- Beverley, East Riding of Yorkshire
- Coordinates: 53.8446°N 0.4078°W
- Roads at junction: A1174

Construction
- Type: Roundabout
- Maintained by: East Riding of Yorkshire Council

Grovehill Junction is a junction in Beverley, East Riding of Yorkshire. At one time, the junction was a roundabout. It is now a single level junction with 42 traffic lights and is considered to be the UK's craziest junction. The junction is located at TA 048 397.

== History ==
The earliest recorded history of the junction is that it was a five-way roundabout. In February 2015, the roundabout was replaced with a junction having nine crossing points and 20 movements, controlled by 42 traffic lights. Early in October 2015, the lights failed and the traffic was observed to move more freely than with the traffic lights working. An audit of the junction has stated the junction has more lights than needed.

== Reception ==
The junction has been dubbed "The Red Light District". A German TV station sent a crew to drive around the junction for the amusement of its viewers. Despite the concerns, East Riding of Yorkshire Council states that the junction "works well".
