= A414 road =

Major road in England

A414

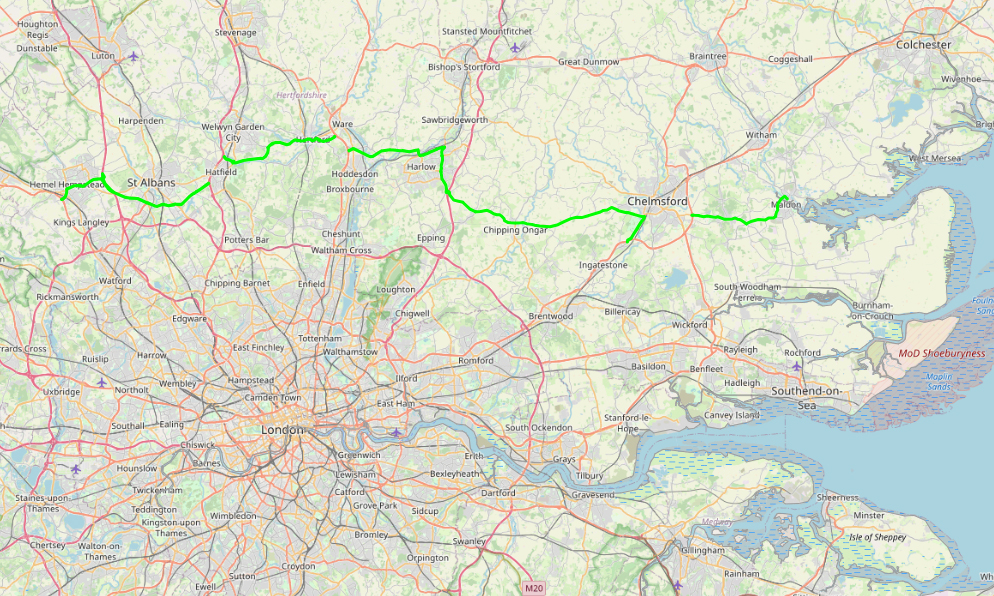

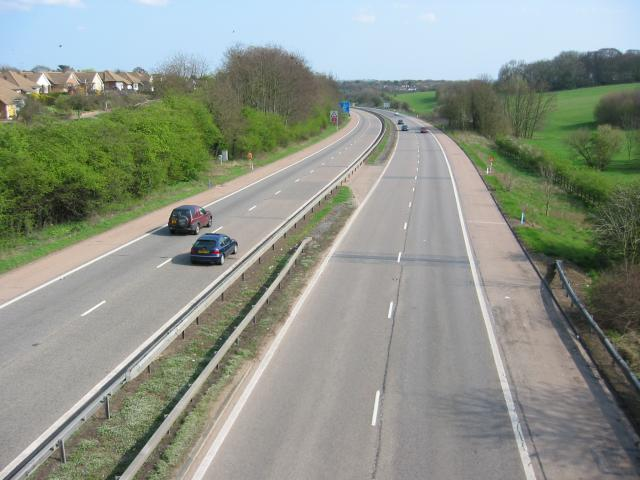
- A414 near St Albans, prior to being downgraded from M10 motorway status

Route information
- Length: 66.7 mi (107.3 km)

Major junctions
- West end: Hemel Hempstead
- A41; A4251; A4146; A4147; M1; A405; A5183; A1081; A1(M); A1001; A6129; A1000; A119; A10; A1170; A1019; A1169; A1184; A1025; M11; A128; A1114; A12; A1060
- East end: Maldon

Location
- Country: United Kingdom
- Primary destinations: St Albans; Watford; Hatfield; Hertford; Harlow; Stansted Airport; Chelmsford

Road network
- Roads in the United Kingdom; Motorways; A and B road zones

The A414 is a major road in England, which connects the towns of Hemel Hempstead in Hertfordshire and Maldon in Essex. The road commences at the A41, at a junction west of Hemel, and travels through the town to junction 8 of the M1 motorway at Buncefield. From there, it runs parallel to the M1 until junction 7, heading south of St Albans and east through Hatfield and Hertford. The road then crosses the A10 and into Essex; it travels through Harlow, Chipping Ongar and Chelmsford, before terminating at Maldon.

== History ==
The section between the M1 and the Park Street roundabout junction south of St Albans was formerly classified as the M10 motorway. This was downgraded to A road status on 1 May 2009, following the completion of the M1 widening between junctions 7 and 8 of the M1.

Between the (former) M10 Junction 1 at Park Street, and the A1 junction, the A414 is named the North Orbital Road which reflects the planners' intent to build an outer orbital road around London. The North Orbital Road route was never completed, the planners opting to build the M25 orbital motorway instead.

The A414 route has always connected Hemel Hempstead and Maldon, but over the years it has changed so much that it is almost completely new. The original route from Hemel Hempstead to St Albans followed the course of what is now the A4147, then from St Albans to Hatfield on the course of what are now the A1057 and B6426. The villages of Cole Green, Birch Green, and Staines Green were bypassed in the 1990s by a new dual carriageway that linked into the 1970s Hertingfordbury bypass. On the other side of Hertford, the A414 took what is now the A119 Ware Road, and then diverged along the course of the current B1502 and B181 from Hertford to Stanstead Abbotts. Between November 2009 and April 2011 the section between junction 7 of the M11 and Southern Way in Harlow was widened from three to four lanes and the Southern way roundabout completely remodelled.

Epping and Ongar Road Act 1787
- Act of Parliament
- Parliament of Great Britain
- Long title: An Act for continuing and enlarging the Term and Powers of several Acts made in the Tenth Year of the Reign of King George the First, the Sixteenth Year of the Reign of King George the Second, and the Ninth Year of the Reign of His present Majesty, for repairing the Road from the North Part of Harlow Bush Common in the Parish of Harlow, to Woodford in the County of Essex; and for repairing and widening the Road from Epping through the Parishes of Northweald Bassett, Bobbingworth, High Ongar, Chipping Ongar, and Shelley, to the Four Want Way in the said Parish of Shelley, and from thence through the Parishes of High Ongar and Norton Mandeville to the Parish of Writtle in the said County.
- Citation: 27 Geo. 3. c. 69
- Territorial extent: Great Britain

Dates
- Royal assent: 22 March 1787
- Commencement: 23 January 1787 (Note: Start of session.)
- Repealed: 15 May 1822
Other legislation
Amends	Essex Roads Act 1723; Epping and Ongar Road Act 1742; Epping and Ongar Road Act 1769
Repealed by	Road from Harlow Act 1822

Status: Repealed

Text of statute as originally enacted

Most of the Essex section (between the Talbot at Tylers Green and Writtle) was originally the A122. The road between Harlow and Writtle was maintained in the 18th and 19th centuries by the Epping and Ongar Turnpike Trust, who charged tolls. The original A414 road bypassed Harlow to the north, travelling through High Wych on what is now an unclassified road, and travelling through Sawbridgeworth to meet what is now the A1060 at Hatfield Heath, which it followed through to Chelmsford. In Chelmsford itself, the road numbers have been subject to change several times over the last three or four decades, with the A12, A130 and A414 having been rerouted many times over that period.

== Future proposals ==
In 2019, Hertfordshire County Council published a report, the A414 Corridor Strategy, analysing usage traffic congestion on this key route for east-west travel across Hertfordshire. The report identified risks with predicted traffic flows, recommended highway improvements and proposed the creation of a rapid transit system along the route using light rail or guided bus. The transit proposals are now being evaluated under the Hertfordshire Essex Rapid Transit (HERT) project.
