= A1025 road =

Road in Harlow

A1025

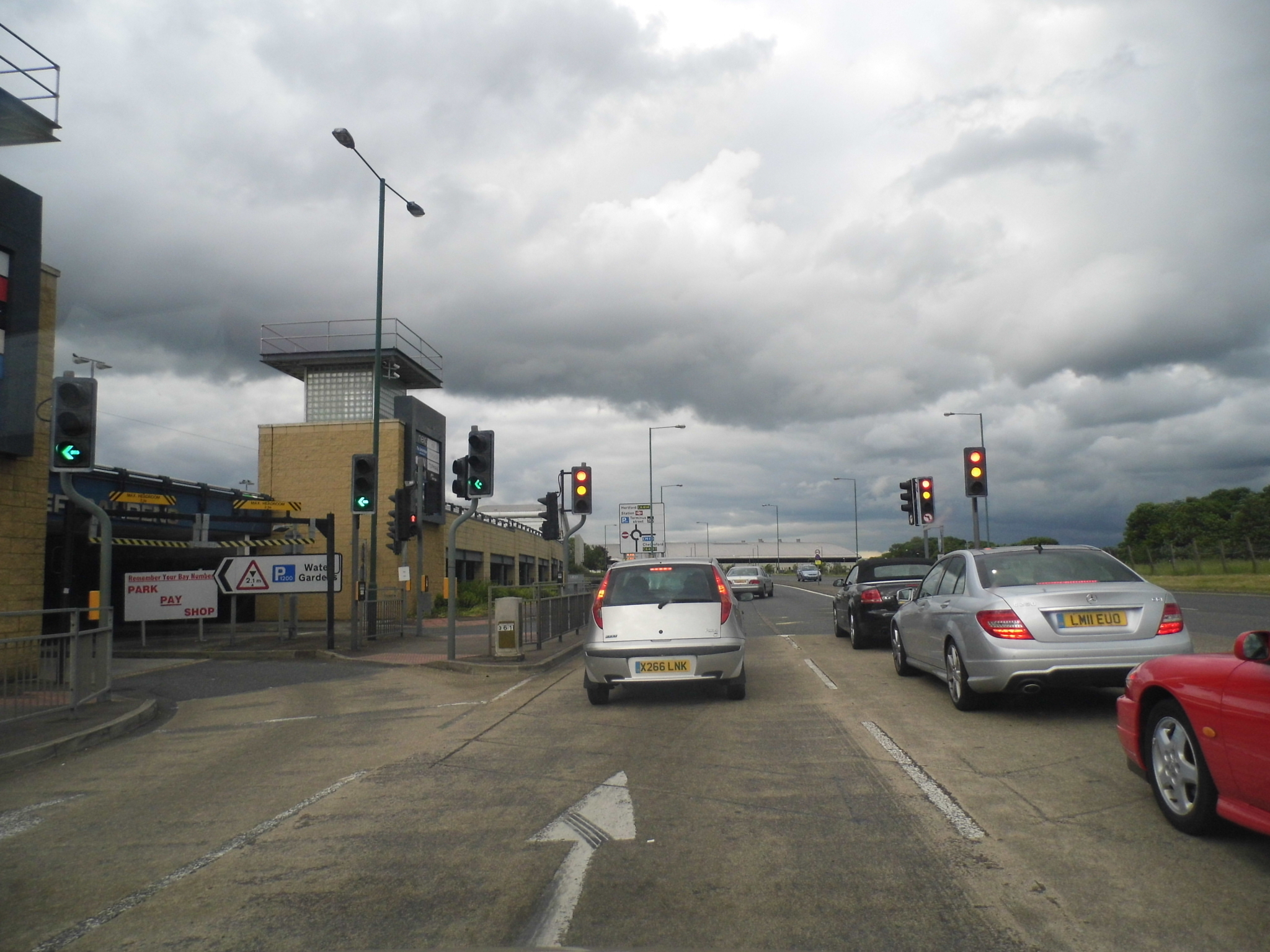
- Third Avenue (A1025) in Harlow

Route information
- Length: 2.3 mi (3.7 km)

Major junctions
- West end: A1169
- A1169; A1019; A414; M11
- East end: M11 Junction 7a

Location
- Country: United Kingdom
- Primary destinations: Harlow

Road network
- Roads in the United Kingdom; Motorways; A and B road zones
← A1024	→ A1027

The A1025 is a significant road located in Harlow, England, serving as a vital transportation link within the region. It connects the A1169 with M11 Junction 7A, facilitating access to the motorway network for local and through traffic. Notably, an of extension to the M11 was opened to traffic on 10 June 2022, enhancing connectivity to the motorway. The road previously terminated on the A414, Before its current designation. and before that it was allocated to a different route in Norwich, which is now the A147 and A1242. In the road traffic statistics for 2020, the road accommodates 8,400 vehicles per day, while this significantly increases in between A1169 and A1019, with 28,700 vehicles per day with the A1019 and A414, indicating higher traffic volume towards the latter section.

== Route ==
Starting on the A1169 St Katherine's Way / Third Avenue, the A1025 heads east, continuing along Third Avenue and immediately turns to the left. It follows Third Avenue for about 0.75 miles (1.21 km), until the road reaches a roundabout with a shopping outlet. A few hundred yards further down the road, the A1025 reaches a junction with the A1019. Here the A1025 turns right, and turns into Second Avenue. The road reaches a couple more roundabouts for housing estates, before it temporarily ends on the A414. The A1025 follows the A414 to the north for about 1.1 miles (1.8 km). Here there A1025 regains its number, with the road turning right onto First Avenue. Then about 400 yards (370 m) later, the road meets another roundabout with London Road, where it becomes Gilden Way. The road passes fields to the south, and a housing estate to the north. We then arrive at the Churchgate Roundabout, which has recently been turned into a hamburger roundabout due to the M11 Junction 7a. Here the road meets a grand new housing development, named Gilden Park, to the north, and Churchgate Street, to the south. Gilden Way passes Mayfield Farm, until it reaches The Campions Roundabout, where it meets the B183. Here it continues straight onto the M11 Link Road, until it finishes at M11 Junction 7a - Harlow North Junction.

=== Extension to M11 Junction 7a ===
As part of the new M11 Junction 7a development, the A1025 will take over part of the B183, from the A414 to The Campions Roundabout, and will provide a link road to the new junction. The £76m cost has been met by the council and National Highways. The new junction 7a has been developed as one of the largest road infrastructure projects in Essex for many years.

The road opened on 10 June 2022, by Councillor Lesley Wagland, and Conservative MP for Harlow, Robert Halfon.

== History ==
=== Original Norwich route ===
In the original 1922 road numbering, the A1025 was listed as Norwich (King Street (part) - Boom Towers - Carrow Road (part)). It bypassed the southeast corner of the city centre, from the A146 (now A147) to the A47 (now A1242). It is now classified as parts of the A147 and A1242 inner ring road in the city.
