= Brampton Hut interchange =

Road junction in Cambridgeshire, England

Brampton Hut Interchange
- Interactive map of Brampton Hut Interchange

Location
- Brampton, Cambridgeshire
- Coordinates: 52°19′58″N 0°14′55″W
- Roads at junction: A1; A14; A141

Construction
- Type: Roundabout interchange
- Maintained by: National Highways

Location of Brampton Hut Interchange in Cambridgeshire (1996 boundaries and road layout)

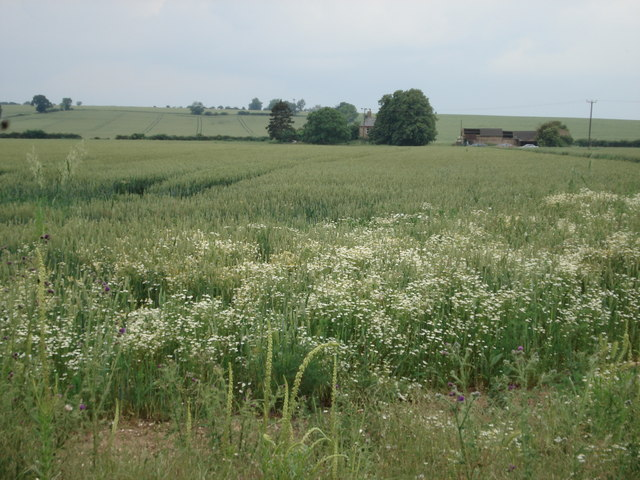
Arable farm land at Brampton Hut

The Brampton Hut interchange west of Huntingdon links the A1 and A14 trunk roads, and the A141 road which takes traffic into Huntingdon or towards Norfolk.

The A1 passes over a grade separated roundabout which provides access to a spur of the A14 west, which gives access, to the main A14 allowing travel to and from the west only. (This spur is occasionally mapped as an extension of A141.) Traffic on the A1(M) and A14 to and from the south and east uses continuous flow slip roads 2–4 miles south of Brampton Hut to link the A1(M) to the A14. Previously, traffic from the A14 East and wishing to travel north would have used the former A14, northern spur (now A141/A1307) to access the A1(M) at Alconbury, which is now intended for local traffic only.

== Service station ==
The service station at Brampton Hut includes a BP Connect filling station and truck park, a Brewers Fayre restaurant, Premier Inn hotel, McDonald's, Starbucks, Subway, Burger King and Wendy's.

== History ==
The junction is named after the Brampton Hut Hotel, which was demolished in 1990. Brampton Hut had earlier been known as Creamer's Hut, which was well known in coaching days certainly before 1816. It was so called as it looked like a wooden hut on stilts. There was an inclosure award on the parish by the Brampton Inclosure Act 1772 (12 Geo. 3. c. 67 Pr.).

The service station was opened in 1998, with hotels and restaurants gradually added over the next two decades. Traffic lights were added in 2006 to attempt to reduce the traffic jams on the A14 entering the junction from either side.

== Reconstruction in 2016-9 ==
The A14 Ellington to Fen Drayton section was largely completed by 2020, the A14 was rerouted to pass south of Huntingdon and southwest of the current Brampton Hut junction, with links to the A1(M) and A141 from the junction. The former route that used to run right through the outskirts of Godmanchester and Huntingdon has been downgraded to a local road. People living in Huntingdon had to endure numerous issues including the noise caused by the construction works and the effects that sleepless nights have on their private lives.
