= A1107 road =

Road in Scotland

Coordinates: 55.8915°N 2.2165°W

A1107

Location
- Country: United Kingdom
- Constituent country: England

Road network
- Roads in the United Kingdom; Motorways; A and B road zones

The A1107 is a road in south-east Scotland, in the Scottish Borders. It is a non-trunk route from near Cockburnspath to near Burnmouth.

== Route ==
It follows the route Burnmouth – Eyemouth – Coldingham – Old Cambus – Pease Bay – Cockburnspath.

The route offers an excellent view of the relatively flat area to the east of Dunbar (East Lothian), namely the Torness Power Station and the Isle of May at the end of the Firth of Forth and across to Fife.

== Settlements ==
Only at the southern end are there any settlements (Eyemouth and Coldingham). The route is closer to the east coast than the main A1 road inland, therefore providing a touristic alternative route along the sea shore.

== History ==
The road contains what was once the highest bridge in Europe, a masonry structure over the gorge that leads out to the nearby Pease Bay, now a holiday caravan site. At its southern end, this bridge crosses the Southern Upland Way and Sir Walter Scott Way long-distance footpaths.

== Proposed additions ==
There was a proposal to construct a wind farm straddling the road consisting of 22 wind turbines with a maximum height of 76 m. The planning officials of the Scottish Borders Council recommended refusal of the application of the developers PM Renewable Ltd. The planning application was rejected by a unanimous decision of the Scottish Borders Council.
