= A1081 road =

Road in the south of England

A1081

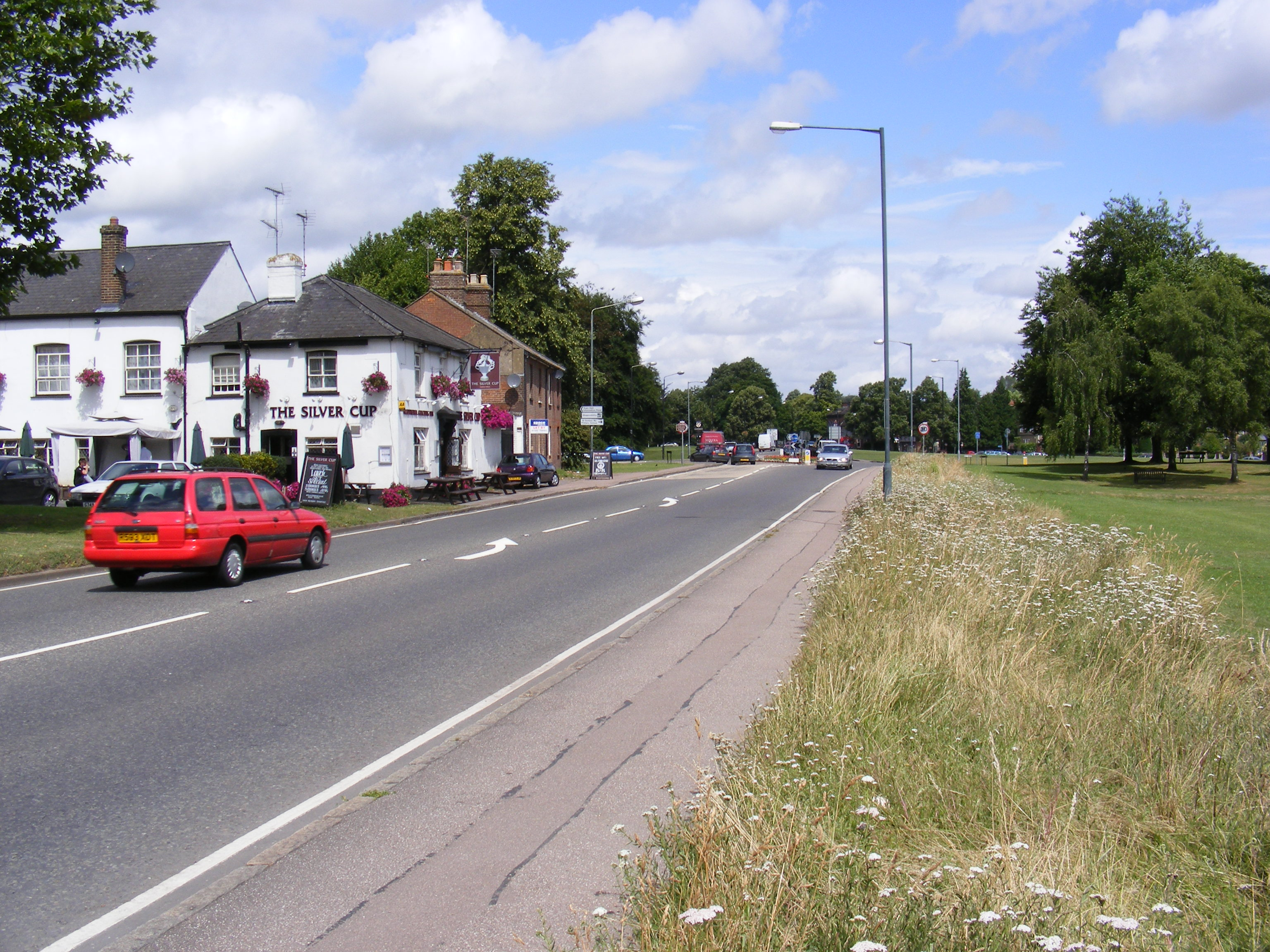
- A1081 St Albans Road looking towards Harpenden

Route information
- Length: 20.5 mi (33.0 km)

Major junctions
- North end: Luton Airport; 51.8697°N 0.3970°W
- A505; M1 A4147 A5183 A414 M25; A1 A1000
- South end: A1000 road, High Barnet; 51.6563°N 0.2019°W

Location
- Country: United Kingdom

Road network
- Roads in the United Kingdom; Motorways; A and B road zones
| ← A1080 | → A1082 |

The A1081 is a road in the south of England. It starts at Luton Airport in Bedfordshire and runs to High Barnet in Greater London via Harpenden, St Albans and London Colney, a distance of around 20.5 miles (33.0 km). For most of its length, the A1081 follows the route of the original A6.

== The route ==
The first section of the A1081 runs south-west from Luton Airport to the spur of the M1 motorway on the southern outskirts of Luton. This section is a dual carriageway known as New Airport Way. Just west of the airport, there is a junction with the A505.

At the M1 spur, the A1081 turns south to join the route of the original A6. It skirts the grounds of Luton Hoo estate, then crosses into Hertfordshire, passing through Harpenden before reaching St Albans.

In St Albans, the road has a junction with the A4147 and A1057 (both making up the former A414), then meets the A5183 (the former A5). At this point, it bears south-east, bypassing London Colney before reaching junction 22 of the M25 motorway. There is a junction with the current A414, the North Orbital Road, just north of London Colney.

The A1081 then multiplexes with the M25 to junction 23 at South Mimms, the junction with the current A1 and A1(M). From here, it continues south-east to High Barnet, ending at a junction with the Great North Road (the former A1, now the A1000).

== History ==
The A1081 designation was originally used on The Woodford Spur in east London. The Woodford Spur is a 1920s new build road that branches off the A12 (former A106) Eastern Avenue at the Gants Hill Roundabout and heads through Woodford.

It was allocated the A1081 number in 1925, although the road hadn't yet opened. It was opened not long afterwards between the A106 and A11 (now A1199), with the section to the A104 opened later (shown as under construction on the 1932 OS Maps).

The A1081 number became redundant after World War II when the road became an extension of the A406. The North Circular has since been rerouted and so the section east of the A113 is now numbered A1400.

The current A1081 was established in the 1950s, when the section of the A6 from South Mimms to High Barnet was so renumbered following the re-routing of the A1 onto the 1920s-built Barnet Bypass.

When the M25 was built in the 1980s, it took over the section of the A6 from London Colney to South Mimms, which was already dual carriageway. The section from Luton to London Colney was then renumbered the A1081.
