= Grainthorpe =

Village in Lincolnshire, England

Coordinates: 53.450645°N 0.080999°E

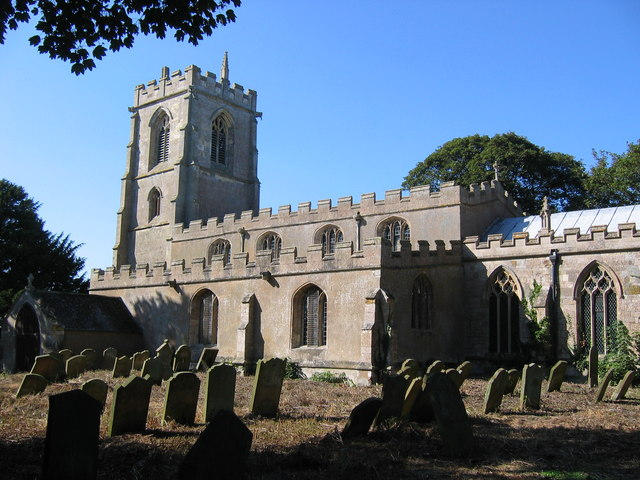
- St Clement's Church, Grainthorpe

- Location within Lincolnshire
- Population: 749 (2011)
- OS grid reference: TF382968
  - London: 130 mi (210 km) S
- District: East Lindsey
- Shire county: Lincolnshire
- Region: East Midlands
- Country: England
- Sovereign state: United Kingdom
- Post town: LOUTH
- Postcode district: LN11
- Police: Lincolnshire
- Fire: Lincolnshire
- Ambulance: East Midlands
- UK Parliament: Louth and Horncastle

Grainthorpe is a small village and civil parish in the East Lindsey district of Lincolnshire, England. It is situated 7 miles (11 km) north-east from the town of Louth, and approximately 3 miles (5 km) from the Lincolnshire coast. The civil parish includes the hamlets of Wragholme to the north-west, and Ludney to the south-east. The population of Conisholme is included in the 2011 census.

Grainthorpe is listed in the 1086 Domesday Book as "Germundtorp", with 28 households. The deserted medieval village of Swinehope was believed to be cited here, abandoned when its harbour silted up. There was a medieval saltern at the hamlet of Wragholme.

The parish church is a Grade I listed building dedicated to St Clement and dating from 1200, with later alterations, additions, and restorations. It has a 15th-century font. The churchyard contains war graves of a soldier and a Royal Flying Corps airman of the First World War.

Grainthorpe Hall is an early 18th-century red-brick house, which is Grade II listed.

Grainthorpe has its own primary school, village hall and post office, although the post office is currently open only two days a week in the Church Hall. The Coach house adjacent to the old Mill has been restored, and has re-opened as a village shop and tea room. There is also now a village shop Gilimans, selling supplies and pet food. Prior to this, the village's nearest shops were in the nearby villages of Marshchapel, North Somercotes, and Alvingham. Also sited in the village are playing fields which consist of a tennis court, football pitch and cricket pitch.
