= Bishop Barrington Academy =

Coordinates: 54.6518°N 1.6902°W

Location
- Woodhouse Lane; Bishop Auckland, County Durham, DL14 6LA; England

Information
- Type: Academy
- Established: 1810
- Founder: Shute Barrington
- Local authority: Durham
- Trust: Advance Learning Partnership
- Department for Education URN: 148706 Tables
- Ofsted: Reports
- Headteacher: Grant Sowerby
- Gender: Coeducational
- Age: 11 to 16
- Enrolment: 682
- Website: http://www.bishopbarrington.org.uk

Bishop Barrington Academy (formerly Bishop Barrington School) is a co-educational secondary school located in the town of Bishop Auckland, Co Durham, England.

It was established in 1810 in the town's market place and named after, the then Bishop of Durham, Shute Barrington, who was a notable patron of education. Today the school is based on Woodhouse Lane opposite St John's Catholic School and Bishop Auckland College.

Previously a community school administered by Durham County Council, in September 2021 Bishop Barrington School converted to academy status and was renamed Bishop Barrington Academy. The school is now sponsored by the Advance Learning Partnership.
