= Bishop Auckland =

Town and civil parish in County Durham, England

- Market town and civil parish
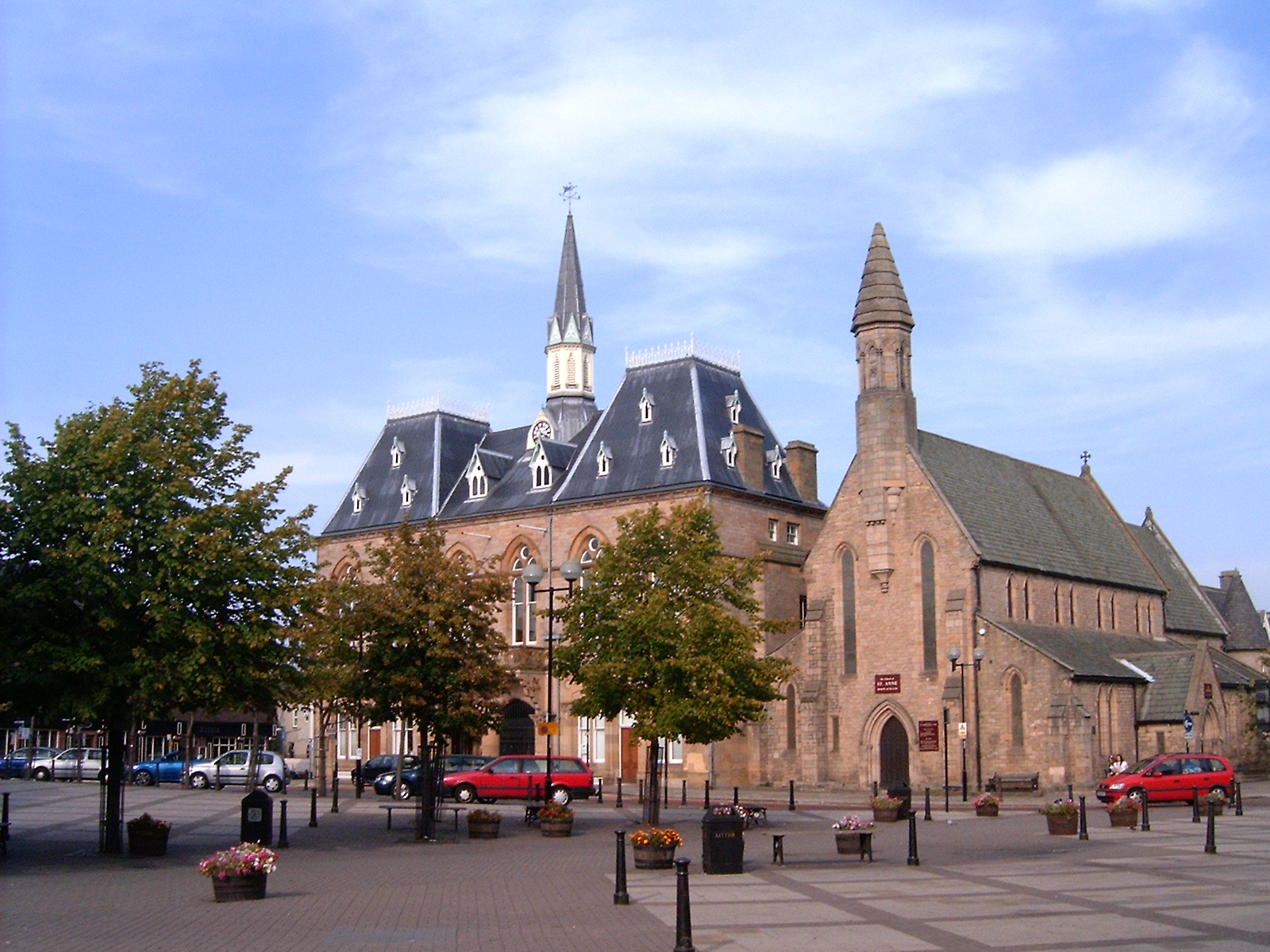
- Bishop Auckland Town Hall

- Location within County Durham
- Population: 23,354 (2021 Census)
- OS grid reference: NZ208294
  - London: 227 mi (365 km) SbE
- Civil parish: Bishop Auckland
- Unitary authority: County Durham
- Ceremonial county: County Durham
- Region: North East
- Country: England
- Sovereign state: United Kingdom
- Post town: BISHOP AUCKLAND
- Postcode district: DL14
- Dialling code: 01388
- Police: Durham
- Fire: County Durham and Darlington
- Ambulance: North East
- UK Parliament: Bishop Auckland

Bishop Auckland (/ˈɔːk.lənd/ AWK-lənd) is a market town and civil parish at the confluence of the River Wear and the River Gaunless in County Durham, England. It is 12 miles (19 km) northwest of Darlington and 12 miles (19 km) southwest of Durham. It had a population of 23,354 at the 2021 census.

Much of the town's early history surrounds the Bishops of Durham and the establishment of Auckland Castle's predecessor, a hunting lodge, which became the main residence of Durham Bishops. This is reflected in the first part of the town's name. During the Industrial Revolution, the town grew rapidly as coal mining became its largest industry. Decline in the coal mining industry during the late twentieth century has changed the town's largest sector to manufacturing.

Since 1 April 2009, the town's local authority has been Durham County Council. The unitary authority replaced the previous Wear Valley District and Durham County councils. The parliamentary constituency of Bishop Auckland is named after the town. It is currently held by Sam Rushworth of the Labour Party. The town is twinned with the French town of Ivry-sur-Seine.

== History ==
=== Names ===
The town was first attested under the name Alclit with Alcluith and Alcleat also found. Auckland is an area name used in the settlements of St Helen Auckland, West Auckland and St Andrew Auckland, the latter an old name for South Church, all of which are along the path of the Gaunless. The town was in the Bishop of Durham's land, gaining the 'bishop' element to differentiate it from the other settlements.

The name Gaunless is of Norse origin, thought to mean useless. It is believed that this derives from the river's inability to power a mill, sustain fish or create fertile floodplains.

==== Auckland ====
It is thought to be Cumbric, related to Alclud (which was the Kingdom of Strathclyde's alternative name) meaning "cliff on the Clyde". It is thought 'Clyde' may be the river Gaunless's ancient name.

Historically attempts have been made to link Auckland to Old Norse Aukland meaning 'additional land'. This view of the name origin could refer to the area recorded as being extra land granted to the Bishop of Durham by King Canute in around 1020.

Another suggestion is that Auckland derives from Old English or Old Norse combination of 'oak' and 'land', a woodland in the area with a majority of oak trees with each settlement built between it and the river Gaunless.

=== Early ===
The earliest known reference to Bishop Auckland itself is around 1000 AD as land given to the Earl of Northumberland for defending the church against the Scots. It is also mentioned in 1020 as a gift given to the Bishop of Durham by King Canute. However, a village almost certainly existed on the town's present site long before this, with there being evidence of church on the site of St Andrew's Church in South Church as early as the seventh century. Furthermore, the Romans had a look-out post where Auckland Castle is sited today and a 10-acre (0.040 km^{2}) fort at nearby Binchester. There is also evidence of possible Iron Age settlements around the town, together with finds of Bronze Age, Neolithic and Mesolithic artefacts.

=== Bishops of Durham ===
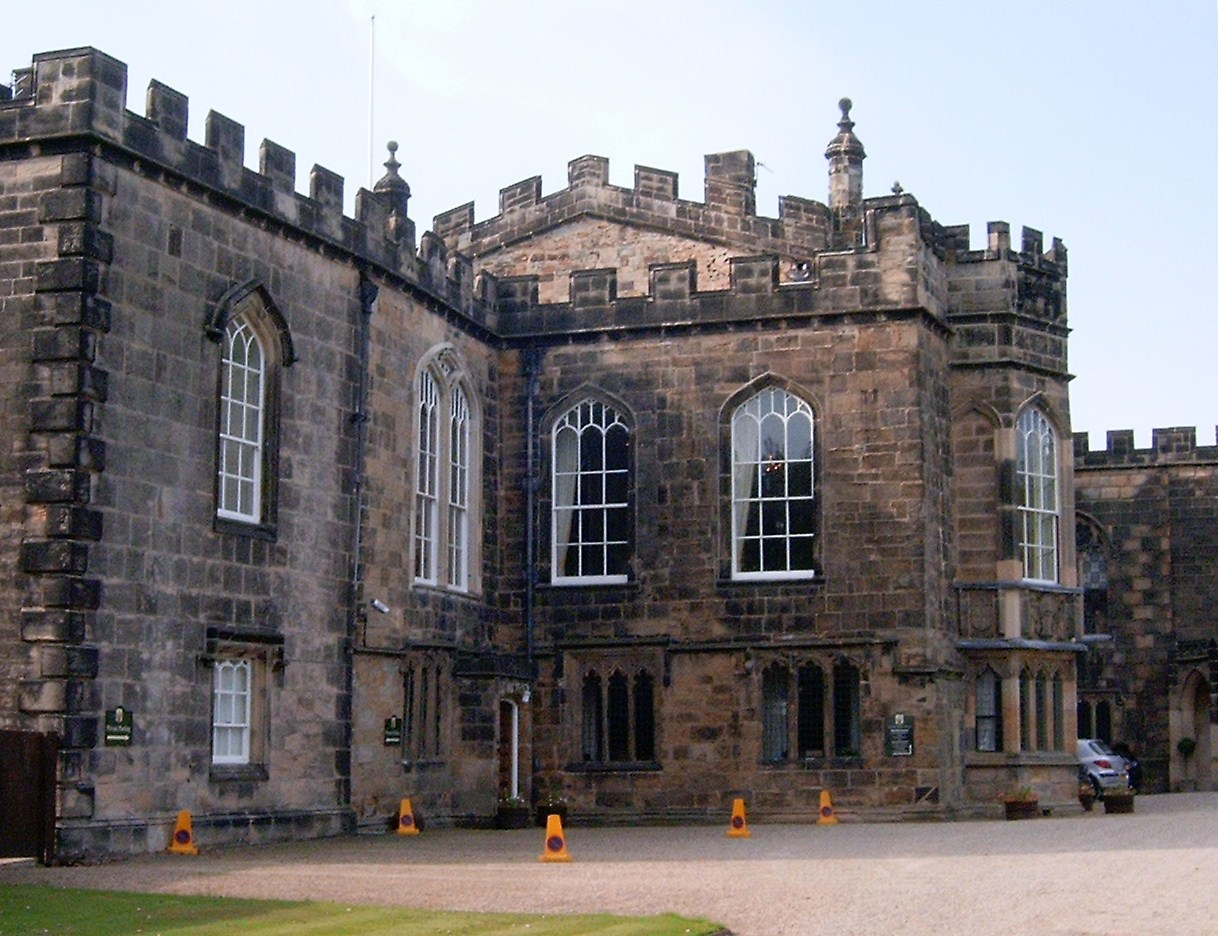
A portion of Auckland Castle

Much of the town's history surrounds its links with the Bishops of Durham. In 1083, Bishop William de St-Calais expelled a number of canons from Durham. Some of these settled in the area and established a collegiate church. Around 1183 Bishop Pudsey established a manor house in the town, with a great hall being completed in 1195 on the site occupied by St Peter's Chapel today. Bishop Bek, who preferred the town as his main residence over Durham Castle due to its proximity to hunting grounds, later converted the manor house into a castle. The grounds of the castle were noted as being large enough to contain 16,000 men ahead of the Battle of Neville's Cross in 1346.

Between 1283 and 1310, Bek was also responsible for ordering the replacement of the collegiate church established in 1183 with the Church of St Andrew that stands in South Church today, together with accommodation for the canons; the building known today as the East Deanery.

The collegiate church also appears to have supported a school. The collegiate church was re-organised under Bishop Langley in 1428 and at some point in the same century moved to the castle grounds. The college and its school were finally dissolved in the 16th century.

The school was not revived until the reign of King James I when in 1604 Anne Swifte petitioned the King to found a school and the Free Grammar School of King James, the direct antecedent of today's King James I school, was established. Although the school's early location is unknown, in 1638 Bishop Morton granted the school space in an old chapel in the Market Place.

Also in 1604, James's son, the future King Charles I made the first of three visits to the town. On this visit, his first to England, he was entertained by Bishop Matthew. In 1617 James himself stayed in Auckland Castle between 17 and 19 April. Later, on 8 May, at Durham Castle King James is reputed to have rebuked Bishop William James so badly that the Bishop returned to Auckland Castle and died three days later.

Charles's second visit to the town was on his way to Scotland on 31 May 1633, when he was entertained by Bishop Morton. His third visit on 4 February 1647 was in less lavish circumstances, as a prisoner. Morton had fled the town in 1640 and the castle was empty. Consequently, the king had to stay in a public house off the Market Place owned by Christopher Dobson.

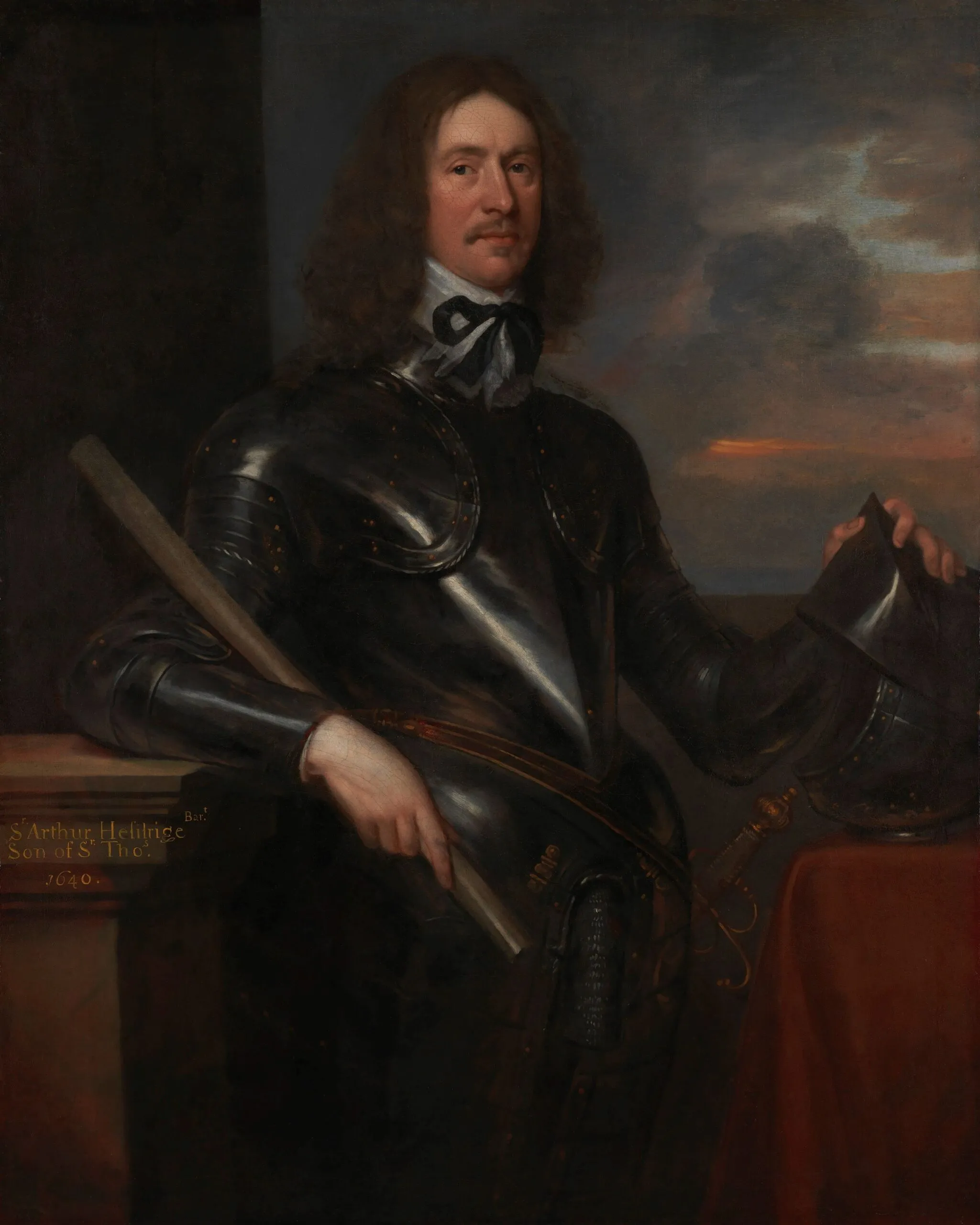
Sir Arthur Hazelrig

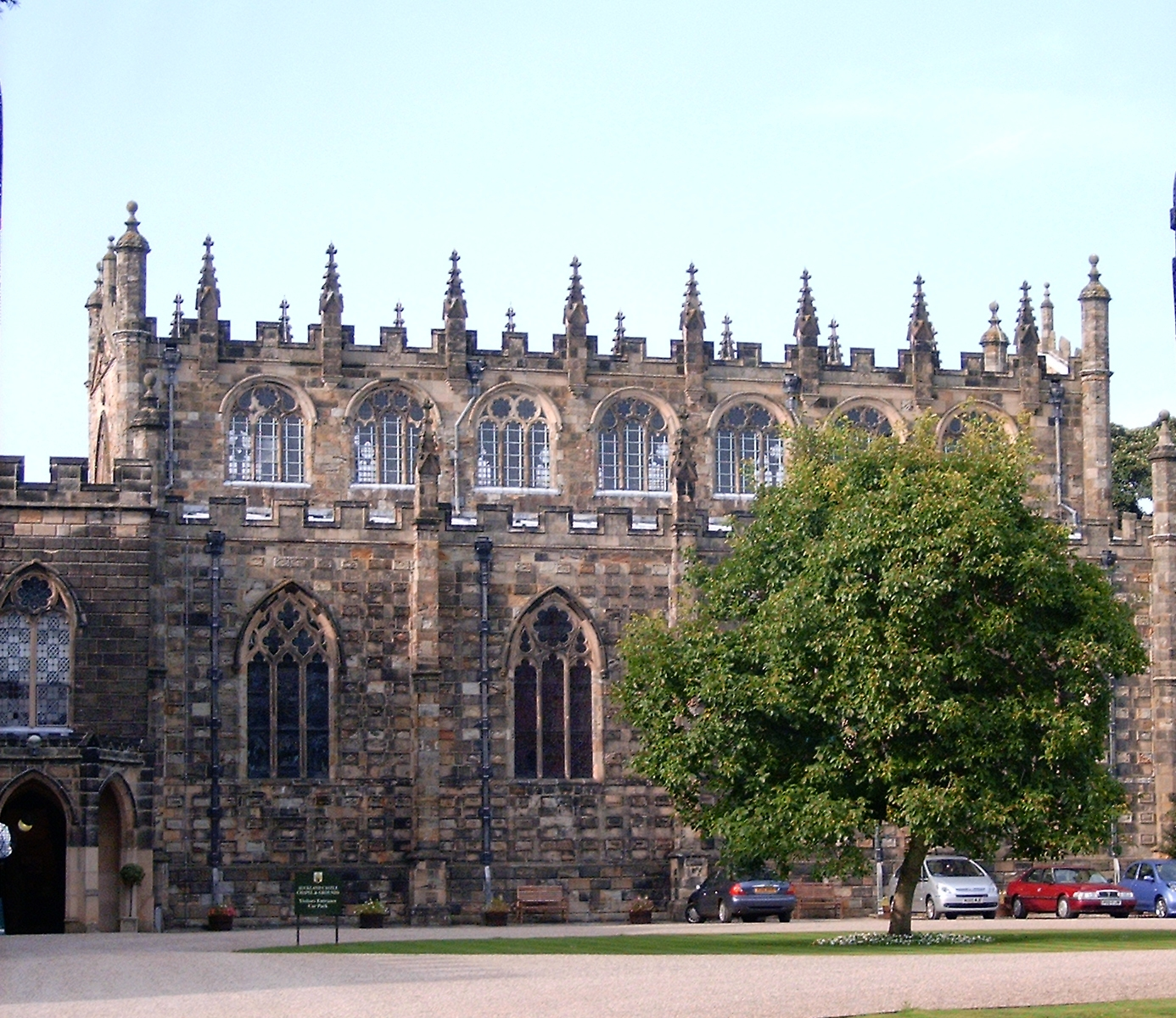
St Peter's chapel. Originally the castle's great hall, it was converted to a chapel after the restoration of the monarchy.

After the disestablishment of the Church of England, at the end of the first civil war, Auckland Castle was sold to Sir Arthur Hazelrig, who demolished much of the castle, including the chapel, and built a mansion. After the restoration of the monarchy, the new bishop of Durham, John Cosin, in turn demolished Hazelrig's mansion and rebuilt the castle converting the banqueting hall into the chapel that stands today.

=== Industrial Revolution ===
By 1801, the town had a population of 1,861. At the end of the eighteenth century the town had no notable roads other than the Roman road, and little trade beyond weaving. Although, coal mining had existed on a small-scale as early as 1183 when it is mentioned in the Boldon Book, it was limited by the lack of an easy way to transport coal away from the area. All this changed with the arrival of railways in the early nineteenth century, which allowed large scale coal mining. The railways allowed coal to be mined, and then transported to the coast before being put onto ships to London and even abroad.

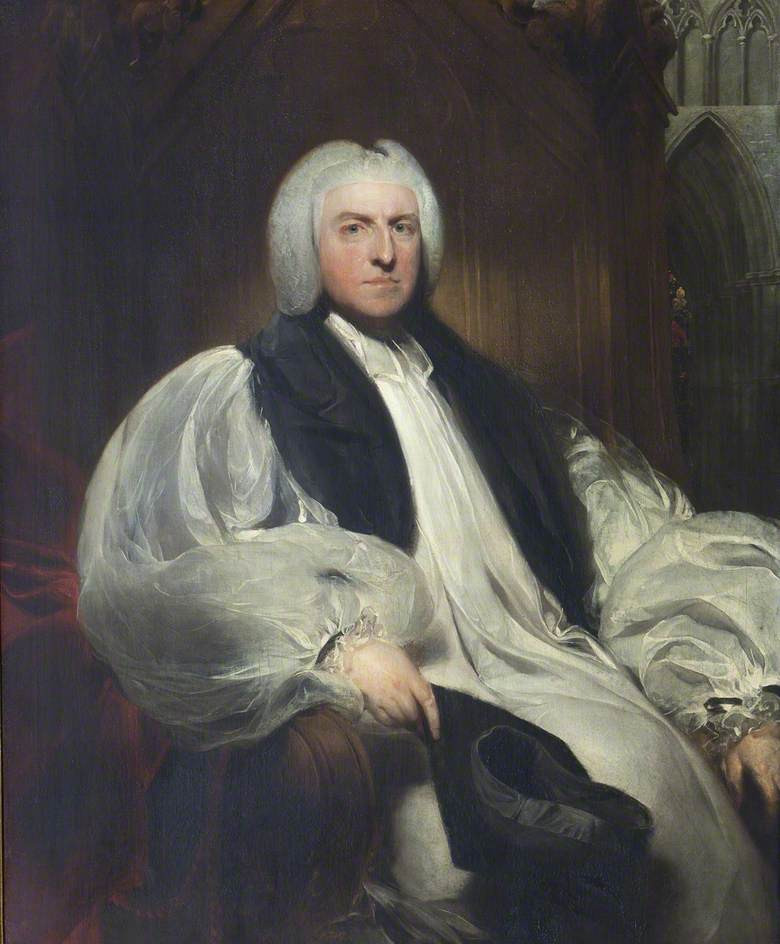
Shute Barrington

Around the same time, the bishop, Shute Barrington was a keen proponent of the use of education to improve the social and moral circumstances of the lower social classes. He used £70,000 received from lead mining royalties in Weardale to fund the establishment of a number of schools in the area. One of these schools was the Bishop Barrington School (now Bishop Barrington Academy), one of the town's three comprehensive schools today. The Bishop Barrington School opened on 26 May 1810, the Bishop's own birthday. The school even allowed girls to attend until the age of 11 years. Barrington's support of education for the poor was not without controversy. Some suggested education of the poor would lead people to question their position in society, others even blamed it for the French Revolution.

Barrington's successor, William van Mildert was involved in the creation of Durham University. Durham Castle was donated to the new university and Auckland Castle, usually the preferred residence by successive Bishops, became the Bishop of Durham's official residence in 1832. However, the influence of the bishops of Durham was on the wane and there was pressure for reform. Van Mildert would be the last ruler of the county palatine. Shortly after his death, in 1836, the position was stripped of its ancient powers and wealth.

The population at the time of the 1841 census was 3,776 inhabitants. By 1851 the population of the town had increased to 5,112, with a great proportion of them working in ironworks and collieries. By 1891, the population had doubled again. In the second half of the nineteenth century there were typically around 60 collieries in the area open at any one time. By the turn of the twentieth century 16,000 people were employed in the mining industry in the area.

The town also became an important centre for rail, with large amounts of minerals such as coal, limestone and ironstone mined in the surrounding area passing through the town on the way to the coast. In the neighbouring town of Shildon large numbers were employed in the railways, where a railway engine works was established.

=== Industrial decline ===
By the early years of the twentieth century coal mining started to go into decline as coal reserves started to become exhausted. By the end of the 1920s unemployment had hit 27% and the population too had started to decline, as colliery employment had halved compared with ten years previously. With the onset of the Great Depression unemployment rose to 60% in 1932 before easing back to 36% in 1937. The Second World War offered a temporary reprieve for the coal industry, however, after the war the decline continued. The last deep colliery in the area closed in 1968, although drift mines and the much more mechanised and less labour-intensive surface level opencast mining did continue.

Equally, the railways that had also supported the area were also scaled back, ultimately culminating in the closure of Shildon's Wagon works in 1984 with the loss of thousands of jobs.

A 2016 report on the community stated that

the rate of unemployment in Bishop Auckland is both higher than the average for and higher than the national average ... The rate of claiming any benefit (which includes in work benefits) is more than 25% higher in Bishop Auckland than the national average, suggesting that many people maybe under employed or on a low salary.

== Economy ==
At the end of the eighteenth century the town is noted as having little trade beyond weaving. The first mention of coal mining in the area is in the Boldon Book of 1183, but early coal mining was limited by the lack of an easy way to transport coal away from the area. The arrival of the railways transformed the town as it allowed coal to be mined, and then transported to the coast before being put onto ships to London and even abroad. At the start of the twentieth century 16,000 people were employed in the mining industry in the area. However, by 1915 the coal industry in the town had started to decline as coal reserves started to become exhausted. The last deep colliery in the area closed in 1968.

Today, with the decline of the Durham coalfield, manufacturing has been left as the largest sector of employment in the town, accounting for 24.6% of the town's employment.

The town also traditionally had a strong retail sector. As one of the county's main population centres with good bus and rail connections, and thriving markets on Thursdays and Saturdays, shoppers were attracted from smaller settlements on the Durham coalfield for miles around. However, the decline in the coal mining industry, along with increased car ownership and competition from local shopping malls such as the MetroCentre in Gateshead, have caused a downturn in the fortunes of retailers, with commentators lamenting the number of down market stores and charity shops in the town centre. In response, numerous initiatives to regenerate the town centre have been proposed, including the launch of the Bishop Auckland Town Centre Forum, and the 2006 regeneration master plan drawn up by Red Box Group, which was sponsored by Wear Valley District Council and the regional development agency One NorthEast. In 2015, Bishop Auckland was granted Heritage Action Zone status by Historic England, a 5-year programme that aimed to reinvigorate the town and its economy through tourism and its heritage.

Notable employers in the town include Ebac, which is headquartered in the town and employs 350 people.

A September 2019 report stated that Bishop Auckland was one of the towns designated to receive up £25 million to in funding from a new Towns Fund that was intended "to improve industrial areas that have not benefitted from economic growth in the same way as more prosperous areas." A Durham County Councillor said that the funds would help the partners (including the Auckland Project) to regenerate the town center area for the benefit of all residents of the community.

=== Building tourism in the town ===
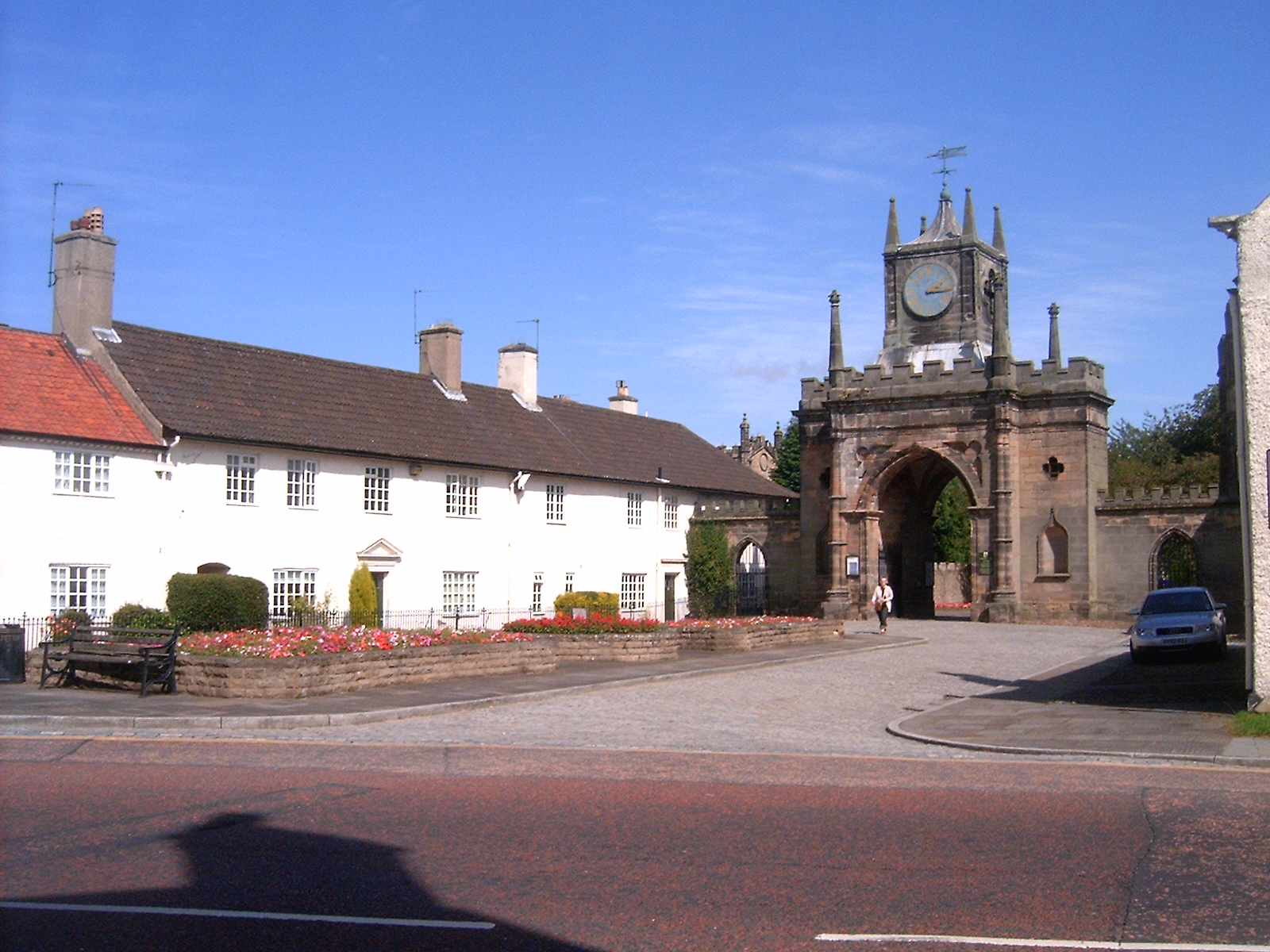
Auckland Castle gate and Market Place

An October 2019 article in The Guardian referred to Bishop Auckland as a "rundown town ... since the closure of the mines" but predicted that the re-opening of Auckland Castle would transform the community into a "leading tourist destination". The castle re-opened on 2 November 2019 after renovations by the Auckland Project; the founding partner of the group is the owner of the castle, Jonathan Ruffer who purchased the property and all of the contents in 2012, including the artwork, which included the works by Francisco de Zurbarán.

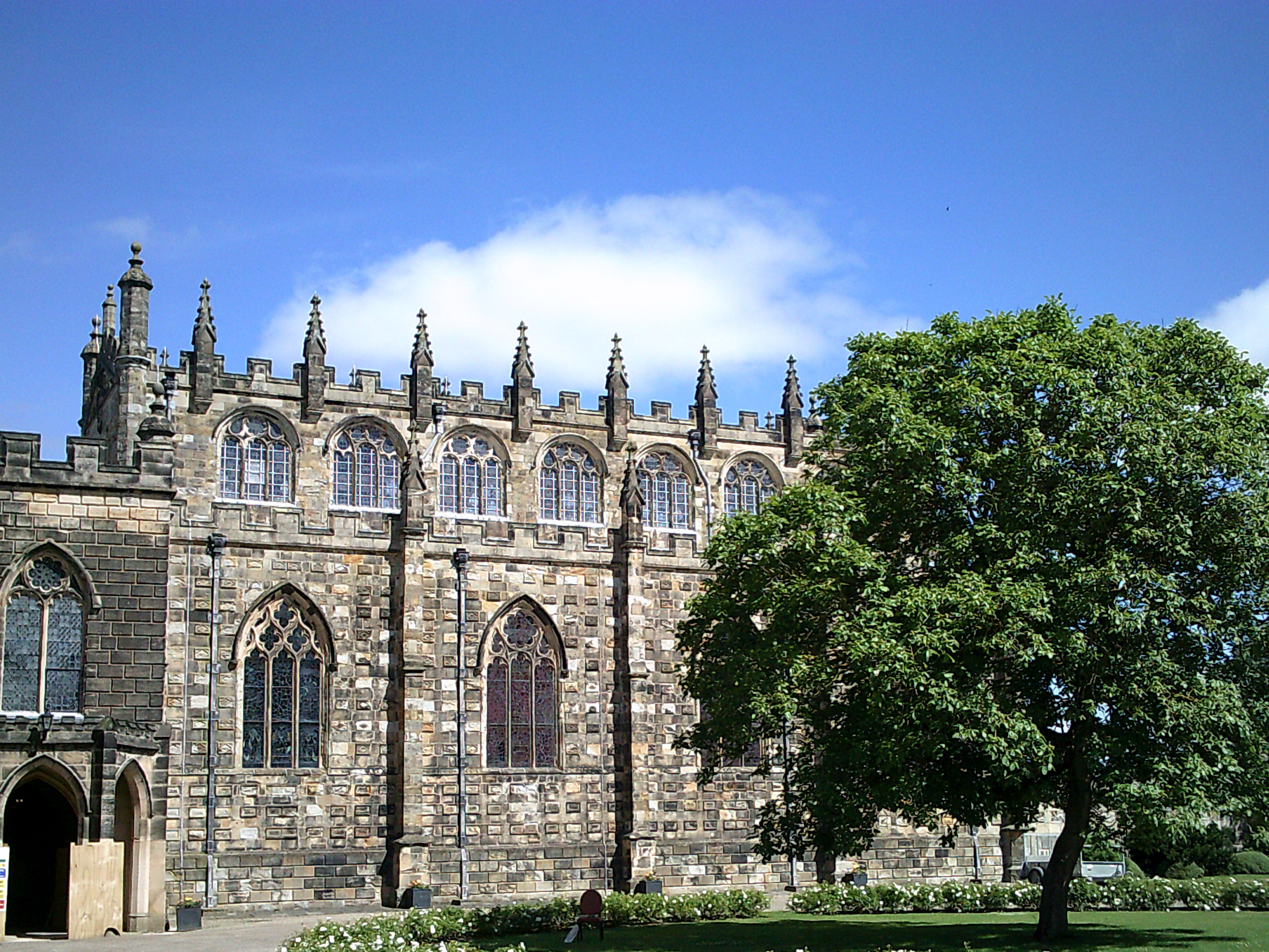
St. Peter's Chapel at Auckland Castle, formerly the Banqueting Hall

News reports in 2019 clarified the situation, stating that in 2012, Ruffer had purchased the castle and all of the contents, including the artwork, which included the works by Francisco de Zurbarán. The paintings which had been on tour, were returned to the site in time for the re-opening of the castle to visitors on 2 November 2019 as the Auckland Project, after a multi-million pound restoration project, funded partly by the National Lottery.

By the time of the opening day, a new 35 meter high tower had been erected as a visitor centre; the structure has a lift and a staircase as well as balconies for views of the castle from above. The interior had been fully restored, including the bishops' "palatial" quarters. According to one news item, "each of the 14 restored rooms, recreated from contemporary accounts and personal recollections" features the career of one former bishop. The Faith Museum of world religion and a huge glass greenhouse were under construction on Castle property.

Other attractions already operating at or near the Castle include the Mining Art Gallery (in a nearby former bank building in the town centre) showing work mainly by self-taught or night school-educated miners; this attraction opened in 2017 (thanks to support provided to the Castle Trust by Bishop Auckland and Shildon AAP and Durham County Council); a 7.5 acre open-air theatre, Kynren, on the other side of the River Wear, with a cast of 1,000 depicting the history of England; and the Bishop Trevor Gallery at the Castle. The latter started displaying the National Gallery's Masterpiece touring exhibit in October 2019.

In future, other attractions were expected to open in or near the town centre:

- the Spanish Gallery opened in 2021. The display of Spanish "Golden Age" art occupies two converted buildings one of which housed Backhouse's Bank)
- the Faith Museum opened in 2023. It is housed in the Scotland Wing of the castle and a purpose-built extension
- a gallery that will feature medieval to later era artworks
- a boutique hotel (in former pubs) and two restaurants in addition to the current bishop's Kitchen café.

According to The Guardian,

"The aim is to make the town – the heart of the abandoned Durham coalfields – a tourist destination that holds people for a day or two rather than just a couple of hours. The scheme will create hundreds of entry-level jobs in a county that suffers high unemployment and has some of the most deprived areas in northern Europe".

A Financial Times report in early November 2019 stated that "Kynren [theatre] has attracted 250,000 people and the Auckland Project, even with the castle closed, welcomed 35,500 visitors in the past year" to this community.

In 2025, The Daily Telegraph reported that Jonathan Ruffer had given at least £200 million to the Auckland Project.

== Governance ==
=== Historic ===
For a large part of the area's history, the autonomous powers held by the bishop of Durham meant that the county operated as a principality under England's protectorate. The UNESCO site describes the role of the bishops in the "buffer state between England and Scotland":

From 1075, the Bishop of Durham became a Prince-Bishop, with the right to raise an army, mint his own coins, and levy taxes. As long as he remained loyal to the king of England, he could govern as a virtually autonomous ruler, reaping the revenue from his territory, but also remaining mindful of his role of protecting England's northern frontier.

A steward of Bishop Antony Bek in the thirteenth century is quoted as saying England had two kings; the king and the bishop of Durham. A 1788 report states that the Bishops had the authority to appoint judges and barons and to offer pardons. The bishops of Durham were not stripped of the last of their secular powers until shortly after the death of Bishop William Van Mildert in 1836 by the Durham (County Palatine) Act 1836.

=== Modern ===
At the end of the nineteenth century the Local Government Act 1894 created Bishop Auckland Urban District council. From 1894 to 1974, the town was governed by the Urban District council within the administrative county of Durham. The district was enlarged to include a number of surrounding settlements in 1937 when Auckland Rural District and Willington Urban District were abolished. The Urban District was replaced, under the Local Government Act 1972, by a two tier district (Wear Valley) and county system.

The former urban district area was re-parished from the May 2007 local elections with a new town council was established. After the elections, the council elected Barbara Laurie as the town's first re-established mayor. On 25 July 2007, Durham County Council and Wear Valley District Council were replaced on 1 April 2009 by a single unitary authority serving the whole of County Durham.

=== Parliament ===
The town is a part of the Bishop Auckland parliamentary constituency, and is currently represented at Westminster by Sam Rushworth MP (Labour).

Prior to Brexit, for the European Parliament its residents voted to elect MEP's for the North East England constituency.

=== Other ===
The town is located in the South Area of the Durham Constabulary, and served by the County Durham and Darlington Fire and Rescue Service and North East Ambulance Service.

Bishop Auckland is twinned with the French town of Ivry-sur-Seine, whilst the wider Wear Valley district was twinned with Bad Oeynhausen in Germany.

=== Town Hall ===
The Town Hall is a "Gothic style" Victorian Building overlooking the town's market place and is Grade II* listed. After being abandoned and then condemned for demolition in the 1980s, the town hall was fully restored in the early 1990s. It now houses the town's main public library, a theatre, an art gallery, tourist information centre and a café-bar.

The Town Hall has held three exhibitions for mining artist Tom Lamb. The first was held in 1999 for his 'Fading Memories' exhibition, then in 2004 for Lamb's 'The Footprints of My Years' exhibition and in 2008 the last exhibition called 'My Mining Days' was held.

== Geography ==
Bishop Auckland is located at 54°39′36″N 1°40′48″W (British national grid reference system: NZ208294) on the Durham coalfield at the confluence of the River Wear with its tributary the River Gaunless. The town nestles in the rivers' valley about 100 metres (330 ft) above sea level. Besides this the town is all but is surrounded on all sides by hills ranging in height from around 150 metres (490 ft) above sea level to over 220 metres (720 ft) above sea level.

Bishop Auckland is located about 12 miles (19 km) northwest of Darlington and 12 miles (19 km) southwest of Durham. The town is served by Bishop Auckland railway station, which marks the point where the Tees Valley Line becomes the Weardale Railway. The town is not served directly by any motorways.

Notable wards include Cockton Hill, Woodhouse Close, and Henknowle. Additionally, once neighbouring villages such as South Church, Tindale Crescent, St Helen Auckland, and West Auckland now more or less merge seamlessly into the town.

== Demography ==
Bishop Auckland compared
UK Census 2001	Bishop Auckland	County Durham	England and Wales
Total population	24,392	493,484	52,041,916
Foreign born	1.5%	2.0%	8.9%
Buddhist	0.2%	0.1%	0.3%
Christian	84.8%	83.5%	71.7%
Hindu	0.2%	0.1%	1.1%
Muslim	0.2%	0.2%	3.0%
No religion	7.3%	9.3%	14.8%
Over 65 years old	17.2%	16.7%	15.46%
Unemployed	5.0%	4.8%	4.3%

According to the 2001 census, Bishop Auckland has a population of 24,392, living in 10,336 dwellings. Of these dwellings, around 44% are terraced houses, 33% semi-detached houses, and 17% detached houses. As shown in the graph, the distribution of ages in Bishop Auckland was broadly in-line with that of County Durham and England and Wales, although there is a slightly smaller proportion of people between 20 and 24 years old.

Compared with the national average, the town's population performs poorly with regard to qualifications. At 31.9%, the proportion of the town's population with no qualifications is significantly higher than the national average of 23.2% and 29.1%. Similarly, only 13.8% have a degree level qualification (or higher) compared with the national average of 21.1%.

84.8% of the town's population identify themselves as Christian, compared with a national average of 71.7%. There are below averages numbers identifying themselves as belonging to other religion. The people of the town are also more likely to be religious than the national average with only 7.3% stating they had no religion compared with the national average of 14.8%.

At 1.5% of the population, the town has a below average population of foreign born individuals, compared with a national average of 8.9%.

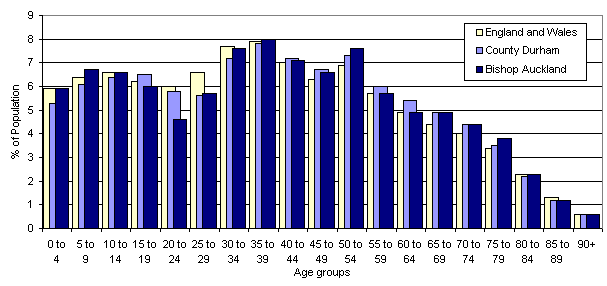
"Population pyramid" showing the breakdown of the Bishop Auckland's population vs Age compared with the figures for County Durham and England and Wales. Source:

== Landmarks ==
The town has a number of Grade I listed buildings. The grounds of Auckland Castle alone contain seven such structures. Additionally Escomb Saxon Church, St Andrew's parish church, St Helen's church, St Helen Hall, West Auckland Manor House, the East Deanery and the 14th century Bishop Skirlaw bridge are all Grade I listed. Other notable buildings include the town hall, a Victorian railway viaduct and Binchester Roman fort.

=== Auckland Castle ===
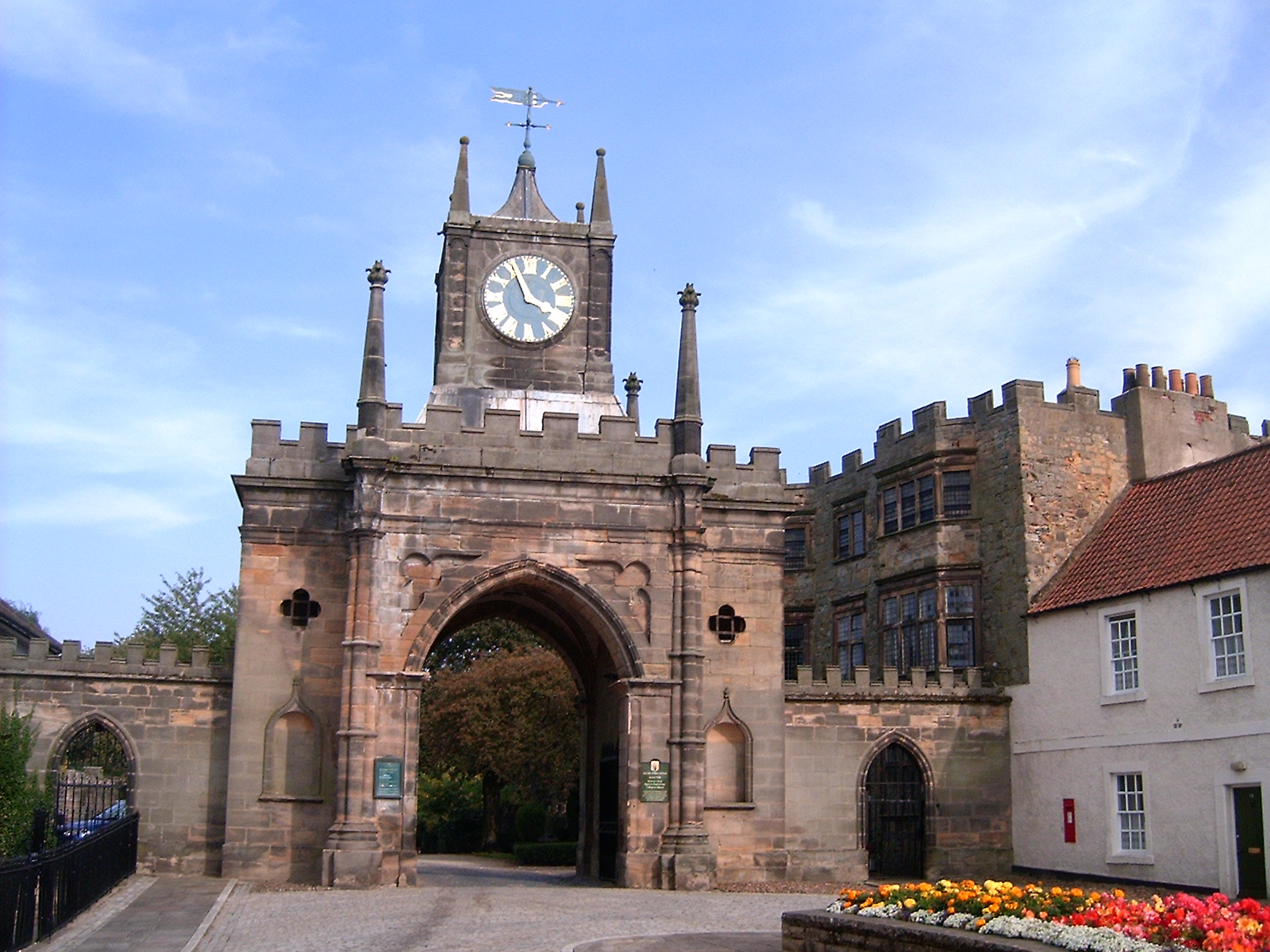
Auckland Castle's Gatehouse

Auckland Castle (often known locally as The Bishop's palace), was the official residence of the Bishop of Durham since 1832 until 2012. However, its history goes back much earlier, being established as a hunting lodge for the bishops of Durham. The castle is surrounded by 800 acres (3.2 km^{2}) of parkland, which was originally used by the Bishops for hunting and is today open to the public. The castle and its grounds contain seven Grade I listed structures.

The castle's long dining room is home to 12 of the 13 17th century portraits of Jacob and his 12 sons painted by Francisco de Zurbarán, which were saved by Bishop Trevor in 1756. Trevor was unable to secure the 13th, Benjamin, so commissioned Arthur Pond to produce a copy, which hangs alongside the 12 other originals.

Auckland Castle also provides the setting for Lewis Carroll's story "A Legend of Scotland".

In 2012, while Justin Welby was bishop of Durham, Jonathan Ruffer purchased Auckland Castle and all of the contents, including the artwork with the celebrated paintings by Zurbarán.

The castle opened to visitors in November 2019, after a multi-million pound restoration project. The site also includes three new restaurants for visitors, with one in operation by early November 2019.

Additional work continued at and near the castle to make the town a significant tourist attraction. Reports suggests that the revival of the area, dubbed the Auckland Project, will eventually cost a total of about £150m.

=== Binchester Roman Fort ===
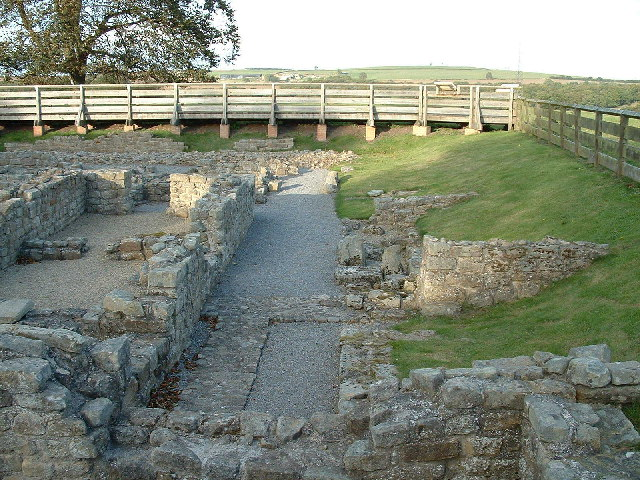
Binchester Roman Fort

The route of the Roman road Dere Street passes straight through the middle of the town on its way to the nearby Roman Fort at Binchester. Binchester Roman Fort, or Vinovia as it was known to the Romans, has one of the best preserved examples of a Roman military bath house hypocaust in the country. Bishop Auckland's main shopping street, Newgate Street, together with Cockton Hill Road and Watling Road faithfully follow the route of Dere Street. Watling Road should not be confused with the Roman road Watling Street, which is in the South of England.

== Transport ==
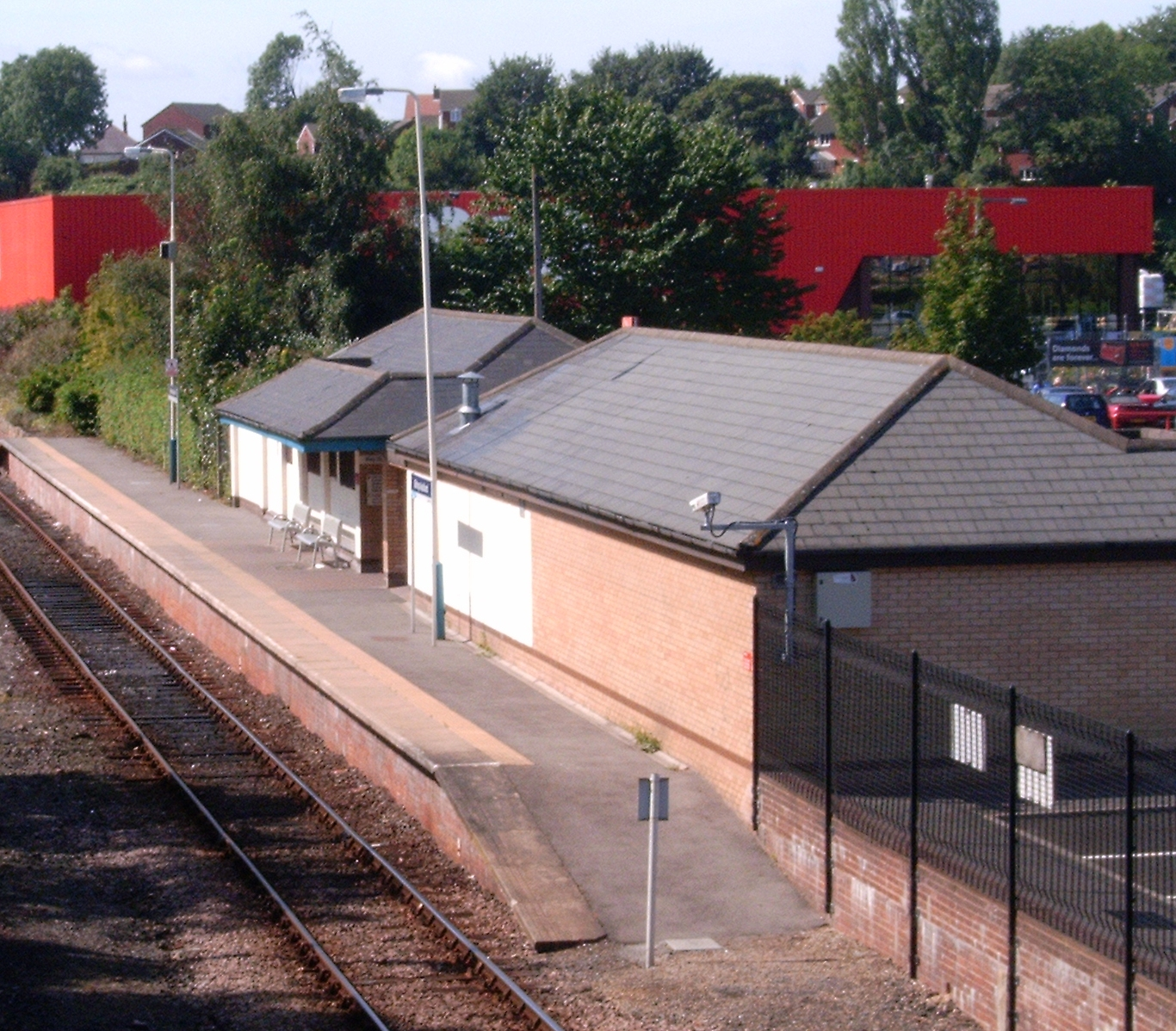
Bishop Auckland railway station

The town has links with the birth of the railways, with the original 1825 route of the Stockton and Darlington Railway passing through West Auckland. Timothy Hackworth, a well-known locomotive builder, built steam locomotives in the neighbouring town of Shildon.

Today, Bishop Auckland railway station still provides passenger services, and is located at the end of the Tees Valley line. Since May 2010 it has been re-connected with the Weardale Railway, which provides passenger services up the valley to Stanhope. The town centre had a large railway goods yard until 1972. Freight traffic ceased to use the line completely in 1993 when Blue Circle cement stopped using the line to transport cement from its works in Eastgate.

The nearest airport to the town is Teesside Airport at around 19 miles (31 km) drive South-East of Bishop Auckland. The nearest motorway junction is Junction 60 of the A1(M), which is around 8 miles (13 km) away.

The town has a bus station with a number of bus routes serving the town. Following the withdrawal of Go North East from the town on 8 April 2006, most of these services are provided by Arriva North East. However, a number of smaller firms such as Weardale Buses also serve the town.

=== Newton Cap viaduct ===
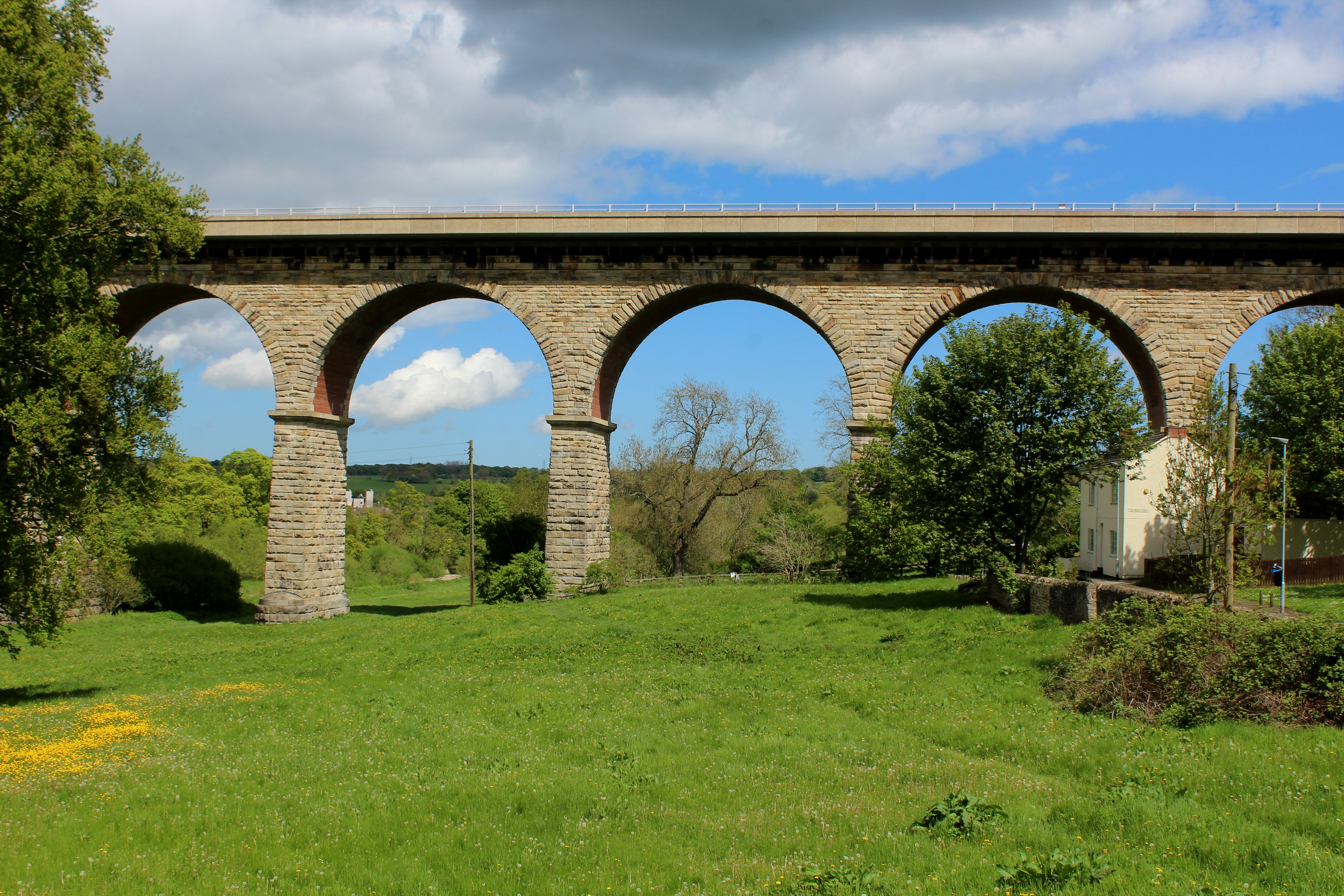
Newton Cap Viaduct

The town also has a Grade II listed Victorian railway viaduct crossing the River Wear. At 105 feet (32 m) high, the viaduct provides views of the surrounding countryside below as well as Auckland Castle, the Bishop's Park and the Town Hall on approaching the town from the Viaduct. It was originally built in 1857 to carry the Bishop Auckland to Durham City railway line across the River Wear and the Newton Cap Bank that leads down to the river. The railway closed in 1968 and the viaduct fell into a period of disuse and was at one point threatened with demolition. However, in 1995, the viaduct was converted for vehicle use to take traffic on the A689 between Bishop Auckland and Crook, relieving the Grade I listed fourteenth-century single-lane Bishop Skirlaw bridge which sits in the valley below it.

On the north side of the bridge sits Eleven Arches Flatts Farm (named after the number of arches in the viaduct) which hosts Kynren, a local historical performance.

== Education ==
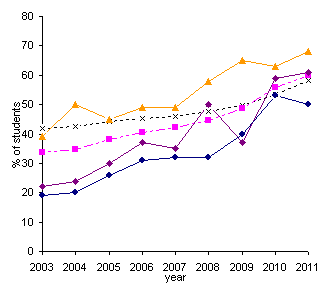
Chart showing the percentage of pupils at each school achieving 5+ GCSEs (including Maths and English) at grade A*–C compared with national and LEA averages. Legend Bishop Barrington Academy King James I Academy St John's Catholic School National average LEA average

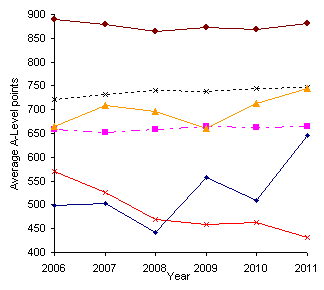
Graph showing average A-Level points score per students at sixth form's attended by Bishop Auckland students, compared with the national average and Durham LEA average. The A-Level points system changed in 2006 and results from before then cannot be compared with present results. Legend Queen Elizabeth Sixth Form College King James I Academy St John's Catholic School Bishop Auckland College National average LEA average

The town itself has three secondary schools—St John's Catholic School, The Bishop Barrington Academy and King James I Academy. The town also has a college, Bishop Auckland College serving the Further Education and Higher Education fields. Both Bishop Barrington and King James schools have long histories, being founded in 1810 by Bishop Barrington and in 1604 on the orders of King James I respectively.

In the government's Level 2 CVA (Contextual Value Added) statistic, which measures how much a school improves students between the end of National Curriculum Key Stage 2 and the end of Key Stage 4, compared with how much other schools in the country improve students with similar circumstances, King James scored 1039.9 points, Barrington 1019.3 points and St John's scored a below average 997.4 points (with 1000 points being the target baseline).

At A-Level in 2009, none of the towns sixth form centres average points scores reached the national average of 739.1 A-Level points per student or the LEA average of 664.1 points. Amongst sixth form centres in the town, St John's performed best with an average score of 661.5 points per student. In comparison, King James had an average A-Level score of 557 points and Bishop Auckland College with 459.3 points taking last position in the LEA in terms of A-Level point score, a position occupied by King James in the previous year. The Bishop Barrington Academy no longer has its own sixth form, with the school being a feeder for Queen Elizabeth Sixth Form College in Darlington. The average A-Level points score at Queen Elizabeth is 871.8. The needs of those with special educational needs are served by Evergreen Primary.

The town is served also by the following primary schools; Cockton Hill Infant, Cockton Hill Junior, Copeland Road Primary, Etherley Lane Primary, Oakley Cross Primary, St Andrew's Primary, St Anne's CofE Primary, St Helen Auckland Community Primary, St Wilfrid's RC Primary, Woodhouse Community Primary, Evergreen Primary School, Prince Bishops Community Primary School.

Durham University's Zurbarán Centre for Spanish and Latin American Art is located at Roper House in the centre of Bishop Auckland and offers postgraduate degrees (MA and PhD).

== Public services ==
=== Healthcare ===
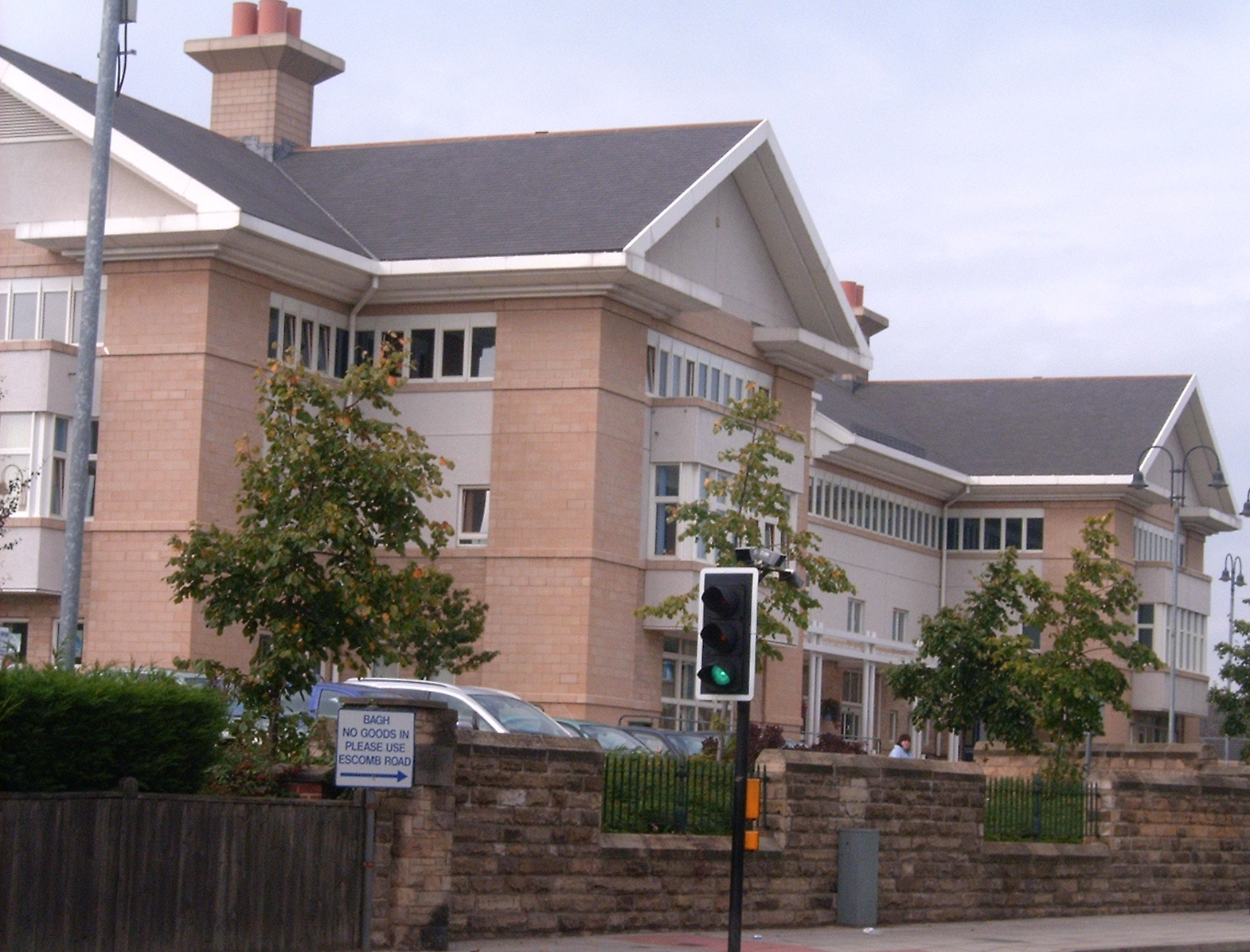
Bishop Auckland General Hospital

As is the case with the rest of the United Kingdom, the population of the town is served by the National Health Service (NHS). The town has its own NHS hospital, Bishop Auckland General Hospital. The current Bishop Auckland General Hospital has 286 beds, and since opening in 2002 has become a centre specialising in routine surgery. Although Bishop Auckland General Hospital was built with an Accident and Emergency department, this was closed and replaced with an "Urgent Care Centre" in 2009, when the local NHS trust concentrated acute health care services at Durham and Darlington, and moved more routine surgery to Bishop Auckland General.

The new hospital was a PFI project and was announced by the Labour government in the summer of 1997. and temporary huts constructed during World War II.

Other local hospitals include Darlington Memorial Hospital and University Hospital of North Durham, which has replaced Durham Dryburn and was announced on the same day as the new Bishop Auckland General. All three of these hospitals are run by County Durham and Darlington NHS Foundation Trust, which provides secondary health care services in the area. The local ambulance service is North East Ambulance Service.

=== Utilities ===
Bishop Auckland's water and sewerage is managed by Northumbrian Water. Water supply comes from Burnhope Reservoir via the Wear Valley water treatment works at Wearhead. The present treatment works replaced old works on the site of the present one and another one closer to the town at Tunstall Reservoir. Contrary to popular belief, the town does not receive water from Kielder Reservoir. Although water from Kielder can be pumped into the River Wear, via the Tyne–Tees tunnel, upstream at Frosterley, this water is not abstracted from the river until it reaches Chester-le-Street. Equally, although water can be pumped from the tunnel into Waskerley Reservoir, which in turn supplies Tunstall Reservoir, Tunstall water treatment works was closed in 2004, when the new Wear Valley works was brought into service.

The electricity distribution network operator for the area is the CE Electric-owned NEDL (Northern Electric Distribution Limited). There are no power stations in the town.

== Religion ==
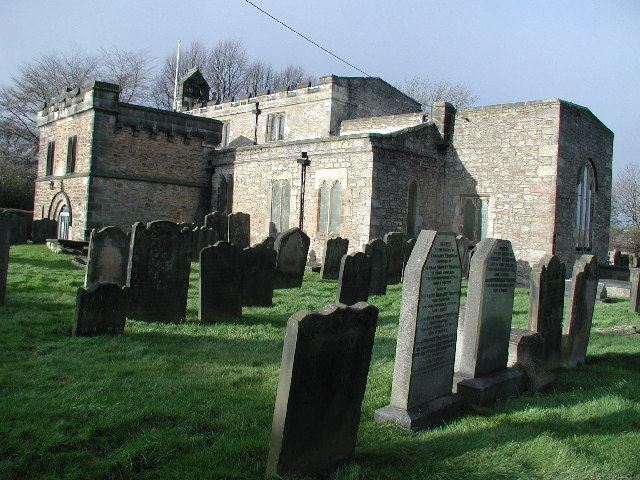
St Helen's

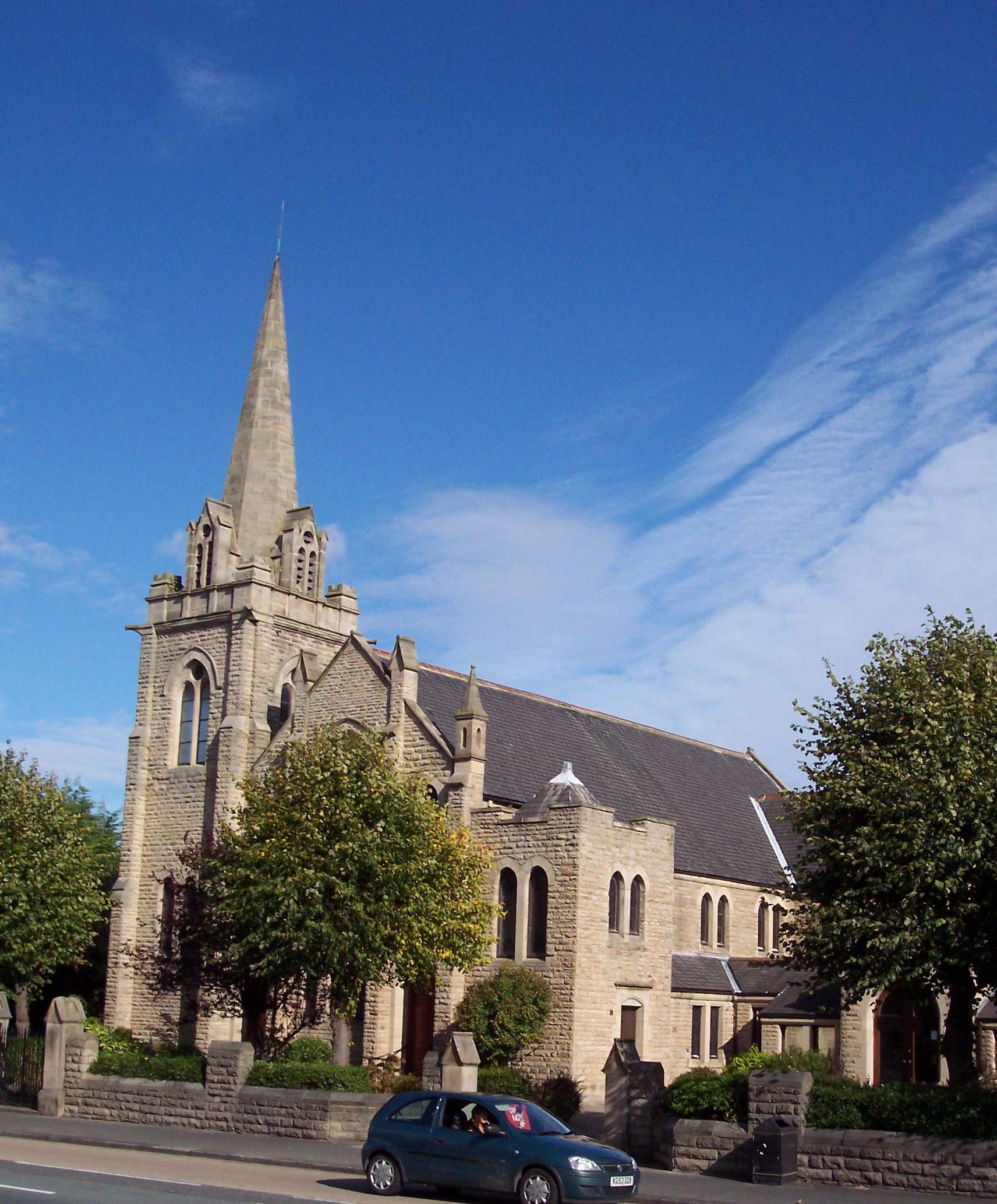
The methodist church

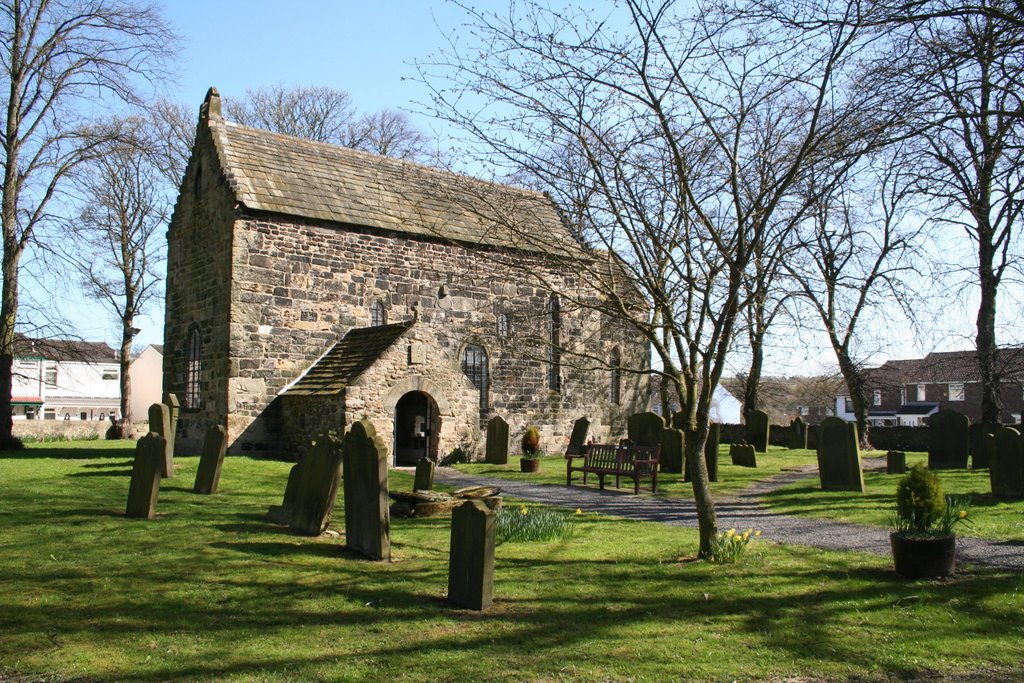
Escomb Church

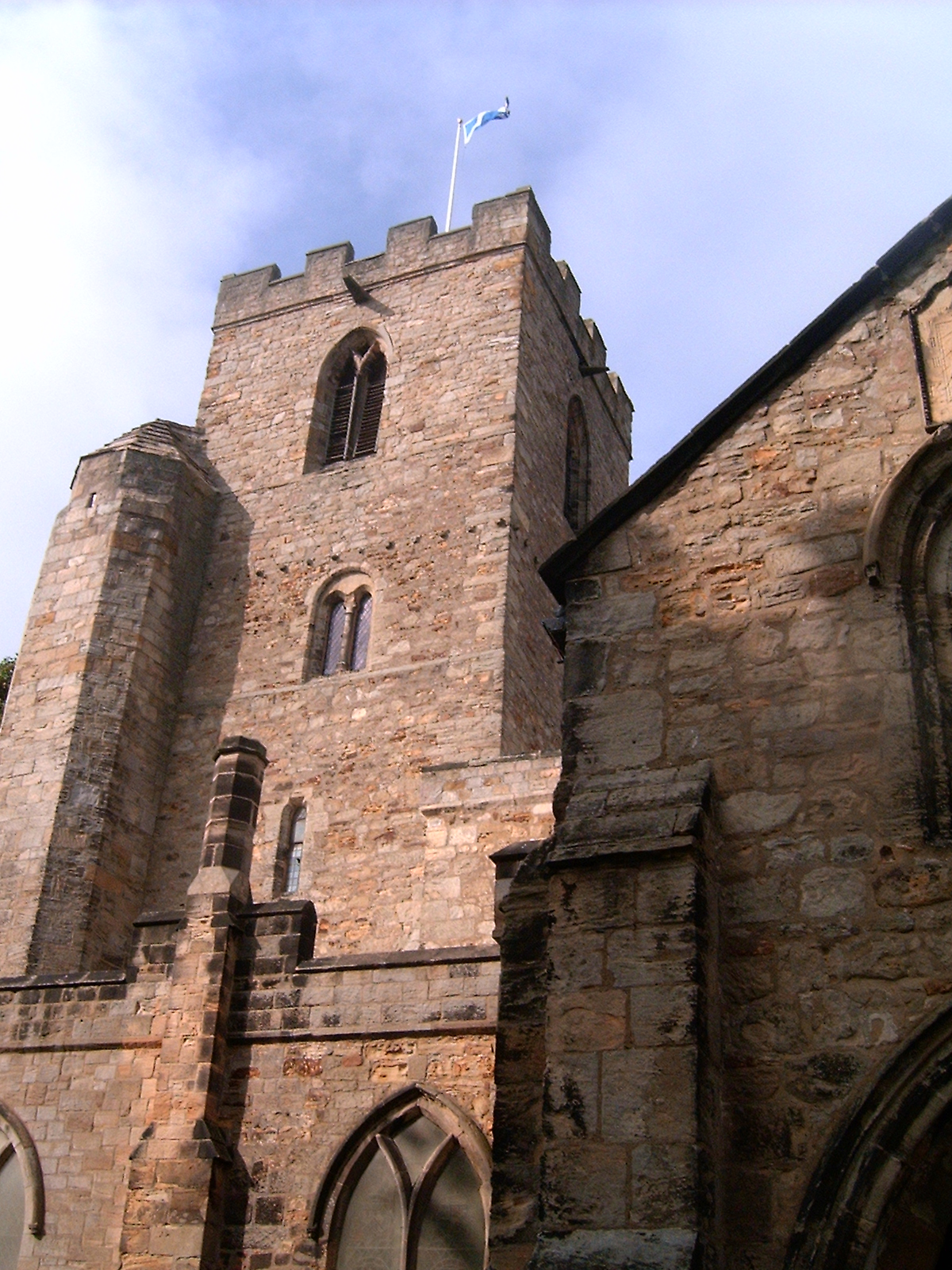
St Andrew's

The town is in the Auckland Deanery and Archdeaconry of the Anglican Diocese of Durham. The diocese has its administrative offices at Auckland Castle in the town. In the Roman Catholic faith, the town is located in the St William Deanery of the Cleveland and South Durham Episcopal Area, Hexham and Newcastle Diocese. Bishop Auckland Baptist Church is part of the family of the Baptist Union of Great Britain. and is part of the Northern Association of Baptist churches

=== Grade listed churches ===
The town has three Grade I listed churches: the Church of St Helen, the Church of St Andrew, and St Peter's chapel at Auckland Castle. Three grade II listed churches are in the town: Bishop Auckland Methodist Church on Cockton Hill Road, St Anne's church next to the town hall in the Market Place, and St Peter's Church on Princes Street.

=== Nearby villages ===
The nearby village of Escomb is home to a complete Anglo-Saxon church. It is believed the church was built between the years 670 and 690. Much of the stone used to construct the church came from the nearby Roman fort at Binchester, with some stones having Roman markings on them. The church is a Grade I listed structure.

St Andrew's church located in the adjoining village of South Church is the largest church in County Durham and a Grade I listed building. The church was built in the thirteenth century and acted as a collegiate church.

== Sport ==
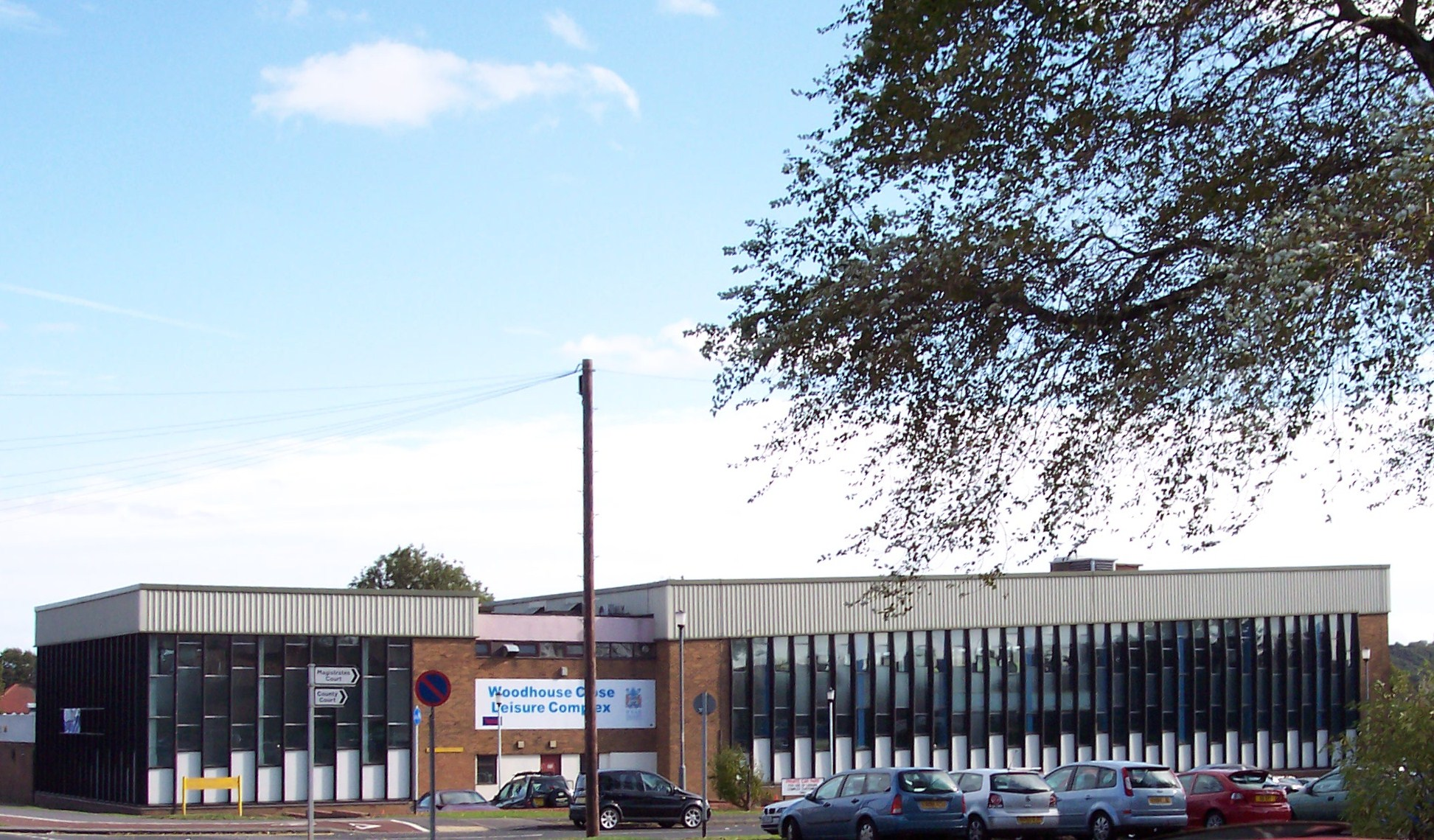
Woodhouse Close Leisure Complex

Bishop Auckland is famous for its amateur football team, Bishop Auckland F.C., which won the FA Amateur Cup a record 10 times in the Trophy's 80-year history, having appeared in the Final on 18 occasions. Bishop Auckland Football Club also helped out Manchester United after the Munich air disaster in 1958 by donating three of their players, Derek Lewin, Bob Hardisty and Warren Bradley. In return in 1996, Manchester United played a friendly against Bishop Auckland to help raise money when the club was threatened with bankruptcy after a member of a rival team sued over an injury. In 2007 Manchester United donated floodlights to Bishop Auckland Football Club, which the club has added to their new ground, Heritage Park. These floodlights have subsequently been upgraded to LED.

In terms of sports facilities, Woodhouse Close Leisure Complex, a council run leisure centre, has a 25-by-10-metre (82 by 33 ft) swimming pool and a 10-by-5-metre (33 by 16 ft) "learner" pool, as well as a gym, sauna, steam room and spa pool. Additionally, football pitches, tennis courts and bowling greens are provided at the Town Recreation Ground and Cockton Hill Recreation Ground. Henknowle Recreation Ground has a 5 a side pitch and a basketball court.

== Notable people ==
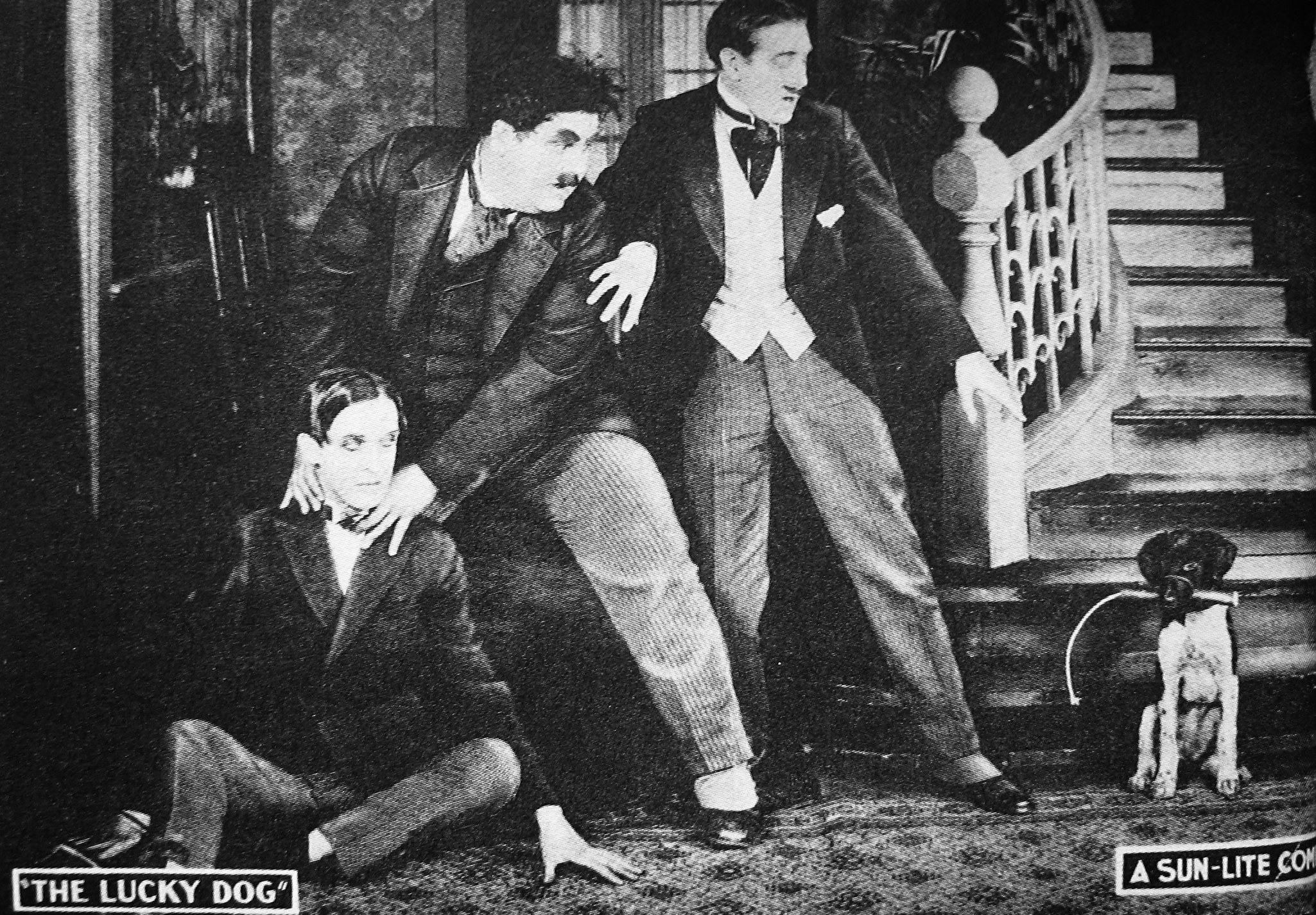
Stan Laurel (left) lived in the town during his childhood

- Stan Laurel of the comedy duo Laurel and Hardy
- William George Armstrong, nineteenth century industrialist
- William Atkinson, architect
- John Bird, scientific instrument maker
- Eds Chesters, drummer for The Bluetones and Soho
- Jeremiah Dixon, astronomer and surveyor of the Mason–Dixon line
- James Craggs the Elder, 17th century politician
- Frederick William Faber, theologian and catholic priest
- Robert Kaye Greville, botanist
- Christopher Hancock, who played Charlie Cotton in EastEnders
- Fiona Hill, American foreign affairs specialist
- Dan Jones, footballer for Spennymoor Town
- Sister Hilda Marley, educator and psychologist in Glasgow
- Sir Alan Meale, the Member of Parliament (MP) for Mansfield from 1987 to 2017
- Scarlett Moffatt, television presenter
- Harold Orton, linguist
- Craig Raine, poet and critic
- Thomas Wilfred Sharp, town planner
- Peter Soulsby, the current Mayor of Leicester
- Amy Tinkler, artistic gymnast
- Ross Turnbull, goalkeeper for Chelsea F.C.
- Charlie Wayman, footballer who played for Newcastle United, Middlesbrough and Southampton
- Thomas Wright, astronomer

== Climate ==
Bishop Auckland

Climate chart (precipitation, max. and min. temperature)
J	F	M	A	M	J	J	A	S	O	N	D
56 6 1	39 7 1	51 9 2	52 11 3	50 15 6	55 17 9	45 20 11	61 20 11	58 17 9	57 13 6	62 9 3	59 7 2
- █ Average max. and min. temperatures in °C
- █ Precipitation totals in mm
Imperial conversion
J	F	M	A	M	J	J	A	S	O	N	D
2.2 43 33	1.5 44 33	2 48 36	2 52 38	1.9 58 42	2.2 63 47	1.8 68 51	2.4 67 51	2.3 62 47	2.2 55 43	2.4 48 38	2.3 45 35
- █ Average max. and min. temperatures in °F
- █ Precipitation totals in inches

The nearest Met Office weather station to Bishop Auckland is located 8 miles (13 km) north-east of Bishop Auckland in Durham. The following local figures were gathered at this weather station between 1971 and 2000.

Like the vast majority of the United Kingdom, Bishop Auckland has an oceanic climate (Cfb in the Köppen climate classification). At 643.3 millimetres (25.33 in) the average annual rainfall is lower than the national average of 1,125 millimetres (44.3 in). Equally there are only around 121.3 days where more than 1 millimetre (0.039 in) of rain falls compared with a national average of 154.4 days. The area sees on average 1374.6 hours of sunshine per year, compared with a national average of 1354.9 hours. There is frost on 52 days compared with a national average of 55.6 days. Average daily maximum and minimum temperatures are 12.5 and 5.2 °C (54.5 and 41.4 °F) compared with a national averages of 12.1 and 5.1 °C (53.8 and 41.2 °F) respectively.

Climate data for Durham Coordinates 54°46′04″N 1°35′04″W; elevation: 102 m (335 ft) 1991–2020 normals, extremes 1843–2023
Month	Jan	Feb	Mar	Apr	May	Jun	Jul	Aug	Sep	Oct	Nov	Dec	Year
Record high °C (°F)	16.3 (61.3)	17.4 (63.3)	21.8 (71.2)	24.1 (75.4)	29.7 (85.5)	30.7 (87.3)	36.9 (98.4)	32.5 (90.5)	30.0 (86.0)	25.3 (77.5)	19.3 (66.7)	15.9 (60.6)	36.9 (98.4)
Mean daily maximum °C (°F)	6.9 (44.4)	7.8 (46.0)	9.9 (49.8)	12.5 (54.5)	15.4 (59.7)	18.0 (64.4)	20.2 (68.4)	19.9 (67.8)	17.4 (63.3)	13.5 (56.3)	9.7 (49.5)	7.1 (44.8)	13.2 (55.8)
Daily mean °C (°F)	4.1 (39.4)	4.6 (40.3)	6.2 (43.2)	8.3 (46.9)	10.9 (51.6)	13.6 (56.5)	15.8 (60.4)	15.6 (60.1)	13.3 (55.9)	10.0 (50.0)	6.6 (43.9)	4.2 (39.6)	9.5 (49.1)
Mean daily minimum °C (°F)	1.3 (34.3)	1.4 (34.5)	2.5 (36.5)	4.1 (39.4)	6.5 (43.7)	9.3 (48.7)	11.3 (52.3)	11.3 (52.3)	9.2 (48.6)	6.5 (43.7)	3.6 (38.5)	1.4 (34.5)	5.7 (42.3)
Record low °C (°F)	−16.9 (1.6)	−18.0 (−0.4)	−15.0 (5.0)	−11.1 (12.0)	−4.8 (23.4)	−0.8 (30.6)	1.4 (34.5)	0.0 (32.0)	−1.7 (28.9)	−5.3 (22.5)	−12.0 (10.4)	−16.4 (2.5)	−18.0 (−0.4)
Average precipitation mm (inches)	51.8 (2.04)	44.6 (1.76)	41.1 (1.62)	51.2 (2.02)	44.4 (1.75)	61.0 (2.40)	60.9 (2.40)	66.5 (2.62)	56.9 (2.24)	63.4 (2.50)	73.0 (2.87)	61.0 (2.40)	675.7 (26.60)
Average precipitation days (≥ 1.0 mm)	11.8	9.9	8.6	9.1	8.6	9.9	10.7	10.3	9.4	11.8	12.0	12.0	124.1
Mean monthly sunshine hours	60.9	84.4	121.7	160.8	187.1	167.1	174.3	167.3	135.3	98.9	64.6	57.6	1,480
Source 1: Met Office
Source 2: Durham Weather

== See also ==
- Baron Foster of Bishop Auckland
- Baron Auckland
- Raby Castle

== Bibliography ==
- Fordyce, William (1857), The History and Antiquities of the County Palatine of Durham, A. Fullarton and Co.
- Hutchinson, Tom (2009), South Church Memories of an ancient Auckland community, Newcastle-upon-Tyne: Summerhill Books, ISBN 978-1-906721-15-2
- Hutchinson, Tom (2005), The History of Bishop Auckland, Seaham: The People's History, ISBN 978-1-902527-59-8
- Simpson, David A (1991), Prince Bishop country the people history and folklore of County Durham and the River Wear, North Pennine Publishing, ISBN 978-1-874617-00-6
- Simpson, David A (2002), Northern Roots, Sunderland: Business Education Publishers, ISBN 978-1-901888-35-5
- Whellan, William (1856), History, Topography, and Directory of the County Palatine of Durham, William Whellan and Co.
