= Gary Innes (footballer) =

English footballer (born 1977)

Personal information
- Full name: Gary John Innes
- Date of birth: 7 October 1977
- Place of birth: Shotley Bridge, England
- Height: 5 ft 10 in (1.78 m)
- Position: Forward

Team information
- Current team: Tow Law Town (joint manager)

Youth career
- Years: Team
- 1994–1995: Sheffield United
	Darlington	15	(0)
1997	→ Waterford United (loan)		
1997–1998	Gateshead	35	(5)
1998–	West Auckland Town		
–2000	Seaham Red Star		
2000–2002	Blyth Spartans		
2002	Tow Law Town		
2002–2003	Whitley Bay		
2003	Blyth Spartans		
2003–2004	Tow Law Town		
2004–2007	Whickham		
2008	Annfield Plain		

Managerial career
- 2015: Bedlington Terriers
- 2015–2016: Willington
- 2021–2022: Durham United
- 2023–: Tow Law Town (joint manager)

Gary John Innes (born 7 October 1977) is an English former footballer who played as a forward in the Football League for Darlington. He began his career with Sheffield United, though never played for their first team, spent a short spell with League of Ireland club Waterford United, and played non-league football for numerous clubs in the north-east of England. He represented England at youth level.

== Life and career ==
Innes was born in Shotley Bridge, County Durham. He was diagnosed diabetic at the age of nine. He attended St Bede's Catholic School in Lanchester, which he left in 1994 to take up an apprenticeship at First Division club Sheffield United, where his older brother Lee was already on the books. He left after a year to resume his education at Derwentside College, where he studied leisure and tourism. He also played for County Durham schools at under-19 level, and made four appearances for the English Schools' under-18 team in 1996. He also represented England at youth level.

He signed for Darlington ahead of the 1996–97 season, and made his Football League debut on 17 August 1996, as a late substitute in a 3–2 defeat away to Hull City in the Third Division. Described as "a nippy, twisting and turning former English under-18 striker with good close control", Innes spent time on loan with League of Ireland club Waterford United in early 1997, playing and scoring in the League of Ireland. He played three times for Darlington on his return, and was released in March 1997 to join Conference club Gateshead.

Innes played the last eight games of the 1996–97 Football Conference season, scored the only goal of the game away to Dover Athletic, and scored a further four times from 27 Conference appearances in 1997–98. He continued in non-league football, mainly in the Northern League, for West Auckland Town, Seaham Red Star, Northern Premier League club Blyth Spartans, and Tow Law Town, where he had little first-team football so submitted a transfer request. He left for Whitley Bay, but a few months later rejoined Blyth Spartans. By September 2003 Innes had returned to Tow Law, and in March 2004, he signed for Whickham. In early 2005, a large benign tumour was removed from behind his eye; he was playing for Whickham within weeks of the operation, and was still with the club two years later. He appeared for Annfield Plain in 2008.

From 2010, he was assistant manager of two of his former clubs, Tow Law Town and then Whickham, before spending the last few months of the 2014–15 season as manager of Northern League Bedlington Terriers. He took over as manager of Northern League Second Division club Willington in October 2015, and left the following September. In the 2021–22 season, Innes managed Wearside League club Durham United. He and Dion Raitt were appointed joint managers of Northern League Division Two club Tow Law Town in October 2023.
