= Bishop Auckland College =

Coordinates: 54.6509°N 1.6957°W

Location
- Woodhouse Lane; Bishop Auckland, Co Durham, DL14 6JZ; England

Information
- Type: Further Education College
- Local authority: Durham
- Department for Education URN: 130657 Tables
- Ofsted: Reports
- Chairman of the Corporation: Patrick Lonergan
- Principal: Shaun Hope
- Gender: Coeducational
- Age: 15+
- Enrolment: 3,000
- Website: www.bacoll.ac.uk

Bishop Auckland College (formerly Bishop Auckland Technical College) is a further education college located in the town of Bishop Auckland, County Durham, England. It is located on Woodhouse Lane next to St John's Catholic School, and opposite Bishop Barrington Academy.

== History ==
Bishop Auckland College began life as a Technical Institute with classes being run in the Mechanics Institute in Victoria Avenue and other town centre locations. In September 1950 the Technical Institute was opened in the old Railway Offices, Station Approach. Enrolment in 1950/51 was 250 part-time day and evening students.

It was the demand for engineering courses needed by local industry that led to the first buildings for the Bishop Auckland Technical College (now Bishop Auckland College) on Woodhouse Lane. This was formally opened by County Alderman F. Hunt JP on Wednesday 26 February 1958 at 2.30pm.

Brief Timeline:

- 1950 - Technical Institute opened September 1950 in the old Railway Offices, Station Approach
- 1958 - County Alderman F. Hunt JP formally opens Bishop Auckland Technical College on Woodhouse Lane
- 1962 - New 4 storey block added including Gym and Library
- 1988 - Access to Higher Education for adults
- 1993 - New Corporation (governing body) established to govern the estate and staff of the college
- 1994 - Joanna Tait appointed Principal/Chief Executive
- 2007 - First phase of the brand new Bishop Auckland College opened to students
- 2008 - The Princess Royal officially opens first phase of the new building
- 2010 - Anne Isherwood appointed Principal/Chief Executive.
- 2013 - Natalie Davison-Terranova became Principal and Chief Executive having previously been Vice Principal
- 2014 - The college formed a strategic partnership with South West Durham Training, specialist Engineering training centre located in Newton Aycliffe.
- 2018/19 Launch of Durham Gateway, the college's direct-enrolled specialist alternative provision for 14-16 year olds
- 2019 Launch of the college's first full degree-level programme, in counselling, followed a year later by the sports coaching degree. These courses are the first to be validated through the college's partnership with The Open University.

Since 1958 there have been only five Principals prior to Natalie Davison-Terranova and these were Anne Isherwood, Joanna Tait, Keith Byfield, H.F. Tirrell and H.A. Dickinson.

== Profile ==
The college had approximately 750 full-time students aged 16 to 18 in 2021, with additional numbers made up of part time adults, flexible learning, higher education and apprentices. The usual day starts at 9.15am ending at 5pm (for full-time students). The college is open during the day and on a Monday and Wednesday evening (term time only) for part time classes

The college is part of the Durham Learning Alliance with Durham University, New College Durham, East Durham College and Derwentside College.
