= Bishop Auckland F.C. =

Association football club in England

Bishop Auckland
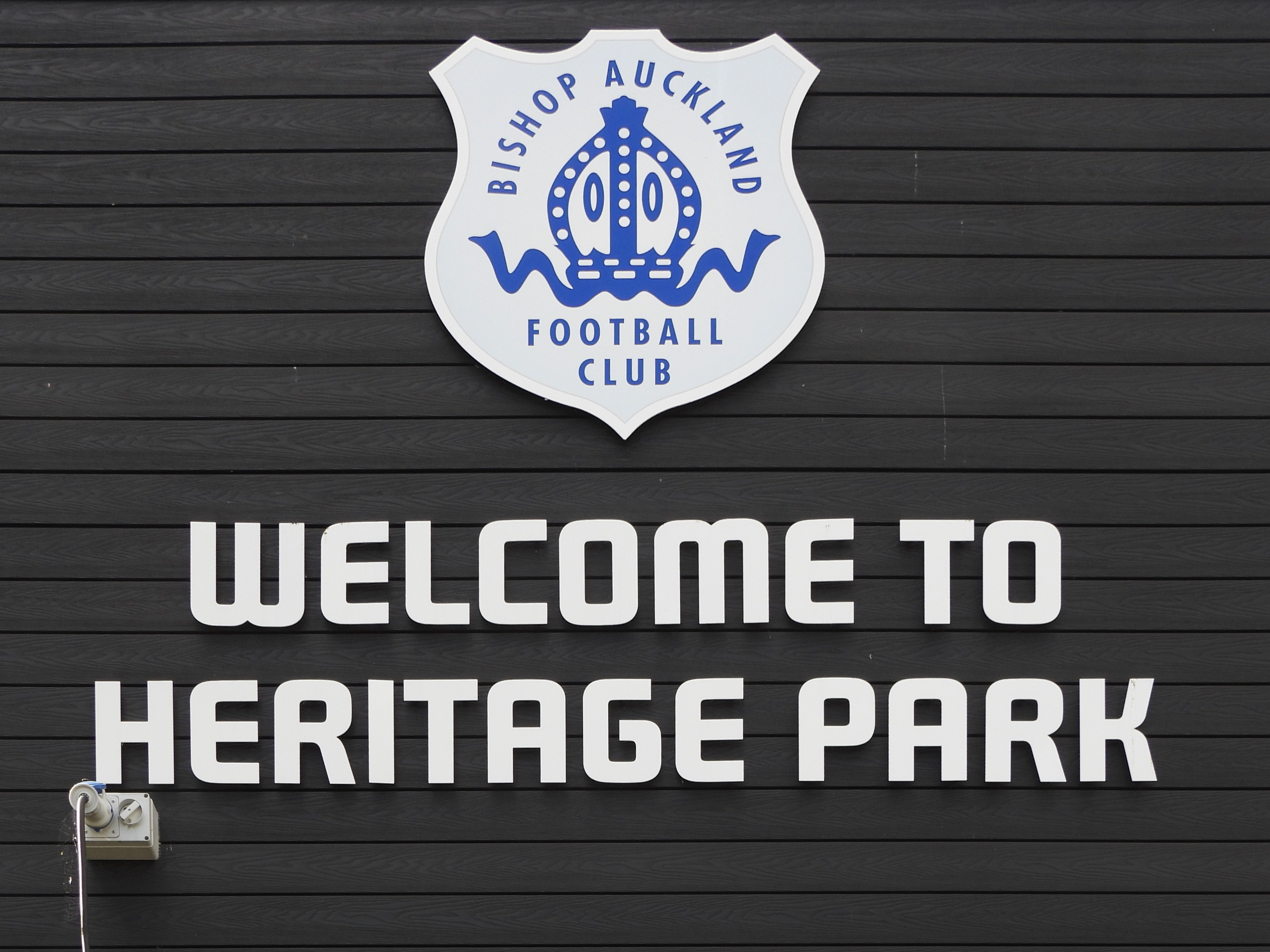
- Full name: Bishop Auckland Football Club
- Nickname: The Two Blues
- Founded: 1886; 140 years ago (as Auckland Town)
- Ground: Heritage Park, Bishop Auckland
- Capacity: 1,950 (500 seated)
- Coordinates: 54°38′17″N 1°41′37″W
- Chairman: Steve Coulthard
- Manager: Martin Gray
- League: Northern League Division One
- 2025–26: Northern Premier League Division One East, 19th of 22 (relegated)
- Website: bishopafc.com
Home colours	Away colours	Third colours

Bishop Auckland Football Club is a football club based in Bishop Auckland, County Durham, England. They are one of the most successful amateur sides, having won the FA Amateur Cup ten times and reached the final on a further eight occasions. Nicknamed 'The Bishops' or 'The Two Blues', they are rivals with West Auckland Town.

The club are currently members of the Northern League Division One and play at Heritage Park.

== History ==
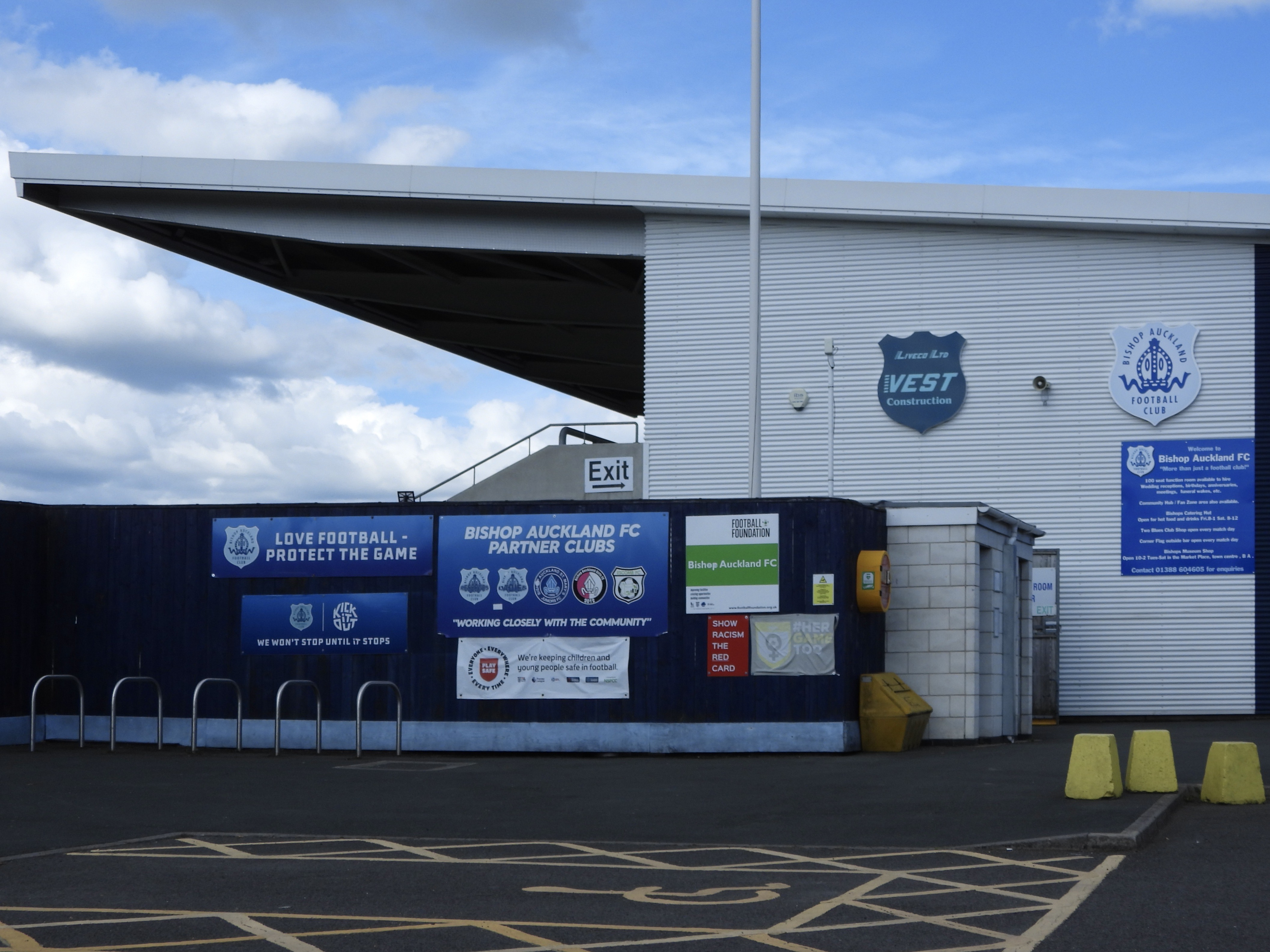
Main Stand, Heritage Park, Bishop Auckland F.C.

=== Formation and early years ===
Football in Bishop Auckland can be traced back to 1882 when theological students from Cambridge and Oxford Universities studying at Auckland Castle, home to the Bishop of Durham in Bishop Auckland, formed a team known as Bishop Auckland Church Institute. The founding students chose Cambridge and Oxford Blue as the club's colours to reflect the origins of the new team. A later dispute caused a breakaway team called Auckland Town in 1886 and it was from this upheaval that Bishop Auckland Football Club was eventually born. Eight days after its formation, the club initially chose royal blue with white facings for the playing kit and subsequently changed to the more familiar light (Cambridge) and dark (Oxford) blue colours of the original Church Institute later, representing the colours of Oxbridge, and the origins of football in Bishop Auckland.

In 1889 Auckland Town were one of the 10 founding members of the World's second-oldest football league – the Northern League. The inaugural season was largely uneventful with the team finishing 8th with the league's first winners being St. Augustine's (Darlington). Between the years of 1891 and 1893 the team never participated in league football but it was during this time that the club won its first silverware – the Durham County Challenge Cup – in 1892.

The team name was changed in 1893 to Bishop Auckland and it was under this name that the football club rejoined the Northern League. The following two seasons under the new name were again uneventful as the club finished third bottom on both occasions.

During the 1895–96 season Bishop Auckland won their first silverware on a national scale – the Amateur Cup – defeating Royal Artillery Portsmouth 8–0 in the final. Over the following few seasons the team steadily improved their league position and in 1898–99 won the Northern League championship for the first time. It was also during 1899 that Bishop Auckland picked up their second Durham County Challenge Cup.

It was clear that Bishop Auckland was an appealing prospect for the region's talented footballers as the Northern League was won a further five times (and shared with Sunderland 'A' in 1905–06) and the Amateur Cup final was reached a further six times (beating Lowestoft Town 5–1 in 1900 and Northern Nomads 1–0 in 1914) before football was suspended due to World War I.

After the war, Bishop Auckland picked up where they left off finishing as league runners-up to South Bank in 1919–20, winning the following season and runners-up again the following two seasons. During this time the Amateur Cup was added twice more with wins over Swindon Victoria (4–2, 1921) and South Bank (5–2 (aet), 1922).

The next honour was won nearly a decade later when the league championship was added in 1931 along the Durham County Challenge Cup. In 1935 the Amateur Cup final was reached again with Wimbledon being defeated 2–1 in a replay after the original tie finished goalless after extra time.

The Bishops had perhaps their best-ever season in 1938–39 when they completed a treble. Future Liverpool player and manager Bob Paisley played at right-back in the team which won the Northern League title, the Durham County Challenge Cup and the FA Amateur Cup. The Amateur Cup final was played in Durham at Roker Park where the Bishops defeated Wellington 3–0 after extra time.

Following World War II Bishop Auckland reached the Amateur Cup final for the eleventh time but went down 3–2 against Barnet. The following season, 1946–47, another Northern League title was added with Crook Colliery Welfare runners-up. The team were runners-up the following two seasons (1948–49), to Ferryhill Athletic and Evenwood Town respectively.

=== Glory days ===
The 1950s were to be Bishop Auckland's best with the Northern League title won in the first three seasons with Billingham Synthonia being the runners-up on each occasion. Bishop and Willington both reached the final of the Amateur Cup in 1950, Willington producing a shock to triumph 4–0 over their more glamorous neighbours and take the Cup back to County Durham. The following season the Amateur Cup final was reached again. The opponents were Pegasus and again Bishops had to settle for a runners-up medal as Pegasus were the victors after a 2–1 win. In '53 Bishop were runners-up to Crook Town in the league but added the title another three times over the next three seasons ('54, '55 and '56), with Crook Town being runners-up on each occasion. In '54 the Amateur Cup final was again reached, this time Crook Town were the opponents and it was the Black and Ambers that triumphed after a narrow 1–0 win.

The next three seasons were unprecedented in Amateur Cup history. Not only did Bishops reach the final on each occasion, but also finished the victors on each occasion. The opponents being; '55 Hendon (2–0), '56 Corinthian-Casuals (1–1 (aet), 4–1) and '57 Wycombe Wanderers (3–1). The latter being Bishops last appearance in the Amateur Cup final. That wasn't the last of the silverware in the 1950s, however. The Durham County Challenge Cup was again added in 1956.

Bishop Auckland FC's best footballing performance was arguably played in the 1954–55 season in which they won the Northern League Division One, the Northern League Cup, the FA Amateur Cup and reached the fourth round in the FA Cup losing only to York City who then went on to lose to the FA cup Winners, Newcastle United in the semi-final. Their path to reach this stage included a historic victory over Second Division Ipswich Town. This victory made Bishop Auckland the first "Northern League side" to defeat a Second Division club and the first to reach the fourth round of the FA Cup.

Bishop Auckland were a successful football team in this era, they have played at Wembley on numerous occasions and attracting large crowds. The 1954–55 FA Amateur Cup final saw the crowd reach 100,000 – the last occasion an amateur match recorded a crowd of that size. The Bishops team of this era contained a number of players that eventually found their way into the professional game. Seamus O'Connell, a forward, went on to play for Chelsea in the 1954–55 season, other players – Derek Lewin, Bob Hardisty and Warren Bradley – went on to play for Manchester United following the Munich air disaster and earned international caps at both amateur and professional level, most notably Warren Bradley who is the only English player to have done this in the same season.

1950s Players included: Harry Sharratt (GK), Dave Marshall (D), Ron Fryer (D), Tommy Stewart (D), Corbett Cresswell (D), John Barnwell (M), Jimmy Nimmins (M), Bob Thursby (M), Tommy Farrer (M), Barrie Wilkinson (M), Bob Hardisty (W), Jack Major (W), Warren Bradley(W), Les Dixon (W), Ray Oliver (F), Derek Lewin (F), Seamus O'Connell (F). Most of the football players earned caps at the amateur international level; some later turned professional, while others, being well-educated, went on to pursue careers in teaching.

In 1960, Bishops were league runners-up to near-neighbours West Auckland Town. The Northern League title was again won in 1967, along with the League Cup and the Durham County Challenge Cup. This was the first time any team had won the 'local treble' and this achievement was added to by an 11 match campaign in the F A Cup that ended in a 7–0 defeat at Halifax Town in a 2nd round replay.

The 1970s were a lean decade for the club in terms of silverware, the league cup being the only competition the club won in the 1975–76 season.

Bishops had to wait until the 1980s until their next piece of silverware – a league and county cup double being added in '85 and '86. After finishing 6th in 1988 it was decided by the club's hierarchy that a higher level of league football was necessary for the club to grow. Bishops left the Northern League for the second time and joined the Northern Premier League. Again, the Durham County Challenge Cup was won this season.

=== Promotion to Premier Division ===
In their debut season in the Northern Premier League the team made their mark in the First Division and finished as runners-up – winning promotion to the Premier Division in the process. The team more than held their own over the following seasons with the club's highest position in the pyramid being achieved in 1997 – 2nd in the Premier League of the Northern Premier League. The county cup was again won this season.

In 2002, the club suffered its first relegation in its history despite not finishing in a relegation place. Bishops were relegated by the Northern Premier League on a ground technicality.

Bishops battled back and again found themselves in the Premier Division following the 2004 restructuring of the non-league pyramid. However, with the ground situation continuing and a percentage of the playing budget being taken up by rent towards Spennymoor United and Shildon, it proved difficult in attracting the quality of player necessary to maintain a place in the Northern Premier League. The following season Bishops suffered their second successive relegation and returned to the Northern League for the 2006–07 season.

=== Return to the Northern League ===
Bishops returned to the Northern League still in a groundsharing agreement with Shildon. This would prove to have an important bearing on the playing budget available to the manager as the club fought to balance the books following relegation. Whilst the manager was confident of a good season, it was clear from early in the season that Bishop were not to be challengers at the top of the table. A solid, if unspectacular, league campaign ended with the Blues finishing 18 points above the drop zone in 16th place.

The following season proved to be even more difficult. With the club having to further reduce the playing budget and as a result performances on the field took a turn for the worse. The season ended with the club in 20th place. Normally, this would have resulted in relegation but with Durham City electing to take promotion to the Northern Premier League, Bishops were spared so the first division of the Northern League could continue with 22 clubs.

Season 2008–09 proved to be better both on and off the pitch and the club entered a groundsharing agreement with West Auckland Town. Whilst the league campaign got off to a disastrous start, the club's plans for a new ground were given the go-ahead in November, but the club were rooted to the bottom of the league. The board decided to take action and a new manager, Colin Myers, was appointed in February. Prior to Colin's first game the Blues were ten points adrift of safety. Over the next twenty games the team gained 26 points to eventually finish the season in 18th place – seven points clear of the relegation zone. A truly remarkable turnaround with only a few additions to the playing squad.

In 2013 the Bishops won the Durham Challenge Cup defeating neighbours and F A Vase holders Spennymoor Town.

The 2023–24 season saw Bishop Auckland promoted from Northern League Division One as champions.

=== Season-by-season record ===
Season	League	Pld	W	D	L	F	A	GD	Pts	Position
2000–01	Northern Premier League Premier Division	44	26	7	11	88	53	35	85	3/23
2001–02	Northern Premier League Premier Division	44	12	8	24	46	68	−22	44	21/23
2002–03	Northern Premier League Division One	42	13	10	19	58	83	−25	49	15/22
2003–04	Northern Premier League Division One	42	14	13	15	61	64	−3	55	13/22
2004–05	Northern Premier League Premier Division	42	11	7	24	51	74	−23	40	19/22
2005–06	Northern Premier League Division One	42	3	6	33	39	99	−60	15	22/22
2006–07	Northern League Division One	42	11	10	21	59	86	−27	43	16/22
2007–08	Northern League Division One	42	12	6	24	55	82	−27	42	20/22
2008–09	Northern League Division One	42	9	11	22	56	85	−29	38	18/22
2009–10	Northern League Division One	42	17	7	18	81	89	−8	58	13/22
2010–11	Northern League Division One	42	15	6	21	75	93	−18	51	14/22
2011–12	Northern League Division One	42	20	9	13	87	69	18	69	8/22
2012–13	Northern League Division One	46	24	7	15	95	77	18	79	6/24
2013–14	Northern League Division One	44	18	14	12	82	54	28	68	8/23
2014–15	Northern League Division One	42	20	2	20	75	75	0	62	11/22
2015–16	Northern League Division One	42	20	7	15	80	79	1	67	8/22
2016–17	Northern League Division One	42	18	10	14	88	67	21	64	8/22
2017–18	Northern League Division One	42	13	4	25	68	112	-44	43	19/22
2018–19	Northern League Division One	34	18	8	8	84	53	31	62	3/18
2019–20 (Note: Due to the coronavirus pandemic, the season was curtailed in March)	Northern League Division One	32	12	5	1	59	6	-7	41	11/20
2020–21 (Note: Due to the government's response to the coronavirus pandemic, matches were unable to take place and the season was officially curtailed in January)	Northern League Division One	12	1	2	9	12	30	-18	5	18/20
2021–22	Northern League Division One	38	9	8	21	42	69	-27	35	18/20
2022–23	Northern League Division One	38	24	6	8	99	48	51	78	3/20

== First team squad ==
As of 31 August 2026

Note: Flags indicate national team as defined under FIFA eligibility rules; some limited exceptions apply. Players may hold more than one non-FIFA nationality.

No.	Pos.	Nation	Player
—	GK	ENG	Shane Bland
—	GK	ENG	Joel Neale
—	GK	ENG	Alex Griffin
—	DF	ENG	Jermaine Metz
—	DF	ENG	Liam Potter
—	DF	ENG	Gary Brown
—	DF	ENG	Arjun Purewal
—	DF	ENG	Ben Jordison
—	DF	ENG	Dane Burlace
—	DF	ENG	Josh Robertson
—	MF	ENG	Will Darke
—	MF	ENG	Arron Thompson (Vice Captain)
—	MF	ENG	Lee Hume

Pos.	Nation	Player	
—	MF	ENG	Vinnie Steels
—	MF	ENG	Harry Norris
—	MF	ENG	John Howard
—	MF	ENG	Bobby Gray
—	MF	ENG	Luke Williams
—	FW	ENG	Mason Hurworth
—	FW	ENG	Craig Moody
—	FW	ENG	Liam Jarvie
—	FW	ENG	Regan Nixon
—	FW	ENG	Gary Martin (captain)
—	FW	ENG	Amar Purewal
—	FW	ENG	Justin Hepper
—	FW	ENG	Leroy Hewitt

=== First Team Backroom Staff ===
Position	Name
Manager	Martin Gray
Assistant Manager	Dean Browne
Head Coach	Steven Johnson
Goalkeeper Coach	Lee Barrass
Assistant Coach	Jack Purdham
Scout	Harry Dunn
Phyiso	Adam Gillies
Kit Manager	Michael Walker
Source: Bishop Auckland FC

== Ground ==
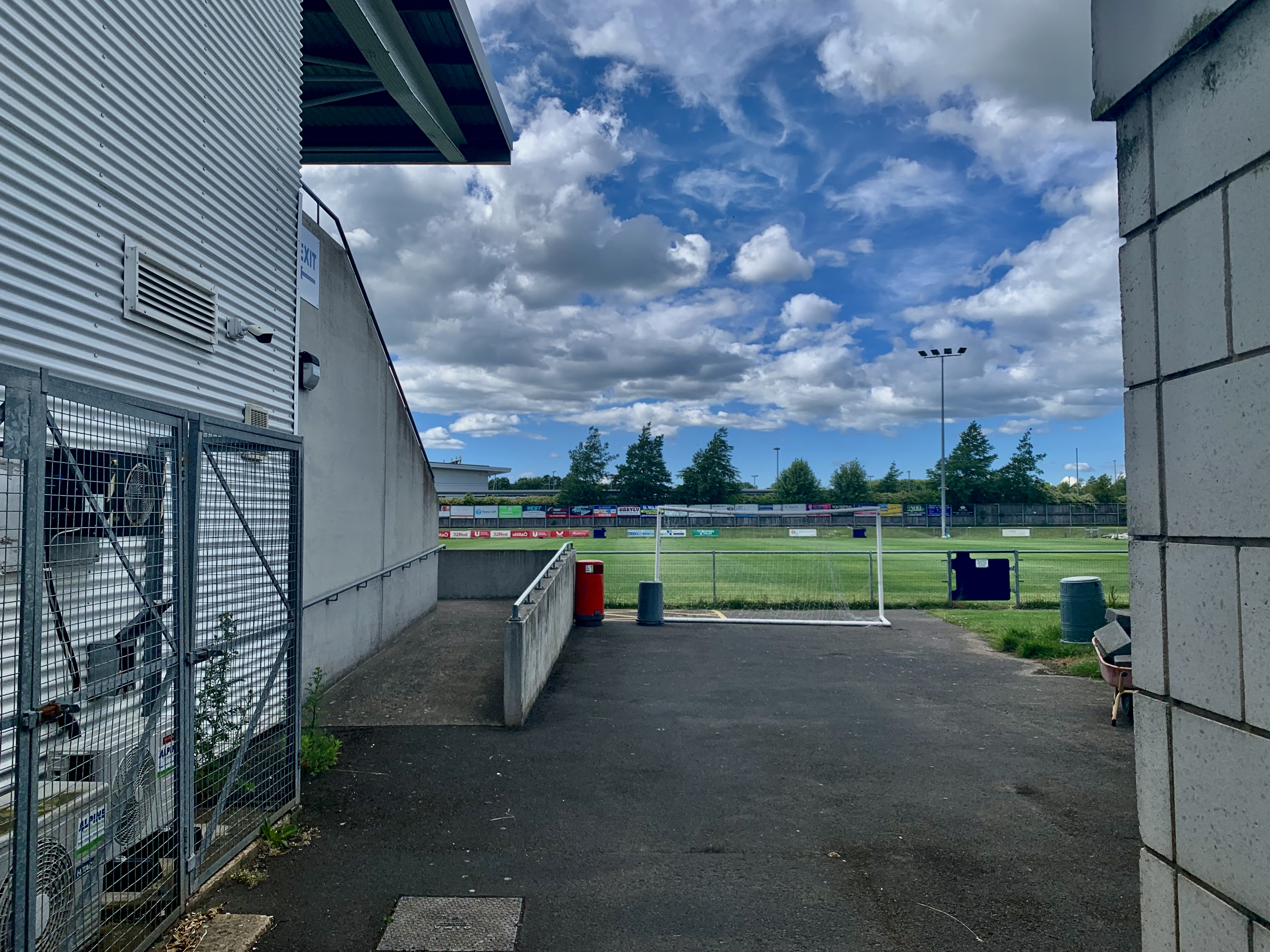
View to the pitch, Heritage Park, Bishop Auckland F.C.

Between the years of 1892 and 2002 Bishop Auckland played their home matches at Kingsway, a ground shared with the town's cricket club. The club moved out of Kingsway with plans to move into a purpose-built stadium at Tindale Crescent out of the town centre, but still in the conurbation of Bishop Auckland. Plans were submitted to Wear Valley District Council in early September 2008, planning permission was granted in mid-November 2008 and the club moved into the 2,004 capacity ground in October 2010. While waiting for the ground to be constructed, the club groundshared at West Auckland Town's Darlington Road for 2008–09, 2009–10 and part of the 2010–11 seasons. They also had stints at Dean Street, home of Shildon, between 2002–04 and 2006–08 and at Brewery Field, Spennymoor, home of Spennymoor Town, between the spells at Shildon.

The current attendance record at Heritage Park is 2,004 for the game between Bishop Auckland and Darlington F.C. in August 2012.

== Honours ==
- FA Amateur Cup
  - Winners: 1895–96, 1899–1900, 1913–14, 1920–21, 1921–22, 1934–35, 1938–39, 1954–55, 1955–56, 1956–57
- Northern League
  - Division One champions: 1898–99, 1900–01, 1901–02, 1908–09, 1909–10, 1911–12, 1920–21, 1930–31, 1938–39, 1946–47, 1949–50, 1950–51, 1951–52, 1953–54, 1954–55, 1955–56, 1966–67, 1984–85, 1985–86, 2023–24
  - League Cup winners: 1949–50, 1950–51, 1952–53, 1953–54, 1954–55, 1959–60, 1966–67, 1975–76
  - Amateur Champions: 1905–06
- Durham Challenge Cup
  - Winners: 1891–92, 1898–99, 1930–31, 1938–39, 1951–52, 1955–56, 1961–62, 1966–67, 1984–85, 1985–86, 1987–88, 1996–97, 1998–99, 2000–01, 2001–02, 2012–13

== Records ==
- Highest league position: 2nd in the Northern Premier League Premier Division, 1996–97
- Best FA Cup performance: Fourth round, 1954–55
- Best FA Amateur Cup performance: Winners, 1895–96, 1899–1900, 1900–01, 1913–14, 1920–21, 1921–22, 1934–35, 1938–39, 1954–55, 1955–56, 1956–57
- Best FA Trophy performance: Quarter-finals, 1978–79, 1996–97, 1999–2000
- Best FA Vase performance: Third round, 2023–24, 2026–27
- Record attendance: 17,000 vs Coventry City, FA Cup second round, 1952
- Most appearances: Bob Hardisty
- Top goal scorer of all time: Andrew Johnson – 249 goals

== See also ==
- Bishop Auckland F.C. players
- Bishop Auckland F.C. managers
