= East Durham College =

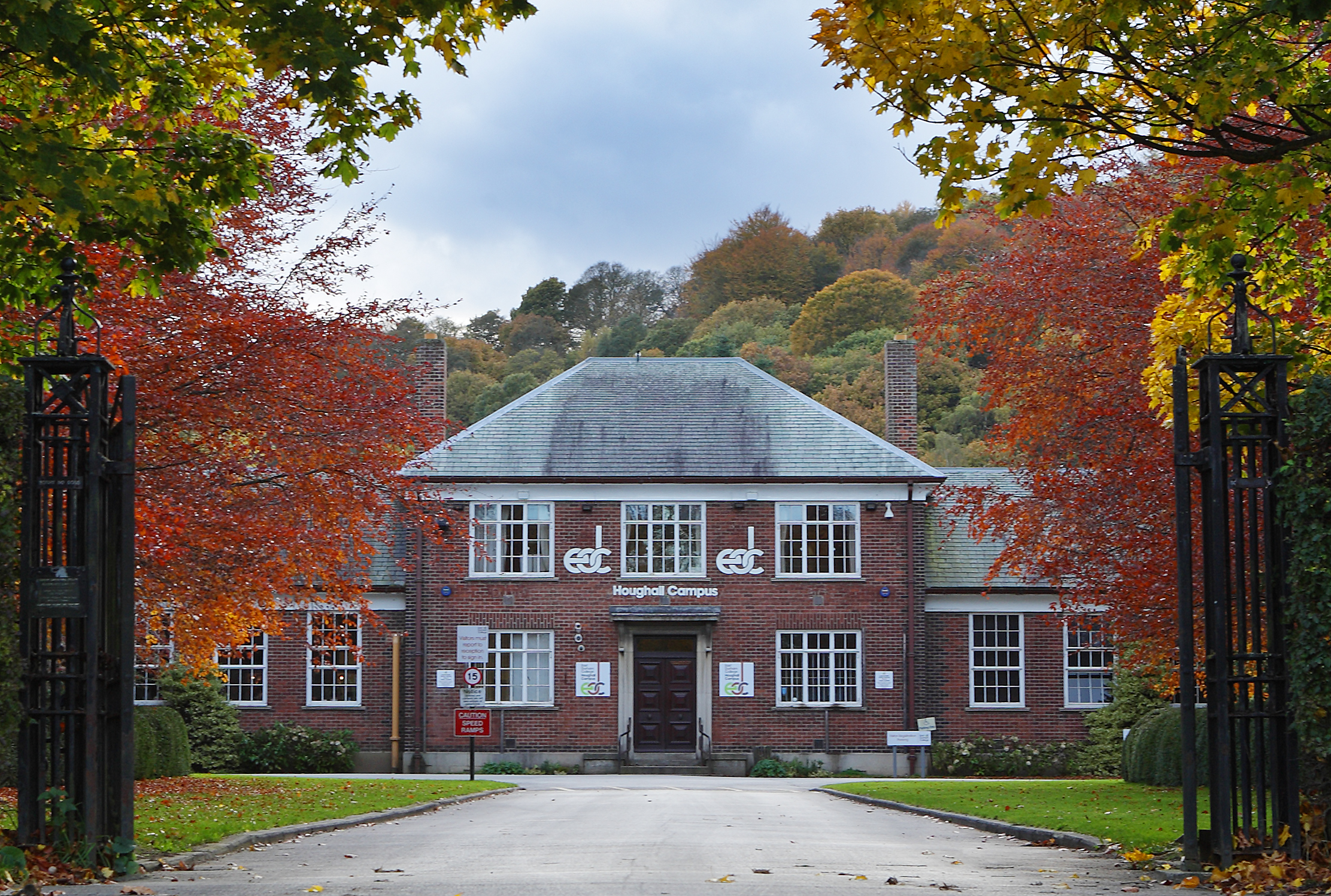
- East Durham College Houghall campus

Location
- Willerby Grove; Peterlee, County Durham, SR8 2RN; England; 54°45′44″N 1°21′00″W

Information
- Established: 1999
- Local authority: North East England LSC (but situated in County Durham)
- Department for Education URN: 131859 Tables
- Ofsted: Reports
- Principal: Scott Bullock
- Gender: Coeducational
- Age: 16+
- Former names: Peterlee Grammar School, East Durham & Houghall Community College
- Website: www.edc.ac.uk

An inside view of the East Durham College Peterlee Campus.

East Durham College, formerly known as East Durham & Houghall Community College, is a community college with campuses in Peterlee and Houghall, south-east of Durham.

It has been rated "Good" by Ofsted for five consecutive inspections in 2008, 2014, 2018, 2021, and 2024. In 2024, Suzanne Duncan, principal and chief executive of East Durham College, announced her retirement after 12 years at the college. Mrs Duncan was succeeded by Scott Bullock, who took over the role of principal and chief executive.

== Locations ==
East Durham College operates across three campuses, as well as providing workforce development within individual workplaces across the region.

The Houghall campus is situated on the A177 (Stockton Road) to the south-east of Durham, near Shincliffe. The 478-acre campus includes extensive arable land, sports pitches, gardens, woodland, stables, an all-weather equine arena, small-animal care unit and working farm.

The Peterlee campus is situated on Willerby Grove off the B1320 (Burnhope Way) in Peterlee, near the A19. Its facilities include a bistro restaurant The Grove, two functional beauty and hair salons, recording studio, IT suites, sports centre and fitness suite, dance studio, theatre and a conference suite.

The college's third site is the Technical Academy located on Peterlee's south west industrial estate.

== History ==
=== Houghall (13th to 20th centuries) ===
The history of Houghall Farm dates back to 1260 when the manor at Houghall, plus attached lands, were granted to the Priory and Convent of Durham. Although some of the land was leased, most of the area was farmed by the monks themselves. Sheep were an important part of the farm at this time; crops such as oats and barley were also grown. The land was very marshy so fish farming took place in the many ponds and the rushes, which grew abundantly, were harvested for use in the cathedral, cloisters and castle.

The Priory let the farm in 1464 to Richard Rackett, and the tenancy remained with the Rackett family until the dissolution of the monasteries. Houghall was then sold to Viscount Lisle, the tenant at that time being Clement Farrowe. The farm was returned to the Church (Dean and Chapter) in 1660.

A survey of the farm was carried out in 1794, and many of the fields had the same shape and the same name as they have today. The crops then grown were oats, barley, wheat, grass, clover and rape.

In 1836 Houghall and other land in the area was endowed to Durham University. In 1920 Durham County Council then bought the farm to provide the site for an agricultural school and training farm.

The course of the River Wear has changed many times over the centuries, both through natural means and by design. A large area, which is now part of the farm, was once the river bed. The silt deposits left by the river have contributed greatly to the fertility of the farm.

=== 1999 to present day ===
The present college results from the merger in June 1999 of Durham College of Agriculture and Horticulture (also known as Houghall College) and East Durham Community College in Peterlee (known as Peterlee Tertiary College in the 1980s and Peterlee College from 1989). The former town centre campus on Burnhope Way was originally Easington Technical College, and the campus at Howletch was originally Peterlee Grammar School.

In 2006, the college was given planning permission to build a new campus at Peterlee because the buildings at the two campuses did not meet requirements for access by disabled people. In September 2008 a new £36m college building was opened on the Howletch site; the old college was demolished to make way for further college buildings; the Burnhope Way building made way for a retail park. The college's new 220-seat theatre was named after Berthold Lubetkin.

In September 2013, the college opened Apollo Studio Academy, a new studio school, on the Peterlee campus. In 2017, it then changed to become an Alternative Provision Free School Free school (England) called the Endeavour Academy.

In 2024, the college became part of the Durham Learning Alliance with Durham University, Bishop Auckland College, New College Durham and Derwentside College.

The college received outline planning permission for a major redevelopment of the Houghall campus in 2025, having been included in the UK government's FE Capital Transformation Fund in 2021. This is planned to include a two-storey teaching and learning block, a new lambing shed, and other improvements to landscaping around the site.

== Sport development centre ==
The college runs a student athlete programme, providing health education to participants. The programme includes boxing, basketball, football and rugby, providing a variety of competitive opportunities (friendly, league, cup fixtures), but the major focus is on individual skill development as opposed to team organisation. The sports hall has 500 seats on the bleachers.

== Notable alumni ==
=== East Durham College ===
- Steve Harper, footballer – studied sport and attended the college's football development centre; now academy goalkeeping coach for Newcastle United F.C.
- Steve Howey, footballer – worked at the college's football development centre from 2007, and was acting head of the centre until 2011
- Michael Proctor, footballer - had a spell as first team coach for the college football team. He is currently a first team coach at Premier League Sunderland.
- Tony Jeffries, boxer – studied engineering at the college and was part of the boxing development team
- Gina McKee, actress – best known for her roles in The Lost Prince and Notting Hill
- Shaun Reay, footballer
- Dave Wilson, Bath and England rugby union prop

=== Peterlee Grammar School ===
- Grahame Morris, Labour MP since 2010 for Easington

=== Easington Technical College ===
- John Cummings, Labour MP from 1987 to 2010 for Easington
