= New College Durham =

College in Durham, UK

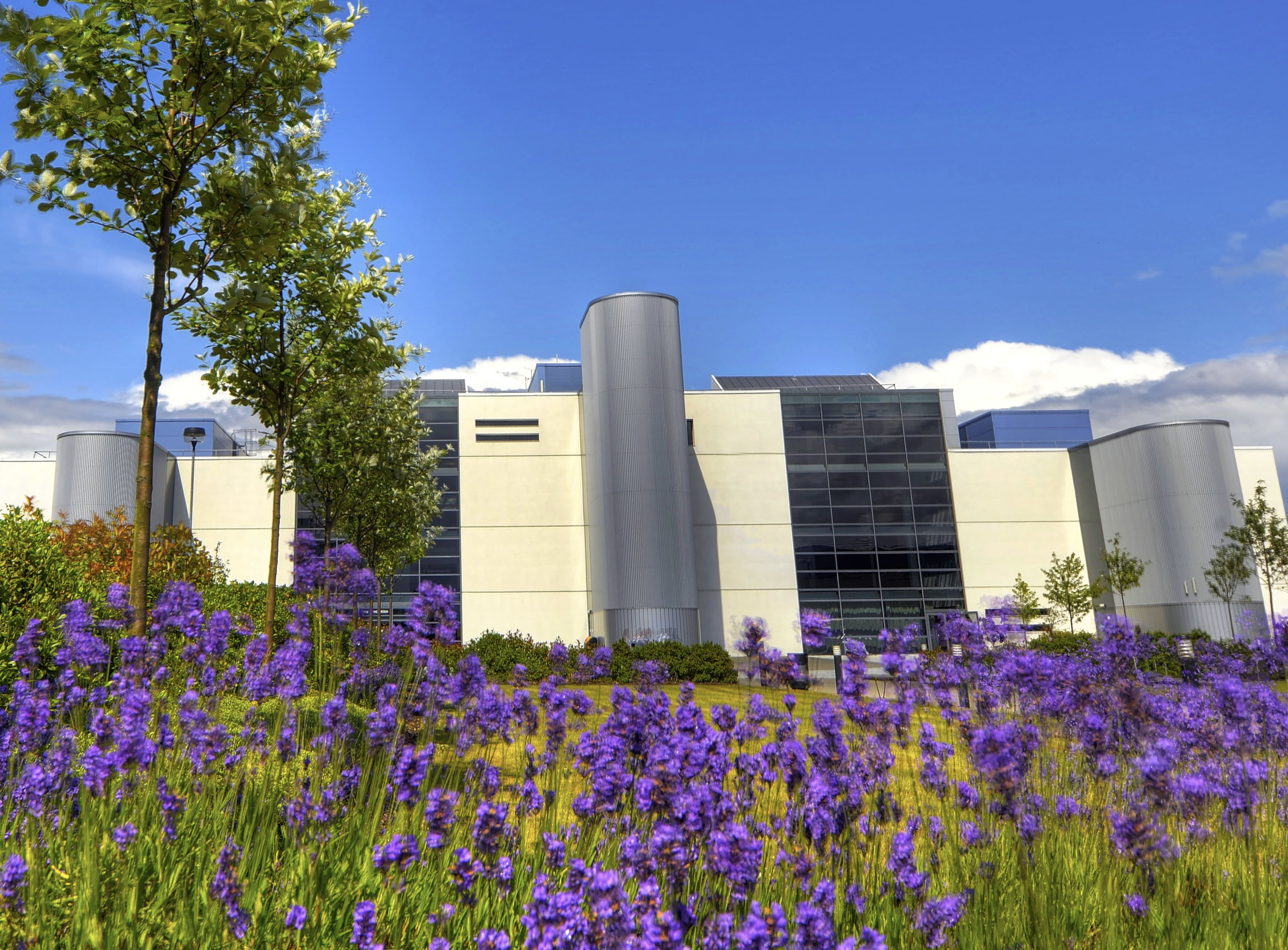
- Type: Education
- Established: 1977
- Location: Framwellgate Moor, Durham, England; 54.796°N 1.595°W
- Website: newcollegedurham.ac.uk
- Location within County Durham Location within England Location within the United Kingdom

New College Durham is a further and higher education college and a sixth form college in County Durham, England. It was founded in 1977 as a result of a merger between Neville's Cross College of Education and Durham Technical College. It holds foundation degree awarding powers.

== History ==
New College Durham was formed by the merger of Neville's Cross College in Neville's Cross and Durham Technical College in Framwellgate Moor in 1977.

Neville's Cross College was a teacher training college established in 1921 by Durham County Council. It initially only admitted women but became mixed in 1963. It was a licensed hall of residence at Durham University from 1924 until the merger in 1977. It was designated a college of education in 1969. Following the merger, teacher training degrees continued to be offered until 1986. Durham Technical College opened in 1957 and was originally focused on supporting the mining industry, with courses in engineering and construction.

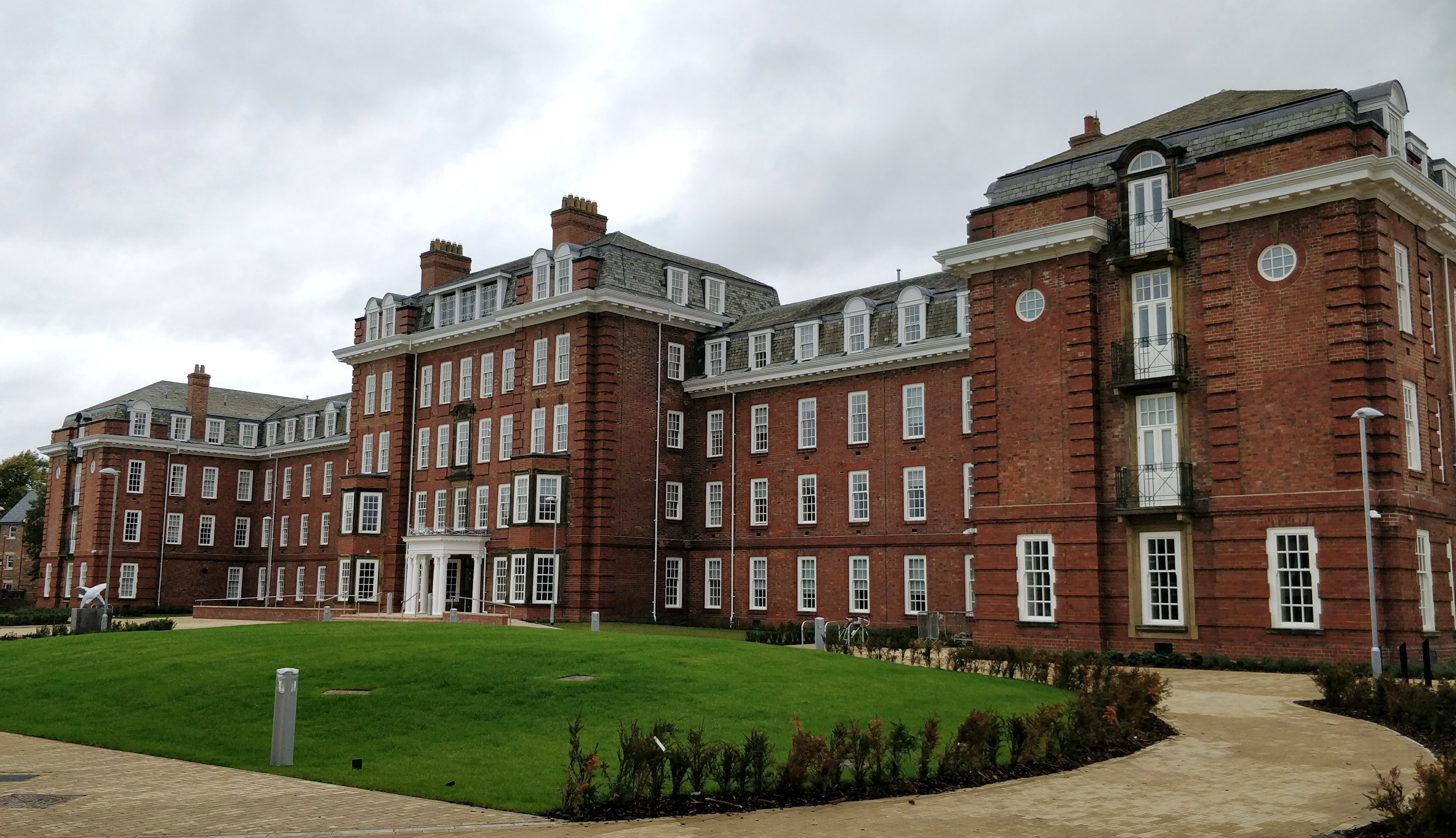
The main building of the former Neville's Cross College, which served as part of New College Durham until 2004.

Until 2004, the college operated on two main sites near the city of Durham: the Neville's Cross College site in Neville's Cross and the Durham Technical College site in Framwellgate Moor. The site at Framwellgate Moor housed the bulk of the college's further education provision (FE), whilst the Neville's Cross site housed most of the higher education (HE) provision. With both sites in need of updating, the board of governors decided to develop the college on a single campus in Framwellgate Moor. In 2002, the college was given planning permission to build a new £37 million campus, which opened at the start of the 2005 academic year. The Neville's Cross site was sold for redevelopment, eventually becoming the home of Durham University's Ustinov College in 2018.

In the academic year 1999–2000, the college enrolled 8,270 FE students, of whom 1,877 were full-time, and 1,934 HE students, of whom 675 were full-time. Business and management was offered on the Neville's Cross Campus until 2004. In 2011, the College became one of only two in the country to be granted Foundation Degree Awarding Powers. These can be converted to bachelor's degrees via a "top up" year, with the degrees validated by Teesside University, Sunderland University and Leeds Metropolitan University.

In 2020, New College Durham became the anchor FE partner for the North East Institute of Technology, one of the first twelve institutes of technology established by the UK government, in partnership with other local FE providers, Newcastle University as the HE anchor, and Nissan and Esh Group as the employment partners. In 2024, the college became part of the Durham Learning Alliance with Durham University, Bishop Auckland College, East Durham College and Derwentside College.

== Notable alumni ==
- David Anderson, Labour Member of Parliament for Blaydon (2005–2017), Shadow Secretary of State for Northern Ireland and Shadow Secretary of State for Scotland (2016–2017) (Durham Technical College)
- Pat Barker, novelist and writer. (Neville's Cross College)
- Paul Connor, professional footballer
- John Cummings, Labour Member of Parliament for Easington (1987–2010) (Durham Technical College)
- Stephen Hughes, Labour Member of the European Parliament for Durham and then North East England (1984–2014)
- Ian Lavery Labour Member of Parliament for Wansbeck and Chairman of the Labour Party

== New Logo ==
New College Durham adopted a new refined logo which resembled the old one. The new logo was uploaded to their social media (Instagram and Facebook) on 21/10/2020 9:00. The logo was voted for on an online survey which was sent to students and staff in the college.
