= Derwentside College =

Location
- Front Street; Consett, County Durham, DH8 5EE; England; 54.8501°N 1.8359°W

Information
- Type: Further education
- Established: 1986
- Principal: Susan Errington
- Website: http://www.derwentside.ac.uk/

Derwentside College is a further education college based in Consett, County Durham, England. It is the major provider of vocational post-16 education and training in the former district of Derwentside.

The Acting Principal and Chief Executive is Susan Errington, who took over from Chris Todd in 2026.

The college's inspection report in 1997 summarised its history as: "Derwentside College was established as a tertiary college in 1986 following the decision of Durham Local Education Authority (LEA) to bring together the activities of Consett Technical College and the sixth forms of five local schools".

The college is part of the Durham Learning Alliance with Durham University, New College Durham, East Durham College and Bishop Auckland College.
