= Derek Lewin =

English footballer (1930–2019)

Derek Lewin (18 May 1930 – 15 March 2019) was an English amateur international footballer. He spent most of his playing career with Bishop Auckland F.C. scoring for them in each of their FA Amateur Cup finals at Wembley in 1955, 1956 and 1957. He also won five English amateur international caps, and represented Great Britain in the 1956 Melbourne Olympic Games.

== Biography ==
In 1953, his talent attracted the Oldham Athletic player-manager George Hardwick who persuaded him to sign amateur forms. Although he found little time to train with his professional colleagues because of pressure of work in his family's business, his natural ability served the club well. He scored the only goal on his debut at Lincoln City in September, when the club recorded a rare win in what proved to be a very disappointing 1953–54 season, and went on to make a further eight Second Division appearances. After his career with Bishop Auckland, he made one Football League appearance for Accrington Stanley.

In 1958, following the crash at Munich Airport involving Manchester United, Lewin brought Bob Hardisty and Warren Bradley to Old Trafford to assist the club through the problems of meeting its fixtures. In 1970, Lewin became a director of Blackpool FC.

He joined the Lancashire Football Association in 1972 as a council member. He was a vice-president from 1985 to 1995 and president from 1995 to 2004 when he was made a life past-president. In 1991, he was elected to represent Lancashire County on the Council of the Football Association and he served in this national body until 2006. He remained actively involved in Lancashire FA and was a member of the board of directors. He lived with his wife Sheila in Chorley.
