= Tindale Crescent =

Village in County Durham, England

Coordinates: 54.6415°N 1.6913°W

Map showing the location of Tindale Crescent in County Durham

Tindale Crescent is a place in County Durham, in England. It is situated immediately to the south-west of Bishop Auckland.

== History ==
In March 1982, Police Detective Constable James Porter was shot in the Tindale Crescent area. A ceremony and memorial plaque to honour him in Tindale Crescent took place in 2022.

== Buildings ==
There is a retail park with a hotel and restaurant.
