= St John's Catholic School =

St John's School & Sixth Form College, A Catholic Academy

Location
- Woodhouse Lane; Bishop Auckland, County Durham, DL14 6JT; England; 54.65°N 1.6915°W

Information
- Type: Academy
- Motto: "A Learning Community Guided by Gospel Values"
- Religious affiliation: Roman Catholic
- Established: 1964
- Department for Education URN: 137702 Tables
- Ofsted: Reports
- Head teacher: L Byron
- Gender: Coeducational
- Age: 11 to 18
- Enrolment: 1372
- Houses: Aidan, Bede, Cuthbert and Wilfrid
- Website: http://www.stjohnsrc.org.uk/

St John's Catholic School & Sixth Form College is a Coeducational Roman Catholic secondary school and sixth form with academy status. It is located on Woodhouse Lane in the town of Bishop Auckland, County Durham, England.

St John's Catholic School opened in 1964 and currently has 1372 pupils enrolled between the ages of 11 and 18 (of which 305 are aged 16–18).

School facilities include a swimming pool, sports hall, gymnasium and an Astroturf football pitch, all of which are used by the school and outside community groups.

St John's has a variety of after school clubs including a swimming club and chess club.

== Notable people ==
- Sara Davies, entrepreneur, Dragon's Den
- Jamie Campbell, star of the BBC Three documentary Jamie:Drag Queen at 16 who attended his end of school prom in Drag. The story was later adapted as the West End musical, Everybody's Talking About Jamie.
