= Jack Dormand =

British politician (1919–2003)

The Right Honourable The Lord Dormand of Easington

Chair of the Parliamentary Labour Party
- In office October 1981 – 12 June 1987
- Preceded by: Fred Willey
- Succeeded by: Stan Orme

Member of the House of Lords
- Lord Temporal
- Life peerage 13 October 1987 – 18 December 2003

Member of Parliament for Easington
- In office 18 June 1970 – 18 May 1987
- Preceded by: Manny Shinwell
- Succeeded by: John Cummings

Personal details
- Born: 27 August 1919 Haswell, County Durham, England
- Died: 18 December 2003 (aged 84) Peterborough, Cambridgeshire, England
- Party: Labour

John Donkin Dormand, Baron Dormand of Easington (27 August 1919 – 18 December 2003) was a British educationist and Labour Party politician from the coal mining area of Easington in County Durham, in the north-east of England. He was Member of Parliament (MP) for the Easington constituency from 1970 until his retirement in 1987.

Described as an "old-style centre-right socialist", Dormand was a working-class child who progressed through grammar school education to study at Durham, Oxford and Harvard and on to a career as an educational administrator before entering Parliament at the age of 50, where he was noted as an advocate for education and for mining areas. He never achieved ministerial office, but as a skilled administrator he played a significant role as a government whip in the 1970s, and as Chair of the Parliamentary Labour Party when the party was in opposition in the 1980s. An atheist and a staunch republican, he reluctantly accepted a life peerage when he retired from the House of Commons and was an active working peer until his death 16 years later.

== Early life ==
Dormand was born near Easington in 1919 at the workingmen's club in the village of Haswell, where his father Bernard, a former miner, was steward. He was educated locally at Wellfield Grammar School in nearby Wingate as one of the first pupils after the school opened in 1930. Although he later took up rugby, he was a skilled footballer in his youth, good enough to have professional trials with both Manchester United and Charlton Athletic. Sport remained a major part of his life; until his death he remained a member of Houghton-le-Spring Rugby Club and of Burnmoor Cricket Club, last playing both games at the age of 63.

After training as a teacher at Bede College, Durham University, from 1940 to 1948 Dormand taught at Hordern Modern School and his old school, now renamed Wellfield A. J. Dawson Grammar School. He was not called up for military service during World War II, because teaching was a reserved occupation. After the war he improved his qualifications by taking a Postgraduate Certificate in Education (PGCE) at Loughborough College in 1947. In the 1950s he studied at St Peter's College, Oxford, where he was awarded a diploma in public and social administration with distinction, and won a Fulbright Scholarship to Harvard in his second year (1954), becoming a friend of the future Senator Ted Kennedy.

Following his spell in teaching, Dormand became an education advisor to Durham County Council, and in 1957 moved to be advisor to the National Coal Board. He stayed with the NCB for only two years before returning to Durham to be Further Education organiser; from 1963 to 1970 he was Director of Education for Easington Rural District Council. He was also the President of the Easington branch of the National Union of Teachers.

== Political career ==
Dormand had been a member of the Labour Party since the age of 18. He was elected to Haswell parish council at the age of 26, and at 30 to Easington rural district council.

Manny Shinwell, the then 85-year-old veteran Labour Member of Parliament (MP) for the Easington constituency, announced in 1969 that he would not contest the next general election. Dormand, who had been secretary of the Easington Constituency Labour Party throughout the 1960s and Shinwell's presumed successor, was selected as the new Labour candidate to contest the ultra-safe seat (Shinwell had been re-elected in 1966 with over 80% of the votes). At the 1970 general election in which Harold Wilson's Labour government was defeated, Dormand was returned to the House of Commons with a barely reduced 79.8% share of the vote.

=== Education ===
His maiden speech on 8 July 1970 focused on education and on the needs of Durham as an "excepted district", and in particular on those classed as "slow learners". It was well received, and the then Secretary of State for Education Margaret Thatcher was seen to be making notes. Dormand's views on education were supportive of comprehensive education, and in July 1973 he urged the abolition of private schools (attacking particularly those Labour MPs who sent their children to be educated privately).

Dormand opposed Britain's membership of the European Economic Community (EEC), and at the time of the referendum on EEC membership in 1975 he was an advocate for the United Kingdom leaving the EEC and rejoining the European Free Trade Association. His main work in opposition was as a member of select committee on nationalised industries, where his knowledge and inquisitorial skills won him the respect of the committee's left-wing chair Ian Mikardo. In February 1972 he called for employment for miners who had been made redundant, and became Secretary of the Parliamentary Labour Party's Northern Group in 1973.

=== Republicanism ===
Dormand later described himself as "a republican for as long as I can remember having an interest in politics" and was a long-serving secretary of the all-party Parliamentary republican group. He spoke out in opposition to the monarchy, declaring in 1971 that "the whole of the royal establishment from the Queen downwards could go, lock stock and barrel tomorrow". He extended his criticism to the hereditary peerage in February 1973. In 1974 he and fellow Labour MP Willie Hamilton took the required oath declaring their allegiance to the Queen, then admitted that they had not meant it. The same year, he criticised the number of Royal servants who appeared on the biannual honours lists, calling instead for "scores of miners" to be honoured as they were just as worthy.

== Government whip ==
Labour was returned to government at the February 1974 general election, and Dormand was appointed as an assistant government whip under Bob Mellish. He was promoted to be a Lord of the Treasury (full Government whip) in a reshuffle after the October election.

The post of a Whip normally required silence in the chamber of the House of Commons, but in February 1976 Dormand was involved in a difficult situation which required him to give an explanation. The Conservative opposition had called a vote censuring the Secretary of State for Industry Eric Varley by reducing his salary to £1,000. Dormand was appointed as one of the tellers to count the vote, but both he and his Conservative opposite number miscounted and lost the true count. When Mellish announced the confusion to the Speaker, the Speaker agreed to hold another vote. Embarrassingly for Dormand, many Labour MPs had not stayed to hear the result and were no longer present, resulting in the Conservatives winning the vote by a majority of five. The Government decided that the result was not a true indication of the House's opinion and overturned the vote a few days later.

When James Callaghan succeeded Wilson as Prime Minister in 1976, Mellish resigned and was replaced by Michael Cocks, and Dormand was promoted within the Whip's office to be the pairing whip, a job which involved co-ordinating agreed absences by MPs from one party with those of another so that the outcome of parliamentary votes is not affected. The Home Secretary Merlyn Rees had urged Callaghan to appoint Dormand as Chief Whip rather than Michael Cocks.

The role of the pairing whip remained a crucial one as the government's slim majority turned to a minority through defeats at by-elections, and Dormand was credited with a central role in helping the government stay in office, telling Wilson that he was too "bloody knackered at the end of the day" to record the events surrounding the late-night votes. In January 1978 Dormand was named in a report by the Serjeant-at-Arms as having assisted in blocking one of the Division lobbies in an attempt to prevent a vote on part of the Government's legislation to devolve power to Scotland.

On free votes he did not always help the Government. In July 1977, Dormand voted against the European Assembly Elections Bill which brought in direct elections to the European Parliament.

== In opposition ==
When Labour lost the 1979 general election, Dormand served for two years as an opposition whip. He was an active opposition frontbencher who was particularly vocal in criticising the effects of the Thatcher government's economic policy on the manufacturing industry of the Northern region: in June 1980 he said that the policies were "crucifying" the region and it was "becoming a scene of devastation". He specifically called on Chancellor of the Exchequer Sir Geoffrey Howe to abandon monetarism.

=== Parliamentary Labour Party chair ===
In the 1970s, Dormand had opposed left-wing infiltration into the Labour Party, and in foreign affairs, he was pro-American and pro-NATO at a time when the party's left-wing was becoming increasingly hostile to both. In October 1981, Dormand stood for the vacant position of Chairman of the Parliamentary Labour Party, supported by the centre-Right Manifesto Group of Labour MPs. The strength of the left-wing in the Constituency Labour Parties at the time had spurred the Manifesto group to improve its organisation, and Dormand (nominated by former Prime Minister James Callaghan) defeated the main challenger, left-wing MP Ian Mikardo by 102 votes to 65, and Mikardo then withdrew. The other three candidates were Harry Ewing (22 votes), Willie Hamilton (11 votes) and Frank Hooley (11 votes) but all withdrew so no second ballot was held. Dormand held the chairmanship until he retired from the House of Commons in 1987.

Dormand had a difficult job in trying to unite a fractious Parliamentary party at a time when the Labour Party was growing unpopular. In November 1982, amidst rumours that a majority of Labour MPs wanted to replace party leader Michael Foot, Dormand gave a radio interview insisting that "I have absolutely no doubt whatever that the vast majority think that Michael Foot is the man for the job at the moment, and will take us into the next general election". In response, Foot's critics noted Dormand's use of the words "at the moment".

=== Kingmaker for the Speaker ===
After the 1983 general election, Dormand played a key role in the accession to the Speakership of Bernard Weatherill, seconding his nomination for the post. Weatherill had been an opposition whip when Dormand had been working in the Government whip's office in the late 1970s, but had not been appointed to the Thatcher government; in supporting him, Dormand pointed out to Labour cheers that Weatherill "is his own man" and would "ensure that the rights of backbenchers were safeguarded". In July 1983 he worked with his Conservative opposite number Edward du Cann (Chairman of the 1922 Committee) to agree an increase in MPs' pay over that which the Government proposed.

Like most Labour MPs, Dormand opposed the decision of National Union of Mineworkers president Arthur Scargill to call a national strike in 1984 to 1985, but he supported the miners in the Durham coalfield when his local Easington Colliery and others joined the strike. He accused the Prime Minister Margaret Thatcher of washing her hands of the dispute like "Pontius Pilate".

Despite his age, he remained physically active. In the 1970s he had campaigned successfully for the establishment of a parliamentary gym, continued playing cricket and rugby until the age of 63, and cycled from the House of Commons to his flat near Millbank. The then Leader of the House of Commons, John Biffen, recounted how Dormand would "swathe himself in luminous strips" before setting off, and although he abandoned the bicycle in 1987, deterred by London's heavy traffic, he took up walking instead.

=== House of Lords ===
Labour leader Neil Kinnock was expected to ask him to be government chief whip if Labour won the 1987 general election, but Dormand thought it right to retire at the age of 67. His successor John Cummings was the first miner to become MP for the area.

A staunch republican who deplored all forms of social privilege, including hereditary peerages, he accepted Kinnock's offer of a seat in the House of Lords with some reluctance, receiving a life peerage as Baron Dormand of Easington, of Easington in the County of Durham on 13 October 1987.

However, once in the Lords he thrived, serving on numerous select committees, including education, trade and industry, and the liaison and procedure committees. He was also appointed as deputy chairman of the Teesside Development Corporation, whose 12,000 acres (49 km^{2}) of de-industrialised land included part of his former constituency. The corporation was later condemned by Labour MP Ashok Kumar for having left a legacy of limited and "often inappropriate and threadbare development".

His areas of expertise included the film industry and tourism, continuing the work he had begun in the Commons as chair of the all-party parliamentary tourism committee in seeking the promotion of tourism in previously overlooked parts of the United Kingdom. He was also a member of the select committee on committee structure of the House of Lords and its chairman at the end of 1991, and later became Labour Peer's Representative on the Shadow Cabinet.

Dormand had been brought up a Christian, an allegiance which continued into adulthood, when he sat on the parochial church council. He described his adoption of atheism as the result of "some years of very considerable thought", and once freed from the fear of offending religious constituents, his atheism became more outspoken in the Lords; in July 2000 he called for the disestablishment of the Church of England. He helped form the All Party Humanist Group, and became vice-president of the British Humanist Association. As a former teacher, he sought parity in schools for religions and humanism, seeking to have both described neutrally rather than propagated. After his death, Michael Turnbull, the former Bishop of Durham, wrote in The Times of how Dormand had pursued this and other causes "without prejudice" and with "a warm affection for others".

He continued to live in Easington after leaving the Commons, but moved in 1991 to Clipsham, Rutland, to be closer to the House of Lords. He described the move as "traumatic", but remained active in the Lords until his death, pursuing his interests in education and continuing his opposition to the monarchy. Of some 20 Labour peers opposed to the monarchy, Dormand was the most outspoken, asking the government in November 2001 "whether they will call a referendum on the abolition of the monarchy" (the Lord Chancellor's answer was "No, my Lords"), and asked in March 2003 for a Select Committee to consider the future of the Monarchy.

He recovered from a double heart bypass in 2001, and received an honorary doctorate of letters in July 2003 from Loughborough University. His last contribution to the House of Lords debates was on 19 November 2003, when he criticised the situation of "having to borrow money from the state to undertake a degree course" as "a considerable deterrent to poorer families". The following week he was awarded an Honorary Doctorate of Laws by the University of Sunderland, taking the opportunity to repeat his criticism of funding for students by saying "it is very important that young people should not be prevented from going to university".

That was Dormand's last visit to his native North-East. He went into hospital in Peterborough four days later, and died on 18 December 2003, aged 84. Tony Blair described him as "a life-long servant of the Labour Party"; When asked by a journalist to choose his own epitaph, the answer had been "he was a canny lad." A care home in Peterlee is named after him.

== Family ==
In 1963, Dormand married Doris Robinson (née Pearson), a former teacher who survived him. He had one stepson, and one stepdaughter from Doris's previous marriage.

Parliament of the United Kingdom
Preceded by Manny Shinwell	Member of Parliament for Easington; 1970 – 1987	Succeeded by John Cummings
Political offices
Preceded by Fred Willey	Chair of the Parliamentary Labour Party; 1981–1987	Succeeded by Stan Orme
