= Thornley, County Durham =

Thornley, County Durham may refer to:

- Thornley, Durham, near Durham
- Thornley, Weardale, in Weardale
