= John Cummings (politician) =

British politician (1943–2017)

- Cummings as an MP

Member of Parliament for Easington
- In office 11 June 1987 – 12 April 2010
- Preceded by: Jack Dormand
- Succeeded by: Grahame Morris

Personal details
- Born: John Scott Cummings; 6 July 1943 Newcastle upon Tyne, England
- Died: 4 January 2017 (aged 73) Durham, England
- Party: Labour

John Scott Cummings (6 July 1943 – 4 January 2017) was a British Labour politician who served as Member of Parliament (MP) for Easington from 1987 until 2010.

== Early life ==
Cummings was born in Newcastle upon Tyne, a fifth-generation coal miner. He was educated at the Murton Council Infant and Junior schools on Watt Street and Secondary school. He attended both the Easington Technical College and the Durham Technical College until 1962. He began his career with the National Coal Board as a miner in 1958, working as a pit electrician from 1967 until his election to the House of Commons twenty years later. He was elected as a councillor to the Easington District Council in 1970, was its chairman from 1975 to 1976, and was its leader from 1979 until he stepped down in 1987. Active on picket lines during the 1984–85 miners' strike, in which Easington was the location of several clashes with the police, Cummings later claimed his Jack Russell Terrier Grit had been trained to "nip at policemen's ankles".

He was a member of the Northumbrian Water Authority and the Peterlee and Newton Aycliffe Development Corporation. A trade unionist with the National Union of Mineworkers, he was a trustee for the union from 1986 to 2000.

== Parliamentary career ==
Cummings was first elected to the House of Commons at the 1987 General Election as the Labour MP for Easington following the retirement of Jack Dormand. His majority was 24,639. Entering the Commons at the same time as another former miner from the North-East, Ronnie Campbell, the two men were described by journalist Andrew Roth as "rough diamonds, set to shine".

In parliament, he became a member of the Environment Select committee from 1990 until he was promoted to become an Opposition Whip by Tony Blair in 1995. However, he was sacked after the 1997 General Election and did not serve in government. He again joined the environment select committee (in its various guises of Environment, Transport and the Regions and Transport, Local Government and the Regions). He was a member of the Speaker's Panel of Chairmen from 2000 and served on the select committee of the Office of the Deputy Prime Minister from 2002.

On 9 October 2006, Cummings announced his intention to stand down at the next general election. In September 2007, the Easington Constituency Labour Party (CLP) selected local councillor and CLP secretary Grahame Morris as their candidate for the 2010 election.

== Personal life ==
Unmarried and Roman Catholic, he died from lung cancer in January 2017 in Durham at the age of 73.

Parliament of the United Kingdom
Preceded by Jack Dormand	Member of Parliament for Easington; 1987–2010	Succeeded by Grahame Morris
