= Easington Colliery =

Village in County Durham, England

Coordinates: 54.78681°N 1.32912°W

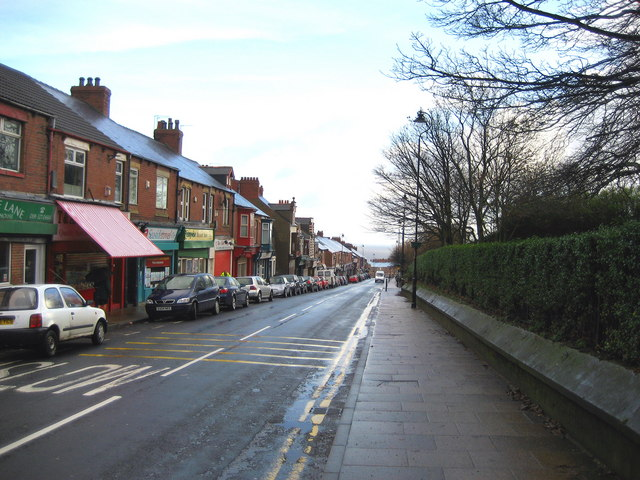
- Seaside Lane, looking east

- Location within County Durham
- Population: 4,734
- OS grid reference: NZ432437
- Civil parish: Easington Colliery
- Unitary authority: County Durham
- Ceremonial county: County Durham
- Region: North East
- Country: England
- Sovereign state: United Kingdom
- Post town: Peterlee
- Postcode district: SR8
- Dialling code: 0191
- Police: Durham
- Fire: County Durham and Darlington
- Ambulance: North East
- UK Parliament: Easington

Easington Colliery is a village in County Durham, England, known for a history of coal mining. It is situated to the north of Horden, a short distance to the east of Easington. It had a population of 4,959 in 2001, and 5,022 at the 2011 Census.

The village's prominence increased after its use as the fictional Everington in the film Billy Elliot (2000), starring Jamie Bell.

== History ==
Easington Colliery began when the pit was sunk in 1899, near the coast; indeed the pylon for the aerial flight that carried tubs of colliery waste from the mine stood just inside the North Sea. Thousands of workers came to the area from all parts of Britain, and with the new community came new shops, pubs, clubs, and many rows of terraced "colliery houses" for the mine workers and their families. On 7 May 1993, the mine was closed, with the loss of 1,400 jobs, causing a decline in the local economy. The pit shaft headgear was demolished the following year.

The village's former infant and junior schools were built in 1911. They are adjacent to Seaside Line but lie derelict. A development company bought the buildings in 2003 and applied for planning permission to build 39 residential units, but a public inquiry gave a ruling that protected the buildings from demolition. They have since been demolished.

A history of the Easington Colliery was published in the Journal of the North East Labour History Society.

== Victoria Cross ==
The youngest soldier to be awarded a Victoria Cross during World War II was Dennis Donnini, who was from Easington. His father, an Italian named Alfred Donnini, had married an Englishwoman named Catherine Brown and ran an ice-cream shop in Easington. Donnini attended Corby Grammar School in Sunderland.

While in the line of duty on 18 January 1945, fusilier Donnini (then aged 19) was wounded twice yet still led an assault on the enemy before being killed. His gallantry had enabled his comrades to overcome three times their own number of the enemy. He is buried at the Commonwealth Cemetery in Sittard, the Netherlands.

== 1951 colliery explosion ==
There was a major mine disaster in 1951, sometimes called the Duckbill or Duck Bills Flare (or Fire).

Although the shafts for the colliery had started to be sunk in 1899, the first coals were not drawn until 1910 due to passing through water-bearing strata. Two main pits were sunk: the North Shaft (downcast) (Note: A downcast shaft is one where air passes down the shaft. At this date ventilation was by induced (sucked through) rather than forced (blown through). The downcast pit was therefore used for the conveyance of men and materials.) and the South Shaft (upcast). (Note: The upcast pit carries air up. Early practice was to use a furnace below ground to induce a draft throughout the mine.) Both of these reached down to the Hutton seam, at 1,430 feet (440 m) and 1,500 feet (460 m), respectively. The seams worked were Five Quarter, Seven Quarter, Main Coal, Low Main and the Hutton at the bottom. Underground, the colliery was split into a number of distinct areas or districts. The explosion occurred in the West or "Duckbill" district (named after the duckbill excavators used in the district (Note: Duckbill loaders or excavators were used to load loose coal onto a conveyor belt. They were not the actual coal cutter.)), which lies to the northwest of the shafts and to the north of the village. The village is built over the seams, and to safeguard it from subsidence there is a reserved area under it.

Significantly, one district extends for four miles (6.4 km) under the North Sea; ventilation was, therefore, not simple: enough air was needed to ventilate the extremities of the eastern workings, whilst that for the closer faces did not need such a powerful supply. Too much air in the closer workings would starve the distant ones. Supplementary fans and traps needed to be employed. The Duckbill district was being developed, and it appears that the effect of this on the ventilation was overlooked, as admitted by the Assistant Agent (Mr H. E. Morgan) in cross-examination.

=== The colliery in 1951 ===
From the pit bottoms, the main roadways extended 380 yards (350 m) to the north, where the West Level branched off and ran for 640 yards (590 m) west to the junction with the Straight North Headings, which head north via drifts into the Five Quarter seam. The West Level continued into a training area. Around 300 yards (270 m) along the Straight North Headings was a further junction where the First West Roads headed west. Some distance further on the second and third roads branched off.

Along the First West roads were a number of headings both north and south. The seat of the explosion was at the far end, down the Third South heading.

At the end of the Third South heading a cross passage was driven and "long wall" excavation commenced on the retreating wall principle. The cutting machine travels from one end of the long wall to the other, and then back. The cuts are made towards the roads, thus the face retreats from where it started back towards the start of the headings. Behind the cut is a void (known as "goaf") into which spoil was placed and normally the roof is allowed to collapse upon this spoil as props are withdrawn. In the case of the Third South workings this collapse did not occur properly and a void developed above the spoil.

=== Firedamp and coal dust ===
The area above the goaf was inadequately ventilated and acted as a reservoir for firedamp. The origin of the firedamp is debatable: either the fractured roof allowed a sudden outburst from the seams above, or else the firedamp was gradually emitted from the waste into the void. Roberts discusses these possibilities in the report and comes down in favour of the latter.

All collieries are susceptible to the build up of coal dust, not just at the face but along the roadways and conveyors. Coal dust when dispersed in air forms an explosive mixture. Mines therefore adopt three principal means of combating this risk: removal of the dust, spraying with water and diluting the coal dust with stone dust. All three were practised at Easington, but not in a satisfactory manner.

=== Firedamp detection ===
At this date firedamp detection was by means of a flame safety lamp. Certain men were required to have the lamps with them. (Note: Coal Mines General Regulation (Firedamp Detectors), 1933) These men were not permitted to have electrical lamps with them which might disguise the changes in the flame they were meant to observe. Provision was made for the mine manager to issue written permission for these men to carry electrical lights. At Easington this permission was routinely given. Since the flame lamps were not needed for illumination they were an additional item to carry and were sometimes left behind. On the day of the explosion both lamps had been left at the intake and were not being used for detection. Roberts was unsure whether, in this instance, the lamps would have provided timely warning of the firedamp.

=== Coal cutter ===
The coal cutter has a rotating head on which are mounted hardened teeth, known as picks. Within the coal can be found inclusions of rocks such as pyrites or quartz which shatter and produce a finely divided powder. If this powder is between the pick and the rock it will be ground and thereby heated. Blunt picks are more likely to do this than sharp ones. Prior to the explosion sparking had been observed from the cutters in the Duckbill district.

=== Explosion ===
At Easington in 1951 blunt picks from the coal cutter hit a patch of pyrites and generated sparks. The firedamp leaking from the void above the goaf was ignited. When firedamp explodes in a tunnel it generates a blast of gas which raises any coal dust lying around. The coal dust, being finely divided, in turn explodes and the resulting explosion propagates along the tunnel as a flame front. At Easington the explosion travelled down the south headings to the west roads and then along the west roads, down the straight north headings and into the main coal where it reached as far as the training area. Two falls occurred: one in the main coal shortly before the drifts leading to the straight north roads, the other in the Duckbill district shortly before the 3rd south heading.

=== Men ===
At that time Durham mines worked three production shifts and a maintenance shift. The fore-shift was from 03:30 to 11:07, the back-shift from 09:45 to 17:22 and night-shift from 16:00 to 23:37. The maintenance and repair shift was the stone-shift from 22:00 to 05:37. Shift timings related to going underground through to returning to the shaft top, therefore at 04:35 both the stone-shift and the fore-shift were underground at the faces. 38 men from the stone-shift and 43 from the fore-shift were killed, all but one instantly. The man who survived died of his injuries just a few hours later. As a result of the total loss of life in the vicinity there were no eye-witness accounts of the explosion or its immediate aftermath. (Note: The Roberts report consistently uses the terms inbye and outbye. Inbye means towards the coal faces and away from the pit bottom, outbye is the reverse)

=== Rescue attempts ===
One man (Frank Leadbitter) was at the shaft-bottom stables and led a party of men through the dust cloud towards the explosion. They headed along the main coal west haulage road towards the duckbill district. The Chief Inspector of Mines singled Leadbitter out for especial praise for continuing even after feeling what they thought was a second explosion.

The air in the pit was foul with afterdamp. As the rescuers started to move into the affected area, the canaries carried were overcome almost at once. The afterdamp led to the deaths of a further two men, bringing the total deaths to 83. The first death was John Young Wallace (26) who simply sat down, fell unconscious and died. His self-contained breathing apparatus was tested and found to be satisfactory. A post mortem examination revealed emphysema and it was thought that the exertion led to breathlessness caused him to open his mouth and allow ambient air to leak in. The air was thought to contain about 3% carbon monoxide (30,000 ppm), well above the 667 ppm fatal concentration.

Three days later another rescuer collapsed in a similar way and died. The postmortem revealed bullous emphysema. A bulla (blister) on his left lung had ruptured and the pain had made him gasp for breath, thereby inhaling a fatal amount of carbon monoxide.

=== Memorial ===
A memorial comprising a large carved triangular rock painted white. It bears a tablet of stone removed from the scene of the disaster, and a metal plaque with an inscription. The memorial was inaugurated on 22 March 1952. On the same occasion, Easington Colliery's youngest miner, a boy of 16, planted the first of 83 trees, to line the walkway. Each tree symbolises a life lost in the disaster.

The youngest victim was 18-years-old, the oldest 68, whilst the average age of the pitmen killed was 43.

== Community ==
=== Brass band ===
Easington Colliery Band was founded in 1915. Players with band experience were encouraged by the management to come from the West of Durham to work at the colliery and play in the band. The band was supported financially and run by the joint board of unions, until the start of World War II. The band played for community activities, such as dances, concerts, and competitions. For the duration of the war the Easington Colliery Youth Band became the National Fire Service Band, which was eventually 'demobbed' in 1945 to become the Easington Public Band.

In 1956 the Public Band and the Colliery Band amalgamated to become the Easington Colliery Band as it is today. April 1993 witnessed the end of an era when Easington Colliery finally closed. The band is now self-supporting and relies on funding from concerts held throughout the year. The band is still based in Easington Colliery in the old colliery pay office opposite the Memorial Gardens, which is on the site of the old colliery. The building is the last remaining evidence of the pit.

== In popular culture ==
=== Billy Elliot ===
Easington Colliery doubled as the fictitious Everington in the 2000 film Billy Elliot. About 400 locals were used as extras during the filming in 1999.

Due to Easington Colliery's pit closure in 1993, the film's mining scenes were filmed at the Ellington and Lynemouth Colliery in Northumberland, with some filming in Dawdon, Middlesbrough and Newcastle upon Tyne.

Scenes inside the Elliot home and local street shots were filmed in Easington Colliery. Alnwick Street, on which the Elliot family lived at number 5, was one of several streets demolished in 2003 after becoming derelict. Michael lived at the corresponding number across the alley to the west on the also-demolished Andrew Street. A green space now stands in their place. Avon Street, to the east, which is still intact, is shown when the postman walks up to the front of the Elliot residence to deliver Billy's letter from the Royal Ballet. The faded white-brick wall of Wright's Prize Bingo, on Ashton Street, is also still visible. This was directly in line with the Elliots' terrace.

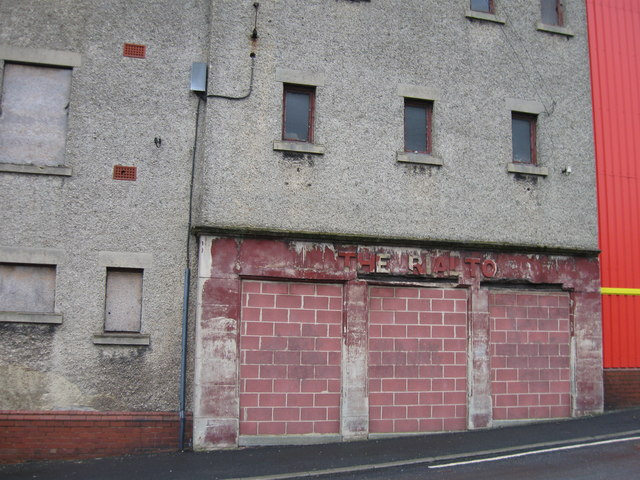
The former Rialto cinema on Oswald Terrace, pictured in 2010

Almost all of the scenes set in Everington were filmed at the top of the sizable slope that is visible in the street views, near the allotments on Tower Street that still remain today. Easington coal mine was located past the eastern end of Tower Street. It is also down Tower Street that Billy is seen dancing with his ballet shoes around his neck. He then turns right to go behind the Anthony Street terraces, looking down the hill to Ashton Street, on what is now Gardener and Leech Courts, with Bede Street rising up on the other side. The rear of Anthony Street, where Austin and Arthur Streets once stood, is also used in the scene in which Billy steals a ballet book from the mobile library van. After a dance class, Mrs Wilkinson drops Billy off at a vacant lot of land on Crawlaw Avenue, just beyond Andrew Street.

There are three scenes filmed at the southern end of the terraces: when Debbie is dragging the stick along the walls (and police shields) on Ashton Street at the ends of Avon Street, firstly, and then Alnwick Street. Billy then crosses Ashton Street en route to Seaside Lane. The same crossing is made by Billy, Jackie and Tony when they take Billy to the bus station. Mrs Wilkinson parks on Ashton Street, at the bottom of Alnwick Street, when she pays the Elliots a visit.

The Rialto, a former cinema on Oswald Terrace, is shown briefly in the movie. It is now the only surviving cinema building in the town, although it has now been taken over by a carpet superstore. Part of the original façade, which Billy walks by, is still visible, however. It ceased being a cinema in the mid-1970s. It is in the alley behind Oswald Terrace that the Christmas scene featuring Billy and Michael is shot. Fake snow is used to cover the scene. The rear of the Rialto doubles as that of Everington Boys' Club, where Billy attends boxing and dance practices. The interior shots were filmed on the top floor of Hanwell Community Centre in London.

Billy Elliot the Musical (2005) is set in Easington and the village is named in song lyrics.

=== Other ===
Singer-songwriter Jez Lowe was born and brought up in Easington. His song, "Last of the Widows", was written in 1991 to mark the fortieth anniversary of the pit disaster. Many of his other songs are inspired by life in County Durham and Easington in particular.

Poet, Songwriter and Durham miner Jock Purdon penned and sang the lament "Easington Explosion" regarding the 1951 disaster.

In 1971, members of rock band The Who shot the cover photograph for their album Who's Next at a concrete piling protruding from a spoil tip in the area. This cover was named by the VH1 network as one of the Greatest Album Covers.

In 2008, the town was featured in an episode of Channel 4's The Secret Millionaire, in which advertising mogul Carl Hopkins donated over £30,000 to the community.

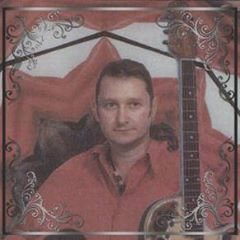
Singer-songwriter Peter Lee Hammond

Peter Lee Hammond was a miner at Easington pit and a singer-songwriter. Every year, Easington held a carnival, and in 1989 Hammond was asked by the Easington Carnival Committee to write and sing a song about the community, mining history and the pit disaster of 1951. The A-side song was called "Living in a Mining Town", which included Hammond singing with his band Just Us, and the B-side was an instrumental version of the song and included Thornley & Wheatley Hill Colliery Brass Bands and local school children from Easington Junior school & Shotton Primary school singing harmony. The B-side was conducted and brass arrangement by Gorden Kitto. Local renowned poet and Colliery resident Mary Bell also helped organise the single's release. The song became a big hit with the locals and it was decided to make it into a single, with the proceeds going to a handicapped school in Easington. As the newspapers and radio got involved then quite a few celebrities gave their support and got involved in giving donations and funding the song, including HRH Prince Charles, the then Prime Minister Margaret Thatcher, Neil Kinnock M.P. and Sir Paul McCartney, and the song was mixed at Abbey Road Studios. Hammond was quoted as saying in a radio interview:

"Having one of my songs done at Abbey Road Studios was great. What a fantastic place it is, and Paul and Lynda helping was a dream. And to have the local school kids and brass bands on the B-side shows how strong the mining community is in this area and it gave the community a sense of pride when the single came out, I was very proud and honoured to have been asked to do this for the place where I was born and raised."

A copy of the song was requested by Queen Elizabeth II to be sent to her at Buckingham Palace, and a copy of the song was made part of the living history memorabilia exhibition at the Yardy Gallery museum in Sunderland, Tyne and Wear. The song was played on many radio stations and was a major success in the area. Hammond went on to win many awards for his other songs and recording albums abroad and is still writing to this day.

== Schools and education ==
- Easington Colliery Primary School
- Easington Church of England Primary School
- Easington Academy

== Gallery ==
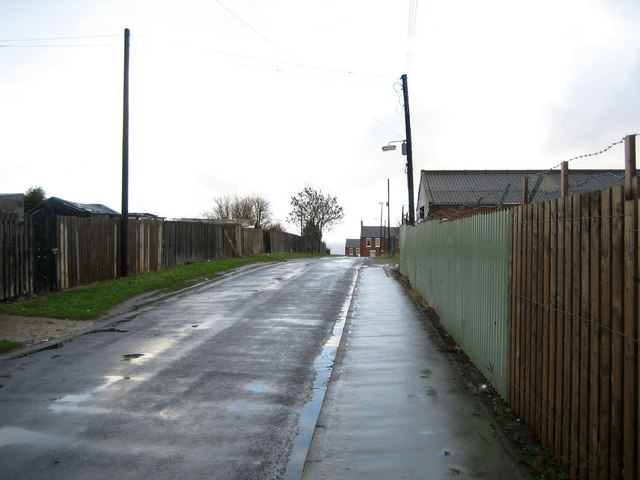
Tower Street, which was one of the streets featured in Billy Elliot

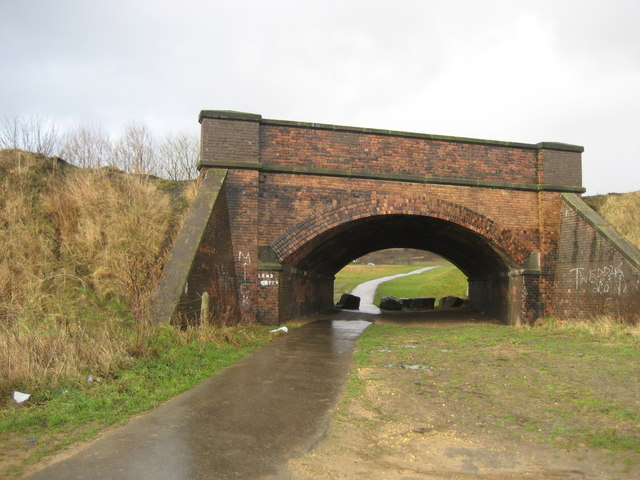
Bridge under the Durham Coastal Railway

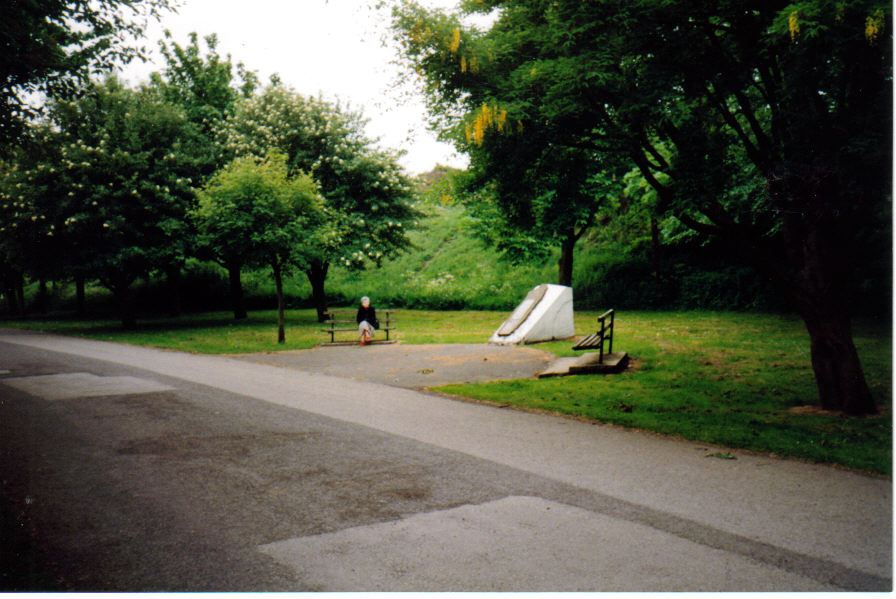
Memorial Avenue, where, following the mining disaster in 1951, 83 trees were planted, one for each man who was killed.
