= Jack Youll =

British recipient of the Victoria Cross

John Scott Youll
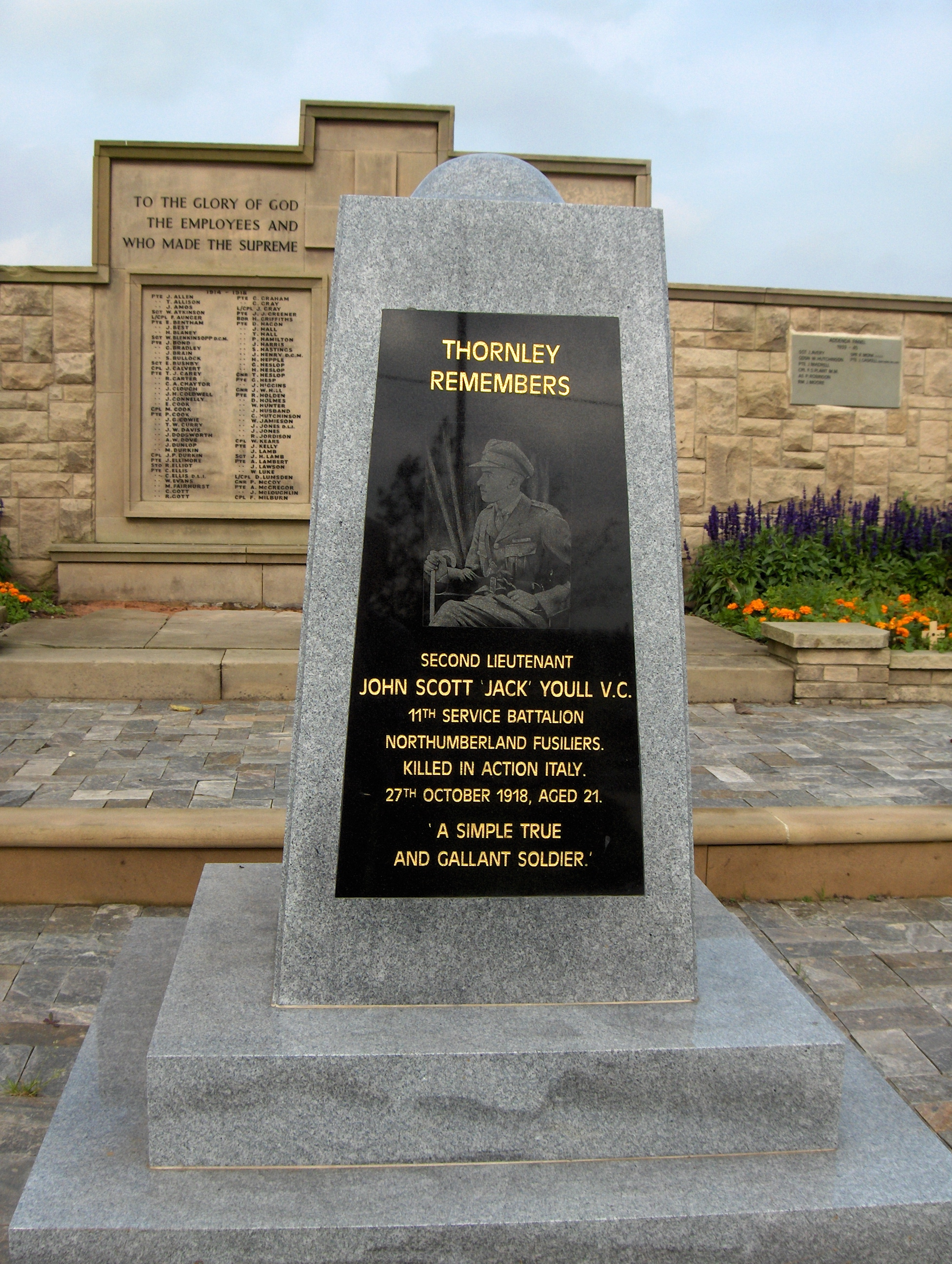
- The John Scott Youll VC Memorial in Thornley, County Durham
- Born: 6 June 1897; Thornley, Durham, County Durham, England
- Died: 27 October 1918 (aged 21); Vittorio Veneto, Italy
- Burial place: Giavera British Cemetery, Veneto
- Military career
- Allegiance: United Kingdom
- Branch: British Army
- Service years: 1915–1918
- Rank: Second Lieutenant
- Nickname: "Jack"
- Units: Royal Engineers; Northumberland Fusiliers
- Conflicts: World War I
- Awards: Victoria Cross; Silver Medal of Military Valor

Second Lieutenant John Scott Youll VC (6 June 1897 – 27 October 1918) was a British Army officer and an English recipient of the Victoria Cross (VC), the highest and most prestigious award for gallantry in the face of the enemy that can be awarded to British and Commonwealth forces.

== Details ==
John Scott Youll was born in Thornley, Durham, County Durham, on 6 June 1897, the son of Richard William Youll and Margaret Youll, who lived at "Thorncroft". His initial education was at Thornley Council School before becoming a technical student at a class held by the Durham County Council at Wingate. At the age of about fifteen he began to work for Thornley Colliery as an apprentice electrician.

The First World War began in the summer of 1914 but it was not until July 1915 before Youll entered military service, joining the Royal Engineers of the British Army and serving with the 1st Durham Engineers. After remaining in England for another year he was sent to the Western Front in August 1916. He was soon recommended for training to become an officer and returned to England in February 1917 to commence his training. In June he was gazetted as a temporary second lieutenant into the Northumberland Fusiliers (later the Royal Northumberland Fusiliers), before returning to the Western Front in late July.

He was 21 years old, and a temporary second lieutenant in the 1st Battalion, The Northumberland Fusiliers, British Army, attached to 11th (Service) Battalion during the First World War when the following deed took place at the battle of Asiago for which he was awarded the VC.

On 15 June 1918 south west of Asiago, Italy, Second Lieutenant Youll was commanding a patrol which came under heavy enemy fire. Sending his men back to safety he remained to watch the situation and then, unable to rejoin his company, he reported to a neighbouring unit where he took command of a party of men from different units, holding his position against enemy attack until a machine-gun opened fire behind him. He rushed and captured the gun, killing most of the team and opened fire, inflicting heavy casualties. He then carried out three separate counterattacks, driving the enemy back each time.

He was killed in action during the battle of Vittorio Veneto, Italy, on 27 October 1918.

== Further information ==
He was also the holder of the Italian Silver Medal of Military Valor. He is buried at Giavera British Cemetery, Treviso province.

In 2005, his home village of Thornley unveiled a memorial in his honour. The four faces of the memorial briefly detail his life, Army career and his Victoria Cross citation.

== Bibliography ==
- Ashcroft, Michael (2007) [2006]. Victoria Cross Heroes. London: Headline Review. ISBN 978-0-7553-1633-5.
- Gliddon, Gerald (2005). The Sideshows. VCs of the First World War. Sutton Publishing. ISBN 978-0-7509-2084-1.
- Whitworth, Alan (2015). VCs of the North: Cumbria, Durham & Northumberland. Pen and Sword Books. ISBN 978-1473848221.
