= Easington (constituency) =

Parliamentary constituency in the United Kingdom, 1950 onwards

Coordinates: 54.790°N 1.352°W

- County constituency for the House of Commons
- Interactive map of boundaries since 2024
- Location within North East England
- County: County Durham
- Electorate: 70,043 (March 2020)
- Major settlements: Seaham, Peterlee, Easington, Murton

Current constituency
- Created: 1950
- Member of Parliament: Grahame Morris (Labour)
- Seats: One
- Created from: Seaham

Easington is a constituency (Note: A county constituency (for the purposes of election expenses and type of returning officer)), created in 1950, represented in the House of Commons of the UK Parliament since 2010 by Grahame Morris of the Labour Party. (Note: As with all constituencies, the constituency elects one Member of Parliament (MP) by the first past the post system of election at least every five years.)

== Constituency profile ==
The Easington constituency is located in County Durham on the North Sea coast. The largest towns in the constituency are Peterlee and Seaham, both of which have populations of around 20,000. The constituency covers many former coal mining villages, including Murton, Horden, Easington Colliery, Shotton Colliery and Blackhall Colliery. Like many former coal mining areas, the constituency experienced economic decline during the late 20th century as the industry was phased out, and high levels of deprivation are now present. The average house price is close to one-third of the national average.

Residents of the constituency have low levels of income, education and professional employment compared to national averages. White people made up 98% of the population at the 2021 census. At the local council, most of the constituency is represented by Reform UK, although Blackhall Colliery elected Labour Party councillors. Voters in the constituency strongly supported leaving the European Union in the 2016 referendum; an estimated 64% voted in favour of Brexit compared to 52% nationwide.

== Boundaries and boundary changes ==
=== Historic ===
==== 1950–1974 ====
- The Rural District of Easington.

Created by the Representation of the People Act 1948 for the 1950 general election from the abolished Seaham constituency, but excluding the Urban District of Seaham Harbour, which was included in Houghton-le-Spring.

==== 1974–1983 ====
- The Rural District of Stockton; and
- in the Rural District of Easington the parishes of Castle Eden, Easington, Haswell, Hawthorn, Horden, Hutton Henry, Monk Hesleden, Nesbitt, Peterlee, Sheraton with Hulam, Shotton, Thornley, and Wingate.

Gained the Rural District of Stockton from the abolished constituency of Sedgefield. Northern-most parts, including Murton, transferred to Houghton-le-Spring.

==== 1983–2010 ====
- The District of Easington wards of Acre Rigg, Blackhalls, Dawdon, Dene House, Deneside, Easington Colliery, Easington Village, Eden Hill, Haswell, High Colliery, Horden North, Horden South, Howletch, Murton East, Murton West, Park, Passfield, Seaham, Shotton, South, and South Hetton.

Seaham and Murton returned from the abolished constituency of Houghton-le-Spring. Area comprising the former Rural District of Stockton had been included in the new county of Cleveland, and its contents now distributed between Hartlepool, Stockton North and Stockton South. Southern parts of the District of Easington included in the re-established constituency of Sedgefield.

==== 2010–2024 ====
Map of boundaries 2010–2024

- The District of Easington wards of Acre Rigg, Blackhalls, Dawdon, Dene House, Deneside, Easington Colliery, Easington Village and South Hetton, Eden Hill, Haswell and Shotton, Horden North, Horden South, Howletch, Hutton Henry, Murton East, Murton West, Passfield, Seaham Harbour, and Seaham North.

Following their review of parliamentary representation in County Durham for the 2010 general election, the Boundary Commission for England made only minor changes to the boundaries of Easington (on the southern part of the boundary with Sedgefield).

In the 2009 structural changes to local government in England, the local authority districts in Durham were abolished and replaced with a single unitary authority; however, this did not affect the boundaries of the constituency.

=== Current ===
Further to the 2023 review of Westminster constituencies, which came into effect for the 2024 general election, the constituency was defined as composing the following electoral divisions of County Durham (as they existed on 1 December 2020):

- Blackhalls, Dawdon, Deneside, Easington, Horden, Murton, Passfield, Peterlee East, Peterlee West, Seaham, Shotton and South Hetton, Trimdon and Thornley (part), and Wingate.

The constituency was expanded to bring the electorate within the permitted range, by adding the communities of Thornley and Wingate from the abolished constituency of Sedgefield.

Further to a local government boundary review which came into effect in May 2025, the constituency now comprises the following electoral divisions of County Durham:

- Blackhalls and Hesledens; Castle Eden and Passfield; Dalton and Dawdon; Easington and Shotton (most); Horden and Dene House; Murton; Peterlee; Seaham; Thornley and Wheatley Hill; Trimdon and Wingate (part - including Wingate).

== Political history ==
Results of the winning party

The area has been held by the Labour Party since the 1935 election (including predecessor seat). Labour's majority in the seat has never fallen below 19% (the result in the party's 2019 landslide defeat - and in the party's 2024 landslide victory) in its history, and has only been below 40% four times (in 1979, 1983, 2019 and 2024). Labour won a majority of votes in every election from the seat's creation in 1950 until 2019, when their vote share fell below 50% for the first time.

Results of other parties

The 2015 general election saw an above-average swing to UKIP of 18.7%; the national average was 9.5% . Prior to 2019, the Conservative Party had last come second in the seat in 2001. Labour's candidate won more than three times that of UKIP in 2015, scoring 61%, although the latter polled the strongest second-place in the seat since 1983. 2017 saw the UKIP vote collapse and the Conservative vote rise, although a slight rise in the Labour vote ensured the majority remained above 40%. In 2019, the newly formed Brexit Party (later renamed Reform UK) won 19.5% of the vote, their sixth best result in the election, contributing to a dramatic collapse in Labour's vote share and majority. The 2024 election saw Labour's vote increase slightly, but Reform UK overtook the Conservatives, increasing its vote to 29.8% (11th best result), meaning that Labour's margin of victory was unchanged at just over 19%.

Turnout

Turnout has ranged from 87.7% in 1950 to 49.5% in 2024. It has been somewhat inconsistent with national averages, falling in 1992 and 2005 when national turnout increased.

== Members of Parliament ==
Election	Member	Party
1950	Manny Shinwell	Labour
1970	Jack Dormand	Labour
1987	John Cummings	Labour
2010	Grahame Morris	Labour

== Elections ==
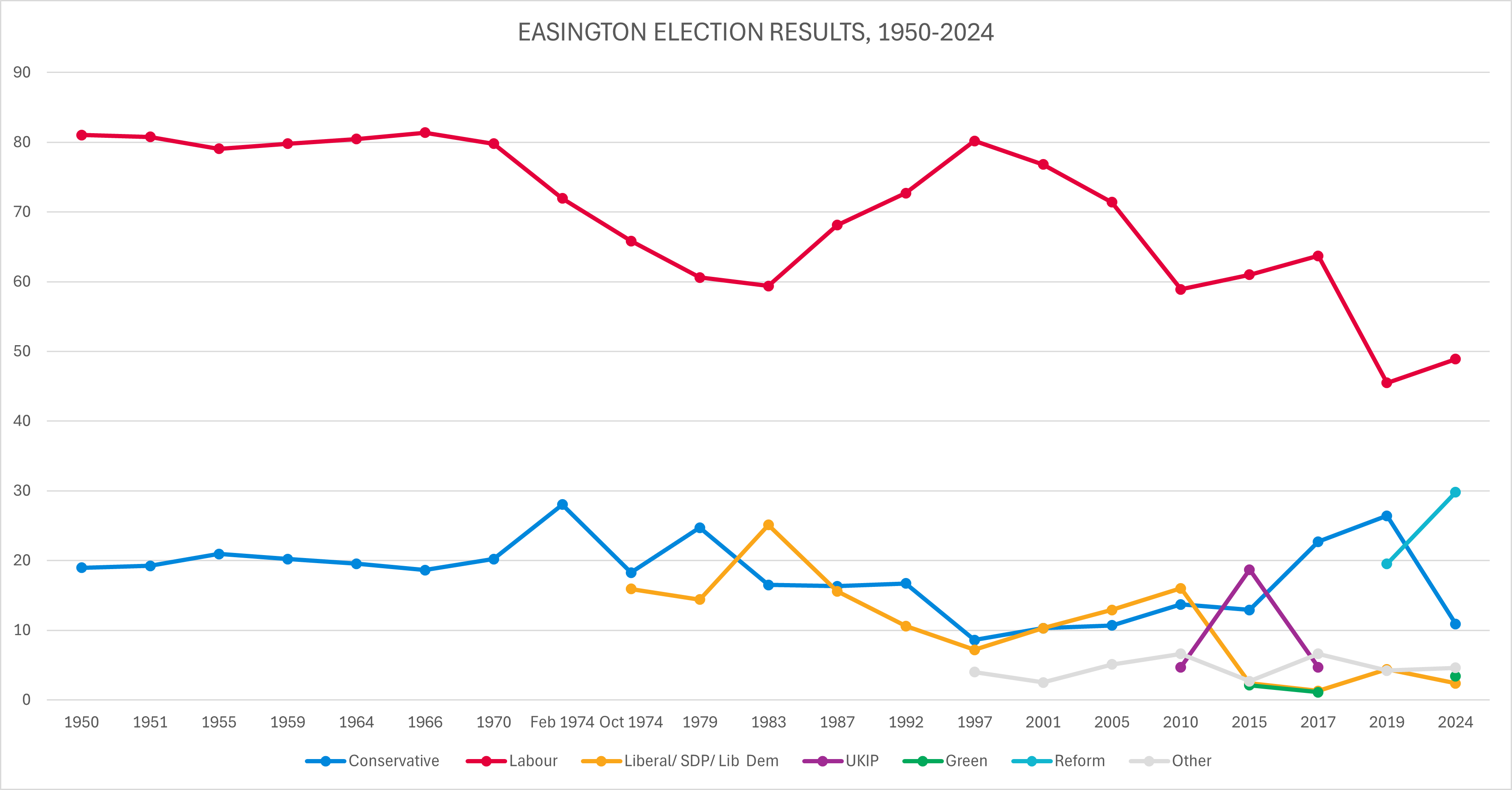
Election results 1950–2024

=== Elections in the 2020s ===
General election 2024: Easington
Party	Candidate	Votes	%	±%
Labour	Grahame Morris	16,774	48.9	+2.1
Reform	Lynn Murphy	10,232	29.8	+11.7
Conservative	Joanne Howey	3,753	10.9	−16.2
North East	Mary Cartwright	1,581	4.6	+1.0
Green	Stephen Ashfield	1,173	3.4	+3.1
Liberal Democrats	Tony Ferguson	811	2.4	−1.7
Majority		6,542	19.1	
Turnout		34,324	49.5	−7.4
Labour hold		Swing		

=== Elections in the 2010s ===
General election 2019: Easington
Party	Candidate	Votes	%	±%
Labour	Grahame Morris	15,723	45.5	−18.2
Conservative	Clare Ambrosino	9,142	26.4	+3.7
Brexit Party	Julie Maughan	6,744	19.5	New
Liberal Democrats	Dominic Haney	1,526	4.4	+3.1
North East	Susan McDonnell	1,448	4.2	−2.4
Majority		6,581	19.1	−21.9
Turnout		34,583	56.5	−1.9
Labour hold		Swing	−10.9	

General election 2017: Easington
Party	Candidate	Votes	%	±%
Labour	Grahame Morris	23,152	63.7	+2.7
Conservative	Barney Campbell	8,260	22.7	+9.8
North East	Susan McDonnell	2,355	6.6	+4.1
UKIP	Allyn Roberts	1,727	4.7	−14.0
Liberal Democrats	Tom Hancock	460	1.3	−1.1
Green	Martie Warin	410	1.1	−1.0
Majority		14,892	41.0	−1.3
Turnout		36,364	58.4	+2.3
Labour hold		Swing	−3.6	

General election 2015: Easington
Party	Candidate	Votes	%	±%
Labour	Grahame Morris	21,132	61.0	+2.1
UKIP	Jonathan Arnott	6,491	18.7	+14.0
Conservative	Chris Hampsheir	4,478	12.9	−0.8
Liberal Democrats	Luke Armstrong	834	2.4	−13.6
North East	Susan McDonnell	810	2.3	New
Green	Martie Warin	733	2.1	New
Socialist (GB)	Steve Colborn	146	0.4	New
Majority		14,641	42.3	−0.6
Turnout		34,624	56.1	+1.4
Labour hold		Swing	−6.0	

General election 2010: Easington
Party	Candidate	Votes	%	±%
Labour	Grahame Morris	20,579	58.9	−12.4
Liberal Democrats	Tara Saville	5,597	16.0	+3.1
Conservative	Richard Harrison	4,790	13.7	+3.0
BNP	Cheryl Dunn	2,317	6.6	+3.4
UKIP	Martyn Aiken	1,631	4.7	New
Majority		14,982	42.9	−15.6
Turnout		34,914	54.7	+2.8
Labour hold		Swing	−7.7	

=== Elections in the 2000s ===
General election 2005: Easington
Party	Candidate	Votes	%	±%
Labour	John Cummings	22,733	71.4	−5.4
Liberal Democrats	Christopher Ord	4,097	12.9	+2.6
Conservative	Lucille Nicholson	3,400	10.7	+0.4
BNP	Ian McDonald	1,042	3.3	New
Socialist Labour	Dave Robinson	583	1.8	−0.7
Majority		18,636	58.5	−8.0
Turnout		31,855	52.1	−1.5
Labour hold		Swing	−4.0	

General election 2001: Easington
Party	Candidate	Votes	%	±%
Labour	John Cummings	25,360	76.8	−3.4
Conservative	Philip F. Lovel	3,411	10.3	+1.7
Liberal Democrats	Christopher J. Ord	3,408	10.3	+3.1
Socialist Labour	Dave Robinson	831	2.5	New
Majority		21,949	66.5	−5.1
Turnout		33,010	53.6	−13.4
Labour hold		Swing		

=== Elections in the 1990s ===
General election 1997: Easington
Party	Candidate	Votes	%	±%
Labour	John Cummings	33,600	80.2	+7.5
Conservative	Jason D. Hollands	3,588	8.6	−8.1
Liberal Democrats	Jim P. Heppell	3,025	7.2	−3.4
Referendum	Richard B. Pulfrey	1,179	2.8	New
Socialist (GB)	Steve P. Colborn	503	1.2	New
Majority		30,012	71.6	+15.6
Turnout		41,895	67.0	−5.5
Labour hold		Swing	+7.8	

General election 1992: Easington
Party	Candidate	Votes	%	±%
Labour	John Cummings	34,269	72.7	+4.6
Conservative	William Perry	7,879	16.7	+0.4
Liberal Democrats	Peter Freitag	5,001	10.6	−5.0
Majority		26,390	56.0	+4.2
Turnout		47,149	72.5	−0.9
Labour hold		Swing	+2.1	

=== Elections in the 1980s ===
General election 1987: Easington
Party	Candidate	Votes	%	±%
Labour	John Cummings	32,396	68.1	+8.7
Conservative	William Perry	7,757	16.3	−0.2
Liberal	George Howard	7,447	15.6	−9.5
Majority		24,639	51.8	+18.5
Turnout		47,600	73.4	+5.9
Labour hold		Swing		

General election 1983: Easington
Party	Candidate	Votes	%	±%
Labour	Jack Dormand	25,912	59.4	−1.2
Liberal	Frank E. Patterson	11,120	25.1	+10.7
Conservative	Colin J. Coulson-Thomas	7,342	16.5	−8.2
Majority		14,792	33.3	−2.6
Turnout		44,374	67.5	−6.8
Labour hold		Swing		

=== Elections in the 1970s ===
General election 1979: Easington
Party	Candidate	Votes	%	±%
Labour	Jack Dormand	29,537	60.60	
Conservative	J.S. Smailes	11,981	24.70	
Liberal	V. Morley	6,979	14.39	
Majority		17,556	35.90	
Turnout		48,497	74.33	
Labour hold		Swing		

General election October 1974: Easington
Party	Candidate	Votes	%	±%
Labour	Jack Dormand	28,984	65.82	
Conservative	J.S. Smailes	8,047	18.27	
Liberal	N.J. Scaggs	7,005	15.91	New
Majority		20,937	47.55	
Turnout		44,036	69.01	
Labour hold		Swing		

General election February 1974: Easington
Party	Candidate	Votes	%	±%
Labour	Jack Dormand	33,637	71.96	
Conservative	J.S. Smailes	13,107	28.04	
Majority		20,530	43.92	
Turnout		46,744	73.95	
Labour hold		Swing		

General election 1970: Easington
Party	Candidate	Votes	%	±%
Labour	Jack Dormand	33,418	79.80	
Conservative	Michael Spicer	8,457	20.20	
Majority		24,961	59.60	
Turnout		41,875	69.28	
Labour hold		Swing		

=== Elections in the 1960s ===
General election 1966: Easington
Party	Candidate	Votes	%	±%
Labour	Manny Shinwell	32,097	81.37	
Conservative	Michael Spicer	7,350	18.63	
Majority		24,747	62.74	
Turnout		39,447	70.54	
Labour hold		Swing		

General election 1964: Easington
Party	Candidate	Votes	%	±%
Labour	Manny Shinwell	34,028	80.45	
Conservative	George W Rossiter	8,270	19.55	
Majority		25,758	60.90	
Turnout		42,298	75.22	
Labour hold		Swing		

=== Elections in the 1950s ===
General election 1959: Easington
Party	Candidate	Votes	%	±%
Labour	Manny Shinwell	36,552	79.79	
Conservative	George W Rossiter	9,259	20.21	
Majority		27,293	59.58	
Turnout		45,811	80.81	
Labour hold		Swing		

General election 1955: Easington
Party	Candidate	Votes	%	±%
Labour	Manny Shinwell	34,352	79.07	
Conservative	George W Rossiter	9,095	20.93	
Majority		25,257	58.14	
Turnout		43,447	79.36	
Labour hold		Swing		

General election 1951: Easington
Party	Candidate	Votes	%	±%
Labour	Manny Shinwell	37,899	80.77	
Conservative	George W Rossiter	9,025	19.23	
Majority		28,874	61.54	
Turnout		46,924	86.74	
Labour hold		Swing		

General election 1950: Easington
Party	Candidate	Votes	%	±%
Labour	Manny Shinwell	38,367	81.05	
Conservative	C.A. Macfarlane	8,972	18.95	
Majority		29,395	62.10	
Turnout		47,339	87.69	
Labour win (new seat)				

== See also ==
- Parliamentary constituencies in County Durham
- History of parliamentary constituencies and boundaries in Durham
- List of parliamentary constituencies in North East England (region)
