= Thornley, Durham =

Village in England

Coordinates: 54.750°N 1.437°W

Thornley
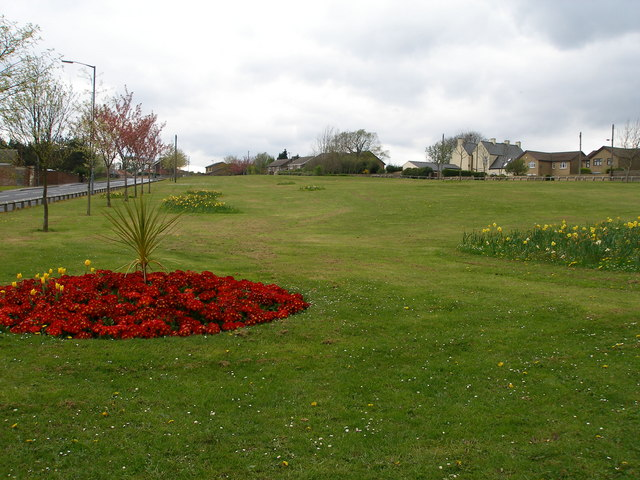
- Thornley village green

- Location within County Durham
- Population: 2,457 (2011)
- OS grid reference: NZ363395
- Civil parish: Thornley
- Unitary authority: County Durham
- Ceremonial county: County Durham
- Region: North East
- Country: England
- Sovereign state: United Kingdom
- Post town: DURHAM
- Postcode district: DH6
- Dialling code: 01429
- Police: Durham
- Fire: County Durham and Darlington
- Ambulance: North East
- UK Parliament: Easington
- Website: Parish Council

See also Thornley in Weardale.

Thornley is a village and civil parish in County Durham, England, about 5 miles (9 km) to the east of Durham and 5 miles (7 km) west of Peterlee. The community grew around a coal mine established in 1835, which remained open until 1970.

== Governance ==
The first tier of local government is Thornley Parish Council. Most functions are carried out by Durham County Council, a unitary authority. Thornley is part of Trimdon and Thornley electoral division, which elects three members of the county council.

Thornley is part of the Sedgefield parliamentary constituency of which Tony Blair was the Member of Parliament from 1983 until 2007.

== History ==
=== Mining ===
As with most villages in the area, it grew rapidly with the development of coal-mining in the region. The first shaft was sunk in 1835 and the first coals were delivered via a new mineral railway line to Hartlepool shortly thereafter. The village thus played a major role in the development of Hartlepool as a port. Thornley miners played a key role in the formation of the Durham Miners' Association, the first meeting of which was held in the grounds of the village's Half-Way House public house in 1869. The colliery closed in 1970 with the loss of over 900 jobs and there is now little evidence to be seen of its once extensive plant and machinery.

=== Rebuilding ===
Easington Rural District Council's policy in the 1960s, 1970s and 1980s was to actively discourage development and employment in the ex-colliery villages of East Durham in favour of the new town of Peterlee. One of the oldest surviving buildings in the village, the Half-Way House was extensively refurbished and extended in the late 1970s and renamed The Crossways Hotel. The building was demolished in early 2008 and planning permission has been given for the building of housing on the site. Permission has also been given for the demolition of another old building, Gore Hall Farm, for the same purpose.

Only recently has new house building been sanctioned by the council in the so-called 'bottom end' of the village. In the meantime, two estates of 20th century council housing have recently been demolished due to the decline in the village's population since the closure of the colliery, Thornlaw North and Coopers Close. The latter was built as recently as 1968 at the expense of a children's recreation ground, several mature trees and many local garden allotments which were also not replaced. The demolition of the Thornlaw North estate has allowed the council to sell the land to a large housebuilding company, Persimmon plc, to build 'executive' housing. A small amount of affordable housing will be built. This project is now (December 2007) well advanced. The council believes that one consequence of the reduction in population is that existing services will be threatened. Plans for the Cooper's Close site have yet to be revealed.

St Bartholomew's Church in the heart of the village, which dates from 1843, was demolished in September 2007. Houses are to be built on the site and many gravestones in the churchyard have already been moved. However, its stained glass windows have been preserved and are currently held in storage for possible future display. The village once had two cinemas, The Hippodrome, built in 1912 and The Ritz, built in 1938: both have been demolished.

Lt John Scott Youll, a former electrician at Thornley Colliery, was awarded the Victoria Cross during his service with the Northumberland Fusiliers in Italy in World War One. The village's war memorial had a special monument added to it in his honour in 2005.

== Sport ==
A greyhound racing and whippet racing track known as the Thornley Greyhound Stadium and earlier the Halfway House running grounds (because of the Halfway House Inn situated next door) existed on the junction of Dunelem Road and the A181. The racing was independent (not affiliated to the sports governing body the National Greyhound Racing Club) and was known as a flapping track, which was the nickname given to independent tracks. The stadium was active in 1936 and was still in place in 1967 but had been demolished by 1976.

== Gallery ==
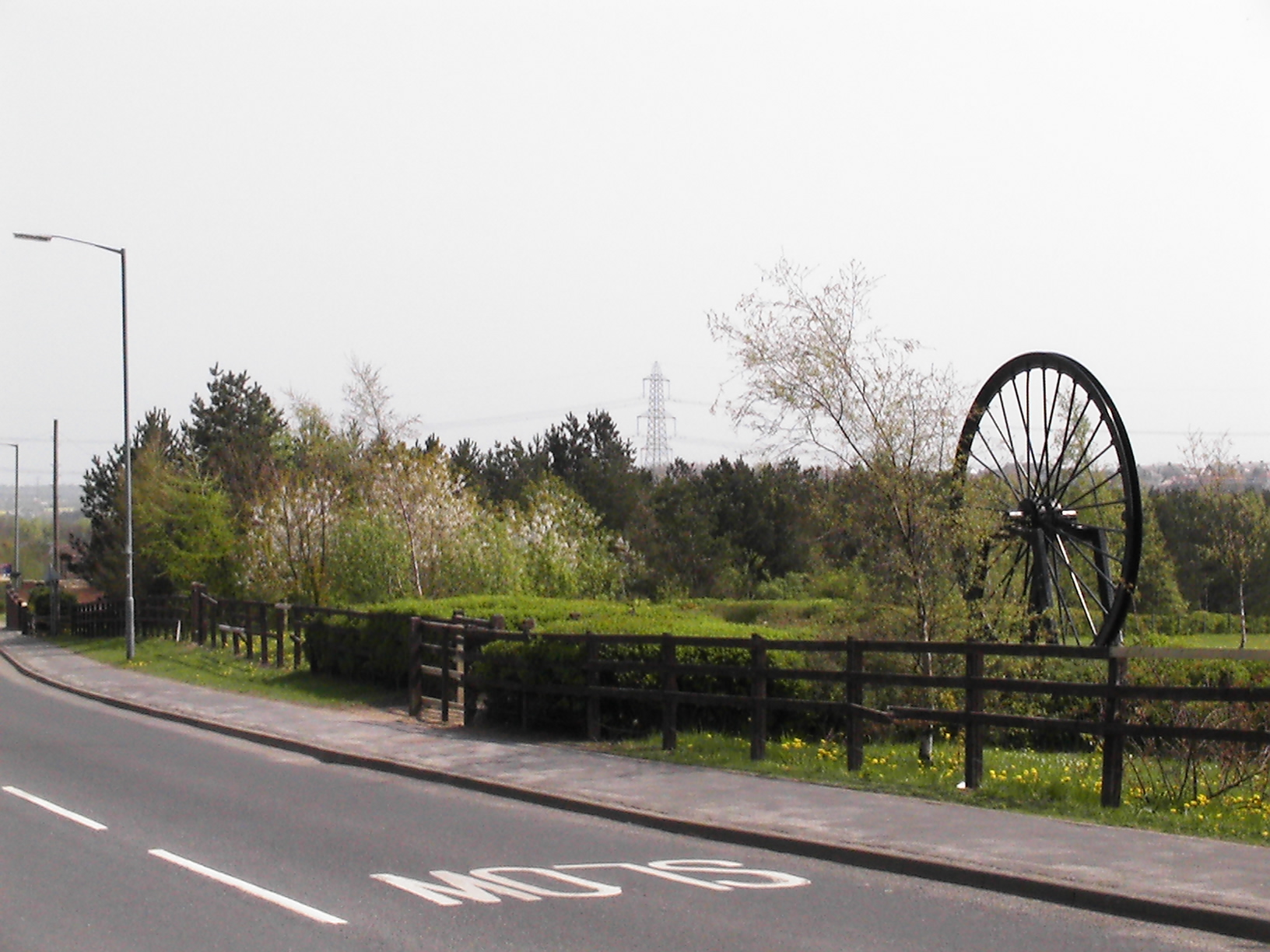
This memorial pit wheel was put in place in 1990. The tree-lined area to the rear covers the site of the actual colliery. The road is the former High Street. Photograph taken in May 2006

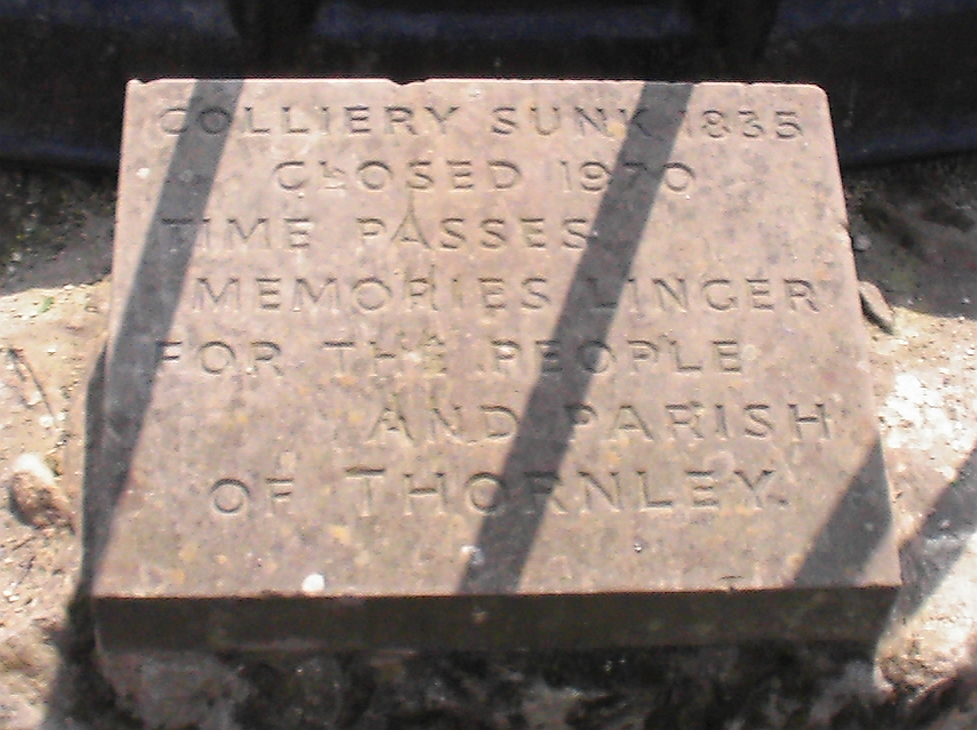
The inscribed stone at the base of the Pit Wheel, photographed in May 2006

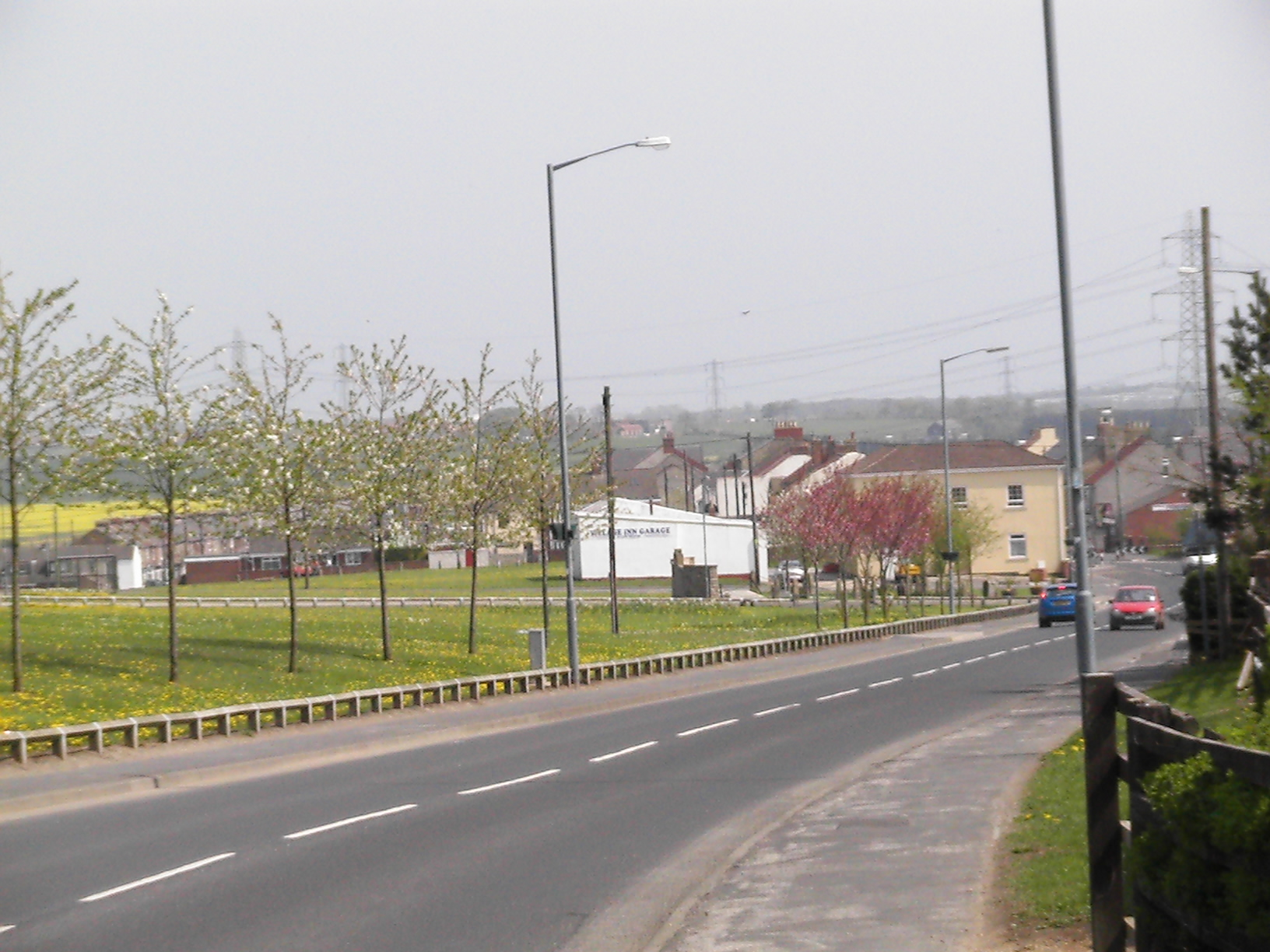
The former High Street, Thornley, photographed in 2006. The War Memorial and Colliery Inn are visible in the distance. The colliery was off the picture to the right. Photograph taken in May 2006

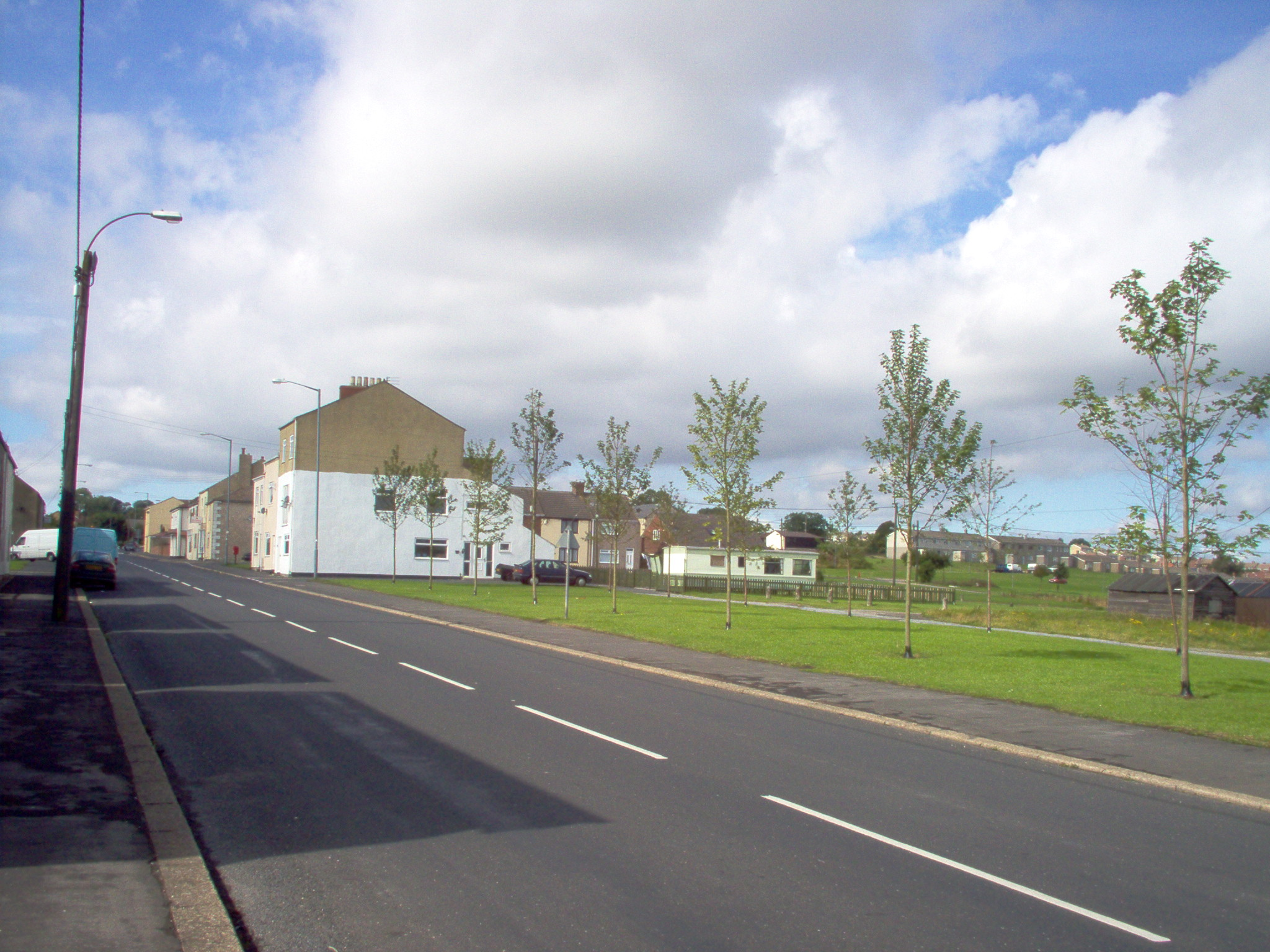
Hartlepool St Thornley, in 2005. This was once the main shopping street of the village

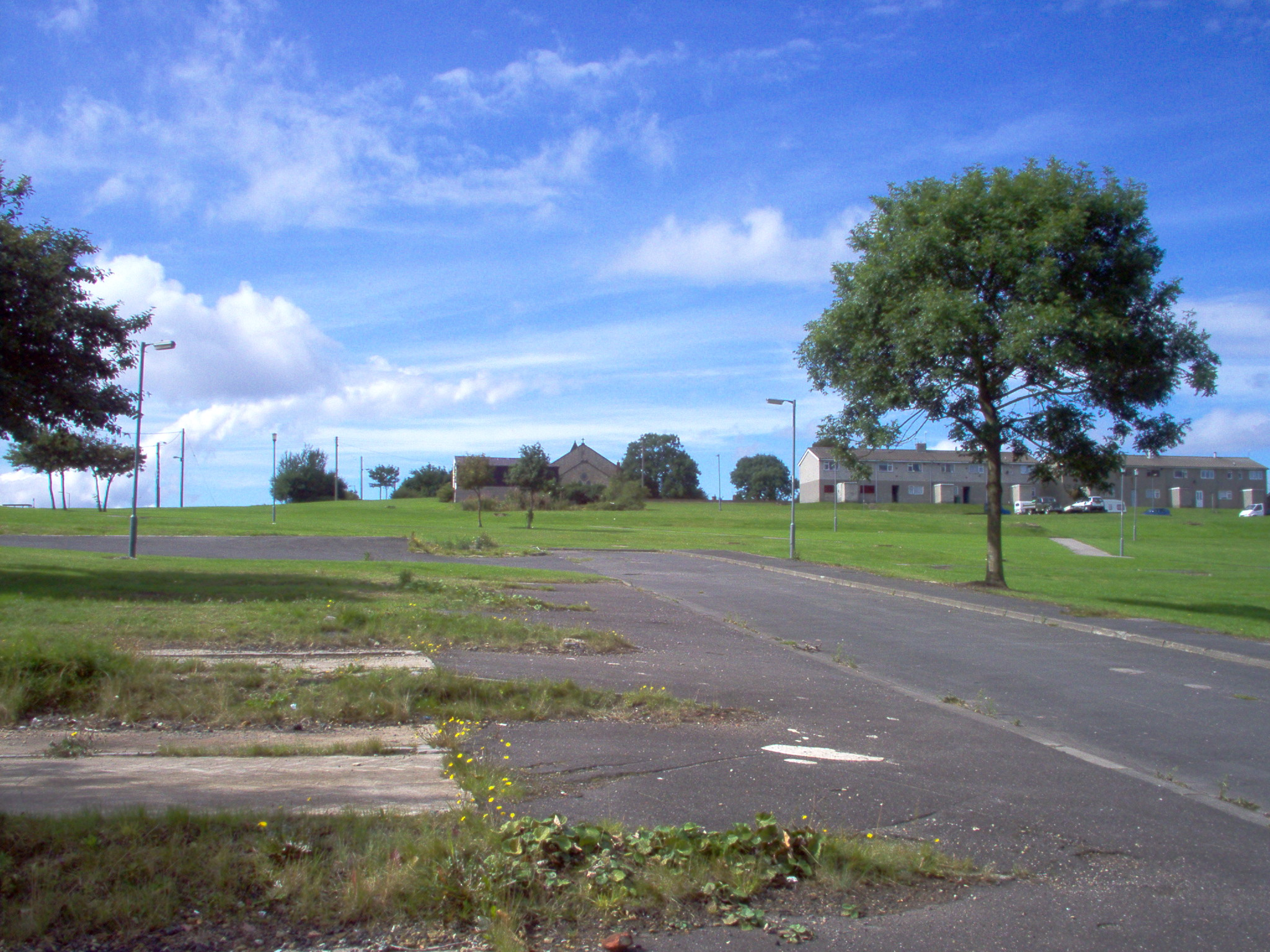
Looking up towards St Bartholomew's Church and the remains of the Coopers Close Estate, Thornley, 2005. The housing at the right of the picture was demolished in 2007

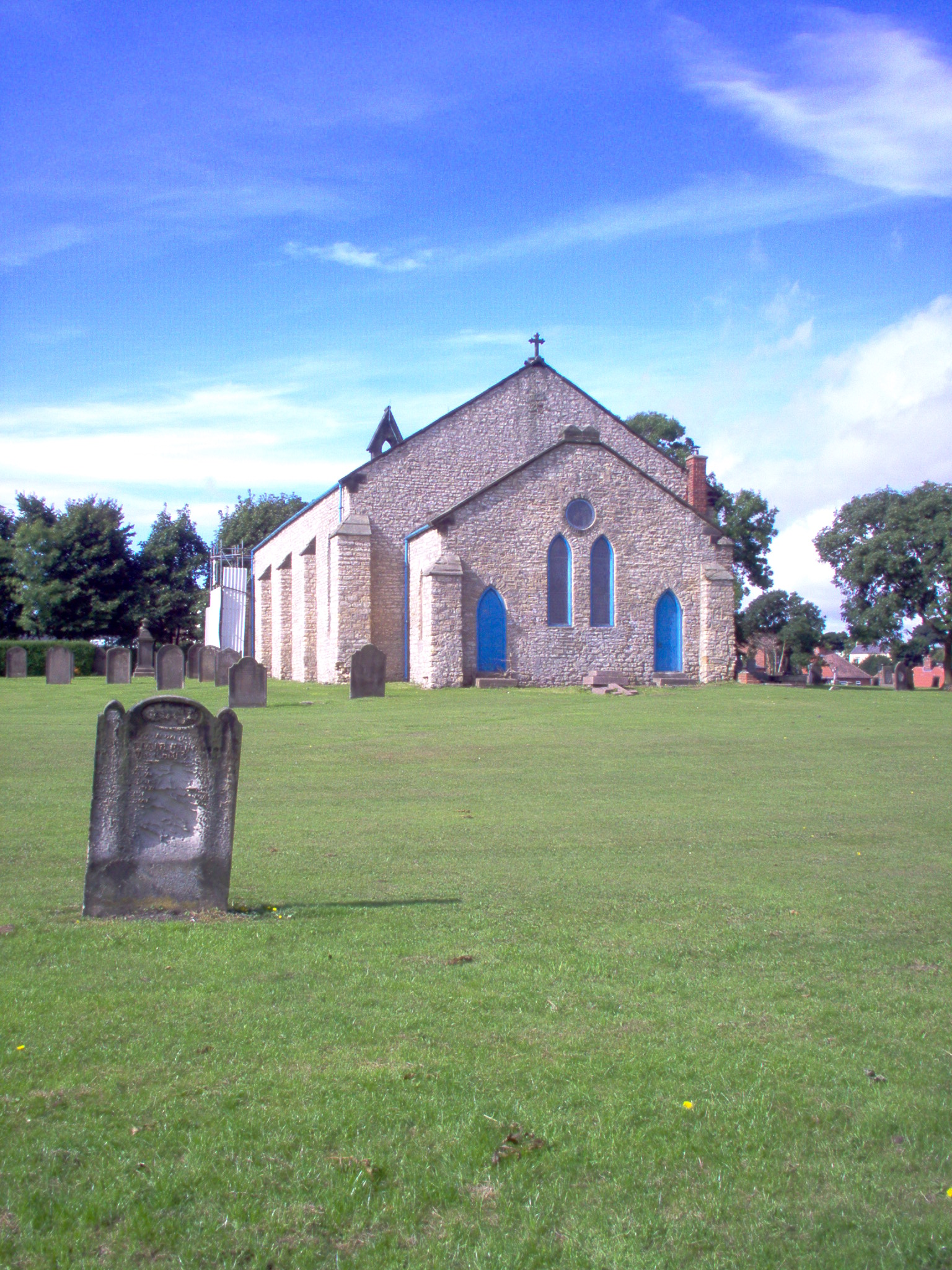
St Bartholomew's Church, Thornley. This photograph was taken in 2005 after the church's closure but prior to the removal of its stained glass windows. The church was demolished in September 2007

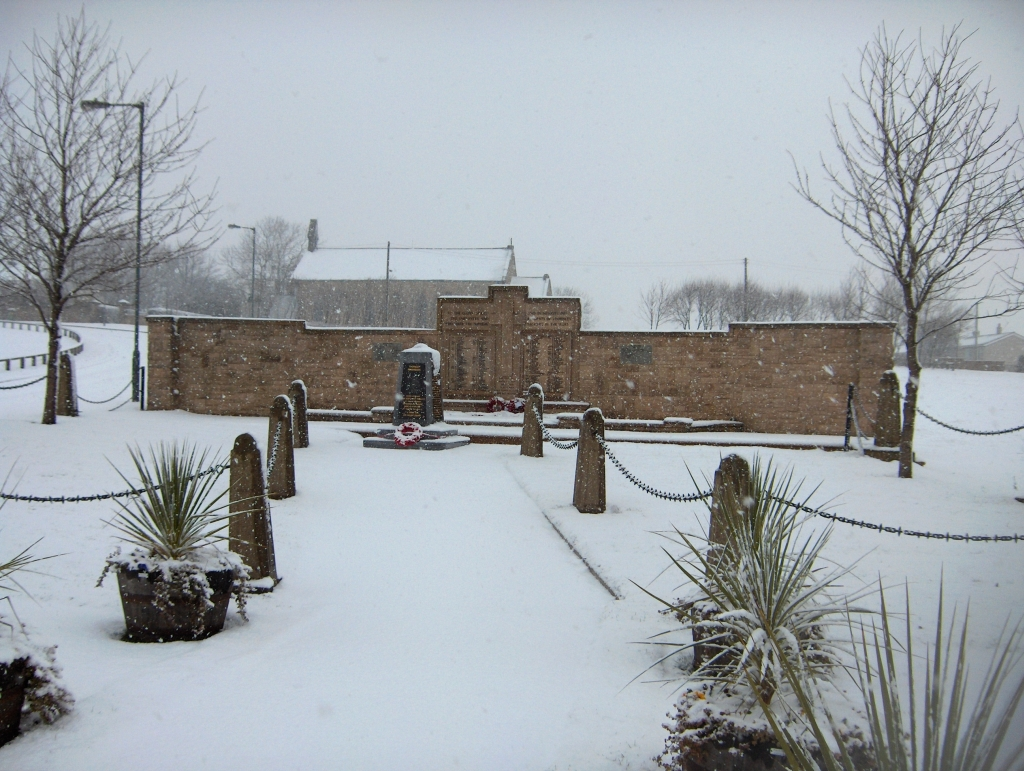
The Thornley War Memorial in 2005, with the John Scott Youll VC Memorial in the foreground and St Bartholomew's Church to the rear

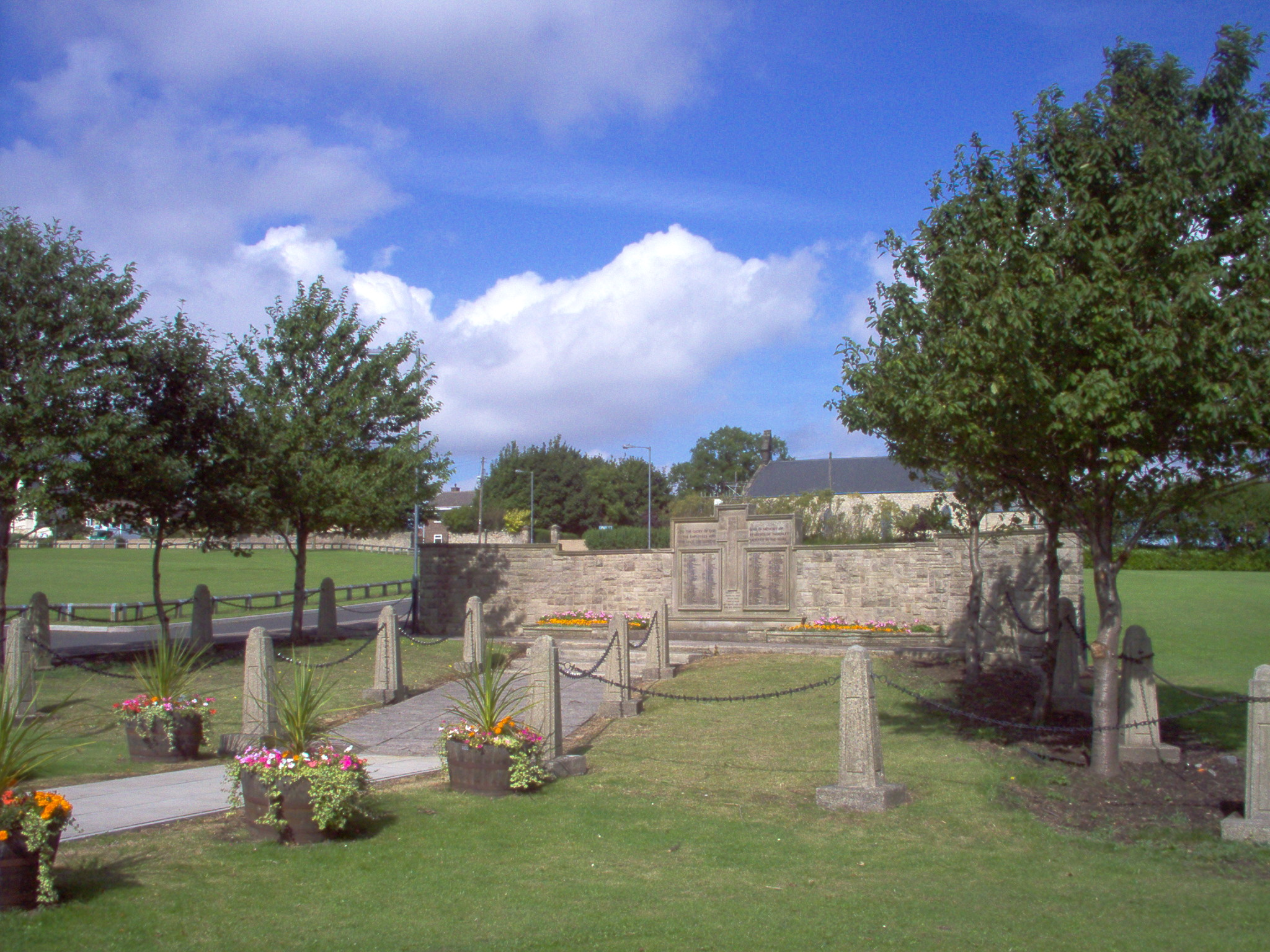
The Thornley War Memorial in 2005, prior to the addition of the John Scott Youll VC monument. The colliery was directly opposite to the Memorial. Hartlepool Street ran down to the right and High Street up to the left.
