= Easington Academy =

Coordinates: 54.781876°N 1.354896°W

Location
- Stockton Road; County Durham, SR8 3AY; England

Information
- Type: Academy
- Department for Education URN: 138075 Tables
- Ofsted: Reports
- Headteacher: Nicola Falconer
- Age: 11 to 16
- Website: www.easingtonacademy.co.uk

Easington Academy is a secondary school with academy status located in the village of Easington, County Durham, England.

== History ==
The school was first created as Easington Comprehensive School in 1978, as a result of a merger between Easington Secondary Modern School and Murton Secondary Modern School. The school was later renamed Easington Community School, and then Easington Community Science College in January 2007 after becoming a specialist science college. The school has become an academy school, and is now known as Easington Academy.

In 2019, the Academy joined the North East Learning Trust.

== House system ==
The school's house names are based on the family surnames most affected in the 1951 Easington Colliery pit disaster; points are allocated in school assemblies, performances, etc.

They Were Named

- Brenkley
- Dryden
- Porter
- Seymour
- Wallace

As Of June 2021 They Are Called

- Evolution
- Ambition
- Integrity
- Synergy

== Buildings ==
Currently, Easington Academy is made up of five buildings used for teaching:

- The Main Building (Music, Science and Technology)
- H-Block North (Geography, History, Religious Studies, as well as Mathematics)
- H-Block South (English, ICT, Modern Foreign Languages)
- Art Studio (Art and Photography)
- Sports Hall (Sports Studies and Physical Education)

Option subjects such as Health & Social Care and Travel & Tourism may be taught across multiple different buildings and don't have a fixed area on the site.

== Subjects Taught ==
Year 7, 8 and 9 students are taught the following subjects: English, Maths, Science, French, Geography, History, Religious Education, PSHE (branded as "World Ready"), Music, Drama, ICT and Physical Education.

In year 9, students choose up to four GCSE options to take up until year 11. Students meeting their targets in French, or are close to their targets must take GCSE French - in line with guidelines surrounding the English Baccalaureate. To further satisfy these requirements, all students must take either GCSE Geography, or GCSE History. Students then get two more options, or three if the child is not required to take French.

== Notable former pupils ==
The school's alumni include documentary filmmaker Carl Joyce and such professional footballers as Newcastle goalkeeper Steve Harper, Paul Kitson, Chris Brass, Paul Smith, Richard Ord, Stuart Brightwell, and Adam Johnson.
