= Easington, County Durham =

Village and civil parish in Northern England

Coordinates: 54.78°N 1.35°W

Easington: Easington Village
- Village and civil parish
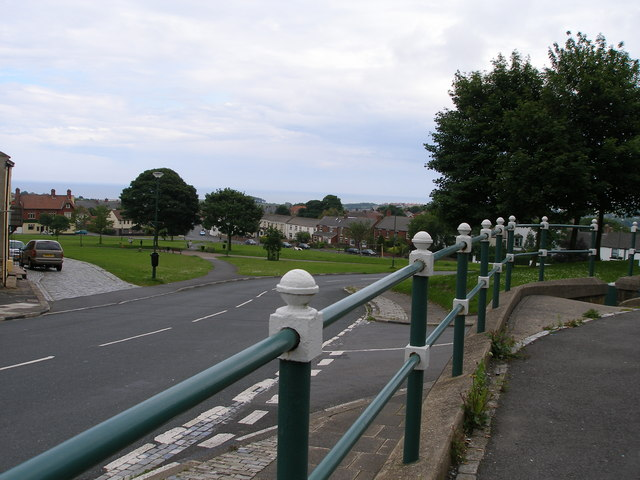
- The village green

- Location within County Durham
- Population: 2,171
- OS grid reference: NZ415432
- Civil parish: Easington Village
- Unitary authority: County Durham
- Ceremonial county: County Durham
- Region: North East
- Country: England
- Sovereign state: United Kingdom
- Post town: PETERLEE
- Postcode district: SR8
- Dialling code: 0191
- Police: Durham
- Fire: County Durham and Darlington
- Ambulance: North East
- UK Parliament: Easington

Easington, also known as Easington Village, is a village and civil parish in eastern County Durham, England. It is located at the junction of the A182 and B1283, leading north-west to Hetton-le-Hole and south east to Horden.

It is near the A19, which travels north to Seaham and Sunderland as well as south to Peterlee and Stockton-on-Tees. The population of Easington Village was 2,164 in 2001, increasing slightly to 2,171 at the 2011 Census.

== History ==
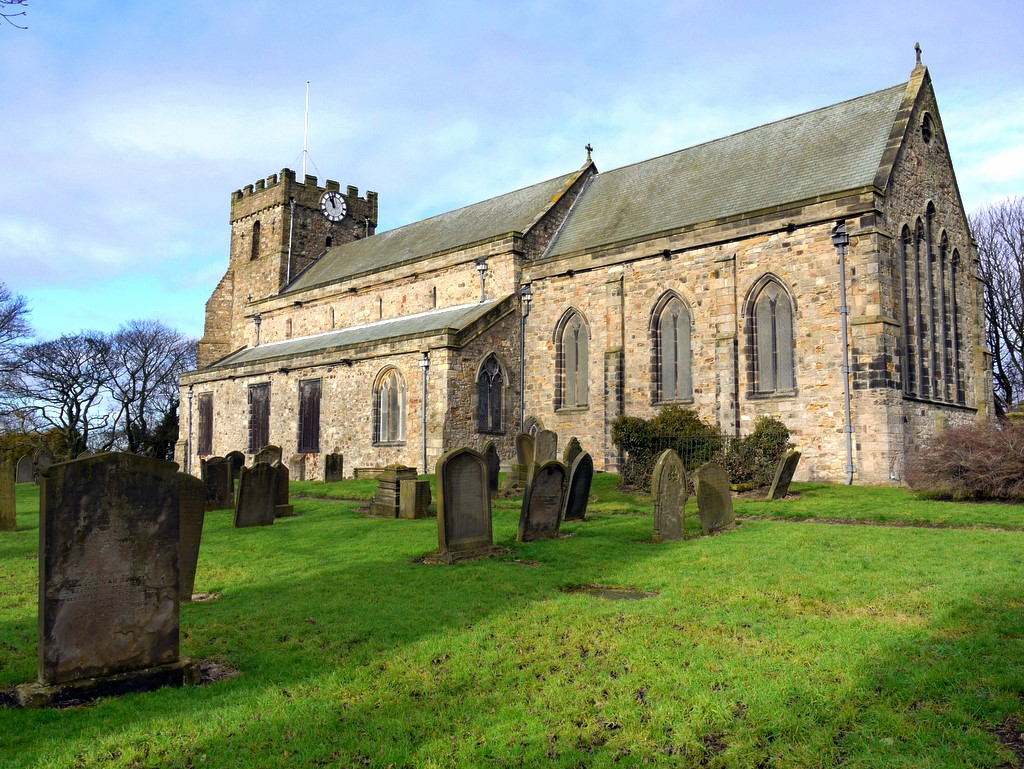
St Mary the Virgin, Easington

There is evidence of Easington having been an important pre-Norman Conquest site, including architectural fragments (dating from as early as the 8th century) found within the fabric of St Mary's Church. St Mary's itself was originally 12th–13th century, and contains a notable amount of seventeenth-century woodwork. From 1256 until 1832 the Rector of Easington was also Archdeacon of Durham. The church was largely rebuilt in 1888-89.

One of the most prominent events in the long history of the village was the hanging of two men on the village green for involvement in the plot to replace Tudor monarch Queen Elizabeth with Mary, Queen of Scots. Pope Adrian IV (c. 1100–1 September 1159), born Nicholas Breakspear, lived here for a time. The village is also known as the setting of the folktale, "The Legend of the Easington hare".

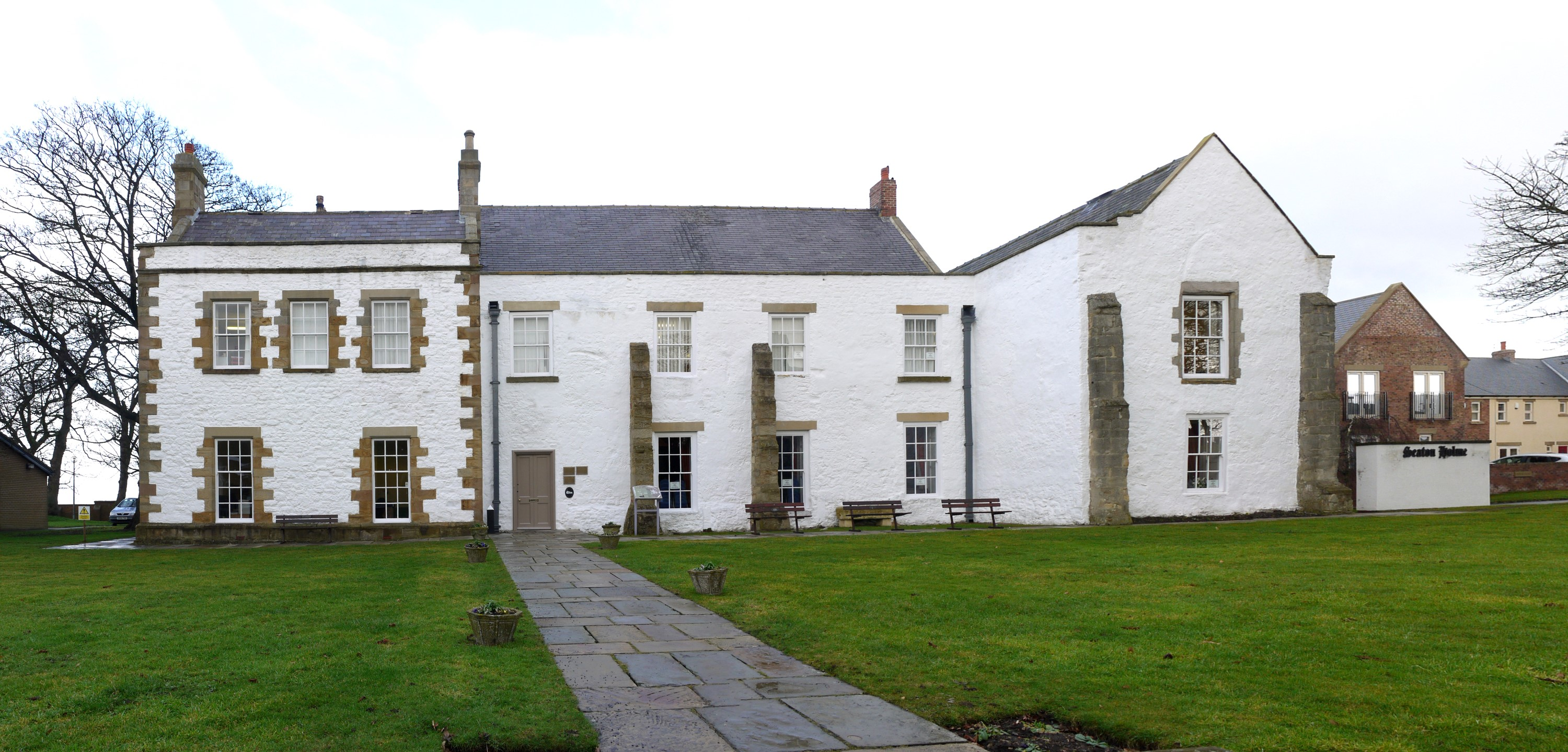
Seaton Holme

The village is home to one of the few remaining 13th-century domestic buildings (open-hall) in the country, Seaton Holme. It became an archdeacon's residence, served as the rectory until around 1960 and was a children's home for a time before falling into disrepair. In 1992 it was finally restored to a semblance of its former stature.

From 1894 to 1974 Easington was in Easington Rural District, in 1974 Easington became part of Easington non-metropolitan district. On 1 April 1983 the parish was abolished and split to form Easington Colliery and "Easington Village". At the 1971 census (one of the last before the abolition of the parish), Easington had a population of 9264. In 2009 Easington became part of County Durham unitary authority area.

=== Overshadowed ===
The sinking of coal mines near the village began on 11 April 1899. The settlement of Easington Colliery developed around the colliery. The settlements along the B1283 road has resulted in both settlements merging. However, the two places have retained their distinctive characters and continue to reflect different trends. Easington Colliery was the last pit to close on the Durham Coalfields in 1993, with the loss of 1,400 jobs.

== Amenities ==
There were two post offices in Easington. The one in the town serves the top of Easington, the middle post office serves the area which is predominantly council properties, and the lower post office served the colliery housing area. This post office closed on 10 October 2008 after being cut in the closure scheme by the Post Office. Easington Academy is located in the village. It acts as the main secondary school for the village and surrounding area.

== Demography ==
Easington is notable for being the town with the highest percentage of white residents in England (99.2% white in 2001). According to the results of the 2001 census, it also has the UK's lowest population of Jedi knights.

== Notable people ==
- Matt Baker – television presenter (Blue Peter, Countryfile, The One Show)
- Dennis Donnini – VC recipient
- Steve Harper – Newcastle United goalkeeper
- Rachel Howard – artist
- Jez Lowe – folksinger and songwriter
- Kevin Scott – Newcastle United footballer
- Tom Simpson – champion cyclist
- Adam Johnson – Sunderland footballer
- Alan Tate – Swansea City footballer
- James Isaacson – Newcastle Falcons rugby player
- Ian Cranson – Ipswich, Sheffield Wednesday and Stoke City footballer.

== In popular culture ==
The film Billy Elliot, set in the fictional County Durham town of Everington, was mainly shot in Easington, though the filmmakers had to go a long way north to Ellington to find the only working mine in the North East. The subsequent stage musical version specifically identifies Easington as its location.

Easington was one of the locations the Ken Loach directed film The Old Oak was filmed.
