= James Isaacson =

English rugby union footballer and coach

- Born: James Isaacson; 7 January 1980 (age 46) Easington, County Durham, England
- Height: 5 ft 11 in (1.80 m)
- Weight: 17 st 4 lb (242 lb; 110 kg)
- School: Durham School
- University: Northumbria University

Rugby union career
- Position(s): Prop, Hooker
Senior career
Years	Team	Apps	(Points)
1998-2005	Newcastle Falcons	57	(5)
2005-2007	Leeds Carnegie	17	
International career
Years	Team	Apps	(Points)
- England U-21

James Isaacson (born 7 January 1980 in Easington, County Durham) is an English former rugby union footballer who played in the 1990s and 2000s. He played at club level for Newcastle Falcons and Leeds Carnegie, as a Prop, or Hooker. He was educated at Durham School, Northumbria University and Life University.

== Rugby career ==
Isaacson is an England Under 21 international, and in 1998 joined Newcastle Falcons. He remained at the club until 2005 when he was signed by Leeds Tykes, (Yorkshire Carnegie from 2014). He remained with Leeds for two seasons and was part of the squad that saw the club promoted to the Premiership. He left Leeds at the end of 2007. Isaacson was Head Coach of Life University from 2010 to 2013 predominantly in the US Super League. Whilst with Life they made the Super League Final (2011), Elite Cup Final (2012, 2013) and D1 Cup Final (2013) winning the latter. Dr. Isaacson graduated from Life University in March 2014 and currently practices in Randolph, New Jersey.
