= Grahame Morris =

British politician (born 1961)

Grahame Morris MP
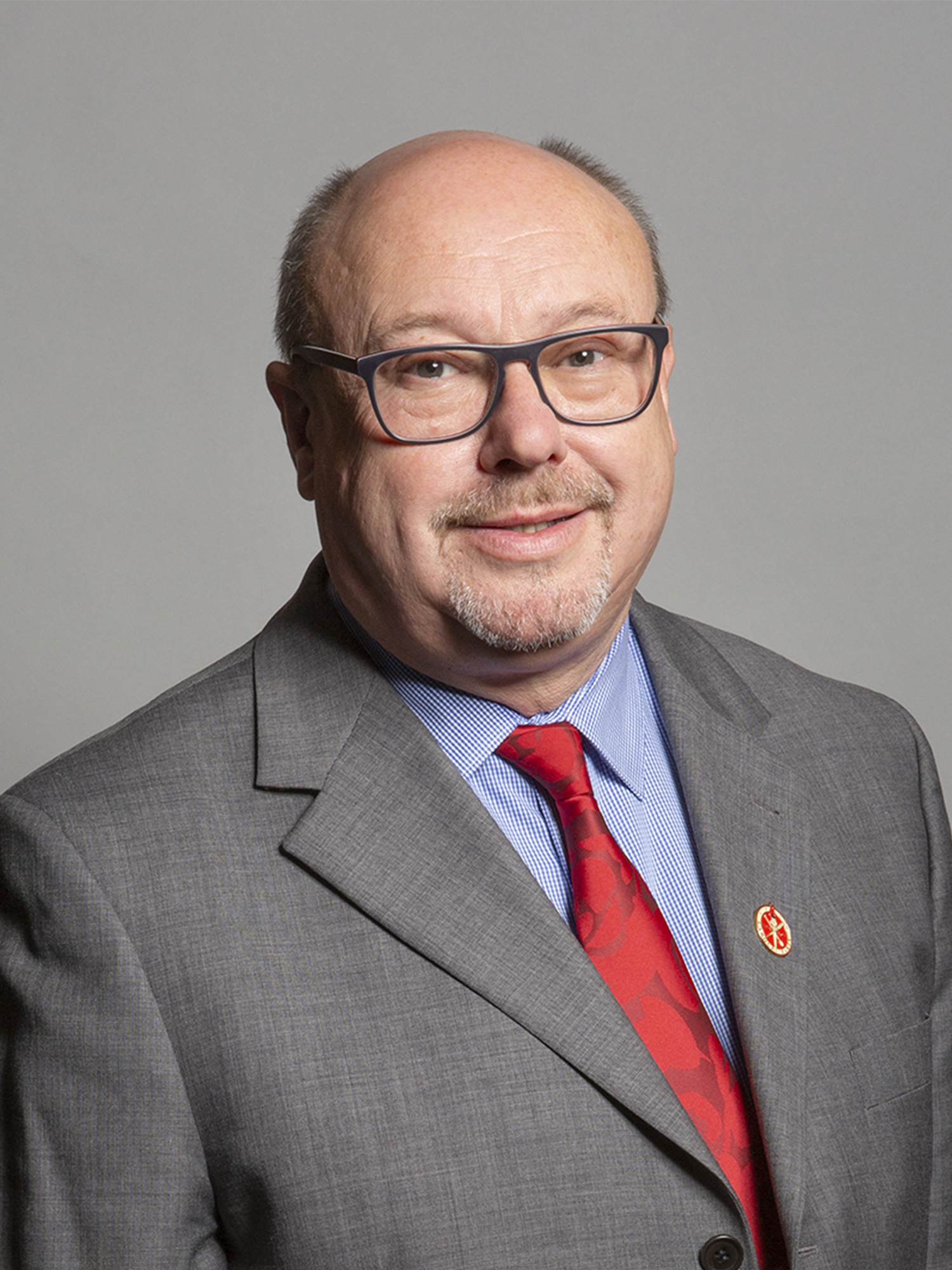
- Official portrait, 2020

Shadow Secretary of State for Communities and Local Government
- In office 27 June 2016 – 7 October 2016
- Leader: Jeremy Corbyn
- Preceded by: Jon Trickett
- Succeeded by: Teresa Pearce

Member of Parliament for Easington
- Incumbent
- Assumed office 6 May 2010
- Preceded by: John Cummings
- Majority: 6,581 (19.0%)

Personal details
- Born: Grahame Mark Morris; 13 March 1961 (age 65)
- Party: Labour
- Other political affiliations: Socialist Campaign Group
- Education: Newcastle College; Newcastle Polytechnic
- Website: Official website

Grahame Mark Morris (born 13 March 1961) is a British politician. A member of the Labour Party, he has been the Member of Parliament (MP) for Easington since 2010.

Morris briefly served on the Opposition frontbench of Jeremy Corbyn in 2016, and now remains in the House of Commons as a backbencher.

== Early life and career ==
Grahame Morris was born on 13 March 1961, and was educated at Howletch Comprehensive School (now East Durham College). He first worked as a medical laboratory scientific officer in hospitals in Sunderland. Morris has been involved with politics since 1987 when he became a District Councillor for Easington. He worked as a researcher for his predecessor MP for Easington John Cummings since 1997, and was also Secretary of Easington Labour Party.

== Parliamentary career ==
At the 2010 general election, Morris was elected to Parliament as MP for Easington with 58.9% of the vote and a majority of 14,982. He was one of a handful of Labour MPs newly elected in 2010 considered to be on the left of the party politically.

Morris chairs the Labour Friends of Palestine and the Middle East. In October 2014, he presented the motion in Parliament calling on the government to formally recognise Palestinian statehood.

Morris was one of 16 signatories of an open letter to Ed Miliband in January 2015 calling on the party to commit to oppose further austerity, take rail franchises back into public ownership and strengthen collective bargaining arrangements.

At the 2015 general election, Morris was re-elected as MP for Easington with an increased vote share of 61% and a decreased majority of 14,641.

Morris was one of 36 Labour MPs to nominate Jeremy Corbyn as a candidate in the Labour leadership election of 2015, after the 2015 general election.

On 27 June 2016, Morris was appointed to the Shadow Cabinet as Shadow Secretary of State for Communities and Local Government and Shadow Minister for the Constitutional Convention.

Morris was again re-elected at the snap 2017 general election, with an increased vote share of 63.7% and an increased majority of 14,892.

On 22 April 2019, Morris retweeted a video he had received, supposedly about Palestinian children, and captioned it as Israeli soldiers "caught on camera beating up Palestinian children for the fun of it". However, the video was actually of Guatemalan, not Israeli, soldiers. Morris later apologised and said it was an "honest mistake". He referenced the dangers of fake news and said he would check sources with more care in future.

At the 2019 general election, Morris was again re-elected, with a decreased vote share of 45.5% and a decreased majority of 6,581. He was again re-elected at the 2024 general election, with an increased vote share of 48.9% and a decreased majority of 6,542.

== Personal life ==
Morris lives in Seaham, County Durham. He is a fan of Sunderland A.F.C.

Parliament of the United Kingdom
Preceded by John Cummings	Member of Parliament for Easington; 2010–present	Incumbent
Political offices
Preceded by Jon Trickett	Shadow Secretary of State for Communities and Local Government; 2016	Succeeded by Teresa Pearce
Preceded by Jon Trickett	Shadow Minister for the Constitutional Convention; 2016	Succeeded by Teresa Pearce
