= Old Wingate =

Village in County Durham, England

Coordinates: 54.732°N 1.403°W

Old Wingate is a small village in County Durham, in England. It is situated a short distance to the west of Wingate. Most of the village was deserted in the Middle Ages.
