= St Aidan's Catholic Academy =

Location
- Willow Bank Road; Ashbrooke, Tyne and Wear, SR2 7HJ; England
- 54°53′35″N 1°23′18″W

Information
- Type: Academy
- Motto: Deus Lux Nostra trans. God is Our Light
- Religious affiliation: Roman Catholic
- Department for Education URN: 139538 Tables
- Ofsted: Reports
- Headteacher: Anne Marie Whitten
- Chaplain: Kasia Szczepanska
- Gender: Boys
- Age: 11 to 18
- Enrolment: 845
- Houses: Ashbrook (Aquin & Bede), Corby (Corby & Fisher), Brookfield (More, Rice & David)
- Colours: Black & Yellow
- Website: http://www.staidanscatholicacademy.co.uk/

St Aidan's Catholic Academy (formerly St Aidan's Catholic School) is a Roman Catholic boys' secondary school and sixth form with academy status, situated in the Ashbrooke area of Sunderland. It caters for boys from ages 11 to 18, providing GCSE and A Level and BTEC qualifications as part of its teaching programme. The school was founded by the Christian Brothers, and is coupled with St Anthony's Girls' Catholic Academy, its sister school which is located nearby.

It is also twinned with St Joseph's Agricultural School In Blama, Sierra Leone.

== History ==
Canon Smith, then parish priest of St Mary’s in Sunderland, founded St Mary's Grammar School at Bede Towers in 1928/29. The building on Burdon Road is a villa in Italianate style originally the home of Mayor John Moore. Records show the first schoolmaster, Mr J Goundry, was a layman. The Jesuits took over the running of the school in 1935 – two years after taking on Ashbrooke Hall as a retreat for local Catholic men and renaming it Corby Hall. Ashbrooke Hall, in Ashbrooke Road, had originally been built for glassmaker James Hartley in 1864 by architect Thomas Moore, whose masterpiece was Monkwearmouth Station. It later became the home of the Short shipbuilding family, before being taken over by the Jesuits. The original Superior of the teaching staff, and of Corby Hall Retreat House, was Father SJ Whittaker. It was opened on 8 October 1933 by the Bishop of Hexham and Newcastle, Joseph Thorman and closed in 1973.

The school transferred from Bede Towers to The Briery in Ashbrooke Road in 1936 – previously the home of Mr Craven of Craven Ropery. There was a pedestrian tunnel under the road to gardens opposite, which the school later used as a sports ground. The name was then changed to Corby Hall, to avoid confusion with another school. Further confusion arose, however, between Corby Hall and Corby Hall School, so that "an interchange of letters was necessary after each of the postman's rounds," according to Jesuit archives.

Just a year later, in 1937, the name of the school was changed yet again, to Sunderland Catholic College, and in 1939 it became Corby School. The dedication of both Corby School and Corby Hall recalled, according to the Jesuit archives, the historical association of Sunderland with Father Ralph Corby who was captured by Puritans in 1644 and hanged. The name Corby School lasted until 1948 when the Jesuits left and handed running of the school over to the Christian Brothers of Ireland.

It was renamed as St Aidan's RC Grammar School and remained a grammar school until 1973, when a new school block and gymnasium building was completed on the opposite side of Ashbrooke Road and linked to the old school site by a tunnel. At this date the school was reclassified as a comprehensive school, although the last 'grammar school' pupils took their O-levels in 1975. St Aidan's retained the Briery building for use by the sixth form. Ashbrooke House was used as a retreat by the Brothers for many years, but was sold off in the 1970s and demolished to make way for flats.

In April 2013, St Aidan's Catholic School was converted to an academy and renamed St Aidan's Catholic Academy.

In April 2024, plans were submitted to demolish the 1970s and 2000s buildings to replace them. As of October 2025, a large portion of the school has been demolished and preparation works have commenced.

== Houses and uniform ==
St Aidan's has forms into which each year is divided. The forms, which form houses are: Aquin and Bede making Ashbrooke House, Corby and Fisher making Corby House and More, David and Rice making Brookfield House. The school is split into two main buildings: the main school, which caters mainly for boys up to Year 11, and the Briery, which housed the Sixth Form until the Sixth Form joined with sister school St Anthony's under one umbrella.

== Controversy ==
In 2016, an ex-pupil of St Aidan's school was paid £17,000 compensation by the Congregation of Christian Brothers after claiming two members of the Christian Brothers abused him at school in the 1960s. Other ex-pupils have come forward and made similar claims.

== Notable former pupils/teachers ==
- Frank Cook MP - Politician
- Tom Coyne – Broadcaster
- Kevin Dillon – former Portsmouth, Newcastle United, and Birmingham City footballer.
- Dennis Donnini VC – recipient of the Victoria Cross
- Mike Elliott – actor
- David Ferguson – professional footballer
- Lee Howey - former Premier League footballer for Sunderland
- Steve Howey - former Premier League footballer for Newcastle United and an England international
