= Dennis Donnini =

British soldier & VC recipient (1925-1945)

Dennis Donnini VC
- Born: 17 November 1925; Easington Colliery, County Durham, England
- Died: 18 January 1945 (aged 19); Selfkant, Nazi Germany
- Burial place: Sittard War Cemetery, Netherlands
- Military career
- Allegiance: United Kingdom
- Branch: British Army
- Service years: 1944–1945
- Rank: Fusilier
- Service number: 14768011
- Units: Royal Scots Fusiliers
- Conflicts: World War II: Western Front; Western Allied invasion of Germany; Operation Blackcock †
- Awards: Victoria Cross

Fusilier Dennis Donnini VC (17 November 1925 – 18 January 1945) was an English recipient of the Victoria Cross, the highest and most prestigious award for gallantry in the face of the enemy that can be awarded to British and Commonwealth forces.

== Early life ==
Dennis Donnini was born to Italian-born Alfred Donnini and his English wife Catherine (née Brown), on 17 November 1925 in Easington Colliery. His father owned an ice cream parlour in Easington and attended Corby Grammar School in Sunderland, now known as St. Aidans School. Before he enlisted, Donnini had two brothers enter the military. Alfred Donnini was captured at Dunkirk and spent the rest of the war in a POW camp, while Lewis Donnini died of wounds on 1 May 1944.

== Details ==
Donnini was 19 years old, and a fusilier in the 4th/5th Battalion, Royal Scots Fusiliers, British Army during the Second World War when the following deed took place for which he was awarded the VC.

On 18 January 1945 during Operation Blackcock, Fusilier Donnini's platoon was ordered to attack the small village of Stein in Selfkant Germany, close to the Dutch border. On leaving their trench they immediately came under heavy fire from a house and Fusilier Donnini was hit in the head. After recovering consciousness he charged 30 yards down the open road and hurled a grenade through the nearest window, whereupon the enemy fled pursued by Fusilier Donnini and the survivors of his platoon. He was wounded a second time, but continued firing his Bren gun until he was killed after the grenade he was carrying was hit by a bullet and exploded. His gallantry had enabled his comrades to overcome twice their own number of the enemy.

Donnini at 19 was the youngest soldier in the Second World War to be awarded the VC.

He is buried at the Commonwealth Cemetery in Sittard, The Netherlands.

Donnini is commemorated in the song "Donnini Doolally" by Easington singer Jez Lowe on his album Doolally.

== See also ==
- British VCs of World War 2 (John Laffin, 1997)
- Monuments to Courage (David Harvey, 1999)
- The Register of the Victoria Cross (This England, 1997)
