= Wellfield School =

Location
- North Road East; Wingate; County Durham, TS28 5AX; England; 54.73133°N 1.37729°W

Information
- Type: Academy
- Local authority: Durham County Council
- Trust: New College Durham Academies Trust
- Department for Education URN: 149739 Tables
- Ofsted: Reports
- Headteacher: Louise Colquhoun
- Gender: Coeducational
- Age: 11 to 16
- Enrolment: 1,066 as of May 2025
- Website: wellfieldschool.net

Wellfield School is a coeducational secondary school located in Wingate, County Durham, England.

== History ==
The original school was opened by Councillor Peter Lee JP on Saturday 22 March 1930. The school was named The A.J Dawson Secondary School after the Director of Education who was well known in the area as he often visited schools. In subsequent years and reflecting changes to educational policy the school has been known as A.J Dawson Grammar School, Wellfield A. J Dawson Grammar School, Wellfield Comprehensive School, Wellfield Community School and now simply Wellfield School.

Wellfield Comprehensive School started as an amalgamation of three schools, Wellfield Grammar School (previously AJ Dawson), Wingate Secondary Modern School and Wheatley Hill Secondary Modern School. Then Yoden Hall School closed in the 1980s and pupils and staff from this school also joined Wellfield.

Wellfield has been judged as a “Good” school by Ofsted in 2014 and 2018.

Previously a community school administered by Durham County Council, in June 2023 Wellfield School converted to academy status. The school is now part of New College Durham Academies Trust.

=== Wingate Secondary School Headteachers ===
Mr W A Moyes	1963	1973
Mr D Haigh	1973	1980

=== A J Dawson Grammar School Headteachers ===
Mr J Ingram, BSC	1930	1946
Mr G A Carr, MC, MA	1946	1959
Mr S Stewart, MA	1959	1971
Mr T H Dennis, BSC	1972	1980

=== Wheatley Hill Secondary School Headteachers ===
Mr A Harris, MBE	1953	1975
Mr E Ward	1975	1978
Mr G Adams	1978	1980

=== Wellfield School Headteachers ===
Mr T H Dennis, BSC	1980	1985
Mr G B McHugh	1985	1989
Dr J Jordan, BEd, PhD	1990	2000
Mrs J F Elliott, BA, NPQH	2000	2011
Mrs L Rodham, MA, NPQH	2012	2021
Mr G Potts (Acting)	2021	2022
Ms S Hammond	2022	2023
Mrs L Colquhoun	Current	

== Academics ==
Wellfield School offers GCSEs and BTECs as programmes of study for pupils.
