= Wingate, County Durham =

Coordinates: 54°44′06″N 1°22′48″W

Wingate
- Village
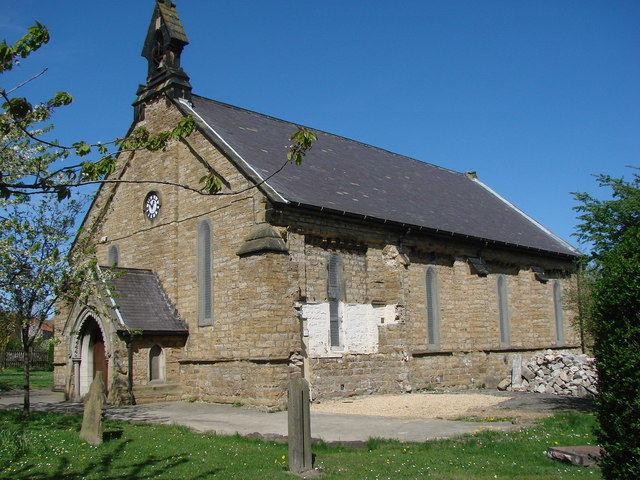
- Holy Trinity Church, Wingate

- Location within County Durham
- Population: 4,168 (2011 census)
- OS grid reference: NZ400379
- Unitary authority: County Durham
- Ceremonial county: Durham
- Region: North East
- Country: England
- Sovereign state: United Kingdom
- Post town: WINGATE
- Postcode district: TS28
- Dialling code: 01429
- Police: Durham
- Fire: County Durham and Darlington
- Ambulance: North East
- UK Parliament: Easington

Wingate is a village in County Durham, England.

Wingate is a former pit village with a mixture of 19th-century, post-war, and more recent housing developments. It was originally inhabited by around 30 farmers before 1839 when coal was discovered. It is located in the East of County Durham, three miles south west of Peterlee, and seven miles north west of Hartlepool. As with most villages in the area, it grew rapidly with the development of coal-mining in the region.

The name Wingate is said to derive from the Anglo-Saxon words windig (windy) and geat (road) meaning windy road. Like many County Durham villages, residents are known to speak the pitmatic dialect, described to be a mixture of both mackem and teesside accents, although new housing developments has seen a sharp increase in the village's population.

== History ==
There is no evidence of settlement at Wingate until the 16th century. However, mining made its presence felt in the 19th century and Wingate became a large settlement and regional centre for the area. The village is located approximately two miles east of the original settlement, which is now called Old Wingate. Coal was discovered in 1839 when two shafts were sunk; coal was drawn in December 1839. In 1906, an explosion in the mine killed 26 pit workers in Wingate, and in 2006 a march took place to commemorate the miners.

On 7 January 1971, Avro Vulcan bomber XM610 crashed near the school after suffering an engine fire due to metal fatigue in the number 1 engine. The pilot remained in the burning aircraft before he ejected to direct the aircraft to crash into the sea; however, the aircraft later spiralled down into the village and crashed, leaving a large crater. There were no fatalities in the accident. The pilot was awarded the AFC for his attempts to save the aircraft.

Wingate is also the birthplace of Ted Harrison, a Canadian artist notable for his paintings of the Yukon.

== Governance ==
An electoral ward in the same name exists. This ward stretches north east to Peterlee and has a total population, taken at the 2011 census, of 10,302.

== Transport ==
=== Car travel ===
The village has ready access to road links for commuters, with the A181 leading westward to Durham and then north and south via the A1. Heading east towards the east Durham coast leads to the A19, with links to Peterlee, Sunderland and Teesside. The main road through the village is the B1280.

=== Public transport ===
Public transport is provided by Arriva North East and Go North East. Buses serve a range of destinations including: Sedgefield, Durham, Hartlepool, Middlesbrough, Peterlee and Stockton-on-Tees

Wingate was previously served by two railway stations at Wingate and Wellfield on the Great North of England, Clarence and Hartlepool Junction Railway and the North Eastern Railway Castle Eden Branch respectively. Both stations are long closed and the majority of the former right of way has been reclaimed and turned into walkways, notably parts of the Hart to Haswell Walkway. One of the level crossing gates survives next to the Railway Crossings pub on Front Street.

== See also ==
- Wellfield School, in Wingate
