= Thornley, Weardale =

Village in Durham, England

Coordinates: 54.729°N 1.821°W

Thornley
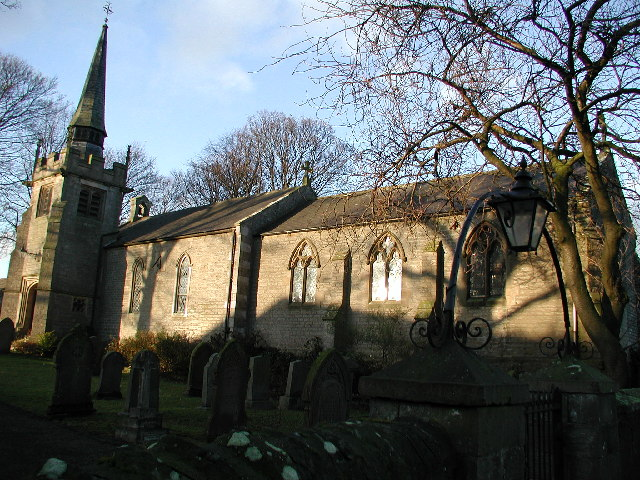
- St Bartholomew's parish church

- Location within County Durham
- Population: 184 (2001)
- OS grid reference: NZ116372
- Civil parish: Wolsingham
- Unitary authority: County Durham
- Ceremonial county: County Durham
- Region: North East
- Country: England
- Sovereign state: United Kingdom
- Post town: BISHOP AUCKLAND
- Postcode district: DL13
- Dialling code: 01429
- Police: Durham
- Fire: County Durham and Darlington
- Ambulance: North East
- UK Parliament: North West Durham

Thornley is a village in Weardale, County Durham, England, about 1 mile (1.6 km) south of Tow Law. In 2001 it had a population of 184.
