= Jez Lowe =

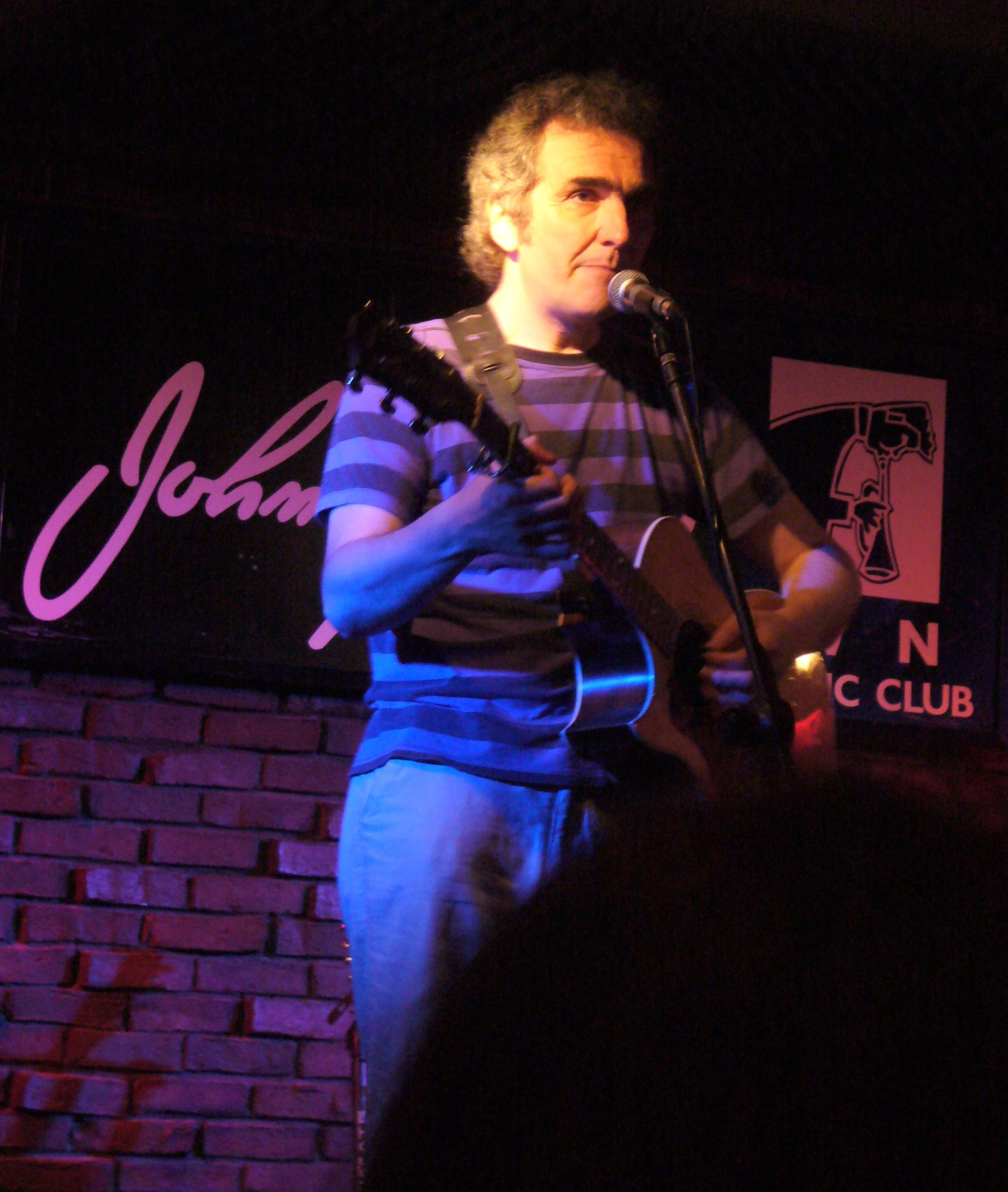
- Lowe on stage in 2011

Background information
- Born: John Gerard Lowe; 14 July 1955 (age 71); Easington Colliery, County Durham, England
- Occupations: Folk singer and songwriter
- Instruments: guitar, harmonica, cittern, piano, mandolin
- Years active: c. 1979–present
- Labels: Green Linnet, Fellside, Tantobie
- Website: jezlowe.com

John Gerard "Jez" Lowe (born 14 July 1955) is an English folk singer-songwriter. Lowe was born and raised in County Durham, in a family with Irish roots. He is known primarily for his compositions dealing with daily life in North-East England, particularly in his hometown of Easington Colliery. He attended St Francis RC Grammar School in nearby Hartlepool and later studied languages at Sunderland Polytechnic. He performs both as a solo artist and with his backing band, The Bad Pennies. In addition to singing his songs, Lowe accompanies himself and The Bad Pennies on guitar, harmonica, cittern, and piano.

== Songwriting ==
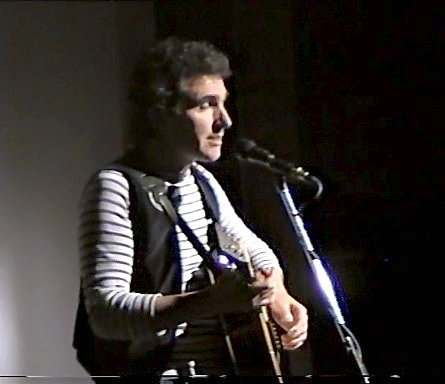
Lowe on stage in Hobart, Australia in 1997

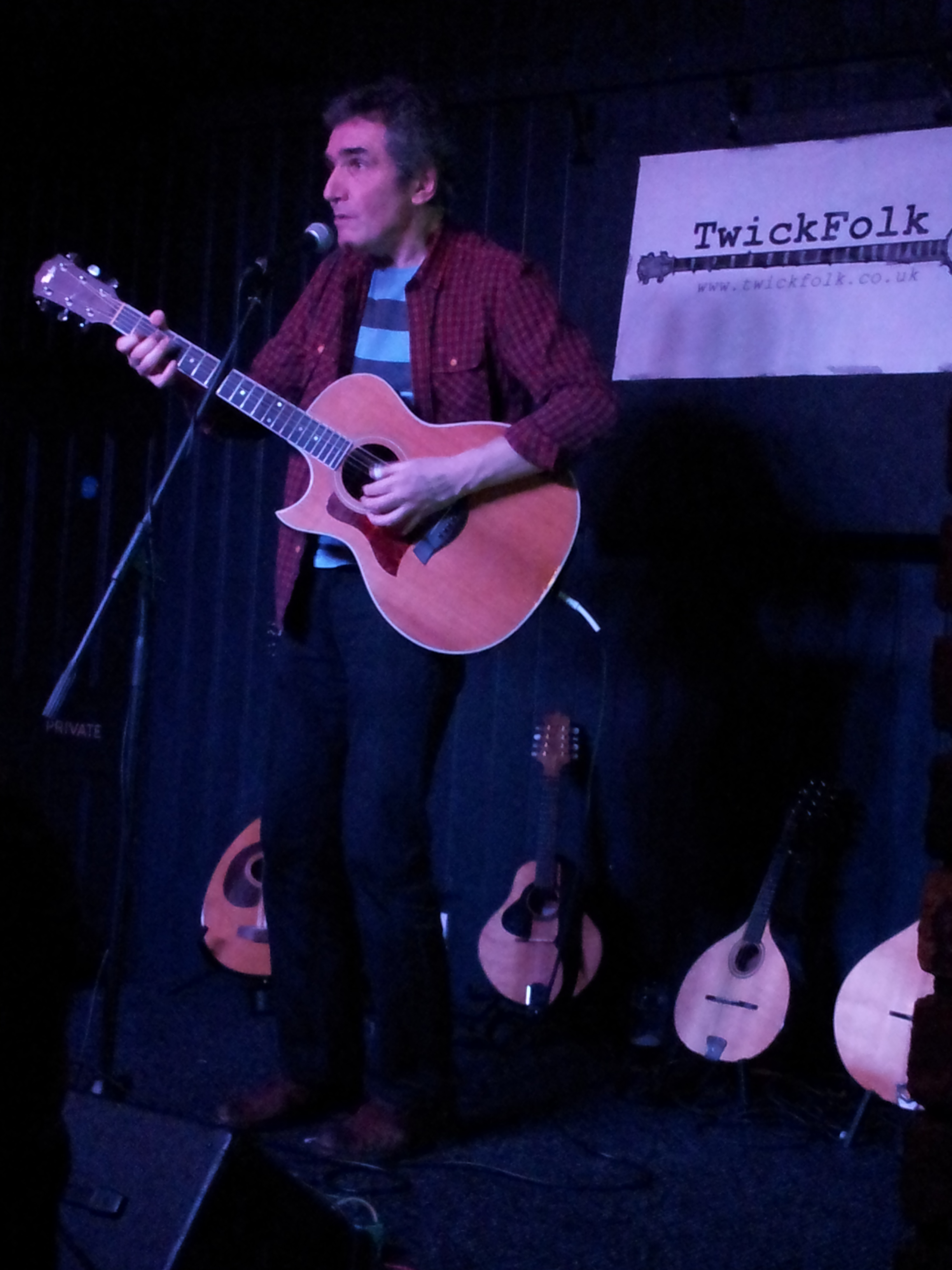
Jez Lowe performing at TwickFolk, February 2015

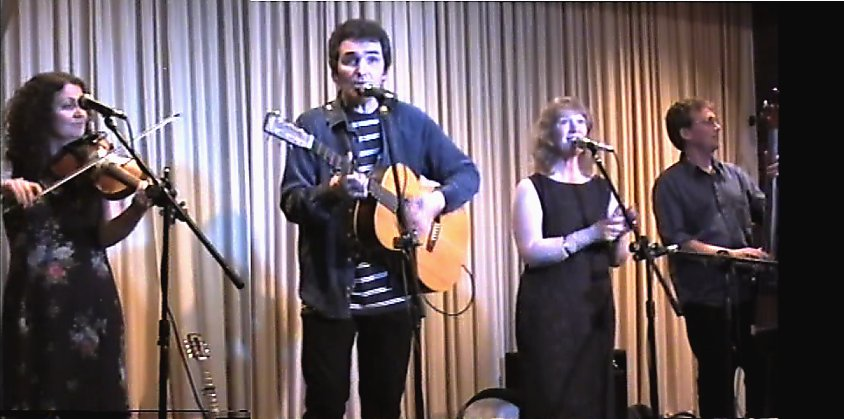
Jez Lowe and the Bad Pennies in Hobart, Australia in 2002. L-R: L-R: Kate Bramley, fiddle; Jez Lowe; Judy Dinning (vocals, percussion); Simon Howarth (electric double bass, keyboards, vocals).

John Gerard Lowe grew up witnessing the decline of the coal-mining industry that had defined the region's economic profile for generations. A great many of Lowe's compositions address the economic distress that the North Country has suffered as a result of this industrial decline, and the social repercussions thereof. "Galloways," "Nearer to Nettles," and "These Coal Town Days" are among the songs that directly address economic conditions. In the much larger category of social impact songs, well known Lowe compositions are "Big Meeting Day," "Greek Lightning," and "Last of the Widows." (His song, "Last of the Widows", was written in 1991 to mark the fortieth anniversary of the pit disaster at Easington Colliery.) Numerous other songs by Lowe deal with the general issues of poverty and limited social opportunity in the region. Amongst those who have recorded Jez Lowe songs are Fairport Convention, The Dubliners, The Unthanks, The Tannahill Weavers, The Young Uns, Bob Fox, Megson, The McCalmans, Liam Clancy, Cherish The Ladies, The Black Family, Tom McConville, Enda Kenny, Men of the Deeps and many more.

== Recent projects ==
In 2006, Lowe contributed to the BBC Radio 2 Radio Ballads documentary series broadcast on Radio 2 as a homage to the original series of the same title, pioneered by Ewan MacColl and Charles Parker in the late 1950s and early 1960s. Jez Lowe was commissioned to write 22 new songs for the documentary-folk series, which were not all performed by Lowe but featured guest vocals from the likes of Barry Coope, Bob Fox and many more. The series went on to win two Sony Radio Academy Awards.

In 2008, Lowe was nominated as 'Folksinger of the Year' in the BBC Radio 2 Folk Awards, but ultimately lost the category to young Scottish singer and instrumentalist Julie Fowlis.

In 2015, Lowe received two nominations for the BBC Folk Awards, as Folksinger of the Year and for Song of the Year ("The Pitmen Poets"), but again failed to win in either category. He was on tour in Canada at the time of the ceremony, with James Keelaghan and Archie Fisher, under the trio-name "Men at Words".

He has an on-going working partnership with guitarist/singer-songwriter Steve Tilston, which sees them do thirty-plus concerts together every year, and which resulted in the album The Janus Game in 2016, consisting entirely of new songs written by Tilston and Lowe in collaboration. Lowe's long-time partnership with Canadian songwriter James Keelaghan also continues, with a joint tour of Canada lined up for 2024. A "live" album by the pair, recorded in Australia in 2002, was released in 2017.

Since 2011, he has been part of a quartet known as The Pitmen Poets, alongside Benny Graham, Billy Mitchell and Bob Fox. They have toured extensively every few years around the UK, and have released three albums of songs about the coal mining communities of North east England.

In January 2018, Lowe published his first novel, The Dillen Doll, through the independent publisher Badapple Books. The story of the novel includes many references to traditional North East of England folk songs, many of which are included on a CD, also called The Dillen Doll, presented as a continuous "suite" of music and songs which culminates in the song "Dol Li A", upon which the story is based. A second novel, The Corly Croons, was published in 2019, and a third, Piper's Lonnen, in 2022, together with a 5-track CD of songs and pipe-tunes mentioned in the book, featuring long-time collaborator Andy May on Northumbrian Pipes. Lowe's fourth novel, The Keeker Seam, was published in May 2024, and features many references to the coal-mining songs of North East England as part of its narrative. Several of these, plus a newly composed song also entitled "The Keeker Seam", were recorded by Lowe and are available as downloads from his website. As with the previous two books, the character of Evan Piper is central to the story.

The final series of the BBC Radio Ballads, The Ballad of The Great War, came to an end in November 2018. This series has featured more than a dozen Jez Lowe songs (bringing it to a total of over fifty of his songs that have been used since the "new" radio Ballads project began in 2006). Lowe also provided the lyrics to John Tams's theme music for this series, entitled "The Cherry-Cheeked Optimists", from episodes two to five. An off-shoot from the Radio Ballads, a project called The Ballads of Child Migration, also features three Jez Lowe songs and was released on CD in 2015. Two further songs were composed by Jez for inclusion in a BBC Radio Two production of Michael Morpurgo's book Alone on a Wide, Wide Sea in 2017, which is linked to the Child Migration project.

== Broadcasting ==
As well as the BBC Radio Ballads series, Lowe has also made several broadcasts for BBC radio, starting with a series of five programmes in 1999 called A Song For Geordie, which he scripted and introduced. It was a comprehensive introduction to the many aspects of folk music from North East England, and included interviews with Ed Pickford, Benny Graham, Vin Garbutt, Mark Knopfler, Annie Fentiman, Terri Freeman and others. One programme from this series was re-broadcast on BBC 6 Music in 2018. He has also been guest presenter on the BBC Radio 4 series Open Country, for a programme about Tynemouth in 2017, a Hallowe'en special in 2021, a programme to commemorate the 1932 "mass-trespass" on Kinder Scout, a mountain in the Peak District, in January 2023, and a programme about a journey taken by 18th century Northumbrian piper Jamie Allen across North Yorkshire.

== Albums ==
Note: All of Jez Lowe's albums have been released on CD with the exception of his self-titled debut album from 1980. However, the contents of that entire album are available as bonus tracks in the CD reissues of The Old Durham Road and Galloways

Jez Lowe

- Oubliette (2025)
- Piper's Lonnen (2022) a 5 track CD in collaboration with Andy May of songs and tunes mentioned in Jez's third novel.
- The Fellside Collection (2021) a 5-CD box set of all his recordings for the Fellside label from 1980 to 1993, with additional bonus/unreleased tracks.
- Crazy Pagan (2020)
- The Dillen Doll (2018)
- The Janus Game (2016) a collaboration with Steve Tilston
- The Ballad Beyond (2014)
- Heads Up: 18 Essential Jez Lowe Songs (2012)
- Jack Common's Anthem (2007)
- Back Shift: a collection of songs from 1980 to 1986 (1992) [17 tracks. 14 previously released and 3 are live/alternative versions of previously released songs]
- Bad Penny (1988)
- Galloways Fellside FE 049 (1985)
- The Old Durham Road Fellside FE 034 (1983)
- Jez Lowe Fellside FE 023 (1980)

Jez Lowe and the Bad Pennies

- Snow Dancing (2023)
- Cauld Feet Again, Pet - limited edition Christmas album (2015)
- Wotcheor! (2010)
- Northern Echoes: Live on the Tyne (2008) (two discs – CD live Feb. 2008; DVD live Nov. 2007)
- Doolally (2004)
- Honesty Box (2002)
- Live at the Davy Lamp (2000)
- The Parish Notices (1998)
- Tenterhooks (1995)
- Bede Weeps (1993)
- Briefly on the Street (1990)

CD reissues with additional tracks

- The Parish Notices (Green Linnet 1998 CD)
  - Reissue: The Parish Notices – The Art Edition Tantobie 2003, with 3 previously unreleased tracks
- Tenterhooks (Green Linnet 1995 CD)
  - Reissue: Tenterhooks – The Art Edition Tantobie 2005, with six bonus tracks from the 1994 album Banners
- Bad Penny (Fellside 1988 LP)
  - Reissues: In the US (1995) on Firebird CD and in the UK (1996) on Fellside CD 1995. Includes an extra track recorded in 1988, but left off the original LP release.
- Two A Roue (Fellside 1986 LP)
  - Reissue: Tantobie CD 2001 with 3 extra tracks recorded in 2001.
- Galloways (Fellside 1985 LP)
  - Reissue: Musica Pangaea CD 1996 USA, with 6 additional tracks, being Side A of the Jez Lowe album, 1980
- The Old Durham Road (Fellside 1983 LP)
  - Reissue: Fellside CD 1999 with 5 additional tracks, being Side B of the Jez Lowe album, 1980

Collaborative albums

- The Ballad of Child Migration Delphonic Records (2015)
- Banners: Music For East Durham – Jez Lowe and Easington District Musicians (1994)
- Jake Walton & Jez Lowe – Two A Roue Fellside FE 055 (1986)

Other connected albums

- Kate Bramley – Fighting The Tide: a play by Kate Bramley (2002) (all 12 songs written by Jez Lowe)

DVDs

- Sight Rhymes – Jez Lowe & the Bad Pennies (2007)
