= List of schools in County Durham =

This is a list of schools in County Durham, England (Durham County Council area).

== State-funded schools ==
=== Primary schools ===
- Acre Rigg Academy, Peterlee
- Acre Rigg Infant School, Peterlee
- All Saints RC Primary school, Lanchester
- Annfield Plain Infant School, Annfield Plain
- Annfield Plain Junior School, Annfield Plain
- Aycliffe Village Primary School, Newton Aycliffe
- Beamish Primary school, Beamish
- Bearpark Primary school, Bearpark
- Belmont Cheveley Park Primary School, Durham
- Belmont CE Primary School, Durham
- Benfieldside Primary School, Consett
- Bishop Ian Ramsey CE Primary School, Medomsley
- Blackhall Primary School, Blackhall Colliery
- Blessed John Duckett RC Primary School, Tow Law
- Bloemfontein Primary School, Stanley
- Blue Coat CE Junior School, Durham
- Bluebell Meadow Primary School, Trimdon
- Bournmoor Primary school, Bournmoor
- Bowburn Primary School, Bowburn
- Bowes Hutchinson's CE School, Bowes
- Brandon Primary School, Brandon
- Broom Cottages Primary School, Ferryhill
- Browney Primary Academy, Browney
- Bullion Lane Primary School Chester-le-Street
- Burnhope Primary School, Burnhope
- Burnopfield Primary School, Burnopfield
- Butterknowle Primary School, Butterknowle
- Byerley Park Primary School, Newton Aycliffe
- Byers Green Primary School, Byers Green
- Cassop Primary School, Cassop
- Castleside Primary School, Castleside
- Catchgate Primary School, Annfield Plain
- Cestria Primary School, Chester-le-Street
- Chester le Street CE Primary School, Chester-le-Street
- Chilton Academy, Chilton
- Cleves Cross Primary and Nursery Academy, Ferryhill
- Cockfield Primary School, Cockfield
- Cockton Hill Infant School, Bishop Auckland
- Cockton Hill Junior School, Bishop Auckland
- Collierley Primary School, Dipton
- Consett Infant School, Consett
- Consett Junior School, Consett
- Copeland Road Primary School, West Auckland
- Cotherstone Primary School, Cotherstone
- Cotsford Primary School, Horden
- Coxhoe Primary School, Coxhoe
- Crook Primary School, Crook
- Deaf Hill Primary School, Deaf Hill
- Dean Bank Primary School, Ferryhill
- Delves Lane Primary School, Consett
- Dene House Primary School, Peterlee
- Durham Gilesgate Primary School, Durham
- Easington CE Primary School, Easington
- Easington Colliery Primary School, Easington Colliery
- East Stanley School, Stanley
- Ebchester CE Primary School, Ebchester
- Edmondsley Primary School, Edmondsley
- Escomb Primary School, Escomb
- Esh CE Primary School, Esh
- Esh Winning Primary School, Esh Winning
- Etherley Lane Primary School, Bishop Auckland
- Evenwood CE Primary School Evenwood
- Ferryhill Station Primary School, Ferryhill
- Finchale Primary School, Durham
- Fishburn Primary School, Fishburn
- Framwellgate Moor Primary School, Durham
- Frosterley Primary School Frosterley
- Gainford CE Primary School, Gainford
- Green Lane CE Primary School, Barnard Castle
- Greenland Community Primary School, South Moor
- The Grove Primary School, Consett
- Hamsterley Primary School, Hamsterley
- Hartside Primary Academy, Crook
- Hesleden Primary School, Hesleden
- Howden-le-Wear Primary School, Howden-le-Wear
- Howletch Lane Primary School, Peterlee
- Hunwick Primary School, Hunwick
- Hutton Henry CE Primary School, Hutton Henry
- Ingleton CE Primary School, Ingleton
- Kelloe Primary School, Kelloe
- King Street Primary School, Spennymoor
- Kirk Merrington Primary School, Kirk Merrington
- Lanchester Parochial Primary School, Lanchester
- Langley Moor Primary School, Langley Moor
- Langley Park Primary School, Langley Park
- Laurel Avenue Community Primary School, Durham
- Leadgate Primary School, Leadgate
- Ludworth Primary School, Ludworth
- Lumley Infant and Nursery School, Great Lumley
- Lumley Junior School, Great Lumley
- Middlestone Moor Primary Academy, Spennymoor
- Middleton-in-Teesdale Primary School, Middleton-in-Teesdale
- Montalbo Primary School, Barnard Castle
- Moorside Primary Academy, Consett
- Nettlesworth Primary School, Nettlesworth
- Neville's Cross Primary School, Durham
- New Brancepeth Primary Academy, New Brancepeth
- New Seaham Academy, Seaham
- Newker Primary School, Chester-le-Street
- Newton Hall Infants' School, Durham
- North Park Primary School, Spennymoor
- Oakley Cross Primary School, West Auckland
- Our Lady & St Joseph's RC Primary School, Leadgate
- Our Lady and St Joseph's RC Primary School, Ushaw Moor
- Our Lady & St Thomas RC Primary School, Willington
- Our Lady of Lourdes RC Primary School, Shotton Colliery
- Our Lady of the Rosary RCVA Primary School, Peterlee
- Our Lady Star of the Sea RC Primary School, Horden
- Ouston Primary School, Ouston
- Peases West Primary School, Billy Row
- Pelton Community Primary School, Pelton
- Pittington Primary School, Pittington
- Prince Bishop's Community Primary School, Close House
- Ramshaw Primary School, Evenwood
- Red Rose Primary School, Chester-le-Street
- Ribbon School, Murton
- Ropery Walk Primary School, Seaham
- Rosa Street Primary School, Spennymoor
- Roseberry Primary and Nursery School, Pelton
- Sacriston Academy, Sacriston
- Seascape Primary School, Peterlee
- St Andrew's Academy WISE, Bishop Auckland
- St Anne's CE Primary School, Bishop Auckland
- St Bede's RC Primary School, Sacriston
- St Benet's RC Primary School, Ouston
- St Chad's RC Primary School, Witton Park
- St Charles' RC Primary School, Spennymoor
- St Cuthbert's RC Primary School, Chester-le-Street
- St Cuthbert's RC Primary School, Crook
- St Cuthbert's RC Primary School, Seaham
- St Francis Horndale CE Primary School, Newton Aycliffe
- St Godric's RC Primary School, Durham
- St Godric's RC Primary School, Wheatley Hill
- St Helen Auckland Community Primary School, St Helen Auckland
- St Hild's College CE Primary School, Durham
- St John's Chapel Primary School, St John's Chapel
- St John's CE Primary School, Shildon
- St Joseph's RC Primary School, Blackhall Colliery
- St Joseph's RC Primary School, Coundon
- St Joseph's RC Primary School, Durham
- St Joseph's RC Primary School, Murton
- St Joseph's RC Primary School, Newton Aycliffe
- St Joseph's RC Primary School, Stanley
- St Margaret's CE Primary School, Durham
- St Mary Magdalen's RC Primary School, Seaham
- St Mary's RC Primary School, Barnard Castle
- St Mary's RC Primary School, Consett
- St Mary's RC Primary School, Newton Aycliffe
- St Mary's RC Primary School, Stanley
- St Mary's RC Primary School, Wingate
- St Michael's CE Primary School, Bishop Middleham
- St Michael's RC Primary School, Esh
- St Oswald's CE Primary and Nursery School, Durham
- St Patrick's RC Primary School, Consett
- St Patrick's RC Primary School, Dipton
- St Patrick's RC Primary School, Langley Moor
- St Pius X RC Primary School, Consett
- St Stephen's CE Primary School, Willington
- St Thomas More RC Primary School, Durham
- St Wilfrid's RC Primary School, Bishop Auckland
- St William's RC Primary School, Trimdon
- Seaham Trinity Primary School, Seaham
- Seascape Primary School, Peterlee
- Seaview Primary School, Deneside
- Sedgefield Hardwick Primary Academy, Sedgefield
- Sedgefield Primary School, Sedgefield
- Sherburn Primary school, Sherburn
- Shield Row Primary School, Shield Row
- Shincliffe CE Primary School, High Shincliffe
- Shotley Bridge Primary School, Shotley Bridge
- Shotton Hall Primary School, Peterlee
- Shotton Primary School, Shotton Colliery
- Silver Tree Primary School and Nursery, Ushaw Moor
- South Hetton Primary, South Hetton
- South Stanley Infant and Nursery School, South Stanley
- South Stanley Junior School, South Stanley
- Springmoor Grange Primary School, Spennymoor
- Staindrop CE Primary School, Staindrop
- Stanhope Barrington CE Primary School, Stanhope
- Stanley Crook Primary School, Stanley Crook
- Stanley Burnside Primary School, South Stanley
- Stephenson Way Academy, Newton Aycliffe
- Sugar Hill Primary School, Newton Aycliffe
- Sunnybrow Primary School, Crook
- Tanfield Lea Community Primary School, Tanfield Lea
- Thornhill Primary School, Shildon
- Thornley Primary School, Thornley
- Timothy Hackworth Primary School, Shildon
- Toft Hill Primary School, Toft Hill
- Tow Law Millennium Primary School, Tow Law
- Tudhoe Colliery Primary School, Tudhoe
- Vane Road Primary School, Newton Aycliffe
- Victoria Lane Academy, Coundon
- Wearhead Primary School, Wearhead
- West Cornforth Primary School, West Cornforth
- West Pelton Primary School, West Pelton
- West Rainton Primary School, West Rainton
- Westlea Primary School, Seaham
- Wheatley Hill Community Primary School, Wheatley Hill
- Willington Primary School, Willington
- Wingate Primary School, Wingate
- Witton Gilbert Primary School, Witton Gilbert
- Witton-le-Wear Primary School, Witton-le-Wear
- Wolsingham Primary School, Wolsingham
- Woodham Burn Community Primary School, Newton Aycliffe
- Woodhouse Community Primary School, Bishop Auckland
- Woodland Primary School, Woodland
- Woodlea Primary School, Fence Houses
- Yohden Primary School, Horden

=== Secondary schools ===
- Belmont Community School, Durham
- Bishop Barrington Academy, Bishop Auckland
- Consett Academy, Consett
- Dene Academy, Peterlee
- Durham Academy, Ushaw Moor
- Durham Johnston Comprehensive School, Durham
- Easington Academy, Easington
- Ferryhill Business and Enterprise College, Ferryhill
- Framwellgate School Durham, Durham
- Greenfield Academy, Newton Aycliffe
- Hermitage Academy, Chester-le-Street
- King James I Academy, Bishop Auckland
- North Durham Academy, Stanley
- Park View School, Chester-le-Street
- Parkside Academy, Willington
- St Bede's Catholic School, Lanchester
- St Bede's Catholic School, Peterlee
- St John's Catholic School, Bishop Auckland
- St Leonard's Catholic School, Durham
- Seaham School of Technology, Seaham
- Sedgefield Community College, Sedgefield
- Shotton Hall Academy, Peterlee
- Staindrop Academy, Staindrop
- Tanfield School, Stanley
- Teesdale School, Barnard Castle
- UTC South Durham, Newton Aycliffe
- Wellfield School, Wingate
- Whitworth Park Academy, Spennymoor
- Wolsingham School, Wolsingham
- Woodham Academy, Newton Aycliffe

=== Special and alternative schools ===
- Croft Community School, Annfield Plain
- Durham Trinity School, Durham
- Elemore Hall School, Pittington
- Endeavour Academy Durham, Peterlee
- Evergreen Primary School, Bishop Auckland
- Hope Wood Academy, Easington Colliery
- The Meadows School, Spennymoor
- The Oaks Secondary School, Spennymoor
- Villa Real School, Consett
- Walworth School, Newton Aycliffe
- The Woodlands, Ferryhill

=== Further education ===
- Bishop Auckland College
- Derwentside College, Lanchester
- Durham Sixth Form Centre, Durham
- East Durham College, Durham
- New College Durham

== Independent schools ==
=== Primary and preparatory schools ===
- The Independent Grammar School, Durham

=== Senior and all-through schools ===
- Barnard Castle School, Barnard Castle
- Durham High School, Durham
- Durham School, Durham

=== Special and alternative schools ===
- Delta Independent School, Consett
- The Grange Learning Centre, Low Willington
- Highcroft School, Bishop Auckland
- North East Centre for Autism - Aycliffe School, Newton Aycliffe

=== Further education ===
- Thornbeck College

== Former schools ==
If merged the unused site or name is listed here.

=== Former primary schools ===
- Benfieldside Junior School, Consett. Moved to infant site to form Benfieldside Primary School.
- Camden Square Infant School, Seaham. Now Part of Seaham Trinity Primary School.
- Dene Valley Primary School, Dene Valley. Merged with Eldon Lane Primary School to form Prince Bishops Primary School.
- Eden Hall Infant School, Peterlee
- Eden Hall Junior School, Peterlee. Merged with the infants and relocated to form Seascape Primary School
- Eldon Lane Primary School, Coronation. Merged with Dene Valley Primary School to form Prince Bishops Prumary School
- Elmfield Primary School, Newton Aycliffe. Closed down.
- Forest Of Teesedale Primary School, Forest-in-Teesdale. Closed Down.
- Hamsteels Primary School, Esh Winning. Closed Down.
- Haswell Primary School, Haswell. Closed Down.
- Murton Primary School, Murton. Merged Murton Jubilee Primary on their site to form Ribbon Academy
- North Blunts Primary School, Peterlee
- North Road Junior School, Spennymoor. Merged with Bessemer Green Infants on their site to form North Park Primary School.
- Parkside Infant School, Seaham. Now Part of Seaham Trinity Primary School.
- Plawsworth Road Infant School, Sacriston. Closed Down.
- Princess Road Junior School, Seaham. Now Part of Seaham Trinity Primary School.
- Rookhope Primary School, Rookhope. Closed Down.
- Satley Primary School, Satley. Closed Down.
- Sherburn Hill Primary School, Sherburn Hill. Merged with Sherburn Village Primary School on their site.
- Startforth Morritt Memorial Primary School, Startforth. Closed Down.
- Trimdon Grange Infant School, Trimdon Grange. Was split site in Bluebell Meadow Primary School until all pupils moved to the old Junior School building.
- Trimdon Village Infants School, Trimdon. Closed Down.
- Westwood Primary School, High Westwood. Closed Down.

=== Former secondary schools ===
- The Avenue Comprehensive School, Newton Aycliffe
- Consett Community Sports College, Consett. Merged with Moorside Community Technology College in 2011 to become Consett Academy
- Fyndoune Community College, Sacriston. Merged with Durham Academy in 2021.
- Gilesgate Sports College, Gilesgate
- Greencroft Business and Enterprise Community School, Annfield Plain. Merged with Stanley School of Technology in 2011 to become North Durham Academy. The site is now occupied by Croft Community Special School.
- Lansdowne Comprehensive School, Bowburn and Coxhoe. Closed 1984.
- Moorside Community Technology College, Moorside. Merged with Consett Community Sports College in 2011 to become Consett Academy
- Roseberry College, Newfield. Closed 2014.
- Stanley School of Technology, Stanley. Merged with Greencroft Business and Enterprise Community School in 2011 to become North Durham Academy.
- Sunndydale Community College, Shildon. Merged with Greenfield School in 2014.
- Tudhoe Grange School, Spennymoor. Merged with Spennymoor School to become Whitworth Park Academy in the old Spennymoor School buildings.
- Yohden Hall School, Blackhall Colliery
