= Blenkiron =

Blenkiron is a surname of British origin. It is one of several variant toponymic surnames from the village of Blencarn in Cumberland, England.

Notable people with the surname include:

- Alfred Blenkiron (1896–1920), British World War I flying ace
- Bill Blenkiron (born 1942), English cricketer
- Darren Blenkiron (born 1974), English cricketer
- Edith Blenkiron (1904–1992), British flower artist
- Florence Blenkiron (1904–1991), British motorcycle racer
- Tim Blenkiron, Australian tennis coach
- William Blenkiron (c. 1807–1871), English racehorse breeder

== In Fiction ==
- John S. Blenkiron, fictional character
