= Andrew Hayden-Smith =

English actor and voiceover artist and former television presenter

- Hayden-Smith in 2011
- Born: Andrew John Smith; 5 November 1983 (age 43); Gateshead, England
- Occupations: Actor, voiceover artist, television presenter
- Years active: 1996–present
- Television: CBBC, ITV, Disney Channel
- Partner: Dan Maton

Andrew Hayden-Smith (born Andrew John Smith, 5 November 1983 in Gateshead, England) is an English actor, voiceover artist and former television presenter.

== Personal life ==
=== Early years ===
Hayden-Smith grew up in Chester-le-Street in County Durham and attended the Pelton Roseberry Sports and Community College. He has an older sister, Kerri Hayden, who also worked on Byker Grove as a 2nd AD. While visiting the set of Byker Grove one day, he was spotted by the series' Executive Producer Matthew Robinson, who cast him in the role of 'Ben Carter', making his first appearance in the eighth series of the show in 1996.

Initially just using the name Andrew Smith, he appeared as a guest on Saturday morning CBBC show Live & Kicking with several other characters from the show. Smith soon became a regular guest on the show. This led to appearances on other shows and also in teen-magazines, as well as two pantomime appearances. In 2001 he applied for Equity membership and was accepted under the name Andrew Hayden-Smith (Hayden being another surname in his family), as the name Andrew Smith was already taken. He announced his change of stage name on Live & Kicking.

Hayden-Smith is gay, coming out in Attitude magazine in February 2005, when he was 21.

He is in a long-term relationship with his boyfriend, Dan Maton.

== Career ==
Hayden-Smith was a regular guest in the CBBC studio for some time, and was invited to guest present the studio links in autumn 2002. He had expressed a wish for some time to have a go at presenting, and was encouraged by existing CBBC presenter Jake Humphrey to ask the bosses if he could stay on. This was agreed and Hayden-Smith moved to London to become half of the main presenting team for the afternoon slot on BBC1, a position he would continue to hold for just under four years. During that period from time to time he also presented the CBBC breakfast shows on BBC1 and BBC2 as well as the digital CBBC channel. In 2003 he also filmed his final scenes of Byker Grove, in which his character was killed off. Hayden-Smith became close friends with several of his fellow presenters, including Angellica Bell and Adrian Dickson.

During his time on CBBC, Hayden-Smith was once gunged in the studio after a phone-in deciding which presenter should get gunged in honour of the gameshow Get Your Own Back. With 63% of the votes, Hayden-Smith had a bucket of pink gunge and a bucket of green gunge poured directly over his head.

By this time he had begun presenting the UK Top 40 on CBBC. The show had begun in early 2002 along with the CBBC digital channel and was originally presented by Adrian Dickson and Konnie Huq. It was aired on Sunday nights concurrently with the Top 40 show on Radio One. After Dickson and Huq left the show in September 2004, Hayden-Smith was approached to become the sole presenter, having stood in for Dickson at the last minute one Sunday night several months previously. At first the show continued its success, but in 2005 the format changed to become more "computerised" and this was not received well. The last show was broadcast in June 2005.

Hayden-Smith appeared in the episodes "Rise of the Cybermen", "The Age of Steel" and "Doomsday" as Jake Simmonds in the 2006 series of Doctor Who. He returned to CBBC having completed the filming, but decided that he wished to concentrate on acting. His final day of presenting was on 7 July 2006, the day before his third and final Doctor Who appearance. On leaving CBBC and after his final Doctor Who appearance, Hayden-Smith played Romeo in Shakespeare's Romeo and Juliet at the Jermyn Street Theatre, London, 21 April – 17 May 2008. His position as Jake Simmonds on Doctor Who earned him a spot on The Weakest Link. In the first round, he banked the £5,000 target. Eventually, he placed fifth.

Hayden-Smith has been a roving reporter for Channel 5's morning programme, Live with Gabby, and was a regular presenter in The Hub on This Morning during the summer of 2013.

In 2014 and 2015, Hayden-Smith joined the cast of the Channel 4 series Cucumber and E4 series Banana, both from writer Russell T Davies.

In September 2015 he was on Hacker's Birthday Bash, screened on CBBC, a children's reunion show also featuring Andi Peters and Phillip Schofield.

Hayden-Smith is a regular continuity announcer, mainly on ITV and ITV2 but also does voiceover work for other channels, and is a contributor to Attitude.co.uk.

In July 2016, Hayden-Smith joined the cast of Channel 4 soap opera, Hollyoaks, as new regular police officer, DS Gavin Armstrong, the chief inspector investigating the murder of Patrick Blake (Jeremy Sheffield).

== Filmography ==
Year	Title	Role	Notes
1996–2003	Byker Grove	Ben Carter	Series 8–15
2000	Cinderella	Dandini	
2001	Peter Pan	Peter Pan	Main Role
2001	The Saturday Show	Himself	
2001	Live & Kicking Castaway	Himself	
2002–2006	CBBC	Himself	Main Presenter
2004	Company Bachelor of the Year	Participant	
2004–2005	UK Top 40	Himself	Main Presenter
2004	Blue Peter	Himself	
2006	Doctor Who	Jake Simmonds	Guest role (3 episodes)
2006	Doctor Who Confidential	Himself	
2006	Totally Doctor Who	Himself	
2007	The Weakest Link	Himself	
2012	Live with Gabby	Himself	Reporter
2012	Big Brother's Bit on the Side	Himself	
2013	Pointless Celebrities	Himself	Participant
2013	This Morning	Himself	Presenter of "The Hub"
2013	The Vault	Himself	Presenter of OMG! Pure Cheddar Cheese Pop! Top 20
2013	Doctor Who Live: The Afterparty	Himself	
2014	TV's Nastiest Villains	Himself	
2015	Banana	Billy	
2013-	PAW Patrol	Additional voices	UK and Ireland version
2015	Cucumber	Billy	
2015	Hacker's Birthday Bash: 30 Years of Children's BBC	Himself	
2016–2017	Hollyoaks	DS Gavin Armstrong	Regular role (64 episodes)
2025	Coronation Street	Pete Lang	Guest role
