= State visit by George W. Bush to the United Kingdom =

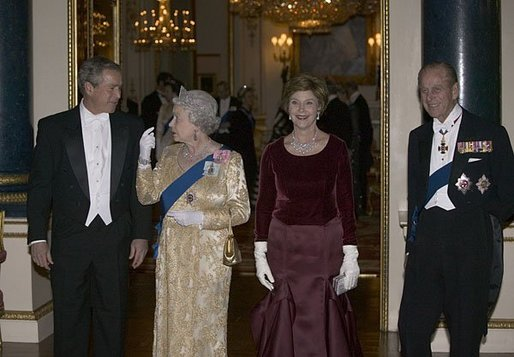
- Date: 18 to 21 November 2003
- Location: London Sedgefield
- Type: State visit
- Participants: President George W. Bush; First Lady Laura Bush

From 18 to 21 November 2003, the President of the United States, George W. Bush, made a state visit to the United Kingdom with his wife, the first lady of the United States, Laura Bush. He was received by Queen Elizabeth II and stayed at Buckingham Palace. The visit marked the first time a U.S. president had been invited for a state visit to the United Kingdom. Bush had previously met the Queen at Buckingham Palace in July 2001.

== Schedule ==
=== 18 November ===
President Bush and First Lady Laura Bush departed for the United Kingdom at Andrews Air Force Base in Maryland and arrived at Heathrow Airport on 18 November 2003 and were greeted by Charles, Prince of Wales. The couple then travelled via helicopter to Buckingham Palace for a private reception with Queen Elizabeth II. £5 million was spent by Scotland Yard to ensure security during the visit.

=== 19 November ===
Upon arrival at Buckingham Palace, President Bush and First Lady Laura Bush were officially greeted by the Queen and Prince Philip, Duke of Edinburgh and attended an official welcome ceremony with military elements by the Household Cavalry. The President then inspected the Guard of Honour. He and the First Lady then joined the Queen and Members of the British royal family for an exhibition of items from the Royal Collection at the Queen's Gallery. George W. Bush gave a speech at the Banqueting House covering topics such as 9/11 the Iraq War and stating "We will help the Iraqi people establish a peaceful and democratic country in the heart of the Middle East. And by doing so, we will defend our people from danger." He also met families of British 9/11 victims. Bush had been invited to address the UK Parliament but declined. The presidential couple attended the state banquet at the palace. In her speech at the state banquet at Buckingham Palace, the Queen spoke of the two countries' common purpose and shared values, adding "We share the confidence - and the courage - to try and make this a more prosperous, a safer, and above all a freer world."

=== 20 November ===
President Bush and Laura Bush toured Westminster Abbey and laid a wreath at the grave of the Unknown Warrior. He also met with UK soldiers that were deployed for the War in Afghanistan and the Iraq War and visited 10 Downing Street. The President and Prime Minister Tony Blair also held a joint press conference at the Foreign Office. He then hosted a formal dinner at Winfield House.

=== 21 November ===
The President and the First Lady bid the Queen farewell at Buckingham Palace and flew to Teesside Airport. They were then received by Prime Minister Blair and his wife Cherie Blair at their home, Myrobella House, in Trimdon Station before joining them for lunch at Dun Cow Inn in Sedgefield. The two couples then went for a tour of Sedgefield Community College. The security operation put in place for the area cost £1 million. The presidential couple departed for the United States at Teesside Airport.

== Opposition ==
A Guardian/ICM opinion poll concluded that 43% of British people were supportive of the state visit, while with 36% wished Bush had not been invited, and 21% showed a neutral opinion. Anti-war protests took place in London on 18 November. A Stop Bush rally was organised near Euston Station and the London Mayor Ken Livingstone held a peace party attended by different groups opposed to the then-ongoing Iraq War. A statue of Bush was toppled at Trafalgar Square on 20 November. 500 to 1000 people protest at County Durham during Bush's visit to Sedgefield on 21 November. At the beginning of the visit Bush had stated that he believed in freedom of speech and expected the trip to be "fantastic".

== Gallery ==
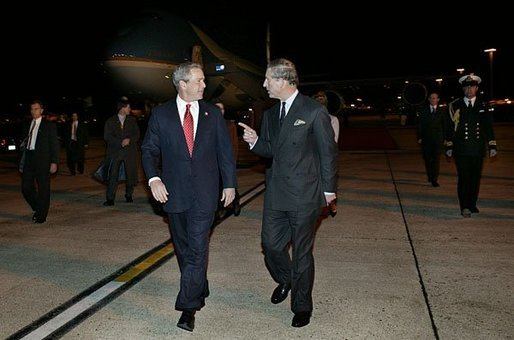
President George W. Bush greeted by Charles, Prince of Wales at Heathrow Airport

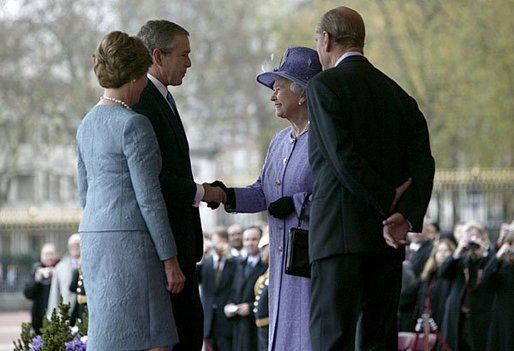
President Bush and First Lady Laura Bush greeted by Queen Elizabeth II and Prince Philip, Duke of Edinburgh at Buckingham Palace

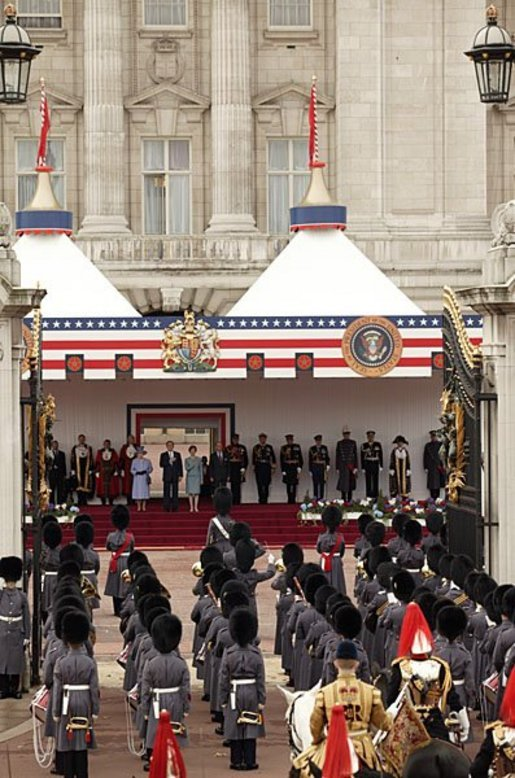
President Bush and First Lady Laura Bush listening to the U.S. national anthem at Buckingham Palace

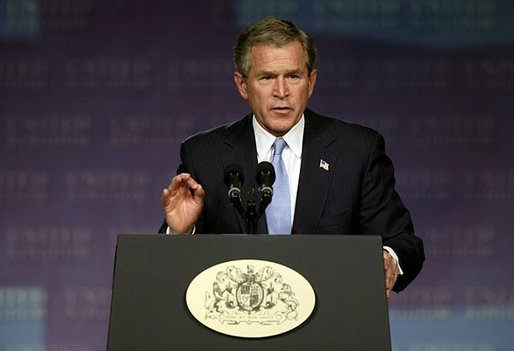
President Bush speaks about Iraq and the war on terror at the Banqueting House in London

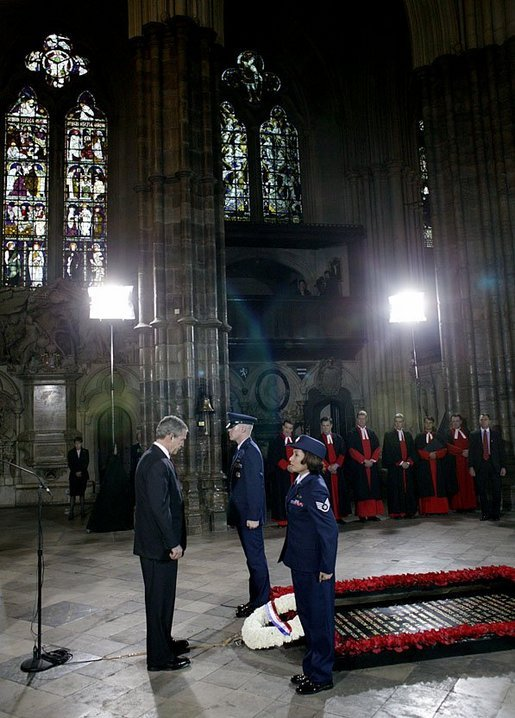
The President lays a wreath at the grave of the Unknown Warrior at Westminster Abbey

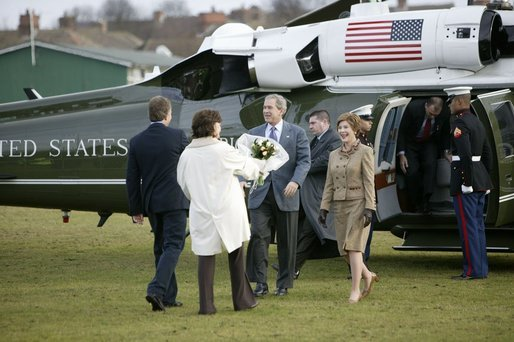
President Bush and First Lady Laura Bush arrive at Prime Minister Tony Blair and his wife Cherie Blair at their home, Myrobella House, Trimdon Station

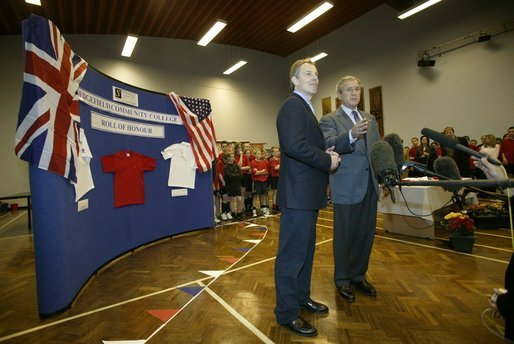
President Bush and First Lady Laura Bush participate in a visit with Prime Minister Blair and Cherie Blair at Sedgefield Community College
