= Roseberry College =

Roseberry College and Sixth Form

Location
- Newfield, County Durham, DH2 1NW; England; 54°52′02″N 1°37′19″W

Information
- Type: Community school
- Motto: Aim High, Achieve Excellence
- Established: 1963
- Closed: 2014
- Department for Education URN: 114287 Tables
- Ofsted: Reports
- Gender: Coeducational
- Age: 11 to 18
- Houses: Ravensworth, Lumley, Finchale
- Website: https://web.archive.org/web/20140516191141/http://www.roseberrycollege.co.uk/

Roseberry College and Sixth Form was a state-funded secondary school and sixth form in County Durham, England, founded in 1963 and closed in 2014. The final college Principal was Ann Bowen, who is also a geography textbook author for the examination board AQA.

The school was housed on a very large single site with capacity for almost 1000 pupils in the Pelton, County Durham / Newfield, Chester-le-Street / Ouston, County Durham areas.

== History ==
The school opened as Pelton Roseberry Secondary Modern in 1963.

In the mid-1970s, there were several fires at the school, mentioned in Up The Rhubarb Tree, an e-book by former pupil Joseph Crawford. On 5 September 1975 a £250,000 fire was caused by 15 year old boy.

Roseberry College achieved Sports College status in c. 2003. The PE department enjoyed some of the best facilities in the Local Authority with a gym, sports hall, enclosed and flood-lit AGS pitch (Artificial Grass Surface), full-sized climbing wall, athletics track, tennis, netball and outdoor basketball courts as well as approximately 20 hectares of sports fields making it one of the largest school sites in County Durham.

In March 2010, the school was named as one of the "most improved specialist schools" by the Specialist Schools and Academies Trust. It narrowly lost out on the "Most Improved in the North East Region" prize to nearby Oxclose Community School.

In December 2010, Roseberry received confirmation from the BBC that it was a winning school for the BBC/British Council's Olympic Schools search. As part of being a winning school, it was twinned with Colégio Certo in Piaui, in the North-East of Brazil, which was the high school of Sarah Menezes. The two colleges worked collaboratively on activities and projects with all year groups in the lead up to the 2012 London Olympic games.

In June 2011, Roseberry won the RBS Personal Finance Education Awards for Schools. The College won "The Best all-round approach to Personal Finance Education" against UK-wide competition.

In September 2013, Durham County Council started a consultation period on falling rolls; student numbers declined to under 200 pupils by early 2014 because of uncertainty over the college's future, and the council voted in February 2014 to close the school. The closure took effect from 31 August 2014. Demolition of the school buildings began in late 2015.

== Gallery ==
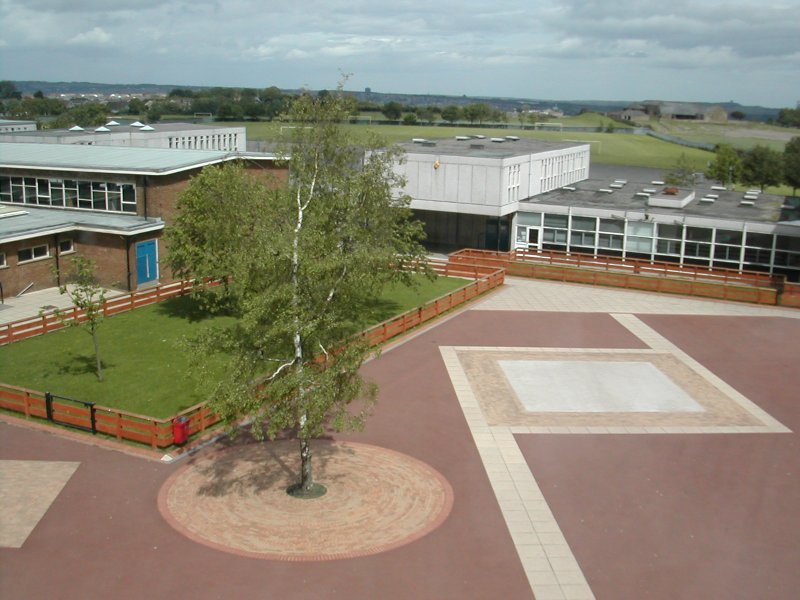
View from main block of Quad with Sports hall, Sixth Form Centre and Humanities blocks with sports fields behind.

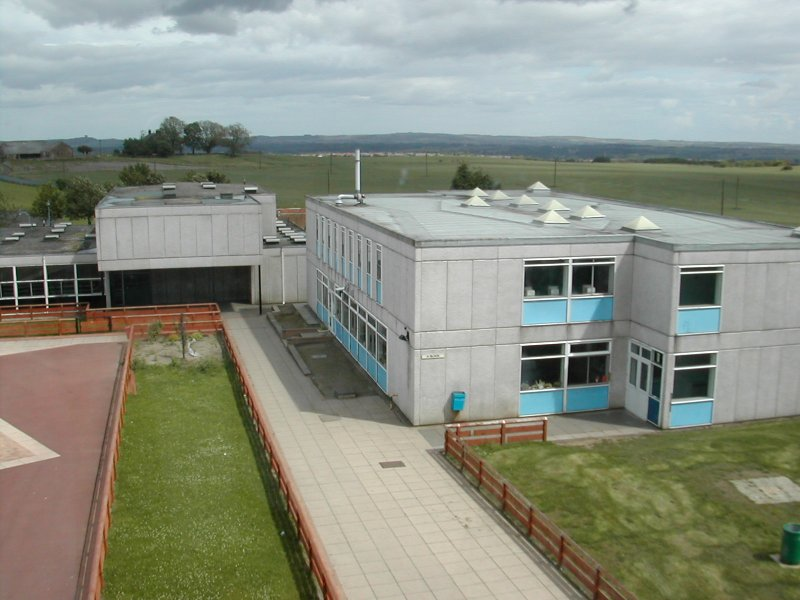
View from main block of Science Labs and a House block.

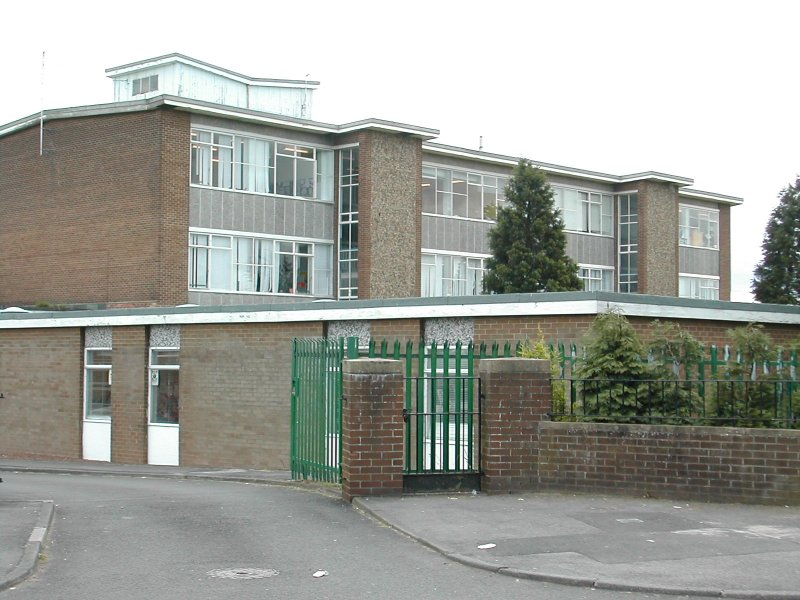
View of main block that housed Mathematics, English, ICT and Modern Foreign Languages Departments.

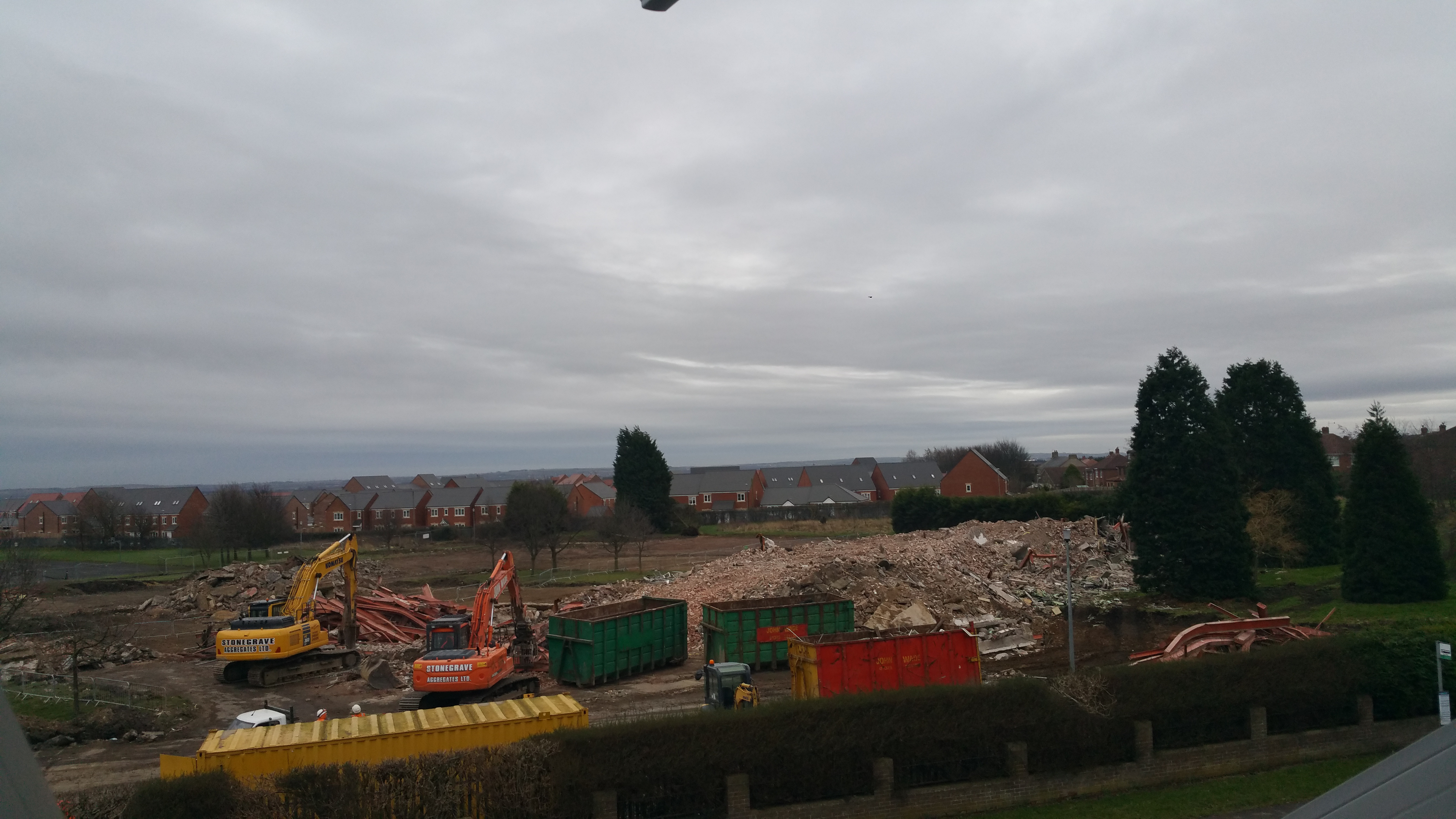
View of Roseberry College site as of 4 February 2016.

== Notable former pupils ==
- Andrew Hayden-Smith, actor and television presenter
- Gavin Sutherland, composer and conductor
- David Burn, Musician and front man with the band Detroit Social Club

=== Pelton Secondary Modern School ===
- Tim Healy (actor) of Auf Wiedersehen, Pet
