= Redmarshall =

Village in County Durham, England

Coordinates: 54.5838°N 1.4013°W

- Location within County Durham
- Population: 354 (2008/9)
- OS grid reference: SU748232
- Civil parish: Redmarshall
- Unitary authority: Stockton-on-Tees
- Ceremonial county: County Durham
- Region: North East
- Country: England
- Sovereign state: United Kingdom
- Post town: Stockton-on-Tees
- Postcode district: TS21
- Dialling code: 01740
- Police: Cleveland
- Fire: Cleveland
- Ambulance: North East
- UK Parliament: Stockton West

Redmarshall is a village and civil parish in the borough of Stockton-on-Tees and ceremonial county of County Durham, England. The population as of the 2011 census was 287. Redmarshall is situated to the west of Stockton-on-Tees, just north of the A66 road which is one of the main trunk routes through Teesside. It is home to the Church of Saint Cuthbert. It has a green in the centre and roads such as Church Lane, Coniston Crescent and Windermere Avenue, named after waters in the Lake District. A small wood is a short way out of the village and down a bank past Ferguson Way. There is a new housing estate called The Langtons being built on the old remains of the mains care home.

== History ==
Redmarshall was founded in the first half of the twentieth century and was one of the smallest villages in County Durham up until development and construction started in the first half of the 19th century. Redmarshall is now home to 350 people living in 130 households. Redmarshall has its origins as a farming community over hundreds of years; however, today only two of the original four farms survive with the most recent of the two lost being turned into a care home for the elderly. Redmarshall acquired its name from the reed marshes and bogs that exist in the area.

== Census and population ==
Employment based on 1831 data

Historical population
Year	Pop.	±%
1801	228	—
1811	223	−2.2%
1821	264	+18.4%
1831	335	+26.9%
1841	272	−18.8%
1851	332	+22.1%
1861	91	−72.6%
1871	78	−14.3%
1881	55	−29.5%
1891	55	+0.0%
1901	75	+36.4%
1911	87	+16.0%
1921	105	+20.7%
1931	116	+10.5%

The Census is a country wide data retrial devise that allows the government to see and control where funding is needed most. The data is available for public use and distribution and is carried out every 10 years. This image shoes the Social Status, based on 1831 occupations. We can see that this rural area was largely made up of servants and manual laborers (as shown in green.) The employers would have largely have been the farm (of which there were 4 at this time.) The 1831 census provides information, down to parish-level, the data however only shows the occupations of males aged over 20.

== Church ==
Redmarshall is home to St Cuthbert’s Church, so named in honour of St Cuthbert, an Anglo-Saxon monk and bishop. St Cuthbert is one of six churches that come together to form the Stockton Deanery in the diocese of Durham.

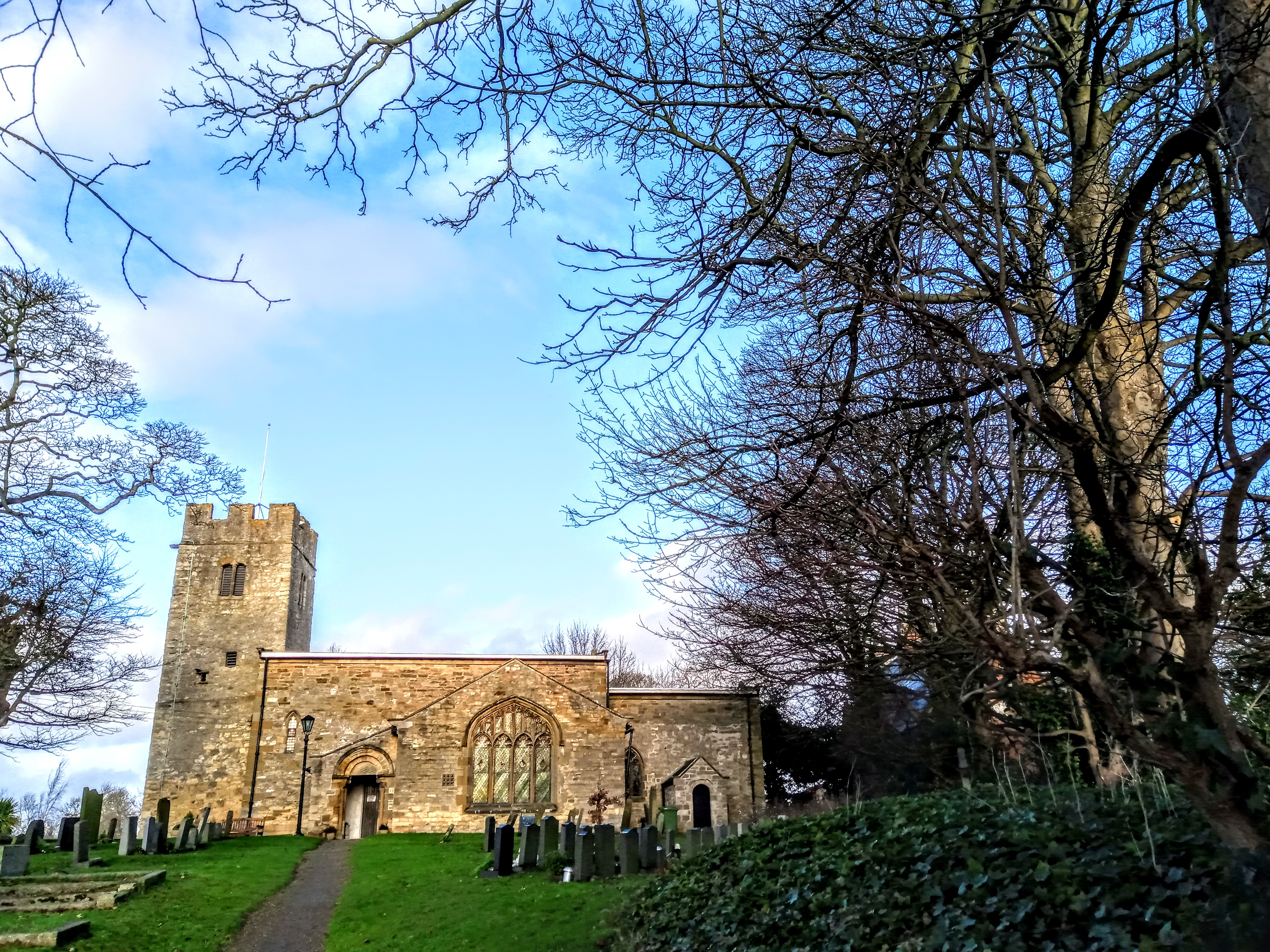
St Cuthbert's, Redmarshall, County Durham.

The churches are all of Anglican descent and form the local parish. St Cuthbert is a Grade-one listed building built in the late twelfth century. The current Church building is situated on the same site as the preceding Saxon church, which is notable for St Cuthbert's body having rested here on its long wandering journey before finally being laid to rest at Durham Cathedral. The building is made largely of local stone. The Church Fête is a long-running village tradition that used to be held in the grounds of local houses and also the village pub, the Ship, however in recent years it has been held on the village green. The Fête is held yearly and is in aid of St Cuthbert's Church. For the previous four years the event has been held on the village green in Redmarshall, on the last Sunday in August at 2pm. There is usually a tombola, raffle, stalls, games and afternoon teas. In 2012 the date was 26 August.

== Governance ==
Redmarshall Parish Council meets at 18:30 in the Methodist Chapel Schoolroom, on the second Monday in every month (except August). Redmarshall also belongs to the North Township division (A division of a county with some corporate powers) and lies in the Stockton-on-Tees district. Local electoral results can be seen in the local newspaper, the Evening Gazette which is published weekly on Wednesdays.

== Education ==
Redmarshall once had a primary school located within the village, however it was closed and later demolished through lack of students. The site along Church Lane in Redmarshall now has a bungalow situated on it. Opposite to the bungalow is a nursing home, which was one of the original farms in Redmarshall. The nearest primary school is now located less than one mile away in Bishopton, which is larger than Redmarshall and is school to 72 pupils, 31 girls and 41 boys ages from 4 to 11. The school is a C of School and has an overall rating of 2. The nearest private primary school is Red House School in Norton 3.6 miles away from Redmarshall. They take both male and female students from 3 to 16. The village never had a secondary school, and the nearest public school is over 3 miles away, Sedgefield Community College a Specialist Sports College, school to 851 students. Polam Hall School is a primary to 6th form education that is most well known for its outstanding secondary school level results. The School is 8.7 miles from Redmarshall and takes both males and female students from 3 to 18 years of age. There are a number of local Colleges and further education schemes. Stockton Sixth Form College is located only 4.5 miles away from Redmarshall. The closet university is Durham University.

== Historic public house ==
The Ship is approximately 260 years old, located in Redmarshall. It is a five-minute drive from Stockton On Tees and approximately 15 minutes from Darlington. The pub is called the ship as it was originally built from the timbers of ships that foundered off the River Tees.

== Transport in and around Redmarshall ==
The No. 6 Bus Service The first bus on weekdays no longer runs to Stockton. The local villages have a Tees Flex service Redmarshall used to have a village railway station in the late 19th century, it however was renamed "Carlton" railway station and then later closed through lack of use early into the 20th century.

== Additional information ==
Facility	Present (Yes/No)
Public Phone Box	No
Public House	Yes
Village Green	Yes
Village Shop	No
Village Hall	No
Recreational area	No
Post Box	Yes
Areas of outstanding natural beauty	Yes
