= Hermitage Academy, Chester-le-Street =

Hermitage Academy

Location
- Waldridge Lane; Chester-le-Street; County Durham, DH2 3AD; England
- Coordinates: 54.85122°N 1.59264°W

Information
- Former names: The Hermitage Academy, The Hermitage School
- Type: Academy
- Motto: Every Child Experiences Excellence Every Day
- Local authority: Durham County Council
- Trust: North East Learning Trust
- Department for Education URN: 147531 Tables
- Ofsted: Reports
- Executive Headteacher: Yvonne Weston
- Head of School: Lindsay Maughan
- Gender: Mixed
- Age: 11 to 18
- Enrolment: 1,083
- Capacity: 1050
- Colours: Blue & White
- Website: http://www.hermitageacademy.co.uk/

Hermitage Academy (formerly The Hermatige School and The Hermitage Academy) is a mixed secondary school and sixth form located in Chester-le-Street, County Durham, England. It is currently sponsored by North East Learning Trust (NELT), a multi-academy trust with partner & sponsor schools across North East England, including Academy at Shotton Hall and Teesdale School.

Prior to 2019, the school was sponsored by The Hermitage Academy Trust, a single academy trust. Before the school was taken over by NELT, Miss Felicity Smith was appointed as principal, appointed in November 2015 after the resignation of Mr Jim Murray.

Previously a foundation school administered by Durham County Council, The Hermitage School converted to academy status in April 2011 and was renamed The Hermitage Academy. However, the school continues to coordinate with Durham County Council for admissions.

The Hermitage Academy offers GCSEs and BTECs as programmes of study for Key Stage 4 pupils, while students in the sixth form have the option to study from a range of A-levels, Cambridge Nationals and further BTECs.

== Ofsted Inspection ==
In their most recent Ofsted Inspection, occurring in October 2018, Hermitage Academy was deemed Inadequate by inspectors. Inspectors stated that teaching was far too variable between lessons, leaders have been too slow halting the decline in the quality of student's education, and that the school had weak progress from Year 7 to Year 11. However, it was also pointed out that students were polite and courteous around school, safeguarding was effective and situations of bullying were dealt with effectively. In response, the school was taken over by the North East Learning Trust, which is discussed in detail further down the page. A second inspection is expected within the next few academic years, to assess the Academy's progress.

The previous inspection The Hermitage School received was in 2007, with inspectors deeming the school Outstanding.

== Construction of the Year 7 Teaching Block ==
Completed June 2017, the Year 7 Block was a £1.3 million building provides 8 new classrooms labelled from 7–1 up to 7–8, toilets and an amenity space for new Year 7 students. The new building formed part of the Academy's on-going estate management and curriculum improvements and was designed for the youngest year group to ease their transition to the main school after moving from primary school. Included in all classrooms are spaces for 32 students, as well as slide across whiteboards & television screens as projectors. Two of the rooms are also separated with a folding partition wall, which can be folded to form one larger room. During the 2019 GCSEs, this block was used primarily for Year 11s. As of June 2019, this block is now used as a block for English, as Year 7 students revert to moving through the school for their lessons.

== North East Learning Trust ==
It was announced on 10 June 2019 that as of the following academic year, the North East Learning Trust will be appointed to sponsor the school. The North East Learning Trust is a multi-academy Trust founded by Academy at Shotton Hall, an outstanding secondary school in Peterlee.
