= Thomas Hepburn =

English coal miner and trade union leader

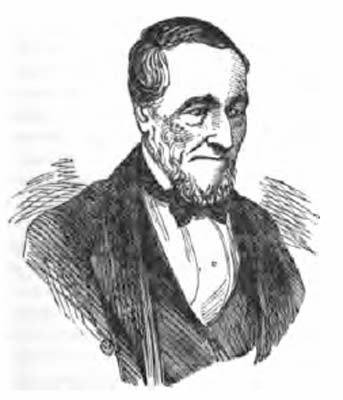
Thomas Hepburn. Illustration from an 1873 book. This portrait of "Tommy Hepburn" appears alongside Lawrence Daly on the banner of the National Union of Mineworkers, Durham Area, Easington Lodge as well as on that of Blackhall Miners' Lodge.

Thomas Hepburn (c. 1795 – 9 December 1864), often known as Tommy Hepburn, was an English coal miner and trade union leader.

== Background ==
Hepburn was born in Pelton, County Durham. He began employment as a coal miner as a child, aged just 8 years old at Fatfield Colliery. Despite economic circumstance forcing his employment in childhood, as was common for working class children at the time, he was an intelligent child, able to read the Bible from an early age, remaining interested in education all his life.

== Industrial Action ==
He moved to Jarrow Colliery, and then Hetton Colliery before forming The Colliers of the United Association of Durham and Northumberland soon after 1825, which was colloquially known as Hepburn's Union. Some of the first industrial action undertaken by this union, under Hepburn's guidance was to go on strike to seek improved conditions. In this aim the strike was largely successful, with working hours for boys being reduced from around 17-18 hours a day to a 12-hour shift, and ensuring that payment for labour was always in money, ending the system of "Tommy Shops" whereby the miners had to purchase provisions from a shop either owned or preferred by the colliery owner, with wages being confiscated to pay off the shop owner before the employee could directly receive them.

== Conflict ==
Hepburn then quickly had to involve his union in further industrial action in 1832 to ensure that unionised workers were given employment as pit owners threatened to cease employment of them. This strike was more bitter than the previous one, and despite Hepburn's best efforts to ensure that all action was peaceful, violence broke out on a number of occasions, such as at Friar's Goose, where unionised lead miners attacked non-unionised miners from Cumberland who had been brought in to replace them. In another action a South Shields magistrate, Nicholas Fairless was beaten so badly by a striking miner that he died from his wounds. A miner, William Jobling became one of the last men in Britain to be gibbeted for this, although not guilty of the murder. Elsewhere a miner Cuthbert Skipsey was shot by a police constable during a disorder.

This strike withered and the union crumbled as the miners realised the necessity of employment and a wage to live was greater than the principle of trade union solidarity. The strike leaders were scapegoated by the authorities, and Thomas Hepburn became unable to secure employment as a miner thereafter, being banned from the coalfield.

Thereafter he attempted to sell tea at the mines to make a living, but in this venture he was largely unsuccessful.

Destitute, he was eventually re-employed at a colliery, at Felling, on the grounds that he did not get involved in trade union activity. He did not re-engage in any union activity but remained active in radical political circles. During 1838-39 he worked on behalf of the Chartists. He continued to work at Felling until retiring due to ill health in 1859.

== Death ==
He continued to live in the area until the last few months of his life, when he moved to live with his son-in-law in Newcastle. He died on 9 December 1864, aged 69, after a career spanning 56 years and a retirement of just five years.

Buried at Heworth Churchyard, there stands a headstone with a testimony to his trade union activity. Thomas Hepburn Community Academy in Felling was named in his honour.

== Further study ==
- Fynes, Richard (1873), The Miners of Northumberland and Durham, Blyth: John Robinson, Jun., p. 340
