= Thomas Hepburn Community Academy =

Location
- Swards Road; Felling, Gateshead, Tyne and Wear, NE10 9UZ; England; 54.9444°N 1.562°W

Information
- Type: Academy
- Established: 1990
- Closed: 2019
- Department for Education URN: 140035 Tables
- Ofsted: Reports
- Gender: Coeducational
- Age: 11 to 16
- Houses: Atwood, Forster, Jude, Larkin
- Colours: Purple and Grey

Thomas Hepburn Community Academy (formerly Thomas Hepburn Community School) was a coeducational secondary school with academy status, located in Gateshead, Tyne and Wear, England. The school served about 700 pupils aged 11–16.

== History ==
There was a deliberate fire at the Highfield site in August 1972 costing £200,000, being rebuilt by April 1974. There was another deliberate fire at the Highfield site on Saturday 8 July 1978 at 9pm, with 16 fire engines, costing £750,000, started by a 15-year-old boy.

Thomas Hepburn Community School was founded in 1990 following the merger of Sheriff Hill and Highfield Schools, based at the Highfield site. It was named for Thomas Hepburn, a trade union leader. The original headmaster was Mr. C.B. Buddle who had previously been headmaster at Sheriff Hill.

In 2009 the school started an extensive rebuild project which saw the demolition of North and South block, the school hall, sports hall and gym as well as the refurbishment of the Technology block which now is home to the Art, Humanities and ICT departments. The Lifelong Learning building was refurbished over the summer break in 2011.

In 2012 Thomas Hepburn was judged to be "Unsatisfactory" by Ofsted, and the 2012 Exam results placed the school among the 200 lowest attaining schools in the country.

In January 2013 the Department of Education made the decision to convert the school into an academy, which formally occurred in October 2013. The school was then renamed Thomas Hepburn Community Academy.

In 2015 a new system of a "mini school" took place, letting the year 7 students be free from the older students.

In 2019, the school closed, due to dwindling student numbers, mainly attributed to poor exam results.

== Ofsted ==
In February 2017, the academy was rated 'Inadequate' by Ofsted. The report said almost all pupils failed to achieve good enough qualifications and the brightest pupils weren't fulfilling their potential, while poorly planned teaching saw academic strugglers punished.

Inspectors said teachers “settle too often for incomplete work or work of a poor standard”, and pupils who missed lessons weren't helped to catch up, and quickly fell behind. Meanwhile, behaviour was described as sub-standard.

The report said: “The majority of pupils have a positive attitude to learning but a significant number of pupils purposely disrupt learning for themselves and others.

These issues have been ongoing seemingly since the school was formed.
