= UK Top 40 (TV series) =

Television series

- Presented by: Adrian Dickson; Konnie Huq; Andrew Hayden-Smith
- Country of origin: United Kingdom
- No. of series: 3

Production
- Running time: 60 minutes (series 1 and 3); 30 minutes (series 2)

Original release
- Network: CBBC Channel
- Release: 24 February 2002 – 16 June 2005

Related
- Top of the Pops Reloaded; Top of the Pops; TOTP2; UK Top 40

UK Top 40 is a British music chart children's television programme, made by the BBC and broadcast live on Sundays at 6pm on the CBBC channel from 2002 to 2005. The programme ran down the UK singles chart with the number one revealed simultaneously with The Official Chart programme on BBC Radio 1. The programme was part of the launch line-up of the CBBC channel in February 2002. It was originally hosted by Konnie Huq and Adrian Dickson, and later Andrew Hayden-Smith when Dickson left the programme in 2004.

== Series ==
Adrian and Konnie then both left the show after two series and it was seen as the end of an era. Many thought that the show would become interactive with a voice over but in 2004 it was revealed for the third series that Andrew Hayden-Smith would take over. With the series three rebrand the viewers left due to competition from Top of the Pops which moved to the same time slot.

== Series 1 (2002–2003) ==
The first series was anchored by Konnie and Adrian and contained guests and more fun competitions and games and counted down the top 40 singles in the UK.

== UK Top 40: CBBC Viewers Vote (Christmas 2002) ==
This special hosted by Adrian Dickson and a short report from Konnie Huq who was unavailable due to Blue Peter. This show is when the CBBC viewers get to vote for their favourite songs of that year. It also contained guests and competitions. This aired on Boxing Day at 10:45am on BBC One.

Top five
No.	Song	Artist
1	"Dirrty"	Christina Aguilera featuring Redman
2	"Complicated"	Avril Lavigne
3	"Wherever You Will Go"	The Calling
4	"Dilemma"	Nelly featuring Kelly Rowland
5	"Anyone of Us (Stupid Mistake)"	Gareth Gates

== Series 2 (2003–2004) ==
The second series was reduced by 30 minutes and featured no games but it had a weekly competition and still had a celebrity guest to perform.

== UK Top 40: CBBC Viewers Vote (New Year 2004) ==
This special hosted by Konnie Huq and Andrew Hayden-Smith (who was guest presenting for this special), Adrian was unavailable due to other commitments. This show is when the CBBC viewers get to vote for their favourite songs of that year. It also contained guests and competitions. This year it aired on New Year's Day at 2:45pm on BBC One.

Top five
No.	Song	Artist
1	"Crashed the Wedding"	Busted
2	"Where Is the Love?"	The Black Eyed Peas
3	"I'm Your Man"	Shane Richie
4	"Leave Right Now"	Will Young
5	"Flip Reverse"	Blazin' Squad

== Series 3 (2004–2005) ==
The final series was 1 hour again and featured competitions but no celebrity guests. It mainly counted down the top 40.

== Time Slot ==
The original time slot was Sundays at 6:00pm for one hour, but in series two a new CBBC show called The Agents was put in that timeslot from 6:00pm–6:30pm so CBBC found as the current time slot was so successful they would reduce the show to 30 minutes and at the new time of 6:30pm.

== Presenters ==
- Konnie Huq (2002–2004)
- Adrian Dickson (2002–2004)
- Andrew Hayden-Smith (2004–2005)
