= J. P. E. Harper-Scott =

British musicologist b. 1977

J. P. E. Harper-Scott (born 3 December 1977) is a British musicologist and formerly Professor of Music History and Theory at Royal Holloway, University of London. He is a General Editor of the Cambridge University Press series 'Music in Context'.

== Education and employment ==
John Paul Edward Harper-Scott was born in Easington, County Durham. He was educated at Shotton Hall Comprehensive School, and received an undergraduate degree at Durham University. He subsequently received a D.Phil at the University of Oxford in 2004, for a thesis "Elgar's musical language : analysis, hermeneutics, humanity". He worked at the University of Nottingham and the University of Liverpool before moving to Royal Holloway, University of London. In September 2021, Harper-Scott announced his resignation from Royal Holloway over dissatisfaction with the increasing politicisation of music in academia and attempts to 'decolonise' the curriculum.

== Scholarship ==
Known for his work on musical modernism, he has argued that Edward Elgar should be considered 'a subtle and important harbinger of twentieth-century modernism'. He has also established a link between techniques of music analysis and the theories of Jacques Lacan. According to Lawrence Kramer, Harper-Scott's The Quilting Points of Musical Modernism poses a challenge to musicology: he writes that 'the book is a sweeping indictment of musicology and a manifesto for its transformation. Its core thesis is that musicology today is mired in a neoliberal late-Capitalist swamp from which it blindly ignores "our most pressing present concern – to escape the horrors of the present by imagining the transformations of a coming society".' One result of his work is that ideology critique, traditionally associated in musicology with the philosopher Adorno (1903–69), 'has a significant role to play in the future of the discipline'.

== Bibliography ==
=== As author ===
- Edward Elgar, Modernist (Cambridge and New York: Cambridge University Press, 2006).
- Elgar: an Extraordinary Life (London: Associated Board of the Royal Schools of Music, 2007).
- The Quilting Points of Musical Modernism: Revolution, Reaction, and William Walton (Cambridge and New York: Cambridge University Press, 2012).
- Ideology in Britten's Operas (Cambridge and New York: Cambridge University Press, 2018).
- The Event of Music History (Woodbridge: Boydell, 2021).
- Return to Riemann: Tonal Function in Chromatic Music, with Oliver Chandler (Abingdon and New York: Routledge, 2024).

=== As editor ===
- Elgar Studies, edited with Julian Rushton (Cambridge and New York: Cambridge University Press, 2007).
- An Introduction to Music Studies, edited with Jim Samson (Cambridge and New York: Cambridge University Press, 2009).

== Secondary sources ==
- Beard, David, and Gloag, Kenneth, eds, Musicology: The Key Concepts, 2nd edn. (London and New York: Routledge, 2016).
- Begbie, Jeremy, 'Confidence and Anxiety in Elgar's "Dream of Gerontius"', in Music and Theology in Nineteenth-Century Britain, edited by Martin Clarke (Farnham: Ashgate, 2012), pp. 197–214.
- Hicks, Jonathan, 'Musicology for Art Historians', in The Routledge Companion to Music and Visual Culture, edited by Tim Sheppard and Anne Leonard (New York and London: Routledge, 2014), pp. 35–42.
- Kramer, Lawrence, The Thought of Music (Oakland: University of California Press, 2016).
