= Ashington Academy =

Location
- Green Lane; Ashington; Northumberland, NE63 8DH; England; 55.17811°N 1.57966°W

Information
- Type: Academy
- Established: 1960
- Local authority: Northumberland
- Trust: North East Learning Trust
- Department for Education URN: 144601 Tables
- Ofsted: Reports
- Headteacher: Yvonne Weston
- Gender: Co-educational
- Age: 11 to 18
- Website: www.ashingtonacademy.co.uk

Ashington Academy is a secondary school and sixth form located in Ashington in the English county of Northumberland.

== History ==
It was established in 1960 as Ashington County Grammar School. It became a comprehensive school in the mid 1970s and was renamed Ashington High School. In 2007 it became a foundation school in administered by Northumberland County Council and the Ashington Learning Partnership. The school also gained specialist status as a Sports College.

Formerly an upper school for pupils aged 13 to 18, in September 2015 Ashington High School expanded to take pupils from the age of 11. Building works were undertaken at the school for the expansion.

In November 2017 Ashington High School converted to academy status and was renamed Ashington Academy. The school is now sponsored by the North East Learning Trust.

== Curriculum ==
Ashington Academy offers GCSEs and BTECs as programmes of study for pupils, while students in the sixth form have the option to study from a range of A-levels and further BTECs.

== Notable former pupils ==
=== Ashington County Grammar School ===
- Hilton Dawson, Labour Party politician

=== Ashington High School ===
- Steve Harmison, England cricket player
- Mark Wood, England cricket player
