= Durham Academy, Ushaw Moor =

Durham Academy

Location
- Bracken Court; Ushaw Moor, County Durham, DH7 7NG; England
- Coordinates: 54°46′54″N 1°38′16″W

Information
- Type: Academy
- Local authority: Durham County Council
- Trust: Advance Learning Partnership
- Department for Education URN: 149251 Tables
- Ofsted: Reports
- Headteacher: Alison Jobling
- Gender: Coeducational
- Age: 11 to 16
- Website: durhamacademy.org.uk

Durham Academy (formerly Durham Community Business College) is a coeducational secondary school located in Ushaw Moor, County Durham, England.

The school educates pupils from Ushaw Moor and surrounding villages, including Sacriston, Lanchester, Esh Winning, Witton Gilbert, Langley Park and other areas North of Durham.

== History ==
In 2018, Durham Community Business College and Fyndoune Community College federated to become one provision - the Durham Federation. The majority of students were then educated at Durham Community Business College in Ushaw Moor. Fyndoune Community College in Sacriston offered a bespoke nurture provision as well as alternative education and vocational courses. As part of the federation, in 2018 the Ushaw Moor site had a new creative block constructed. This block includes catering facilities, an auditorium and music, technology and art facilities.

In March 2020, a further proposal was announced to merge the two colleges into a single site, following a request by the Department for Education. This was as a result of both schools being rated inadequate by Ofsted in 2014 and being told to find an academy sponsor, which they had failed to do. Both schools where handed back to Durham County Council subject to being merged into a single site.

Between 5 October & 15 November 2020 a consultation was carried out with governors, staff, parents and the wider community. 9 responses where received, with 5 supporting the schools merger and 4 against it. However, the council pointed out the responses against the merger failed to put forward education reasons to keep both schools open. In a report dated 19 November 2020, the Corporate Director of Children and Young People’s Services used their delegate powers to approve the merger of the colleges sites into a single site - Durham Community Business College with a proposed closure date for the Sacriston site as 12 April 2021.

A further 4 week consultation period started on 26 November and no objections to the plans where received. The closure went ahead on 11 April 2021, one day earlier than expected.

Previously a community school administered by Durham County Council, in January 2023 Durham Community Business College converted to academy status and was renamed Durham Academy. The school is now sponsored by the Advance Learning Partnership.

== Academics ==
Durham Academy offers GCSEs, BTECs, Cambridge Nationals and WJEC qualifications as programmes of study for pupils.
