= George Burdon McKean =

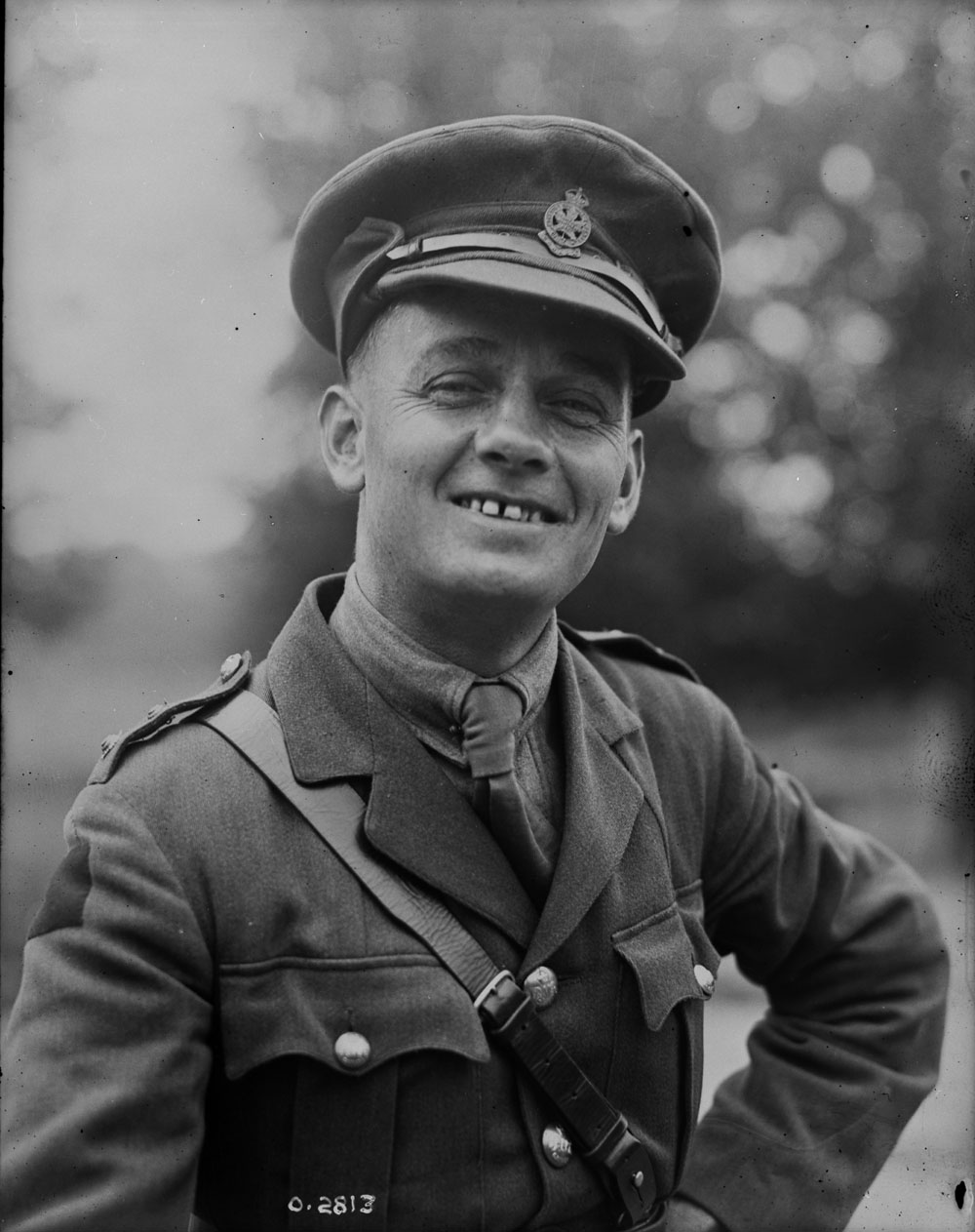
- Born: 4 July 1888; Willington, County Durham, England
- Died: 28 November 1926 (aged 38); Potters Bar, Hertfordshire, England
- Burial place: Brighton Extra Mural Cemetery, East Sussex
- Military career
- Allegiance: Canada
- Branch: Canadian Expeditionary Force
- Service years: 1915 - 1926
- Rank: Captain
- Unit: 14th Battalion (Royal Montreal Regiment), CEF
- Conflicts: World War I
- Awards: Victoria Cross; Military Cross; Military Medal

George Burdon McKean VC MC MM (4 July 1888 – 28 November 1926) was an English-Canadian soldier who served in World War I. McKean was a recipient of the Victoria Cross, the highest and most prestigious award for valour in the face of the enemy that can be awarded to British and Commonwealth forces.

== Early life ==
George Burdon McKean was born in Willington, County Durham, England on 4 July 1888. He came to Canada in 1902 and settled in Edmonton. He was a student at the University of Alberta and assistant minister at Robertson Church. Either just before his enlistment in January 1915 or sometime a few months after, he married Isabel Hall (and sometime later he married again). (A book he wrote after the war, Making Good - A Story of North-West Canada, was based on his knowledge of life in Alberta.)

== World War I ==
In early 1915 McKean enlisted in the Canadian Expeditionary Force. He was awarded three separate medals for outstanding valour. In the course of his military service, he received the Military Medal and the Victoria Cross and, after he was commissioned as an officer, the Military Cross. He was one of only a handful of people who have won all three and lived to peacetime.

As a corporal in 1917, he was awarded the Military Medal for rescuing wounded men under fire.

A year later, he was 29 years old, and a lieutenant in the 14th (The Royal Montreal Regiment) Battalion, when the following deed took place for which he was awarded the Victoria Cross.

On 27/28 April 1918 at the Gavrelle Sector, France, when Lieutenant McKean's party was held up at a block in the communication trench by intense fire, he ran into the open, leaping over the block head first on top of one of the enemy. Whilst lying there, he was attacked by another with a fixed bayonet. He shot both of these men, captured the position, then sent back for more bombs, and until they arrived he engaged the enemy single-handed. He then rushed a second block, killing two of the enemy, capturing four others, and driving the remainder into a dug-out, which he then destroyed.

He later achieved the rank of captain.

In the closing months of the war, Canada's Hundred Days, he led the capture of Cagnicourt near Arras, using, one historian wrote, "little but courage and bravado." He won the Military Cross but was probably due another Victoria Cross as his actions were so incredible.

McKean wrote of his wartime experiences in Scouting Thrills: The Memoir of a Scout Officer in the Great War (1919, re-issued by CEF Books in 2003).

He remained with the army after the end of World War I, serving in Egypt. He left the army in March 1926.

== Later life ==
After leaving the army he settled in England, finding work in a sawmill, but within a few short months, on 26 November 1926, he was killed in an industrial accident, leaving a widow who two days later bore him a daughter.

He is buried at Brighton Extra Mural Cemetery, Sussex, England.

== Legacy ==
His Victoria Cross is stored at the Canadian War Museum in Ottawa, Ontario, Canada.

The Church Square of Cagnicourt, France was renamed 'La Place Du Lieutenant George Burdon McKean' in his honour, displaying a plaque to his honour, on 6 September 2003. Cagnicourt is where he earned his Military Cross.

A mountain in the Victoria Cross Ranges is named in his honour.

His name is also present on the memorial wall located in Convocation Hall at the University Of Alberta.

On 29 April 2018, a memorial stone for McKean was unveiled in his birth town of Willington, County Durham.
