= Durham Johnston Comprehensive School =

Location
- Crossgate Moor Durham, County Durham, DH1 4SU; England; 54°46′46″N 1°35′47″W

Information
- Type: Community Comprehensive School
- Motto: Sapere Aude (Dare to Be Wise)
- Established: 1901
- Founder: James Finlay Weir Johnston
- Local authority: Durham
- Department for Education URN: 114312 Tables
- Ofsted: Reports
- Headteacher: Rosslyn McFadden
- Gender: Mixed
- Age: 11 to 18
- Enrolment: 1691
- Houses: Annand, Heaviside, Kenny and Wakenshaw
- Colours: Gold, black, red
- Former name: Johnston Grammar-Technical School
- Website: https://www.durhamjohnston.org.uk

Durham Johnston Comprehensive School is a secondary school in Durham, England.

== Introduction ==
Durham Johnston is a 1700-place 11–18 school serving Durham City and communities beyond to the south and west. It is situated on Crossgate Moor, on the A167 (the former Great North Road). Durham Johnston traces its history to the foundation of a county grammar school for girls and boys in Durham City, partly funded by the will of Susan, widow of James Finlay Weir Johnston, in 1901 in South Street. It is usually oversubscribed and runs on strict admissions criteria based entirely on students' addresses, managed by the County Council.

== History ==
Durham Johnston was founded in 1901 with money left to the County Council by Susan, widow of JFW Johnston who died in 1855. He was a pioneering educator, influential also in the development of Durham University and the colleges which became Newcastle University. He worked to bring education to a wide range of people – rich and poor, male and female – and believed that it should be secular, useful and scientific as well as historical and literary. The first Johnston was, unusually, a mixed grammar technical school until 1918, when a girls’ grammar school was built which is now the Durham Gilesgate Sixth Form Centre.

The Johnston School opened in 1901 with 13 pupils. They came from a range of backgrounds. James Jefferson and William Potts were the sons of schoolmasters, John Wetherell's father was the manager of the City Swimming Baths; Arnold Shaw's father was a clergyman while Mary Martin's father owned Martin's Flour Mill in the City. Elizabeth Herbert's father was a clerk and Lydia Pearson's a signalman. Frances Guthrie was simply described as ‘orphan’.

The first building was in South Street, which was then extended into some former housing and Mr Dean's Stocking Factory. Though the school had a beautiful view it was cold, damp and unsuitable for education. Rebuilding was held up by the second world war but ‘The Johnstonian’ of spring 1948 reported:

The old familiar ring with which the words ‘new school’ were uttered by past Johnstonians is gradually changing to a new and incredulous note of hope. So many annual speech days have been the occasion for references to the inadequacy of the present building, that this year’s announcement that building ought to commence in 1950 was met with qualified applause. It seems too good to be true!' May we respectfully offer two hints to the authorities concerned? First that the consensus of old and present Johnstonians is that the present title of the school should be retained in that it relates to the name of its founder, Professor Johnston. Secondly, that although it is true that hope springs eternal in the human breast it is equally true that hope deferred maketh the heart sick!’

So the third headmaster of the school, Christopher Storey ended his first prize day speech with the words

What the future holds no one can exactly say. The long awaited new building has been promised, but whether it comes about or not the work must and will go on; boys will continue to find here both knowledge and experience and skill of mind and hand and muscle; they will take to heart the school’s motto and courageously seek for wisdom, and the world will be a better place because of their presence in it and their abiding faith in the high standards of work and conduct which the school has ever striven to uphold.

When the school was finally begun in 1950 it was described as

built on a 22 acre green field site at Crossgate Moor alongside the Great North Road … retaining a view of Durham Cathedral from many of the classrooms. ….There would be good facilities for physical training ‘so long yearned for by the masters and boys in the present school’ and up to date accommodation for school meals.

On the school’s 50th anniversary one of the teachers wrote in the Johnstonian

Lest we seem ungrateful to our founder, let us here salute his memory, and pay grateful tribute to all those who helped establish the traditions of the school within the walls of the 50 year old building which we have now outgrown. The safe transplanting of those in new ground will be our privilege and duty when we occupy the new school.

There were 34 boys in the sixth form when the new school opened.

Headmaster Storey’s hope was fulfilled:

Now is the winter of our discontent made glorious summer! Long years of hopes deferred, makeshifts and overcrowding have made of the proposed new school an elusive will-o'-the-wisp, subject for cynical jest, yet the gleam was pursued and at last shines clearly before us, beacon of the promised land! Moreover, the name of our founder will be retained in the title of ‘The Johnston Grammar Technical School’.

Durham Johnston school now is very different. The Johnston community as it is now was put together after 1979 when grammar schools in County Durham were abolished. The Modern Schools in Brandon and Whinney Hill closed, followed by Lansdowne School in Bowburn. Durham Johnston Comprehensive School worked as a split-site school for 30 years with years 7 and 8 at Whinney Hill and years 9 to upper sixth in the Grammar School buildings. (The old annexe buildings were bought in 1968 when the Cottage Homes Orphanage closed, and was fitted out as a sixth form centre which opened in 1969, the year that girls returned to Johnston.)

In 1982, Durham County Council proposed to close the sixth form of the school, and those of Framwellgate Moor and Gilesgate, and create a sixth form college on the site Wearside site of Gilesgate school. Sir Keith Joseph rejected the proposal on the grounds that it would have been too disruptive and costly.

Successive years and governments brought planning blight and hopes deferred once again until the school buildings reached an advances state of dilapidation. However, after the efforts of Head Richard Bloodworth (1999–2004) and Chair of Governors Roberta Blackman-Woods (later MP for the City of Durham) it was rebuilt in 2006-9.

Gordon Brown's Labour Cabinet held a meeting and public consultation in February 2010 and praised the school for its commitment to academic excellence, social justice and global future. It was the first cabinet meeting in the North East, and the first in a school.

In October 1998, it was the first comprehensive school to enter the Financial Times top 1,000 schools.

The new school cost £24m.

== List of headteachers ==
#	Name	Tenure	Notes
1	Sidney Whalley†	July 1901 - 6 March 1928	Retired 1928. Died 7 August 1945.
2	James C. Cleminson†	7 March 1928 - 1936?	Unexplained Leave of Absence.
Acting	Michael Howarth†	9 December 1936	Gave "Annual Report" 1936.
(2)	James C. Cleminson†	1936? - July 1942	Retired 1942. Died February 1946.
Summer Holidays 1942
Acting	Michael Howarth†	September - October 1942	Awaiting the arrival of Dr. Storey.
3	Christopher Storey†	October 1942 - July 1951	Head: Culford School ('51-'71). Retired 1971. Died 27 December 1994.
Summer Holidays 1951
4	John Jepson Egglishaw†	10 September 1951 - July 1965	Retired 1965. Died 1972.
Summer Holidays 1965
Acting	William George Warner†	September 1965 - January 1966	Awaiting the arrival of Mr. Bagley.
5	Benjamin Wallace Bagley†	January 1966 - July 1982	Died 1 March 2018.
Summer Holidays 1982
6	John Ernest Dunford	September 1982 - 1995	OBE for Services to Education (1994). President: SHA (1995-1996).
Acting	Barrie Owens†	1995-1996	Retired July 1997. Died 18 May 2009.
(6)	John Ernest Dunford	1996-1998	Gen. Sec: SHA/ASCL (1998-2010); Review: OCC, for Michael Gove (2010). Chair: Step Together (2010-2018). Chair: Whole Education (2010-2019). Chair: CIEA (2011-2014). Knighted (2014).
Acting	Carolyn Roberts	1998-1999	Awaiting the arrival of Mr. Bloodworth.
7	Richard Bloodworth	1999-2005	
Acting	TBD	2005-2006	Awaiting the arrival of Mrs. Roberts.
8	Carolyn Roberts	2006-2013	Head: Thomas Tallis School ('13-'24). Retired 2024.
Acting	TBD	2013-2014	Awaiting the arrival of Mr. Wardle.
9	Michael Wardle	2014-2017	
Acting	Andrew J. O'Sullivan	2017 - January 2018	Awaiting own appointment as Head.
10	Andrew J. O'Sullivan	January 2018 - 31 August 2024	Newcastle University (2024–present): Lead for Quality & Compliance: Initial Teacher Training Partnership
Acting	Rosslyn McFadden	1 September 2024 - 3 April 2025	Awaiting own appointment as Head.
11	Rosslyn McFadden	4 April 2025 – present	Incumbent.

== Durham Johnston's War Memorial 1921–2011 ==
Durham Johnston in 2011 raised funds to re-site and rededicate the school war memorial, which names 107 men. The majority were members of the Durham Light Infantry, although they served in both wars and in a variety of services and regiments. The memorial was first suggested in a speech by Mr Whalley, the school's Headmaster, in 1920. He referred to the death of Captain C.N. Crawshaw, a teacher at the school who had volunteered when the war broke out in 1914. Mr Whalley proposed a memorial in honour of the 34 former students and one teacher who had died during the Great War. A meeting was held on Wednesday 24 March 1920 for former and current students and £160 was raised towards the cost of the memorial. The original panels of the war memorial were unveiled at 6 p.m. on Saturday 22nd [month?] 1921 by the Bishop of Durham. It was located on the stage of the school, when the school was located in South Street. It acted as a memorial for the 35 ex-Johnstonians who had died during the Great War. In addition to the former students, one member of staff, Mr Crawshaw, had died in action. Two teachers returned to the school after the war, Mr Hutchinson and Mr Dent, and a third, Mr Cousins, returned, but retired, due to war related stress, in 1921.

The unveiling of the memorial was recorded by the Durham Advertiser:

The memorial has been erected by subscriptions from parents, staff past and present and pupils of the school. It consists of a mural panelling in light oak, of classic design, together with a memorial desk and chairs of a similar character. On the memorial desk is a brass inscription plate on which is engraved: ‘A tribute from the boys of 1918–1920 to the Johnstonians who served and fell in the war, 1914–1918.' The design and erection of the memorial have been ably carried out by the North of England School Furnishing Company. In addition to the brass inscription plate there is an engraving which states 'Nothing is here for tears, nothing but fair and well, and what may quiet us in a death so noble.' The motto for the memorial is taken from Milton’s Samson Agonistes. The memorial has been erected in the school assembly hall, and will daily remind the boys of the patriotism and self sacrifices of Johnstonians during the dark days of the war.

A large number of former Johnstonians were involved in World War II with a significant number losing their lives. Two new panels were commissioned for the war memorial and money was, again, raised from contributions. The two panels were dedicated in June 1948 with a ceremony, performed by the Reverend R.F. Morgan – a former student at the school – at St Margaret's Church. A significant amount of money was raised from subscriptions. After the new panels had been paid for the residue of the money was used for a War Memorial prize, which was awarded annually to a high achieving student at the school.

A tradition was established after 1948 that fresh flowers would always be put next to the memorial during term time and that a British Legion wreath of Flanders poppies would be placed next to the memorial on Remembrance Day.

In July 1954 the school moved from its South Street site to new buildings in Crossgate Moor. The memorial was removed in July 1954 and placed upon the left wall in the new school hall. It remained in place until the spring term of 2009, when it was removed and stored in preparation to be rededicated in the new Durham Johnston school hall. It was reinstalled in the third building and dedicated in March 2011 in recognition of the 90th anniversary of the original unveiling, with students and members of the local community raising the money for the initial memorial. A new plaque has been installed with a quotation from the Proverbs to acknowledge money raised by the current students. Local companies, particularly Harrison and Harrison Organ Builders, helped to support this project.

Notable on the war memorial is Captain Isidore Newman, an old boy of the school and linguist who was attached to the SOE during the second world war. He was eventually captured and murdered at Mauthausen Concentration Camp. Because of this, the rededication of the memorial in 2011 was attended by representatives of AJEX, the Association of Jewish Ex-Servicemen and the Rabbi to the Army performed a blessing in the school, as well as the local Anglican Vicar.

- Traditions

The school is named after James Finlay Weir Johnston, a professor of Chemistry at Durham University. He was an autodidact polymath committed to free secular education. Its motto is Sapere Aude, meaning "Dare to be wise".

History and Names in the New Johnston Durham Johnston has a long history – a school on a vital historical site. The new building is large, so the school named some of them after parts of its history.

Johnstonian Names Some areas in the new building are named after James Finlay Weir Johnston (1796–1855) who bequeathed money to set up a school for girls and boys, teaching science and the arts to ordinary young people of Durham, rich or poor.

The main street on the ground floor is James Street, on the first floor is Finlay Street, on the top floor Weir Street. The assembly hall is therefore the James Hall. The quotation outside the door is the name of JFW Johnston's most successful book – an 800-page 2-volume work called ‘The Chemistry of Common Life’. The Library is called Lydia, for Lydia Pearson. She was the first pupil to enter Johnston's first new building in South Street in 1901.

Battlefield Names Some of the areas are named after the great battle of Neville's Cross which was fought on the site in 1346. It was between the English and the Scots: the English won.

The ground floor of the 2-storey block is David Street, named after the defeated Scottish king. The ground floor of the 3-storey block is Edward Street, named after the victorious English king, though he was not at the battle. The PE corridor is called Neville Street after one of the English commanders. He was described in the Lanercost Chronicle as "strong, truthful, cautious and brave". The music and drama corridor is Zouche Street, named after the Archbishop of York, another English military commander. The top floor of the 2-storey block is Douglas Street, named after one of the Scottish commanders. The staff room corridor is called Beaurepaire, the French name for the monastery which then became Bearpark. The Learning Support and Sixth Form corridor is Rokeby Street, named after another English commander. The first floor of the 3-storey block is Mowbray Street, another English commander. The top floor of the 3-storey block is Auld Alliance. That describes the link between the Scots and France, united in attacking England. The single pod venue is Philippa. She was the English queen, much more involved in the battle than Edward.

- Academic performance

In 2010 student Lauren Mincher won the international Saatchi Art prize.

Johnston was inspected by OFSTED in February 2015 and judged 'outstanding'.

== Notable former pupils ==
- Professor Paul Attfield University of Edinburgh
- Sir Kingsley Charles Dunham, geologist, Professor of Geology from 1950 to 1966 at Durham University, President from 1975–7 of the Mineralogical Society and from 1969 to 1972 of the International Union of Geological Sciences
- Trevor Horn, musician and music producer
- Barry Laight, engineer and aircraft designer, who became Technical Director of Blackburn Aircraft, chief designer for the Blackburn Buccaneer, then for Hawker Siddeley, helped design the Hawk (as well as the cancelled supersonic P.1154), and President from 1974 to 1975 of the Royal Aeronautical Society (RAeS)
- Madeleine Moon MP
- Gerry Steinberg, Labour MP from 1987 to 2005 of the City of Durham
- Prof Sir Graham Teasdale, Professor and Head of Department of Neurosurgery from 1981 to 2003 at the University of Glasgow, President from 1994 to 1998 of the International Neurotrauma Society, and from 2000–2 of the Society of British Neurological Surgeons, and invented the Glasgow Coma Scale GCS (with Bryan Jennett)
- John Towers, Chairman of Rover Group from 2000–05 and general manager from 1983 to 1986 of Perkins Engines
- Frederick Willey, Labour MP from 1945 to 1950 for Sunderland and from 1950 to 1983 for Sunderland North
- Prof Thomas D. Wilson, Professor Emeritus at the University of Sheffield, formerly Head of the Department of Information Studies.
- John Pollack, author and speech writer for President Bill Clinton
- Amanda Pritchard, Chief Executive of NHS England
- David Armstrong, footballer
- Josh Charlton, cyclist

== See also ==
- List of schools in Durham
