= North East Learning Trust =

- Founded: January 13, 2011
- Type: Multi-academy trust
- Registration no.: 07492165
- Purpose: Education
- Location: The Academy At Shotton Hall, Passfield Way, Peterlee, SR8 1AU
- Coordinates: 54.9258°N 1.4241°W
- Key people: Lesley Powell, CEO
- Website: www.nelt.co.uk

North East Learning Trust is a multi-academy trust (MAT) that operates nine schools with academy status across northern England: three are primary schools and five are secondary. One is a ITT training school. It is an exempt charity, regulated by the Department for Education.

== History ==
The trust was founded in 2011, growing out of the Shotton Hall single academy trust. It was a founder member of the Northern Alliance of Trusts.

== Academies ==
=== Primary ===
- Browney Primary Academy
- Diamond Hall Junior Academy
- Sacriston Academy

=== Secondary ===
- The Academy at Shotton Hall
- Ashington Academy
- Bedlington Academy
- Easington Academy
- Hermitage Academy
- Rye Hills Academy
- Teesdale School and Sixth Form
