= Bill Blenkiron =

English cricketer (born 1942)

Personal information
- Full name: William Blenkiron
- Born: 21 July 1942 (age 84); Newfield, County Durham, England
- Batting: Right-handed
- Bowling: Right-arm fast-medium
- Role: Bowler

Domestic team information
- Years: Team
- 1964–1974: Warwickshire

Career statistics
Competition	First-class	List A
Matches	118	79
Runs scored	1467	399
Batting average	13.45	9.06
100s/50s	0/2	0/1
Top score	62	51
Balls bowled	17960	3603
Wickets	287	108
Bowling average	28.39	23.36
5 wickets in innings	7	1
10 wickets in match	0	0
Best bowling	5/37	5/27
Catches/stumpings	54/-	19/-
- Source: Cricket Archive, 28 May 2012

William Blenkiron (born 21 July 1942) is a former English cricketer. A right-handed fast-medium bowler, Blenkiron took over 350 wickets in the first-class and one day game in a decade-long career spanning from 1964 to 1974. A useful lower-order right-hand batsman, he also scored 1,467 runs with two half centuries. Though born in Newfield, Durham, his county was Warwickshire (though he did represent his home county in the Minor Counties Championship). His son, Darren Blenkiron, did however play for Durham – and the England U-19 Test team – as a left-handed batsman between 1994 and 1996.

Blenkiron subsequently returned to Durham, where he sold cricket equipment for many years.
