= Sheila Mackie =

English painter

Sheila Gertrude Mackie (1928-2010) was an English artist, illustrator and teacher from Consett, County Durham.

She was born in Chester-le-Street, and studied art at King's College in Newcastle (now Newcastle University). She taught art at Consett Grammar School, where she was head of department from 1950, and also spent many months painting and working at Bertram Mills Circus. In later life she lived at Shotley Bridge where she painted in a caravan studio.

Several of her paintings were bought by the then Derwentside District Council, and are now owned by Durham County Council.

Her Platform 4, Newcastle Station was bought in 1953 for the Government Art Collection.

In the early 1960s she painted two large murals Agony in the Garden and The Conversion of Saul, each 40 feet (12 m) by 12 feet (3.7 m) for the retreat house at the then monastery of Minsteracres; they were known to still exist in 2010 and are listed in the database PostWar Murals Database.

She illustrated books including Julian Glover's Beowulf, Magnus Magnusson's book on the island of Lindisfarne, and books by naturalist David Bellamy.

In 2001 an exhibition of Mackie's work was held at the Durham Art Gallery: it was called "Through the Eyes of a Dragon" because she was born in the Chinese year of the dragon.

Mackie died on 13 September 2010. She had two children and two grandchildren and was divorced.

== Selected publications ==
- Bellamy, David (1983). The Mouse Book: a story of Apodemus, a long-tailed field mouse. Illustrated by Sheila Mackie. Oriel. ISBN 978-0853622000.
- Bellamy, David (1981). The Great Seasons. "presented in words by David Bellamy and in pictures by Sheila Mackie". Hodder & Stoughton. ISBN 0340257202.
- Magnusson, Magnus (1984). Lindisfarne: the cradle island. Illustrated by Sheila Mackie. Oriel Press. ISBN 0853622108.
- Glover, Julian (2005). Beowulf. Illustrated by Sheila Mackie. Sutton. ISBN 0750943114.
