= Whitworth Park Academy =

Location
- Whitworth Lane; Spennymoor; Durham, County Durham, DL16 7LN; England
- Coordinates: 54.6949°N 1.61369°W

Information
- Type: Academy
- Local authority: Durham County Council
- Trust: Advance Learning Partnership
- Department for Education URN: 145564 Tables
- Ofsted: Reports
- Headteacher: Stuart Dixon
- Gender: Co-educational
- Age: 11 to 16
- Website: http://whitworthpark.org.uk/

Whitworth Park Academy is a co-educational secondary school located in Spennymoor, County Durham, England.

== History ==
The school was formerly known as Spennymoor Comprehensive up until 2012, when it merged with Tudhoe Grange School. The school was subsequently renamed Whitworth Park School.

The school moved into new buildings in 2013 that were officially opened by Prince Edward, Duke of Kent.

The school used to operate a sixth form provision which offered a range of A-levels and vocational courses for students. However, in August 2017 the sixth form provision was closed.

In December 2016 Whitworth Park School was rated 'Inadequate' by Ofsted who identified poor achievement and lack of leadership in their report. In 2022, Whitworth Park Academy was rated 'Good' by Ofsted who noted that the school has "undergone significant change since the last inspection".

Previously a foundation school administered by Durham County Council, in September 2018 Whitworth Park School converted to academy status and renamed Whitworth Park Academy. The school is now sponsored by the Advance Learning Partnership.

== Academics ==
Whitworth Park Academy offers GCSEs, BTECs and Cambridge Nationals as programmes of study for pupils.
