= Willington, County Durham =

Village in County Durham, England

Coordinates: 54.71°N 1.69°W

Willington
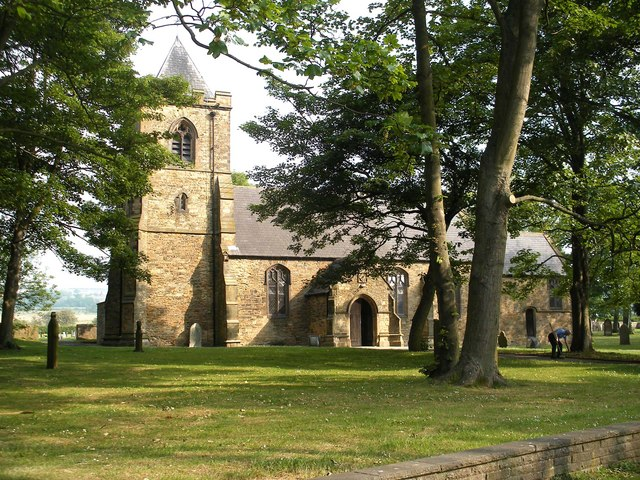

- Location within County Durham
- Population: 5,749 (2011 census)
- OS grid reference: NZ108507
- Civil parish: Greater Willington
- Unitary authority: County Durham
- Ceremonial county: Durham
- Region: North East
- Country: England
- Sovereign state: United Kingdom
- Post town: CROOK
- Postcode district: DL15
- Dialling code: 01388
- Police: Durham
- Fire: County Durham and Darlington
- Ambulance: North East
- UK Parliament: City of Durham

Willington is a town and former civil parish, now in the parish of Greater Willington, in County Durham and the ceremonial county of Durham, England. Willington stands in the foothills of the Pennines and near the River Wear close to Crook, Bishop Auckland and Durham.

Like many communities in the area Willington's economy was largely based on coal mining. The closure of the colliery in 1967 therefore affected the local economy.

The name Willington derives from the Old English wifelingtūn meaning the 'settlement connected with Wifel'.

== Governance ==
Willington is in the electoral ward of Willington and Hunwick. The population of this ward at the 2011 Census was 9,147.

Willington was formerly a township and chapelry in the parish of Brancepeth, from 1866 Willington was a civil parish in its own right, on 1 April 1937 the parish was abolished to form Crook and Willington, part also went to Bishop Auckland. In 1931 that parish had a population of 6644.

== Leisure facilities ==
There are large areas of parkland with play areas in the town.

A leisure centre existed in the village, Spectrum Leisure Centre (a registered charity), but this closed following bankruptcy proceedings in 2024. The centre had a large sports hall, gyms and a bar/refreshment area and hosted events, notably those of Empire Electric Palace Theatre (Crook).

== Education ==
Willington has multiple primary schools and a secondary school.

== Football team ==
Willington has its own football club, Willington A.F.C., who currently play in the 11th tier of English football. Founded in 1906, the club won the Northern League in 1913–14, 1925–26 and 1929–1930, but have struggled more in recent years, having been relegated to the Wearside League where they continued to struggle.

Willington A.F.C. have reached the final of the FA Amateur Cup twice. In 1939, they lost 3–0 to Bishop Auckland at Roker Park, Sunderland. In 1950 Willington beat Bishop Auckland 4–0 at Wembley

== Notable figures ==
George Burdon McKean was born in the village in 1888, moving to Canada in 1902. He returned to England in WW1 as a private soldier in the Canadian Expeditionary Force. His first gallantry award was as an NCO, in 1917, when he won the Military Medal. A year later, as a commissioned officer, he was involved in a trench raid for which he was awarded the Victoria Cross. He was also one of a small number of soldiers to be awarded both the Military Medal & the Military Cross – having served as a both a junior rank and an officer.

His Victoria Cross award was celebrated with the unveiling of a memorial stone in the main street of the village, near to the library.
