= Fyndoune Community College =

Location
- Findon Hill; Sacriston, County Durham, DH7 6LU; England; 54°48′51″N 1°37′24″W

Information
- Type: Community school
- Closed: 2021
- Local authority: Durham
- Department for Education URN: 114289 Tables
- Ofsted: Reports
- Gender: Co-educational
- Age: 11 to 16
- Website: https://www.durhamfederation.net/

Fyndoune Community College was a co-educational secondary school located in Sacriston, County Durham, England. Previous names included Sacriston Secondary Modern School and Fyndoune Comprehensive School. The school closed in April 2021.

== History ==
Fyndoune Community College educated pupils from Sacriston and surrounding villages, including Ushaw Moor, Lanchester, Esh Winning, Witton Gilbert, Langley Park and other areas North of Durham.

Fyndoune Community College was a community school under the control of Durham County Council. It also had specialist status as a Humanities College and had additional facilities for the specialism, including a school farm and a nurture provision.

In September 2009 Fyndoune Community College and Durham Community Business College federated to become one provision - the Durham Federation. The Durham Federation used to include Durham Studio Sixth Form. However, Durham Studio Sixth Form was closed in 2014.

In 2015, Anne Lakey, headteacher of the school, was jailed for eight years after being found guilty of 13 counts of indecent assault after sexual allegations concerning two schoolboys in 1980s.

In Summer 2018, proposals where announced by Durham County Council to move the majority of students to the Ushaw Moor site and Sacriston would only cater for vocational qualifications and students with additional needs. This was met by protests from parents, however the changes still went ahead in the new academic year (September 2018).

In March 2020, a further proposal was announced to merge the two colleges into a single site, following a request by the Department for Education. This was as a result of both schools being rated inadequate by Ofsted in 2014 and being told to find an academy sponsor, which they had failed to do. Both schools where handed back to Durham County Council subject to being merged into a single site.

Between 5 October and 15 November 2020 a consultation was carried out with governors, staff, parents and the wider community. 9 responses where received, with 5 supporting the schools merger and 4 against it. However, the council pointed out the responses against the merger failed to put forward education reasons to keep both schools open.

In a report dated 19 November 2020, the Corporate Director of Children and Young People’s Services used their delegate powers to approve the merger of the colleges sites into a single site - Durham Community Business College with a proposed closure date for the Sacriston site as 12 April 2021.

A further 4 week consultation period started on 26 November and no objections to the plans where received

The closure went ahead on 11 April 2021, one day earlier than expected.

In August 2026, Durham County Council announced plans to redevelop the former college site into a special educational needs (SEND) school.
