= Darren Blenkiron =

English cricketer

Personal information
- Full name: Darren Andrew Blenkiron
- Born: 4 February 1974 (age 52); Solihull, Warwickshire, England
- Batting: Left-handed
- Bowling: Right-arm medium

Domestic team information
- Years: Team
- 1991–1996: Durham

Career statistics
Competition	FC	LA
Matches	19	24
Runs scored	774	396
Batting average	25.80	23.29
100s/50s	3/2	–/2
Top score	145	56
Balls bowled	323	210
Wickets	6	1
Bowling average	31.16	237.00
5 wickets in innings	–	–
10 wickets in match	–	–
Best bowling	4/43	1/25
Catches/stumpings	7/–	4/–
- Source: Cricinfo, 23 December 2009

Darren Andrew Blenkiron (born 4 February 1974 in Solihull, Warwickshire) is a former English cricketer. Blenkiron was a left-handed batsman who bowled right-arm medium pace.

Blenkiron first represented Durham in the 1991 Minor Counties Championship where he made his debut against Hertfordshire. In that season Blenkiron made five appearances, the last of which came against Lincolnshire. During the 1991 season Blenkiron also made his one-day debut against Glamorgan in the NatWest Trophy.

In 1992 Blenkiron played single Youth Test for England against Pakistan. In the same series Blenkiron played three Youth One Day Internationals against Pakistan. These matches would be Blenkiron's only international appearances.

In 1992 Durham were elevated to first-class status, gaining them entry to the County Championship. In 1993 Blenkiron made a single one-day appearance for Durham against Somerset.

In 1994 Blenkiron made his first-class debut against Worcestershire, in Durhams final County Championship match of that season. Blenkiron played 19 first-class matches for Durham, with his final appearance coming against Leicestershire in the 1996 season. Blenkiron played 24 one-day matches for the club as well, with his final one-day appearance coming against Leicestershire in the same season. Blenkiron was released by Durham at the end of the 1996 season.

In first-class cricket Blenkiron scored 774 runs at an average of average of 25.80 with two half-centuries and three centuries to his name, with a high score of 145. With medium pacers Blenkiron took six wickets at an average of 31.16, with best figures of 4-43. In List-A cricket Blenkiron scored 396 runs at an average of 23.29, with a highest score of 56.

In 2001 Blenkiron played six Minor Counties Trophy matches for the Durham Cricket Board.

Blenkiron's father, Bill Blenkiron, played for Warwickshire from 1964 until 1974.
