= Consett Academy =

Location
- Ashdale Road; Consett, County Durham, DH8 6LZ; England; 54.8412°N 1.869°W

Information
- Type: Academy
- Motto: Inclusion Progression Excellence
- Established: January 2012
- Local authority: Durham
- Department for Education URN: 137638 Tables
- Ofsted: Reports
- Head Teacher: Tom Urwin
- Gender: Co-educational
- Age: 11 to 18
- Enrolment: 1233
- Website: http://www.consett-academy.org.uk

Consett Academy is a secondary academy school in Consett, the result of a merger between Consett Community Sports College and Moorside Community Technology College.

== History ==
=== Consett Community Sports College ===
Consett Community Sports College was in the Blackhill area of Consett. The site had originally been Consett Grammar School. At the time of closure Consett Community Sports College had a capacity of 985. The last head was Christine Parker. In 2006 it had 750 pupils.

The school had been previously known as Blackfyne Comprehensive School. In 1970 Blackfyne had 650 pupils and was described as a "Mixed Grammar Technical type".

=== Moorside Community Technology College ===
Moorside Community Technology College was in the Moorside area of Consett. It was opened in 1959 as Moorside Secondary Modern School; the head at that time was W. Ellison. At the time of closure the school's capacity was 600. Based on the 2007 GCSE results, it was categorised as a failing school. The following year its GCSE results made it the second most improved school in the country.

=== Consett Academy ===
The academy was originally planned to be funded under Building Schools for the Future (BSF), but plans were delayed with the cancellation of BSF. In 2010 an Early Day motion called on the government to "release the funding for the much-wanted and prepared-for academy school for the area, putting an end to the anxious wait of all concerned".

The school was sponsored as an academy by New College Durham and Durham County Council. New College Durham is also the academy sponsor for North Durham Academy.

Consett Academy opened in January 2012, initially across the two sites of its predecessor schools. In September 2015 the school moved to purpose-built buildings on Consett's former football ground, co-located with a new city leisure centre.

== Academic results ==
In 2010, 57% of Year 11 pupils at Consett Community Sports College and 63% of those at Moorside Community College attained five or more GCSEs at grades A*-C including English and mathematics.

In 2017, 24% of Year 11 pupils attained Grade 5 or above in English and maths GCSEs, compared to the Durham local authority average of 35% and the national average of 40%.

The average A level points score for sixth-form pupils in 2017 was 32, in line with the local authority and national averages. The percentage of Consett Academy sixth-formers going on to university in 2017 was 79%, compared to 50% in the local authority and 51% nationally.

== Ofsted judgements ==
At the closure of the preceding schools, Consett Community Sports College had been judged Satisfactory and Moorside Community Technology College had been judged Good.

Blackfyne Community School, the predecessor of Consett Community Sports College, had last been inspected in 2004 and judged Good.

Consett Academy was first inspected in 2013 and judged to Require Improvement. It was inspected again in 2016 and judged Good.

== School uniform ==
There was controversy in 2016 about the school's decision temporarily to exclude pupils for not wearing the correct uniform. Despite this, the school's policies have not changed as of 2024.

== Notable pupils and staff ==
=== Consett Grammar School ===
- Alun Armstrong, actor
- Christopher Lowson, bishop
- Sheila Mackie, art teacher at the school; artist
- Sir Alan Campbell (politician), British politician, Labour Member of Parliament and Cabinet Minister.

=== Blackfyne Comprehensive School ===
- Paul Collingwood, cricketer
- Denise Welch, actor
