= Parkside Academy =

Location
- Hall Lane Estate; Willington; DL15 0QF; England
- Coordinates: 54.70675°N 1.68994°W

Information
- Type: Academy
- Department for Education URN: 137903 Tables
- Ofsted: Reports
- Head teacher: Kelly Armstrong
- Gender: Coeducational
- Age: 11 to 16
- Enrolment: 881 (Max Capacity: 900) (Nov 2025)
- Website: https://parksideacademy.org.uk/

Parkside Academy (formerly Parkside School and then Parkside Sports College), is a coeducational secondary school with academy status, located in Hall Lane Estate, Willington, Crook, County Durham, England.

Parkside teaches a wide range of standard, and specialist curriculum subjects as well as a multitude of after school activities. It is a well known community association and hosts a state of the art Gym and activities for youths under 16. The school specializes in Information Technology and Physical Education.
