= South Stanley =

Village in County Durham, England

Coordinates: 54.865°N 1.694°W

- Location within County Durham
- OS grid reference: NZ197522
- Unitary authority: County Durham
- Ceremonial county: County Durham
- Region: North East
- Country: England
- Sovereign state: United Kingdom
- Post town: Durham
- Postcode district: DH9
- Dialling code: 01207
- Police: Durham
- Fire: County Durham and Darlington
- Ambulance: North East

South Stanley is a village in County Durham, in England. It is situated immediately to the south of Stanley.
