= Adrian Dickson =

British television personality (born 1977)

Adrian Dickson (born 1977) is a South-African born British television and radio host.

He began his career after graduating from a university degree course in broadcast journalism. His first television appearances were for CBBC on BBC Television. He presented CBBC Presentation In Studio 9 he also become the sole presenter for BBC Choice children's strand CBBC on Choice in November 2000 and Sub Zero as well as host non-children's programmes Top of the Pops and its sister show Top of the Pops @ Play. In 2002 he went on to front and co-produce the UK Top 40 for the CBBC Channel, a weekly rundown of the music charts. For radio, he presented shows for BBC Radio 3 and BBC 7 as well as independent local radio. Late in 2004 he became an international showbusiness reporter and producer for E! Entertainment Television.

Adrian hosted shows for Rapture TV, was a continuity announcer for UKTV and reported on London West End Theatre news for the Heathrow Express Train Service.

In 2005 he created a media production company which produces entertainment news shows for Britain's Channel 4 and websites worldwide. The company is also the market leader in creating presenter showreels.

Adrian is now the UK bureau chief for US channel ReelzChannel and also reports for Fox Television stations.
