= WISE Academies =

Wise Academies Trust
- Founded: February 8, 2011
- Type: Multi-academy trust
- Registration no.: 07521946
- Purpose: Education
- Location: Borodin Avenue, Sunderland SR5 4NX
- Coordinates: 54.9258°N 1.4241°W
- Key people: Zoe Carr, CEO; Fiona Hardie, former CFO
- Website: wiseacademies.co.uk

Wise Academies Trust formerly the Bexhill and Town End Academies Limited is a multi-academy trust (MAT) that operates twelve schools with academy status across northern England: all are primary schools. It is an exempt charity, regulated by the Department for Education.

== Philosophy ==
Headteachers should be leaders of learning, and issues of finance, estate management, governance, HR and IT should be handled by a shared back-office team of professionals. Getting the correct leadership in place is important. The CEO will fill in as a headteacher if necessary until the right candidate is found. Children must start the primary school ready to learn; this means enabling them with quality pre-school education, giving each child the experiences provided by the most advantaged parents. Pre-schools are set up and use the Launchpad to Literacy skills based approach. Attendance problems challenge progress. One method of being pro-active is to use a walking bus that is led by a teacher.

== History ==
The trust was founded in 2011 with just two school and expanded to take on Hastings Hill and over extended itself to take on Welbeck which has financial difficulties. The CEO came back from maternity leave in 2013 and employed a qualified accountant, Fiona Hardie, as Chief Financial Officer. They established a new professional accounting system whereby all the schools used one central finance office- and the only delegated power was petty cash, and that had a top limit of £50. Though salaries was outsourced, financial planning was done by the finance officer. In one school, with falling rolls the salaries used up 103% of the budget. The finances were sorted by creating two mixed classes; years 3-4 and 5–6. Two teachers were redeployed to other schools in the academy.

Carr received an OBE that December. More schools joined WISE, none were refused because of demographics or location, but only when the member schools didn't have the financial capability to absorb them.

In a YouTube video made for Department for Education (DfE) in 2017, Carr and Hardie explained the approach they used in the next four years. As more schools joined the group, more staff were taken on centrally to handle the complex education bureaucracy.

== Academies ==
These are all primary academies.

- Bexhill
- Town End
- Welbeck
- Hastings Hill
- Haltwistle
- Prudhoe West
- Adderlane
- Croftway
- Shaftoe Trust
- Northview
- Malvin's Close
- Morpeth Road
- Town End Teaching School Alliance
