= Alfred Blenkiron =

British flying ace (1896–1920)

Alfred Victor Blenkiron
- Born: 4 July 1896; Birmingham, England
- Died: 20 March 1920 (aged 23); Coulsdon, Surrey, England
- Military career
- Allegiance: United Kingdom
- Branch: British Army; Royal Air Force
- Service years: 1915–1918
- Rank: Lieutenant
- Units: Somerset Light Infantry; No. 22 Squadron RFC; No. 23 Squadron RFC; No. 25 Squadron RFC; No. 56 Squadron RFC; No. 151 Squadron RAF
- Awards: Military Cross

Lieutenant Alfred Victor Blenkiron MC (4 July 1896 – 20 March 1920) was a British World War I flying ace credited with five aerial victories.

== Military service ==
Blenkiron was commissioned as a temporary second lieutenant in the Prince Albert's (Somerset Light Infantry) regiment on 19 October 1915.

He joined the Royal Flying Corps, being appointed a flying officer (observer) on 15 November 1916, with seniority from 21 March 1916.

He flew as an observer with No. 22 Squadron on the Western Front from 17 March to 8 August 1916, as an observer/gunner in the front of a FE.2b pusher.

He then served with No. 23 Squadron from 5 to 14 October 1916, transferring to No. 25 Squadron on 3 December 1916, again as an observer on the FE.2b. He scored his first success by destroying a Halberstadt D.III on 23 January 1917. Six days later, he scored a kill despite being wounded, setting an Albatros D.II aflame; on 3 March 1917, he was awarded the Military Cross for this action.

On 1 March 1917, Blenkiron was promoted to lieutenant.

After recovering from his wound he trained as a pilot, and was appointed a flying officer on 10 November 1917. He was assigned to No. 56 Squadron on 3 December 1917. Flying the Royal Aircraft Factory SE.5a he scored two victories with No. 56, driving down an Albatros D.V on 15 December 1917 and a German two-seater on 25 January 1918. He was later transferred back to England as one of the original pilots of No. 151 Squadron, the RAF's first dedicated night fighter squadron.

He accompanied this unit back into combat in France, and flying Sopwith Camel No. D9577, and forced down a Friedrichshafen G.III of Bogohl 3, which was captured.

== Honours and awards ==
Military Cross
Temporary Second Lieutenant Alfred Victor Blenkiron, Somerset Light Infantry and Royal Flying Corps.
For conspicuous gallantry in action. Although wounded, he fired his machine-gun with great skill and brought down an enemy machine, thereby enabling his pilot to bring his machine safely home. On another occasion he displayed great courage when observing on patrol, and brought down a hostile machine.

== Post-war and death ==
Blenkiron struggled after returning to civilian life, having a nervous breakdown, and losing much of his money to card sharps. He was declared bankrupt on 20 February 1919, and was charged with fraud in obtaining credit while bankrupt. On 20 March 1920, Blenkiron was found dead in a room at the Ashdown Park Hotel, Coulsdon, Surrey. At the inquest it was revealed that Blenkiron, a professional dancer, had separated from his wife and was under financial pressure, and had committed suicide by taking prussic acid.
