= Hope Wood Academy =

Coordinates: 54.7898°N 1.3362°W

Location
- Crawlaw Road; Easington Colliery, County Durham, SR8 3LP; England

Information
- Type: Special school; Academy
- Local authority: Durham County Council
- Trust: Ascent Academies’ Trust
- Department for Education URN: 138718 Tables
- Ofsted: Reports
- Head: Adele Pearson-Atkinson
- Gender: Coeducational
- Age: 2 to 19
- Website: http://www.hopewood.org.uk/

Hope Wood Academy is an academy based in Easington Colliery, County Durham. The school caters for pupils aged 2–19 with Special Educational Needs.

Originally known as Glendene School, it converted to academy status since September 2012 and was renamed Glendene Arts Academy. It was formally reopened by Prince Philip, the Duke of Edinburgh following a £2.3 million refurbishment.

In 2014, a report was released by the Education Funding Agency—who are responsible for funding and monitoring the finances of free schools and academies—alleging financial mismanagement and demanding the school repay £162,000 of taxpayers' money. A spokesperson said that the school had engaged in a "serious mismanagement of funds" Following the publication of the report, three people connected to the school were arrested by police on suspicion of fraud and released on bail. No such irregularities were found and all charges against the three individuals were subsequently dropped without any action being taken.

The school has since been renamed Hope Wood Academy and is now sponsored by the Ascent Academies’ Trust.
