= Sacriston =

Village in County Durham, England

Coordinates: 54.817°N 1.626°W

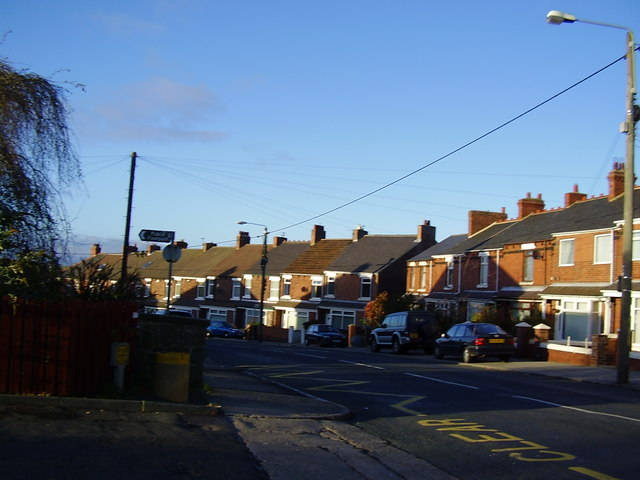
- Main road through Sacriston

- Location within County Durham
- Population: 4,999 2011 census
- OS grid reference: NZ240470
- Unitary authority: County Durham
- Ceremonial county: Durham
- Region: North East
- Country: England
- Sovereign state: United Kingdom
- Post town: DURHAM
- Postcode district: DH7
- Dialling code: 0191
- Police: Durham
- Fire: County Durham and Darlington
- Ambulance: North East
- UK Parliament: North Durham

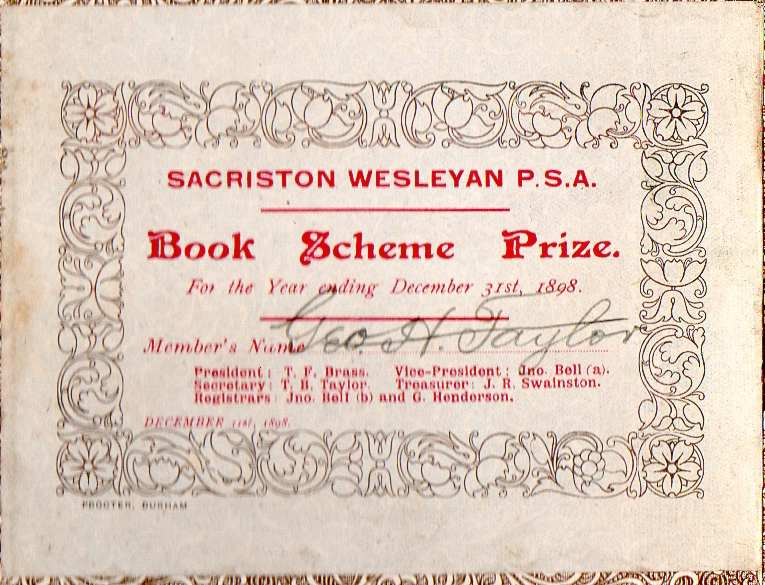
Bookplate of a Sacriston Wesleyan P.S.A. Book Scheme Prize awarded to George Taylor on 31 December 1898 from an 1890 edition of Gulliver's Travels and Other Works

Sacriston is a village, civil parish and electoral ward in County Durham, England, situated 3 miles (4.8 km) north of the city of Durham. The area has been populated since the Bronze Age.

== History ==
=== Early history ===
The Sacriston area has been populated since the Bronze Age, but the first recorded settlement dates back to the 13th century, to Sacristan's Heugh. According to old maps this was once known as "Segerston Heugh", and is now known to local people as "Segga". This farm and manor house was once the residence of the Sacristan, a monk who held the Office of the Sacristan of the monastery at Durham Cathedral. The Sacristan was responsible for providing everything necessary for the services of the cathedral: bread and wine, the vestments etc. He was also responsible for repairs to Durham Cathedral. The funds for carrying out the official duties were generated from the estate of Sacristan's Heugh, which was finally demolished shortly after World War II.

=== Mining history ===
Sacriston Colliery shaft was sunk in 1838 and by the 1890s, the pit employed 600 men, producing 1,000 tons of coal a day. A Wesleyan chapel was built in 1865. The population in 1870-72 was calculated as 2,106, and many of the local inhabitants were said to be employed in the mines.

==== Disaster of 1903 ====
On Monday 16 November 1903, water flooded into the 3rd West district of the 'Busty' Seam. The inrush killed two miners, John Whittaker (25) and Thomas McCormick (52). McCormick family tradition (source Harry McCormick) is that Thomas McCormick's son Gregory had to be restrained from rushing into the flood. When the workings were pumped out another man, Robert Richardson was found on Friday standing on his coal tub having been stranded in the dark, surrounded by dirty flood water for 92 hours.

"The inquest was opened by Mr. Coroner Graham on the 20th November and adjourned till the 9th December when evidence was taken, and the jury returned a verdict that the two men were accidentally drowned, and that, owing to the peculiar circumstances, no blame attached to the management."

The Royal Humane Society awarded a silver medal to six mine officials. The enquiry lasted just five hours. See the Durham County Advertiser news report.

Miners themselves have not all been convinced that the management was innocent or that the medals were appropriate. There have been suggestions that cover-ups were commonplace. Decades later workers stumbled on the skeleton of one of the pit ponies that died during the accident and a full tub of coal that still bore a miners token (miners were on piece work). The miner then received his back pay.

==== Disaster of 1940 ====
On 4 December 1940, a fall of stone on one of the work areas killed 5 miners. They were:

Joseph Welsh, 46
George W. Scott, 39
William Richardson, 50
William Smith, 40
John William Britton, 47

The sole survivor was George Watt, 49. He suffered severe spinal and leg injuries but later returned to work.

=== Decline and eradication of mining ===
As a result of the exhaustion of thick coal seams, only 1,500 tons of best quality coal was being produced a week in 1979. The last coal production was on 15 November 1985 and the colliery closed on 28 December 1985. As in many mining areas, the loss of the 'pit' led to significant unemployment and related social problems. Sacriston narrowly avoided D classification in 1985 due to social deprivation and general poor quality of housing. Little evidence of the mining operations now remains, with the area around the former coal mine having been landscaped and turned into woodland. A few mining-related buildings do survive, the largest of which is now used as a depot for the local authority's refuse vehicles, while the foundations of demolished mine buildings can be seen in places in the new woodland. Sacriston Wood is now a 30 hectares (74 acres) local nature reserve.

== Governance ==
An electoral ward in the same name exists. The total population of this ward taken at the 2011 census was 6,613.

== Life in Sacriston today ==
More than 25 years after the closure of its last coal mine, the village retains a strong sense of community. Recently, a new community centre has opened, and the village has started to shake off its coal mining past. The village has a travel agent and a Post Office along with a large number of shops for a village of its size, including mini-marts, a greengrocer, newsagent, barber shop, off-licence many takeaway shops and others. There are also two social clubs and similar organisations including Sacriston Working Mens Club and a Roman Catholic (now closed), cricket club and one remaining public house.

== Education ==
The village has two schools, one of which is a Roman Catholic primary school, and the other is Sacriston Academy. Sacriston Academy opened on 1 September 2014 when, after a public consultation, the junior school closed and the infant school extended its age range and changed its name to Sacriston Academy.

The village used to have a secondary school, Fyndoune Community College. This school closed in 2021.

There was another infant school that fed Sacriston Juniors called Plawsworth Road Infant School which closed in 2013 due to falling pupil numbers. It has since been demolished and houses were built on the site.

== Public services ==
A new health centre, which includes a dental practice as well as a GP surgery, was officially opened by Sir Bobby Robson in 2008. This facility was constructed on the site of the village's former swimming baths, which closed in the 1990s.

In July 2009 the Northern Integrative Health Practice (NIHP Sacriston Practice) opened in the vacated GP surgery building on Sacriston Crossroads. Offering services that complement traditional healthcare, the newly renovated building will also include an out-patients centre for Sunderland Eye Infirmary from January 2010.

== Notable people ==
- Melvyn Betts (born 1975), ex Durham, Warwickshire and Middlesex cricketer, born in Sacriston.
- Ian Hunter (cricketer) (born 1979), ex Durham and now Derby cricketer, educated at Fyndoune Community College, Sacriston.
- Wendy Craig (born 1934), English actress, born in Sacriston
- Sir Bobby Robson (1933–2009), football player and manager, born in Sacriston.
- Kevan Jones (born 1964), Member of Parliament for the area, lives in Sacriston, where he also has his constituency office.
