= The Academy at Shotton Hall =

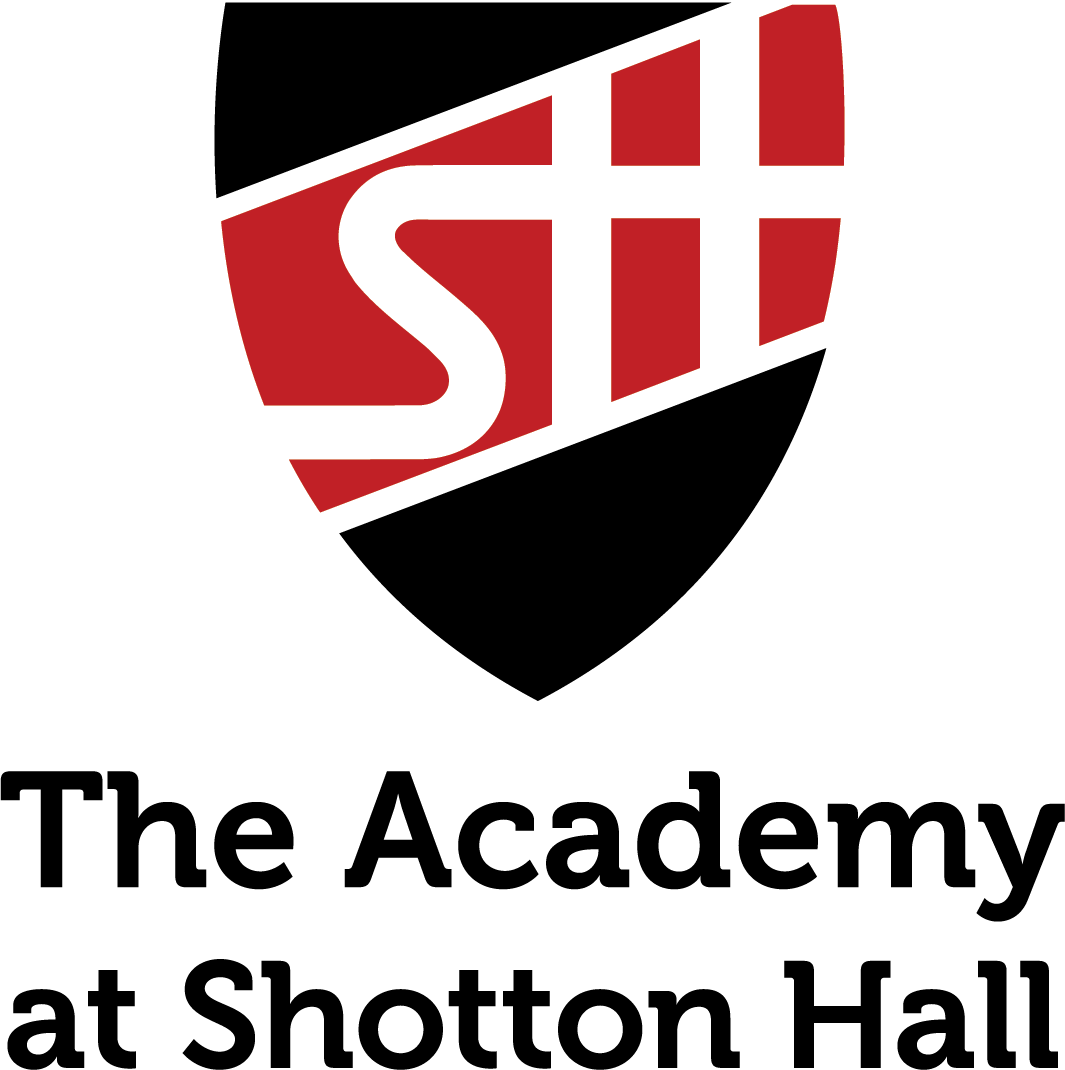

Location
- Passfield Way; Peterlee, County Durham, SR8 1NX; England; 54.749°N 1.349°W

Information
- Former name: Shotton Hall Comprehensive School, Shotton Hall Secondary Modern School
- Type: Academy
- Motto: Where every child experiences excellence every day
- Religious affiliation: Mixed
- Established: 1963
- Local authority: Durham County Council
- Trust: North East Learning Trust
- Department for Education URN: 136451 Tables
- Ofsted: Reports
- Chair of governors: Amanda Moon
- Executive Headteacher: Lesley Powell (Executive Principal)
- Headteacher: Alex Hook
- Age: 11 to 16
- Enrolment: 1204
- Website: www.shottonhallacademy.co.uk

The Academy At Shotton Hall is a coeducational secondary school in Peterlee, County Durham, England. It is a school for 11- to 16-year-olds and is a specialist Performing Arts College it was renamed to Academy of Shotton Hall in February 2011. The school has recently given through major renovation work as part of the Government's Building Schools for the Future (BSF) program. The new facility was fully rebuilt in late 2010 and the former facility was demolished in mid 2011. The current head teacher at the school is Miss Hook. Previous head teacher, Ian Mowbray, retired In July 2010.

== History ==
Shotton Hall School was first opened in 1963 as a secondary modern school, but in 1973 it became a comprehensive school and it was extended with new buildings such as the B block, the Towers, Speed, Metcalfe and Nicholson house blocks, the art block, the music block and the sports hall. The school was granted Specialist Performing Arts College status in 2003. Recently, the school has applied for "Fast track academy" Status and on 1 February 2011, was renamed The Academy At Shotton Hall.

== Alumni ==
- J. P. E. Harper-Scott, musicologist and professor at Royal Holloway, University of London attended the comprehensive school carnation.
- Courtney Hadwin, singer.
- Connor Lawson, actor of Alex Walker in The Dumping Ground and Billy Elliot in the West End fame.
- Chris Brown, football player also attended the school.
