= Sedgefield Community College =

Coordinates: 54.658°N 1.444°W

Location
- Hawthorn Road; Sedgefield, County Durham, TS21 3DD; England

Information
- Type: Academy
- Established: c. 1962
- Local authority: Durham County Council
- Trust: The Laidlaw Schools Trust
- Department for Education URN: 147670 Tables
- Ofsted: Reports
- Gender: Coeducational
- Age: 11 to 16
- Website: sedgefield.laidlawschoolstrust.co.uk

Sedgefield Community College, part of the Laidlaw Schools Trust, is a coeducational secondary school located in Sedgefield in County Durham, England.

== History ==
The school takes in students from most of the surrounding places including Sedgefield itself, Fishburn, Trimdon, Trimdon Grange, Trimdon Station, Trimdon Colliery, Coxhoe, Bishop Middleham, and West Cornforth and individual students travel in from a much wider area.

The original 1960s era school buildings closed on 17 December 2010 and were replaced on the same site with a new build school.

Unusually, the original school had its own farm, which had British saddleback, Jacob sheep, assorted hens, ducks and a range of other animals. The farm closed when the new school building was opened.

In 2003 the school was visited by former American President George W. Bush as part of a visit to former Prime minister Tony Blair's constituency.

Previously a community school administered by Durham County Council, in March 2020 converted to academy status. The school is now sponsored by The Laidlaw Schools Trust.

The school was awarded world class school status in 2020 and is known as one of the best schools in County Durham and the whole region. It was named the best secondary school in the country in the Tes Schools Awards 2021.

== In the media ==
In 2021, Sedgefield Community College was featured in the BBC One documentary Paddy and Christine McGuinness: Our Family and Autism

== Notable pupils ==
- Jordan Nobbs, footballer who has played for Sunderland Ladies, Arsenal Women and the England women's national football team.
