= Teesdale School =

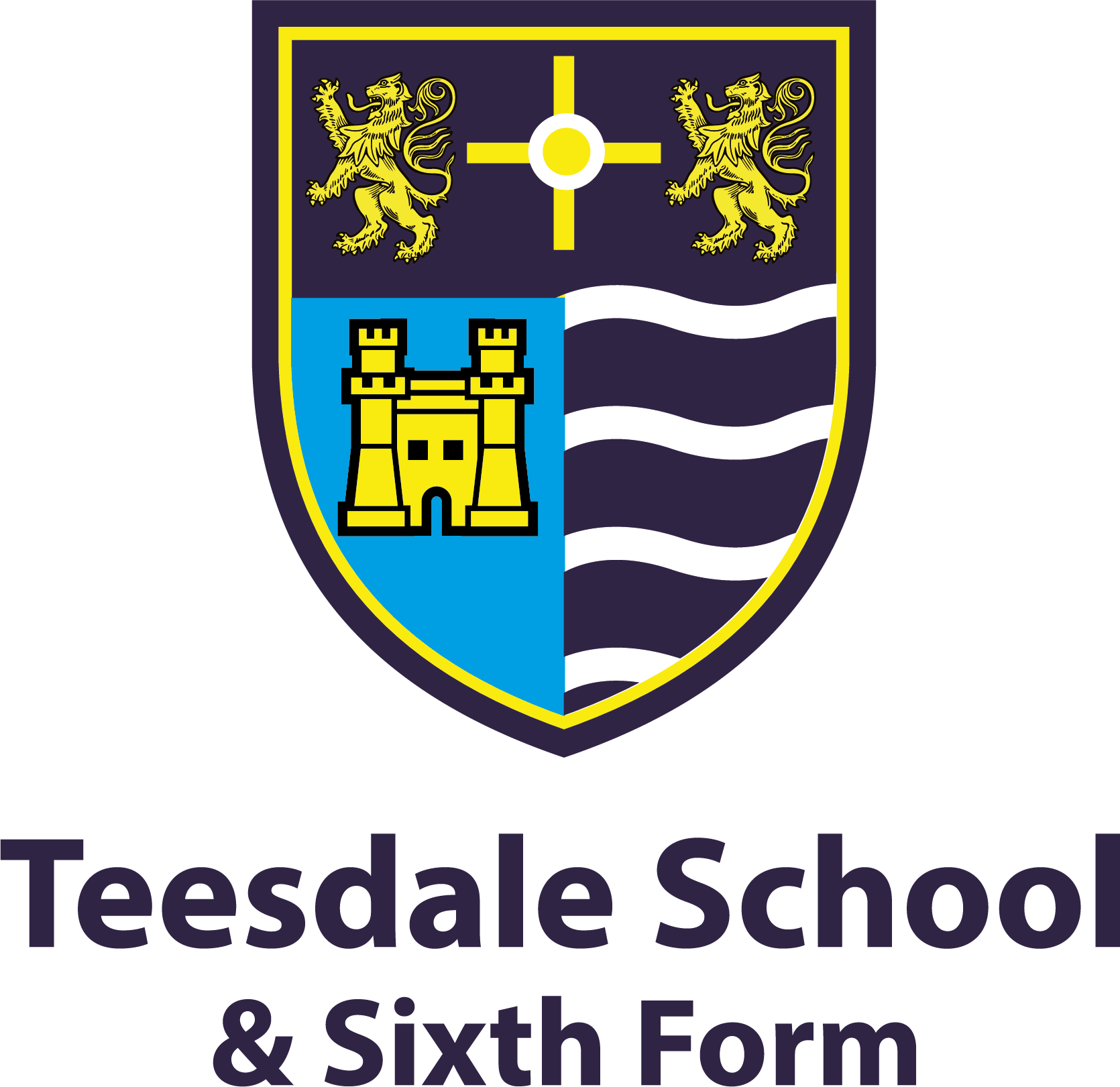

Location
- Prospect Place; Barnard Castle, County Durham, DL12 8HH; England
- Coordinates: 54.550°N 1.913°W

Information
- Type: Academy
- Trust: North East Learning Trust
- Department for Education URN: 144496 Tables
- Ofsted: Reports
- Chair: Lindsay Haggis
- Head teacher: Hijab Zaheer
- Gender: Coeducational
- Age: 11 to 18
- Houses: Franklin, Maxwell, Austen, Shakespeare, Richardson
- Website: www.teesdaleschool.co.uk

Teesdale School is a secondary school and sixth form with academy status located in Barnard Castle, County Durham, England. It offers subjects from GCSE to Advanced Subsidiary Level and Advanced Level.

== Location ==
Teesdale School is on the A688, on the outskirts of Barnard Castle, just north of the A66.
