= Newfield, Chester-le-Street =

Village in County Durham, England

Coordinates: 54.866°N 1.617°W

Newfield
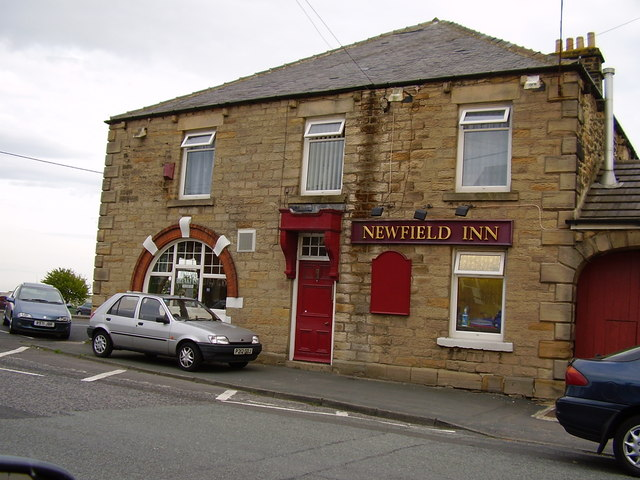
- Newfield Inn

- Location within County Durham
- Area: 0.2614 km^{2} (0.1009 sq mi)
- Population: 1,529 (2021 census)
  - Density: 5,849/km^{2} (15,150/sq mi)
- Unitary authority: County Durham
- Ceremonial county: County Durham
- Region: North East
- Country: England
- Sovereign state: United Kingdom

Newfield is a village in County Durham, England. It lies west of the town of Chester-le-Street, and falls partly within the civil parish of Pelton. In 2021 it had a population of 1529.

Its services include the following: a mobile post office, primary school with a good Ofsted rating with some outstanding features, pub, beauty salon, a dental surgery, bakery/cafe and a lunch time take away cafe.

It also has won silver two years in a row in the RHS In bloom awards. This is a semi-rural area with great access to Newcastle upon Tyne, Durham, Sunderland and the market town of Chester-le-Street.
