= Deaf Hill =

Village in County Durham, England

Coordinates: 54.7232°N 1.4126°W

- Location within County Durham
- OS grid reference: NZ379366
- Civil parish: Trimdon Foundry
- Unitary authority: County Durham
- Ceremonial county: County Durham
- Region: North East
- Country: England
- Sovereign state: United Kingdom
- Post town: TRIMDON STATION
- Postcode district: TS29
- Dialling code: 01429
- Police: Durham
- Fire: County Durham and Darlington
- Ambulance: North East
- UK Parliament: Newton Aycliffe & Spennymoor

Deaf Hill is a village in County Durham, England. It is situated a short distance to the east of Trimdon Colliery. The origin of the name is not known. The alternative name for the village is Trimdon Station. Locally Deaf Hill is thought to have been originally called Death Hill, the name originating from a belief that if children were passed through the fork of a sycamore tree in the area they would be cured of diphtheria, however they died and the spot was called Death Hill. The name was changed as more people settled there.

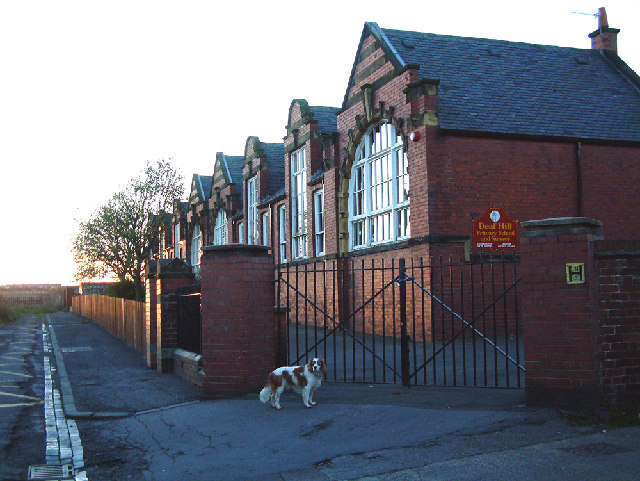
Deaf Hill Primary School

According to Trimdon Snippets, "No one can really find out the origin of the word Deaf Hill. The nearest solution I think is when land did not yield much, it was called "deef" or dead (deed) land". The rising land behind the pit is called Sleepy Hill.
