= Pelton, County Durham =

Village and electoral ward in County Durham, England

Coordinates: 54.8731°N 1.6078°W

Pelton
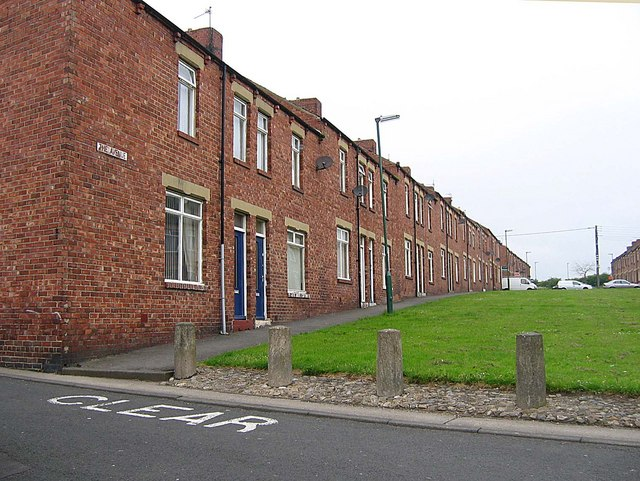
- The Avenue, Pelton

- Location within
- Population: 8,250
- OS grid reference: NZ252635
- Unitary authority: County Durham
- Ceremonial county: County Durham
- Region: North East
- Country: England
- Sovereign state: United Kingdom
- Post town: CHESTER-LE-STREET
- Postcode district: DH2
- Dialling code: 0191
- Ambulance: North East
- UK Parliament: North Durham

Pelton is a village and electoral ward in County Durham, England. The population of the village and ward taken at the 2011 census was 8,250. It is located 1.8 miles (2.9 km) north-west of Chester-le-Street and 4 miles (6.4 km) east of Stanley; the village of West Pelton lies to the west of the village.

== Toponymy ==
Pelton traces its origins to Saxon times, although the meaning of the name is disputed. It could mean 'village with a palisade' or 'village near the shovel-shaped hill'.

== History ==
In 1320, Pelton had belonged to the Burdon family and passed to the Redhughs, Whelpingtons and the Nevilles, whose lands were forfeited in 1569.

In the late 1600s, Pelton was divided into several freeholds; proprietors included Lambton, the Earl of Durham and Charles Joliffe. By the late 19th century, principal owners of land, mostly through coal mining interests, were the Joliffes, Calverley Bewickes, Lambtons and Fenwicks.

Pelton Colliery, in nearby Pelton Fell, was opened in 1835; it brought a growth in population in the 19th century, but there was already a substantial mining population in the area from the 18th century. An explosion at the colliery on 21 October 1866 killed 24 men and boys. It was closed in 1965.

In addition, West Pelton Colliery was opened in 1858 and closed in 1921.

== Geography ==
Most of the village lies within the River Tyne catchment area, close to a tributary of the River Team, which joins the Tyne in Dunston. The remainder of the village lies within the River Wear catchment area, close to the Cong Burn, which joins the Wear in Chester-le-Street.

== Amenities ==
Local schools in the area include Pelton primary school.

Pelton has a newly built community centre, updated in 2012. There is one public house and a small range of shops, including a Co-op, three general stores, a post office, chemist, some take-away food outlets and some hair salons.

The village has two parks, a doctors' surgery, a dentist and a library.

== Governance ==
The village is governed locallly by the Pelton Parish Council.

The MP for the North Durham parliamentary constituency is Luke Akehurst of the Labour Party.

== Transport ==
Pelton is served by bus routes provided by Go North East, which connect the village with Stanley, Sunderland, Newcastle-upon-Tyne, Chester-le-Street and Consett.

Pelton railway station served the village between 1860 and 1955 on the Stanhope and Tyne Railway. The nearest National Rail station is at Chester-le-Street, on the East Coast Main Line.

== Notable people ==
- Thomas Hepburn (1795–1864) – English coal miner and trade union leader
- Maxine Robinson (1968–) – serial killer mother who confessed to her crimes in 2004
- Alan White (1949–2022) – drummer with the band Yes.
