= Quarrington =

Quarrington may refer to:

== People ==
- Joel Quarrington, Canadian double bassist (born 1955)
- Paul Quarrington, Canadian novelist (born 1953)

== Places ==
- Cassop-cum-Quarrington, County Durham, England
- Old Quarrington, County Durham, England
- Quarrington Hill, County Durham, England
- Quarrington, Lincolnshire, England

== See also ==
- Quarrendon (disambiguation)
