= Old Quarrington =

Coordinates: 54.73433°N 1.49921°W

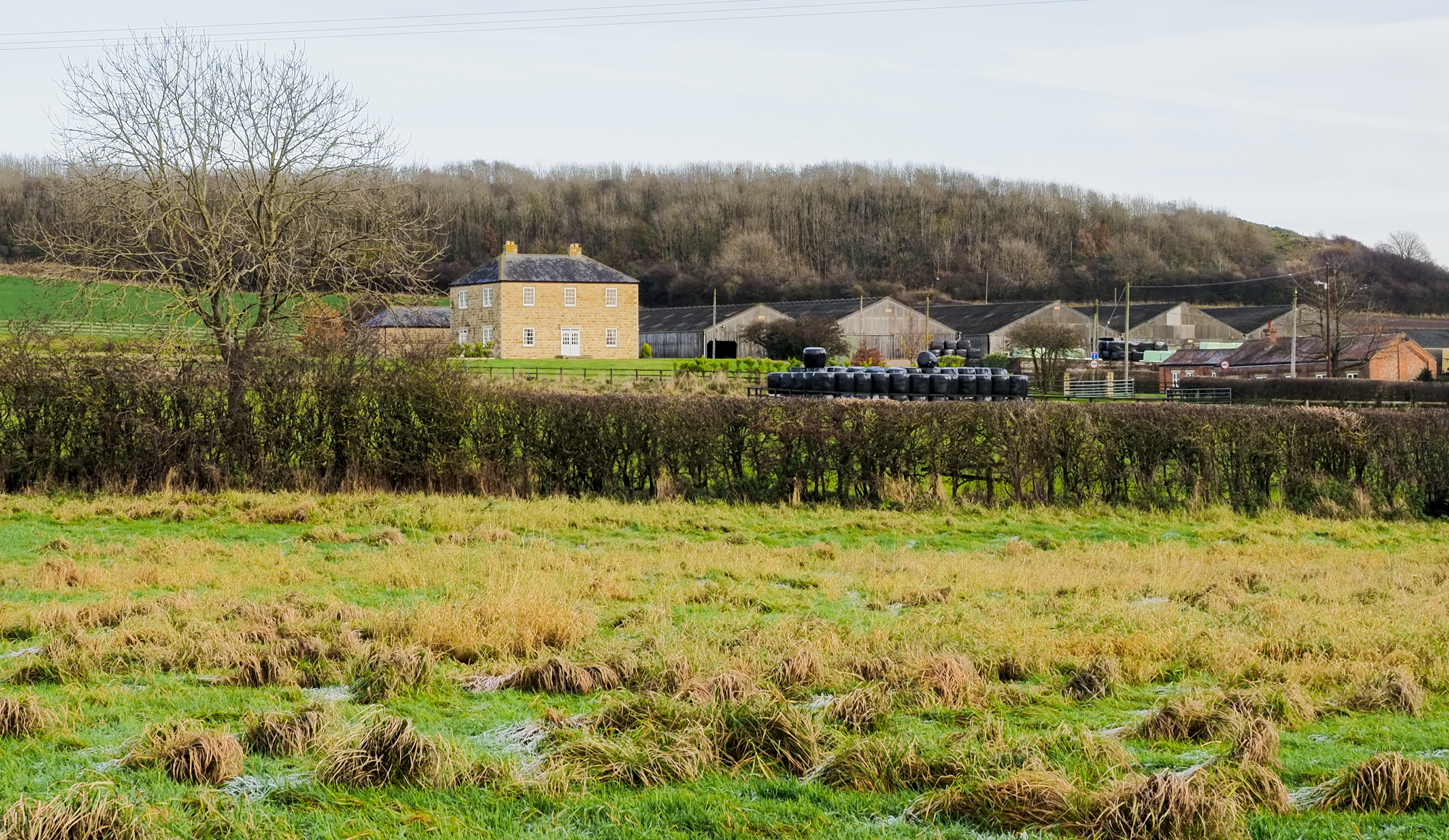
- House at Old Quarrington in 2019

- Location within County Durham
- Civil parish: Cassop-cum-Quarrington
- Unitary authority: County Durham
- Ceremonial county: Durham
- Region: North East
- Country: England
- Sovereign state: United Kingdom
- Police: Durham
- Fire: County Durham and Darlington
- Ambulance: North East

Old Quarrington is a hamlet in the civil parish of Cassop-cum-Quarrington, in County Durham, England. It is situated between Bowburn and Quarrington Hill. It is also known locally as Heugh Hall, which was the name of a local colliery.

In the Middle Ages, Old Quarrington was the centre of a district of County Durham called “Queringdonshire" (Quarringtonshire), which contained nearby Sherburn, Shadforth, Cassop, Wingate and Whitwell House.
