= High Shincliffe =

Village in County Durham, England

Coordinates: 54.7525°N 1.5358°W

- Location within County Durham
- OS grid reference: NZ297400
- Civil parish: Shincliffe
- Unitary authority: County Durham
- Ceremonial county: County Durham
- Region: North East
- Country: England
- Sovereign state: United Kingdom
- Post town: DURHAM
- Postcode district: DH1
- Dialling code: 0191
- Police: Durham
- Fire: County Durham and Darlington
- Ambulance: North East
- UK Parliament: City of Durham

High Shincliffe is a village in County Durham, England. It is situated about two miles south-east of Durham City, on the A177 road to Stockton-on-Tees. The altitude of High Shincliffe is approximately 90 metres (300 ft), and it lies 55 metres (180 ft) above the River Wear at Shincliffe bridge. Latest population figures are available from the 2011 Census.

High Shincliffe, formerly known as Shincliffe Colliery, is still often thought of as being part of Shincliffe, although the terms Shincliffe Village and High Shincliffe are also often used to distinguish the two. The place name sign on the A177 northbound through High Shincliffe reads 'Shincliffe'.

Ecclesiastically, High Shincliffe is within the Church of England parish of Shincliffe, in the diocese of Durham. There is no church in High Shincliffe, although there was once a chapel, remembered in the name given to the location of two houses built on the site: Chapel Place. The parish church of St. Mary is located in Shincliffe Village, where there is also a graveyard in which burials still take place.

High Shincliffe is part of the civil parish of Shincliffe which is unwarded and elects a parish council. High Shincliffe is part of the Durham South electoral division of Durham County Council. High Shincliffe is in the Durham City parliamentary constituency represented by the Labour Party's Mary Foy.

== Facilities ==
High Shincliffe can be characterised as a dormitory suburb of Durham City. There is a small, well-regarded, primary school, a recreational park with a playing field with equipment for young children, a public house, a public telephone box and several bus stops. There used to be a sub Post Office at Bank Top which also served as a small general store - since 2019 it has been Betty Bee's coffee shop. The nearest shops and Post Office are in Bowburn, about a mile to the south. The nearest public lending library is also in Bowburn, although the Clayport Library in Durham has a wider range of books and facilities.

A fibre-to-the-cabinet link to Durham telephone exchange was installed by BT in 2011, so broadband quality is now reasonably good. High Shincliffe is not served by cable television. Digital television by aerial is available from the transmitter at Pontop Pike, but the quality of reception can be patchy. There is adequate, though not excellent, mobile phone reception in High Shincliffe.

There are no public recycling facilities in High Shincliffe, although there is a fortnightly kerbside collection of material for recycling. More extensive recycling facilities are located at Coxhoe.

== Transport ==
High Shincliffe is within a mile of the A1(M) from London to Edinburgh, although its nearest junction is two miles away at Bowburn.

The A177 from Durham to Bowburn, via High Shincliffe, has been partly laid out as a cycle route. High Shincliffe is served by several bus routes, some to local villages, and others ranging more regionally. The buses are popular, but car ownership in High Shincliffe is high, not least because most supermarket shopping is located at out-of-town sites with no direct bus links (Sainsbury's and Lidl at the Arnison Centre; Tesco and Aldi in Gilesgate Moor and Dragonville).

The nearest railway station is about three miles away in Durham, on the East Coast Main Line between London and Edinburgh. The next major station to the north is Newcastle (16 minutes), and to the south is Darlington (20 minutes).

Two airports, approximately equidistant, are within reach of High Shincliffe. To the north is Newcastle Airport (the major of the two airports) and to the south, near Darlington, is Teesside International Airport.

View of Durham Cathedral from High Shincliffe

== History ==
During the nineteenth century High Shincliffe was known as Shincliffe Colliery, as shown on the Ordnance Survey map of 1856–1865. Most of the pre-twentieth century houses in High Shincliffe date from this period. William Bell & Co. commenced the sinking of the coal mine on 11 September 1837, and the first coal was raised to the surface on 8 November 1839. By 1840 the colliery was in full production, mining a seam of coal (the Hutton seam) 6 feet (1.8 m) thick at a depth of 400 feet (120 m), which was 100 feet (30 m) below sea level. By the mid-1860s, ownership had passed through a series of partnerships to Joseph Love & Partners, who also owned Houghall Colliery, and from 1867, the two mines were worked together.

In total, 18 people were killed at the mine, the youngest being a girl aged nine years who strayed onto the waggonway and was crushed by some waggons.

Dates of closure are given variously as 1875 and 1887, and from then the population declined substantially; this can be seen on the Ordnance Survey sheet of 1894–1899. The maps of 1919–1926, 1938–1950 and 1951–1959 show only a handful of rows of houses remaining. By the time of the 1960–1969 Ordnance Survey map there were even fewer houses, and the name Shincliffe Colliery was finally lost. The only cartographical indication that these dwellings were separate from Shincliffe (Village) is the retention of the name 'Bank Top' for the houses that clustered around the Post Office at the top of Shincliffe Bank.

Subsequently, policy changes by the County Council led to a major housing development and primary school, and the introduction of the name 'High Shincliffe'.

Most evidence of the nineteenth century colliery has long vanished but some houses of the period remain, such as in Quality Street, Pond Street and The Avenue. The school is built on site of the pit head, and the centre circle of the school's football pitch marks the spot where the coal mine shaft was sunk. The line of the colliery waggon-way can still be traced northwards past Manor Farm and on to Shincliffe Lane. To the south-east a waggon-way was extended to join what was once the main railway line from London to Edinburgh, now locally called the Leamside Line, at Shincliffe Station.

== Natural history ==
Much of High Shincliffe has generous amounts of open space and footpaths and a tranquil atmosphere. Consequently there is considerable wildlife and many types of bird. Mice and shrews are common, as are bats during the warmer months. Foxes and badgers are in the fields around the estate.

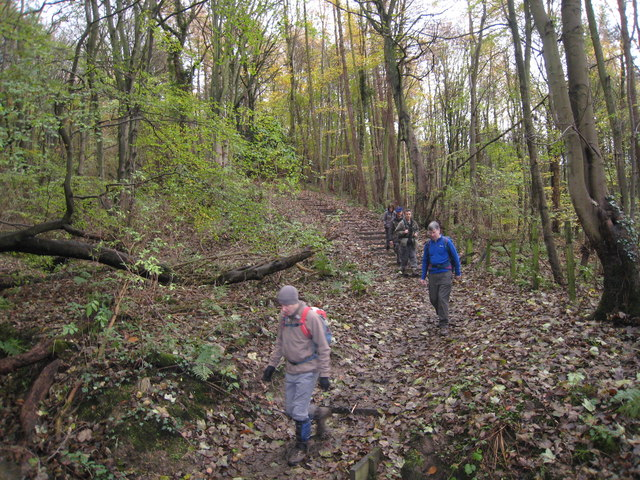
Image of walking route in the parish

High Shincliffe is surrounded by farmland supporting a mixture of crops and livestock, and several brakes largely deciduous woodland. There are no rivers but Whitwell Beck rises in High Shincliffe. Many footpaths and bridleways cross the fields, which often have boundaries of hawthorn hedges. The hedgerows include trees such as oak, ash and rowan, and bushes such as bramble, briar, elder and blackthorn.

== Geology ==
High Shincliffe lies on Carboniferous Coal Measures, from which coal was mined for several decades during the nineteenth century. As elsewhere on the Durham Coalfield, the principal seam mined was the Hutton Seam, as this was generally of sufficient thickness to make mining economically viable. Several other thinner seams were also mined. The strata dip southwards, and so the Hutton Seam lies at some depth. Moreover, several metres of boulder clay glacial drift is overlying, and is of sufficient depth to prevent any outcropping.

Two sand pits can be found towards Shincliffe Village, and whilst of no economic value now, would have had some significance in times past. It can be speculated that these pockets of sand resulted from small rivers outflowing from retreating glaciers at the end of the last ice age about 10,000 years ago.

Visible from High Shincliffe, from the south west around to the east, are escarpments of Permian magnesian limestone (dolomite), which is intensively quarried for roadstone throughout the region.

Shincliffe Bank is probably the south easterly bank of a deep flood plain following the course of a swollen, immediately post-glacial River Wear.

Of note, too, is a spring in the bank on the same side of the road several hundred metres towards High Shincliffe.

== Other ==
Shincliffe Bank was sufficiently lengthy that a water trough was provided for the refreshment of draught horses and this can still be seen on the southbound side of the A177 close to the Seven Stars public house at the High Shincliffe end of Shincliffe Village.

== People ==
Having only a relatively short history, High Shincliffe boasts few well-known residents, past or present.

- Tony Blair lived in Hill Meadows during his school years at the Chorister School in Durham.
