= Garmondsway =

Hamlet in County Durham, England

Coordinates: 54.706°N 1.469°W

- Location within County Durham
- OS grid reference: NZ342347
- Unitary authority: County Durham
- Ceremonial county: County Durham
- Region: North East
- Country: England
- Sovereign state: United Kingdom
- Post town: DARLINGTON
- Postcode district: DL17
- Police: Durham
- Fire: County Durham and Darlington
- Ambulance: North East

Garmondsway is a small dispersed hamlet in the parish of Kelloe in County Durham, England situated between Durham and Sedgefield.

It is notable as including substantial remains of an abandoned village including an extant ridge and furrow field system and became a scheduled monument in 1957.

It was formerly part of the extra-parochial chapelry of Garmondsway Moor due to its ownership by Sherburn Hospital. Garmondsway Moor was also a civil parish between 1866 and 1937.

King Canute (1017–1035) reportedly walked five miles barefoot from Garmondsway to Durham Cathedral on pilgrimage, and gave the church a large estate around Staindrop and Gainford.

== Etymology ==
The name Garmondsway is of Old English origin. It is derived from the personal-name Garmund + weg ("a road").
