= Cassop-cum-Quarrington =

Civil parish in County Durham, England

Coordinates: 54.74078°N 1.49346°W

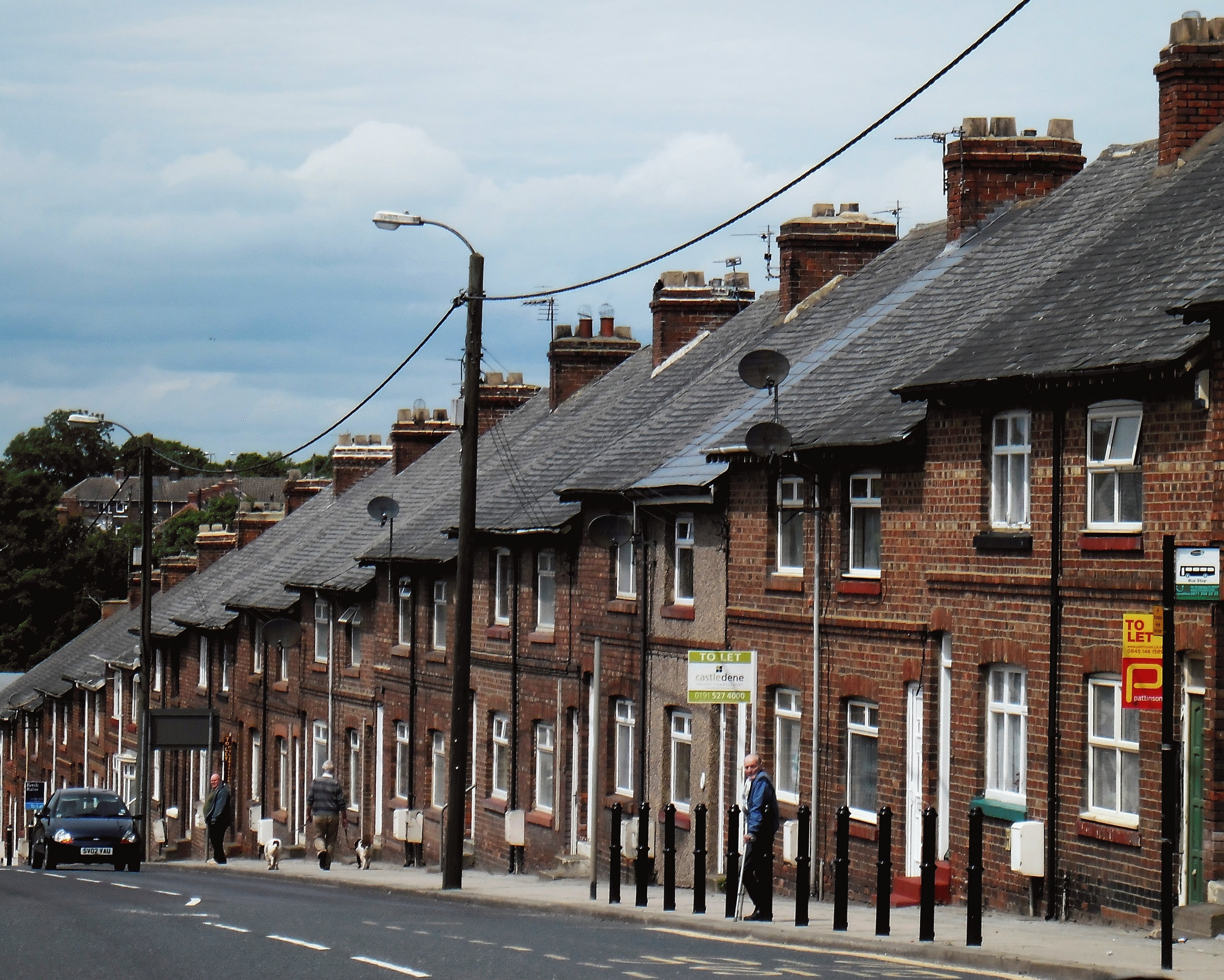
- Bowburn in 2013

- Location within County Durham
- Population: 5,219 (2011 census)
- Civil parish: Cassop-cum-Quarrington
- Unitary authority: County Durham
- Ceremonial county: Durham
- Region: North East
- Country: England
- Sovereign state: United Kingdom
- Police: Durham
- Fire: County Durham and Darlington
- Ambulance: North East

Cassop-cum-Quarrington is a civil parish in County Durham, England. According to the 2001 census it had a population of 4,735, increasing to 5,219 at the 2011 census.

The parish covers a number of settlements:

- Bowburn
- Cassop
- Old Cassop
- Old Quarrington
- Parkhill
- Tursdale

Unlike the ecclesiastical parish of Cassop-cum-Quarrington with Bowburn, the civil parish does not include Quarrington Hill.

The civil parish was created in 1887 from the townships of Cassop and Quarrington with boundary changes in 1946 and 1953 (the latter changes moved much of the newly built Bowburn Estate into the parish from Whitwell House). Following a residential development at the north-west corner of Bowburn, falling within the Shincliffe parish boundaries, a small adjustment to boundaries was made in 2014 to bring the development wholly within Cassop-cum-Quarrington.

The parish was divided into two wards from the May 2013 elections. The division between the two is marked by the A1(M) motorway.

- West Ward, consisting of Bowburn and Tursdale, has 11 councillors
- East Ward, consisting of Cassop, Parkhill, Old Cassop and Old Quarrington, has 4 councillors.

As of 2019 the majority of councillors are members of the Labour Party.

== History of Parkhill ==
Park Hill was originally a farm, most of which disappeared under the A1(M) motorway interchange in the 1960s. Many of the original homes on the current Parkhill housing estate were built for miners. Because it is separated from Bowburn by the motorway, Parkhill is often mistaken for part of Coxhoe but in recent times Durham County Council set the record straight by erecting signs that clearly show that Parkhill is a distinct community.

The Clarence Villa Hotel, and the houses opposite the hotel (Clarence Villas) are both close to what was the Four Mile Bridge, which still defines the border between Parkhill and Coxhoe. On the far side of what was the bridge ran the Clarence Railway, established in 1828. The railway was named after the Duke of Clarence, who became King William IV in 1830. It was a link to the collieries in the area to ports at Stockton and Hartlepool. At the beginning the railway only linked Port Clarence, on Teesside, with neighbouring Stockton, but it was extended north in the 1830s. The Clarence connection is remembered in Bowburn’s Clarence Street and Parkhill’s Clarence Villas.
