= Sherburn Hospital =

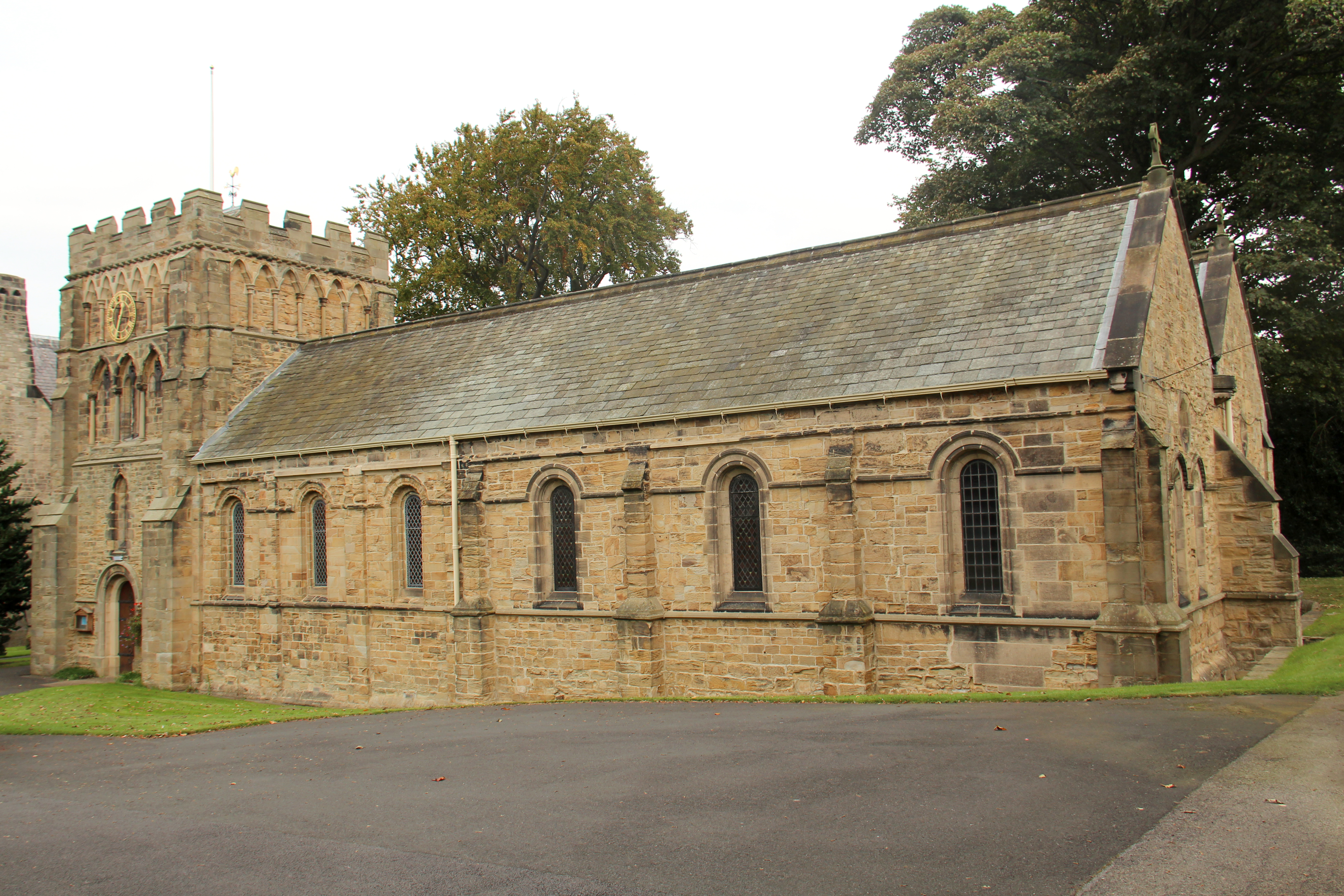
- Sherburn Hospital Chapel

- Shown in County Durham

Geography
- Location: Sherburn House, County Durham, England
- Coordinates: 54.768°N 1.523°W

Organisation
- Type: Leper hospital

History
- Founded: 1181

Sherburn Hospital (also known as Christ's Hospital in Sherburn) is a medieval hospital located in the hamlet of Sherburn House to the southeast of Durham, England.

== History ==
The hospital was founded in 1181 by Hugh de Puiset (Bishop Pudsey), to care for 65 lepers and dedicated to "our Lord, to the Blessed Virgin, to St. Lazarus and his sisters, Mary and Martha". Its statutes were amended at the request of Bishops Richard Kellaw and Thomas Langley.

The hospital was endowed with a range of lands, including Sherburn, Garmondsway Moor, Ebchester, Whitton, Raceby and Sheraton.

Sherburn Hospital survived the Dissolution of the Monasteries and the associated closures of many hospitals (including nearby Kepier) and a new constitution was introduced by Act of Parliament in 1585 for the establishment of "The Master and Brethren of Christ's Hospital in Sherborne near Durham". Ralph Lever, canon of Durham Cathedral, was master of the hospital at the time of his death.

George Stanley Faber became master of the hospital in 1832 and devoted much of his income to improving it. He died there in 1854 and was buried in its chapel.

The hospital became very wealthy due to coal mining on its estates. As a result, a new regime was introduced in 1857 by the charity commissioners meaning:

- Provision was made for the education of poor children resident in the townships of Sherburn House and Whitwell by setting money aside for the erection and maintenance of a school, and for grants to schools in Gilesgate, Shadforth and Shincliffe, attended by children of miners or labourers living on Hospital estates.
- The Master was to be a clergyman appointed by the Bishop and was to have the general supervision of the inmates and officers, subject to the overriding authority of the Governors.
- The total number of Brethren was to be thirty: fifteen living in and fifteen living out. There was no longer any reference to the casual relief of wayfarers at the gate.
- The construction of a hospital in the modern sense of the word was envisaged, the number of patients being initially limited to thirty-five, and the building was completed by 1863. For various reasons, admissions did not begin until 1872.
- A dispensary, providing free medical treatment for the poor, was opened in part of the Master's house in 1858 and later in a special building. The average annual attendance soon exceeded 3,700.

The chapel and the gatehouse are grade II* listed buildings.

== See also ==
- Anthony Salveyn, a master of the hospital in the 14th century
