= George Stanley Faber =

British Anglican theologian and author

- Born: 25 October 1773
- Died: 27 January 1854 (aged 80)
- Spouse: Eliza Sophie
- Theological work
- Language: English

George Stanley Faber (often written G. S. Faber; 25 October 1773 – 27 January 1854) was an Anglican theologian and prolific author.

He was a typologist, who believed that all the world's myths were corrupted versions of the original stories in the Bible, and an advocate of Day-Age Theory. He was a contemporary of John Nelson Darby. Faber's writings had an influence on Historicism and Dispensationalism.

== Life ==
Faber, eldest son of the Rev. Thomas Faber, vicar of Calverley, Yorkshire, by Anne, daughter of the Rev. David Traviss, was born at Calverley parsonage on 25 October 1773, and educated at Hipperholme Grammar School, near Halifax, where he remained until he went to Oxford. On 10 June 1789 he matriculated from University College, being then only in his sixteenth year; he was elected a scholar on 25 March following, and took his B.A. degree when in his twentieth year. On 3 July 1793 he was elected a fellow and tutor of Lincoln College. He proceeded M.A. 1796 and B.D. 1803, served the office of proctor in 1801, and in the same year as Bampton lecturer preached a discourse, which he published under the title of Horæ Mosaicæ.

By his marriage, 31 May 1803, with Eliza Sophia, younger daughter of Major John Scott-Waring of Ince, Cheshire, he vacated his fellowship, and for the next two years acted as his father's curate at Calverley. In 1805 he was collated by Bishop Barrington to the vicarage of Stockton-on-Tees, which he resigned three years afterwards for the rectory of Redmarshall, also in Durham, and in 1811 he was presented by the same prelate to the rectory of Longnewton, in the same county, where he remained twenty-one years. Bishop Burgess collated him to a prebendal stall in Salisbury Cathedral in 1830, and Bishop van Mildert gave him the mastership of Sherburn Hospital in 1832, when he resigned the rectory of Longnewton. At Sherburn he devoted a very considerable part of his income to the permanent improvement of the hospital estates, and at his death left the buildings and the farms in perfect condition.

His nephew Frederick William Faber converted to Catholicism and also became a well known theologian and author.

== Views and work ==
Throughout his career he strenuously advocated the evangelical doctrines of the necessity of conversion, justification by faith, and the sole authority of scripture as the rule of faith. By this conduct, as well as by his able writings, he obtained the friendship of Bishop Burgess, Bishop van Mildert, Bishop Barrington, the Marquis of Bath, Lord Bexley, and Dr. Routh.

His work on The Origin of Pagan Idolatry, 1816, considers that all the pagan nations worshipped the same gods, who were only deified men. This began at the Tower of Babel, and the triads of supreme gods among the heathens represent the three sons of Noah. He also wrote on the Arkite Egg’ and some of his views on this subject may likewise be found in his Bampton Lectures. His treatises on the Revelation and on the Seven Vials belong to the older school of prophetic interpretation, and the restoration of the French empire under Napoleon III was brought into his scheme.

His books on the primitive doctrines of election and justification retain some importance. He laid stress on the evangelical view of these doctrines in opposition to the opinion of contemporary writers of very different schools, such as Vicesimus Knox and Joseph Milner. His works show some research and careful writing. He died at Sherburn Hospital, near Durham, 27 January 1854, and was buried in the chapel of the hospital on 1 February. His wife died at Sherburn House 28 November 1851, aged 75.

== Works ==
His works include:

- 'Two Sermons before the University of Oxford, an attempt to explain by recent events five of the Seven Vials mentioned in the Revelations,’ 1799.
- 'Horæ Mosaicæ, or a View of the Mosaical Records with respect to their coincidence with Profane Antiquity and their connection with Christianity,’ 'Bampton Lectures,’ 1801.
- 'A Dissertation on the Mysteries of the Cabiri, or the Great Gods of Phœnicia, Samothrace, Egypt, Troas, Greece, Italy, and Crete,’ 2 vols. 1803.
- 'Thoughts on the Calvinistic and Arminian Controversy,’ 1803.
- 'A Dissertation on the Prophecies relative to the Great Period of 1,200 Years, the Papal and Mahomedan Apostasies, the Reign of Antichrist, and the Restoration of the Jews,’ 2 vols. 1807; 5th ed., 3 vols. 1814–18.
- 'A General and Connected View of the Prophecies relative to the Conversion of Judah and Israel, the Overthrow of the Confederacy in Palestine, and the Diffusion of Christianity,’ 2 vols. 1808.
- 'A Practical Treatise on the Ordinary Operations of the Holy Spirit,’ 1813; 3rd ed. 1823.
- 'Remarks on the Fifth Apocalyptic Vial and the Restoration of the Imperial Government of France,’ 1815.
- 'The Origin of Pagan Idolatry ascertained from Historical Testimony and Circumstantial Evidence,’ 3 vols. 1816.
- 'A Treatise on the Genius and Object of the Patriarchal, the Levitical, and the Christian Dispensations,’ 2 vols. 1823.
- 'The Difficulties of Infidelity,’ 1824.
- 'The Difficulties of Romanism,’ 1826; 3rd ed. 1853.
- 'A Treatise on the Origin of Expiatory Sacrifice,’ 1827.
- 'The Testimony of Antiquity against the Peculiarities of the Latin Church,’ 1828.
- 'The Sacred Calendar of Prophecy, or a Dissertation on the Prophecies of the Grand Period of Seven Times, and of its Second Moiety, or the latter three times and a half,’ 3 vols. 1828; 2nd ed. 1844.
- 'Letters on Catholic Emancipation,’ 1829.
- 'The Fruits of Infidelity contrasted with the Fruits of Christianity,’ 1831.
- 'The Apostolicity of Trinitarianism, the Testimony of History to the Antiquity and to the Apostolical Inculcation of the Doctrine of the Holy Trinity,’ 2 vols. 1832.
- 'The Primitive Doctrine of Election, or an Enquiry into Scriptural Election as received in the Primitive Church of Christ,’ 1836; 2nd ed. 1842.
- 'The Primitive Doctrine of Justification investigated, relatively to the Definitions of the Church of Rome and the Church of England,’ 1837.
- 'An Enquiry into the History and Theology of the Vallenses and Albigenses, as exhibiting the Perpetuity of the Sincere Church of Christ,’ 1838.
- 'Christ's Discourse at Capernaum fatal to the Doctrine of Transubstantiation on the very Principle of Exposition adopted by the Divines of the Roman Church,’ 1840.
- 'Eight Dissertations on Prophetical Passages of Holy Scripture bearing upon the promise of a Mighty Deliverer,’ 2 vols. 1845.
- 'Letters on Tractarian Secessions to Popery,’ 1846.
- 'Papal Infallibility, a Letter to a Dignitary of the Church of Rome,’ 1851.
- 'The Predicted Downfall of the Turkish Power, the Preparation for the Return of the Ten Tribes,’ 1853.
- 'The Revival of the French Emperorship, anticipated from the Necessity of Prophecy,’ 1852; 5th ed. 1859.
- 'An Inquiry into the History and Theology of the Ancient Vallenses and Albigenses,' originally 1838, reprinted 1990, Church History Research & Archives

Many of these works were answered in print, and among those who wrote against Faber's views were Thomas Arnold, Shute Barrington (bishop of Durham), Christopher Bethell (bishop of Gloucester), George Corless, James Hatley Frere, Richard Hastings Graves, Thomas Harding (vicar of Bexley), Frederic Charles Husenbeth, Samuel Lee, D.D., Samuel Roffey Maitland, D.D., N. Nisbett, Thomas Pinder Pantin, Le Pappe de Trévern, and Edward William Whitaker.

== Neologiser ==
Faber also coined the words astronomicodiluvian, fabulize, magistratual, petrean, polyonomy, preterist, regeneratory, triclavianism.

== Sources ==
This article incorporates text from a publication now in the public domain: Stephen, Leslie, ed. (1889). "Faber, George Stanley". Dictionary of National Biography. Vol. 18. London: Smith, Elder & Co.
