= Helmet of Constantine =

Lost relic of Roman Emperor Constantine the Great

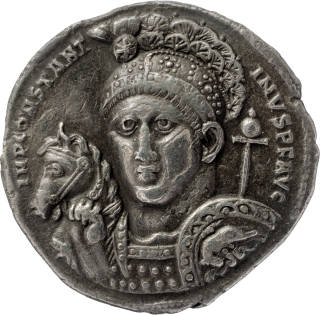
Silver medallion of 315; Constantine with a chi-rho symbol as the crest of his helmet

The Helmet of Constantine was a form of helmet worn by the Roman Emperor Constantine the Great, now lost, which featured in his imperial iconography. According to a story recorded by St. Ambrose and others, it included relics gathered in the Holy Land by his mother, Empress St. Helena. Constantine's conversion to Christianity, which happened around AD 300, was of great importance. In this period it was believed that touching the body of the deceased or even something that came in contact with the person who had died was said to have special powers. This belief started a movement to find these relics to protect churches, cities, and even people.

== History ==
At the time, Constantine I was thought to be protected due to the relic in his possession. The helmet that he wore was said to have a piece of the True Cross that Jesus was crucified on. After Constantine was made Caesar, he issued the Edict of Milan (313), sending his mother Helena to find the True Cross and to send back what she found. Helena found the cross and sent three nails that were used in the crucifixion of Jesus back to Rome and her son Constantine.

The helmet that Constantine wore included one of the Holy Nails that Saint Helena found at the crucifixion site. By making the helmet with one of the nails, it was supposed to protect him from any harm. Not only was it a sign of protection, but it was also said to fulfil the prophecy of Zechariah. The prophecy located in the fourteenth chapter of the Book of Zechariah said that one would come who engraved “Holiness to the Lord” on both the bells of the horses and headpiece of the man. At this time, the Roman emperor had the holiest relics known to man.

A rare silver medallion dated 315 AD shows Constantine with a chi-rho symbol as the crest of his helmet, and Eusebius' Life of Constantine records that he often wore such a helmet in later life, although it is not visible in other bronze coins. Constantine was very aware of this, and let the entire Roman Empire know that he was the owner of this holy helmet. The emperor had coins made with the image of him wearing his helmet on the front. On every VLLP coin that was made, Constantine was shown wearing his helmet. This was one way that Constantine moved the Roman Empire away from the pagan religion and towards Christianity. The coins that were made after Constantine acquired his helmet showed that the nail was not the only thing that made his helmet religious. Constantine also had the Christogram inscribed on the helmet. There were also a few religious symbols that were placed on the helmet. The Christogram was placed on the helmet, which usually represented the cross, but at times it was interpreted as Jesus Christ himself. Another one of these symbols was a labarum piercing a dragon, a serpent. This was significant because the serpent was represented as the Devil. But it was also the symbol for any enemy that the Roman Empire had. Constantine's helmet stood for the strength that the Roman Empire had through military force, and God. The helmet was put on the coins to let everyone know of this. Constantine's helmet was mainly a crown that was fastened to the head by two clamps. The majority of the helmet was made out of iron and gold. Constantine thought having the chi-roh symbol on the helmet would give him added protection to that of the relic that was already in the helmet. The crown that was made with the nail was placed around a full helmet when the Emperor went into battle, but could easily be taken off.

== See also ==
- Nail (relic)
