= Durham Flower Festival =

- Genre: Flower show
- Dates: End of August
- Locations: Durham, County Durham, England
- Founded: 2014
- Website: http://www.durhamflowerfestival.co.uk

The Durham Flower Festival is an annual flower and horticulture show run by, and held at, East Durham College's Houghall Campus in Durham, County Durham, England. The festival is held in August and the inaugural show was held in 2014. The show was established by the College following the decision by Gateshead Council to axe the Gateshead Flower Show.
