= Dick Witham =

English footballer

Personal information
- Full name: Richard Witham
- Date of birth: 4 May 1913
- Place of birth: Bowburn, England
- Date of death: 1999 (aged 85–86)
- Position: Defender

Senior career*
| Years | Team | Apps | (Gls) |
- Durham City
| 1933–1934 | Huddersfield Town | 4 | (0) |
| 1934–1938 | Blackpool | 149 | (0) |
| 1946 | Oldham Athletic | 5 | (0) |
- * Club domestic league appearances and goals

Richard Witham (4 May 1913 – 1999) was a professional footballer who played in the Football League for Huddersfield Town, Blackpool and Oldham Athletic. He was born in Bowburn, County Durham.
