= Holy Nail =

Christian relics believed to be the nails used in Jesus's crucifixion

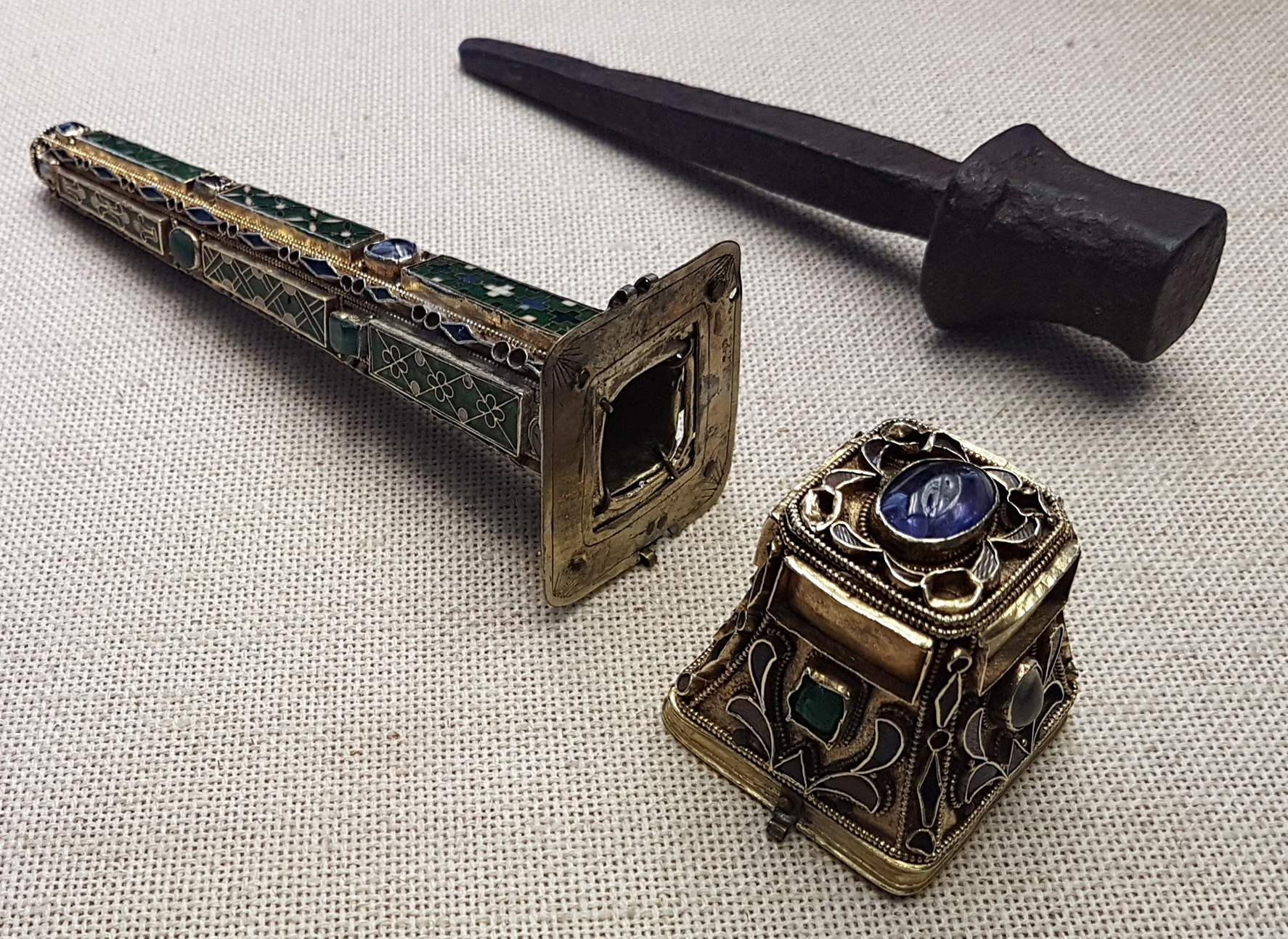
Holy Nail reliquary in the Treasury of Trier Cathedral

Relics that are claimed to be the Holy Nails with which Jesus was crucified are objects of veneration among some Christians, particularly Roman Catholics and the Eastern Orthodox. In Christian symbolism and art, they figure among the Arma Christi or Instruments of the Passion, the objects associated with the Passion of Jesus. Like the other Instruments, the Holy Nails have become an object of veneration among many Christians and have been pictured in paintings.

The authenticity of these relics is doubtful. The Catholic Encyclopedia wrote:

Very little reliance can be placed upon the authenticity of the thirty or more holy nails which are still venerated, or which have been venerated until recent times, in such treasuries as that of Santa Croce in Rome, or those of Venice, Aachen, the Escurial, Nuremberg, Prague, etc. Probably the majority began by professing to be facsimiles which had touched or contained filings from some other nail whose claim was more ancient. Without conscious fraud on the part of anyone, it is very easy for imitations in this way to come in a very brief space of time to be reputed originals.

It is not clear whether Jesus was crucified with three or with four nails, and the question has been long debated. The belief that three nails were used is called Triclavianism.

== The bridle and helmet of Constantine ==
Sozomen and Theodoret reported that when Helena, the mother of Constantine the Great, discovered the True Cross in Jerusalem in the fourth century AD, the Holy Nails were recovered as well. Helena left all but a few fragments of the cross in the Church of the Holy Sepulchre in Jerusalem, but returned with the nails to Constantinople. As Theodoret tells it in his Ecclesiastical History, chapter xvii:

The mother of the emperor, on learning the accomplishment of her desire, gave orders that a portion of the nails should be inserted in the royal helmet, in order that the head of her son might be preserved from the darts of his enemies. The other portion of the nails she ordered to be formed into the bridle of his horse, not only to ensure the safety of the emperor, but also to fulfil an ancient prophecy; for long before Zechariah, the prophet, had predicted that 'There shall be upon the bridles of the horses Holiness unto the Lord Almighty.'

The fifth-century church historian Socrates of Constantinople wrote in his Ecclesiastical History, which was finished shortly after 439, (Note: The history breaks off at 439.) that after Constantine was proclaimed Caesar and then Emperor, he ordered that all honor be paid to his mother Helena, to make up for the neglect paid her by her former husband, Constantius Chlorus. After her conversion to Christianity, Constantine sent her on a quest to find the cross and nails used to crucify Jesus. A Jew called Judas (in later retellings further called Judas Cyriacus) led her to the place where they were buried. Several miracles were claimed to prove the authenticity of these items, and Helena returned with a piece of the cross and the nails. Socrates wrote that one nail was used to make a bridle and one was used to make the Helmet of Constantine. Two relics exist that have the form of a bridle and are claimed to be the bridle of Constantine: one in the apse of the Cathedral of Milan, and the other in the cathedral treasury of Carpentras Cathedral.

The Iron Crown of Lombardy has been said to contain one of the nails; however, scientific analysis has shown that the crown contains no iron. The band that was supposed to have been formed from a nail is actually 99% silver.

== Nails venerated as those of Jesus's crucifixion ==
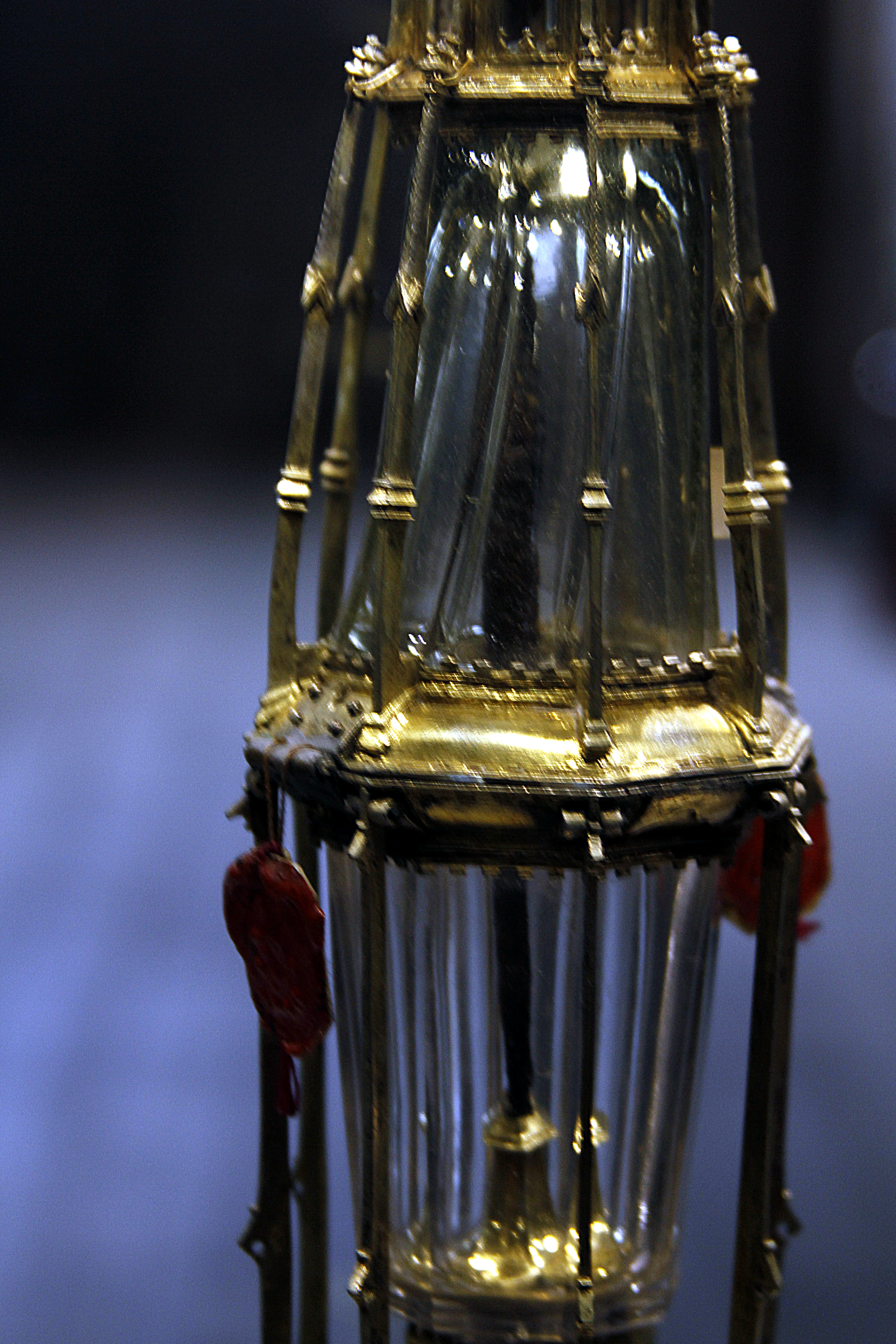
Holy Nail in Santa Maria della Scala in Siena

There are a number of extant nails venerated as those used in the crucifixion of Jesus:

- In the Basilica of Santa Croce in Gerusalemme in Rome (spike of a nail).
- In the Holy Lance of the German imperial regalia in the Hofburg Palace in Vienna.
- In the Iron Crown of Lombardy in the Cathedral of Monza.
- In the treasury of Trier Cathedral.
- In Bamberg Cathedral (middle part of a nail).
- In the form of a bridle, in the apse of the Cathedral of Milan (see Rito della Nivola).
- In the form of a bridle, in the cathedral treasury of Carpentras.
- In the monastery of San Nicolò l'Arena in Catania (head of a nail).
- In the cathedral of Colle di Val d'Elsa, near Siena.
- In the Milevsko monastery in the Czech Republic, discovered in 2020 in hidden vault.
