= Old Cassop =

Hamlet in County Durham

Coordinates: 54.74935°N 1.47723°W

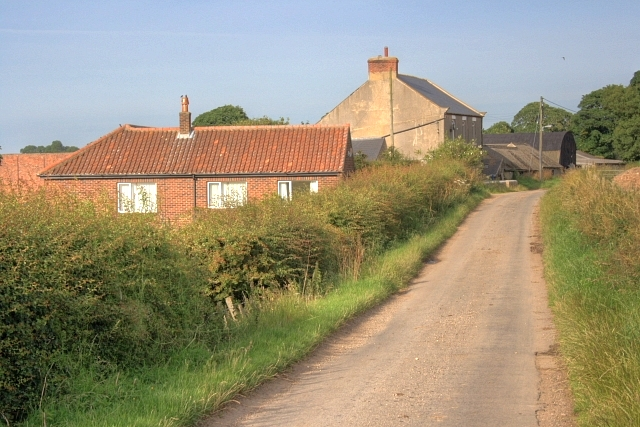
- Approaching Old Cassop

- Location within County Durham
- Civil parish: Cassop-cum-Quarrington
- Unitary authority: County Durham
- Ceremonial county: Durham
- Region: North East
- Country: England
- Sovereign state: United Kingdom
- Police: Durham
- Fire: County Durham and Darlington
- Ambulance: North East

Old Cassop is a hamlet in the civil parish of Cassop-cum-Quarrington, in County Durham, England. It is situated a few miles to the south-east of Durham.

Old Cassop is about a quarter of a mile south of the A181 road and is accessible only by an unclassified single-track road. In 1981 it became a conservation area to preserve its character, it was reviewed in 2009. The conservation area includes the fields that lie between the village and the A181.
