= Kelloe =

Village in County Durham, England

Coordinates: 54.728°N 1.461°W

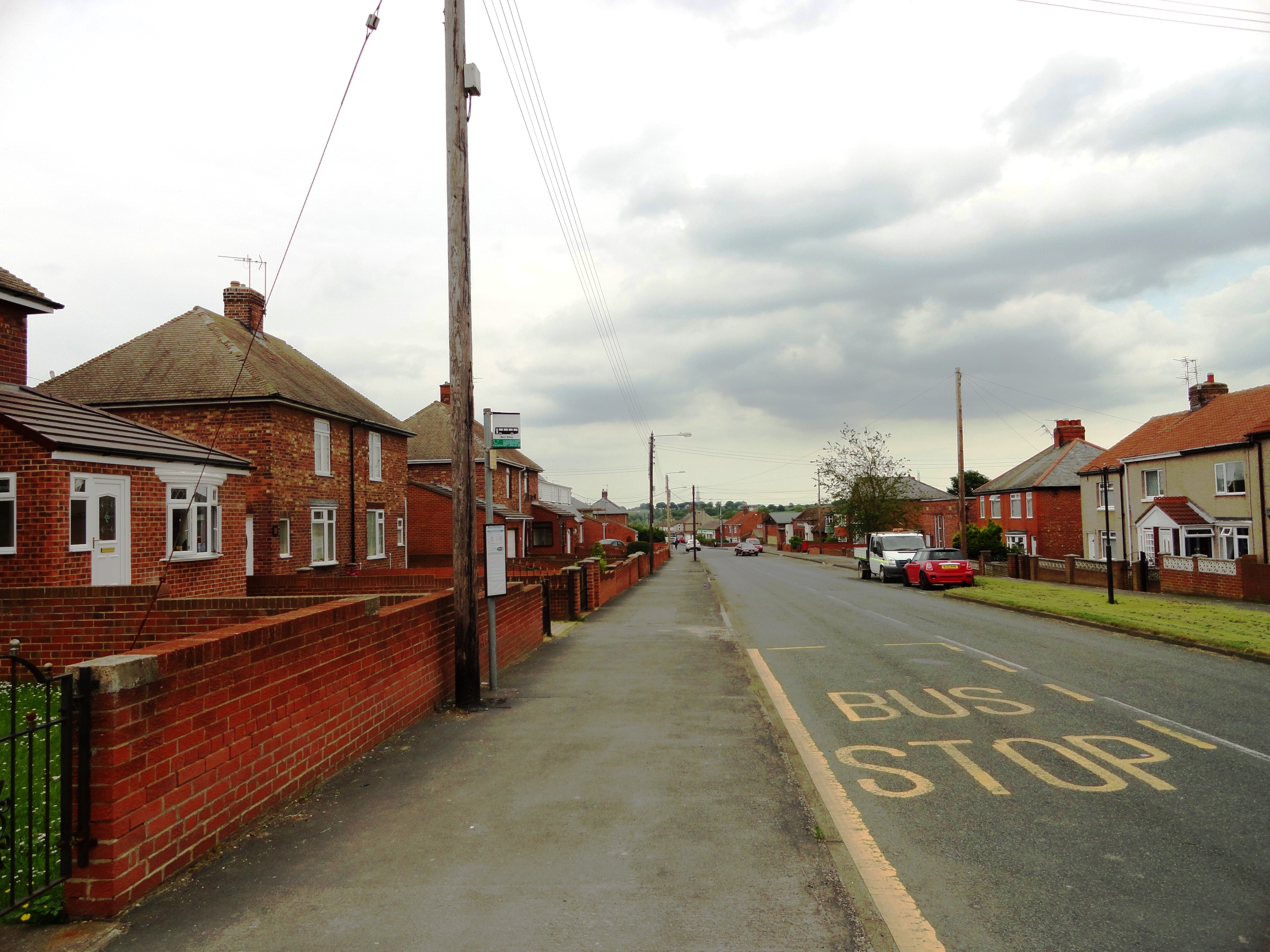
- Main street in Kelloe

- Location within County Durham
- Population: 1,502 (2011)
- OS grid reference: NZ345365
- Civil parish: Kelloe
- Unitary authority: County Durham
- Ceremonial county: Durham
- Region: North East
- Country: England
- Sovereign state: United Kingdom
- Post town: DURHAM
- Postcode district: DH6
- Dialling code: 0191
- Police: Durham
- Fire: County Durham and Darlington
- Ambulance: North East
- UK Parliament: City of Durham

Kelloe is a village and civil parish in County Durham, England. The population of the civil parish as taken at the 2011 Census was 1,502. It is situated to the south-east of Durham.

== History ==
The village takes its name from the family of Kelloe or Kellaw: Richard Kellaw was Bishop of Durham in 1311.

The Lordship of the Manor of Kelloe was bought by the Tempests of Broughton Hall, North Yorkshire, and bequeathed by Sir Henry Vane-Tempest to his daughter, Lady Frances Vane, who married the third Marquess of Londonderry. The current holder of the Lordship of Kelloe is Mr Barrington Edward Kerr Gilmour of Northumberland.

New villages were formed in the area with the expansion of the mining industry: the population of Kelloe parish—which included the townships (later to become separate parishes) of Cassop, Coxhoe, Quarrington, Thornley and Wingate—had increased from 663 to more than 11,000 by 1848. The population of Kelloe township remained low, with only 156 inhabitants. At the time, the village of Kelloe was the settlement of Town Kelloe, half a mile east of the hamlet of Church Kelloe. The modern village, west of the church, was built in the 20th century and was partly in the parish of Coxhoe until 1986; part of Quarrington Hill was transferred from Kelloe to Coxhoe at the same time.

Nearby is East Hetton or Kelloe colliery, where six men were killed by gasses from the Trimdon Grange colliery disaster in 1882.

== St Helen's Church ==
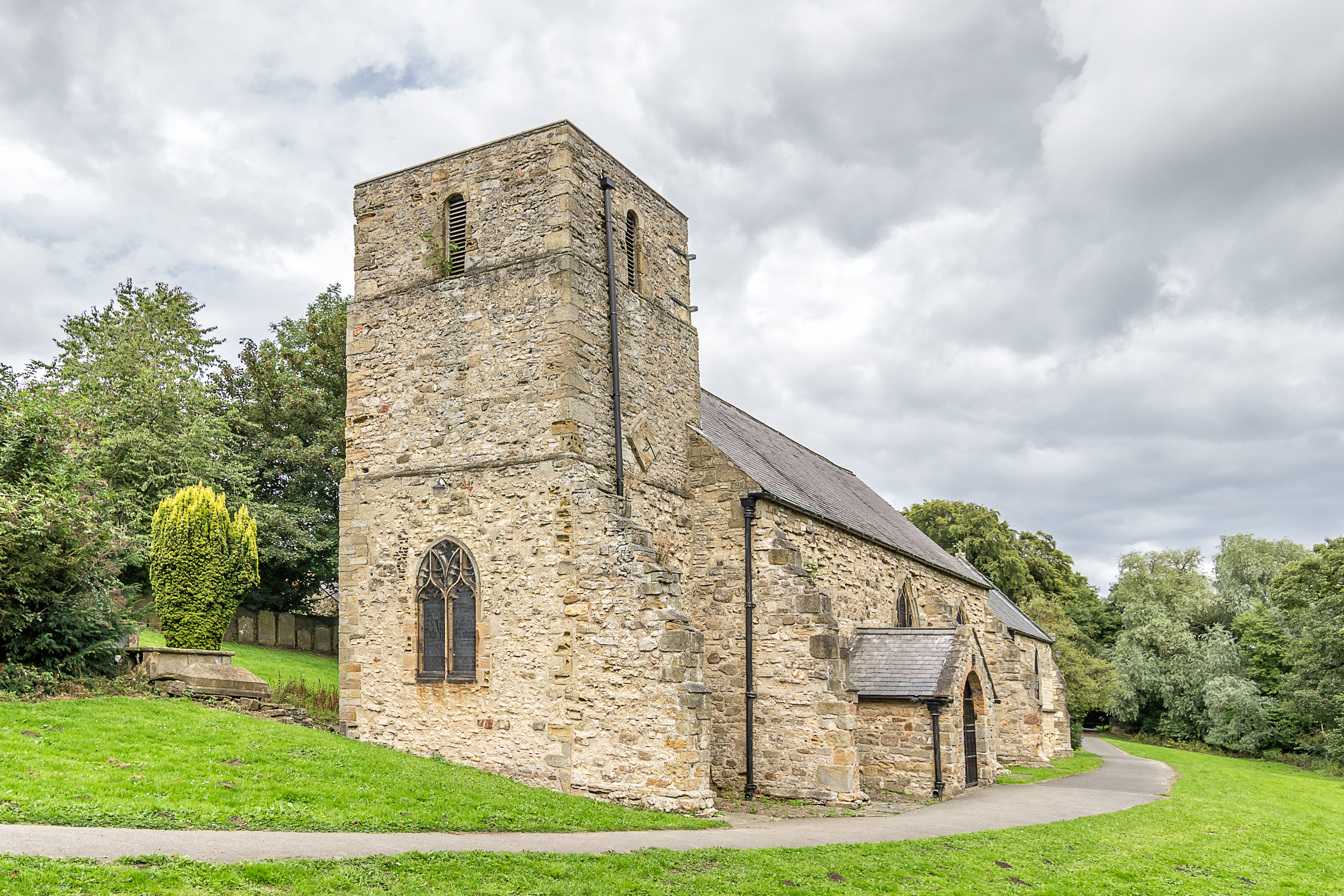
St Helen's Church, Kelloe.jpg

The parish church is in Church Kelloe, a "considerable distance" from the town of Kelloe itself. The church itself is of uncertain date. Ryder (1994) gives Saxon or Early Norman from architectural evidence. The earlier date is suggested by the herringbone and the archaic treatment of the north-west quoin indicates an early date, the herringbone work being similar to that at Seaham, which is a pre-Viking Saxon building. However if the south doorway is original then the building is post-1100. The church remained a small (unaisled) country church for most of its existence until the development of the surrounding villages with the sinking of the collieries from 1836 onwards. Mining remained a key industry in the area until the mines were closed in 1983.

=== St Helena cross ===
Ryder claims the St Helena cross as "one of the most important items of Romanesque sculpture in the country". The 12th-century cross was found broken into several pieces being used as walling stone in the south wall of the chancel. During the 1854 rebuilding it was found and reassembled. It was conserved and cleaned in the early 1990s and is currently set against the north wall of the sanctuary.

The cross shows scenes from the legend of the Invention of the True Cross, including saints Helena and Constantine, whence its name. The right face and back are plain. Three further scenes from the legend are missing, which has led to a suggestion that it is one of a pair, possibly associated with a reliquary. J T Lang in a personal communication to Ryder suggests that the reliquary might have held a portion of the True Cross and that (in the absence of documentary evidence for it having been at Kelloe) it may have been held at Durham Cathedral. The crosses and reliquary may have been moved to Kelloe in the 16th Century (since the church was already dedicated to St Helen) and it is possible that the second cross is still somewhere within the fabric of the church.

== Notable people ==
- Elizabeth Barrett Browning, English poet.
- Stan Seymour, former Newcastle United player and chairman.
