= Ralph Lever =

English Anglican priest

Ralph Lever, D.D. was an English Anglican priest in the 16th century. He died between 1580 and 1585.

Lever was educated at St John's College, Oxford, receiving his bachelor's degree in 1547-48, before receiving his doctorate from Cambridge University.

Lever is the author of the second treatise on logic written in English, The Arte of Reason, rightly termed, Witcraft. The book was written between 1549 and 1551, but was not published until 1573. He also wrote a treatise on Rithmomachia, The Most Noble auncient, and learned playe, called the Philosophers game, which was published (without his consent) in 1563.

He held livings at Washington and Stanhope. Lever was Archdeacon of Northumberland from 1566 until his resignation in 1573. At the time of his death, he was master of Sherburn Hospital.

He was appointed canon of Durham Cathedral in 1567.
