= Bowburn =

Village in County Durham, England

Coordinates: 54.74°N 01.53°W

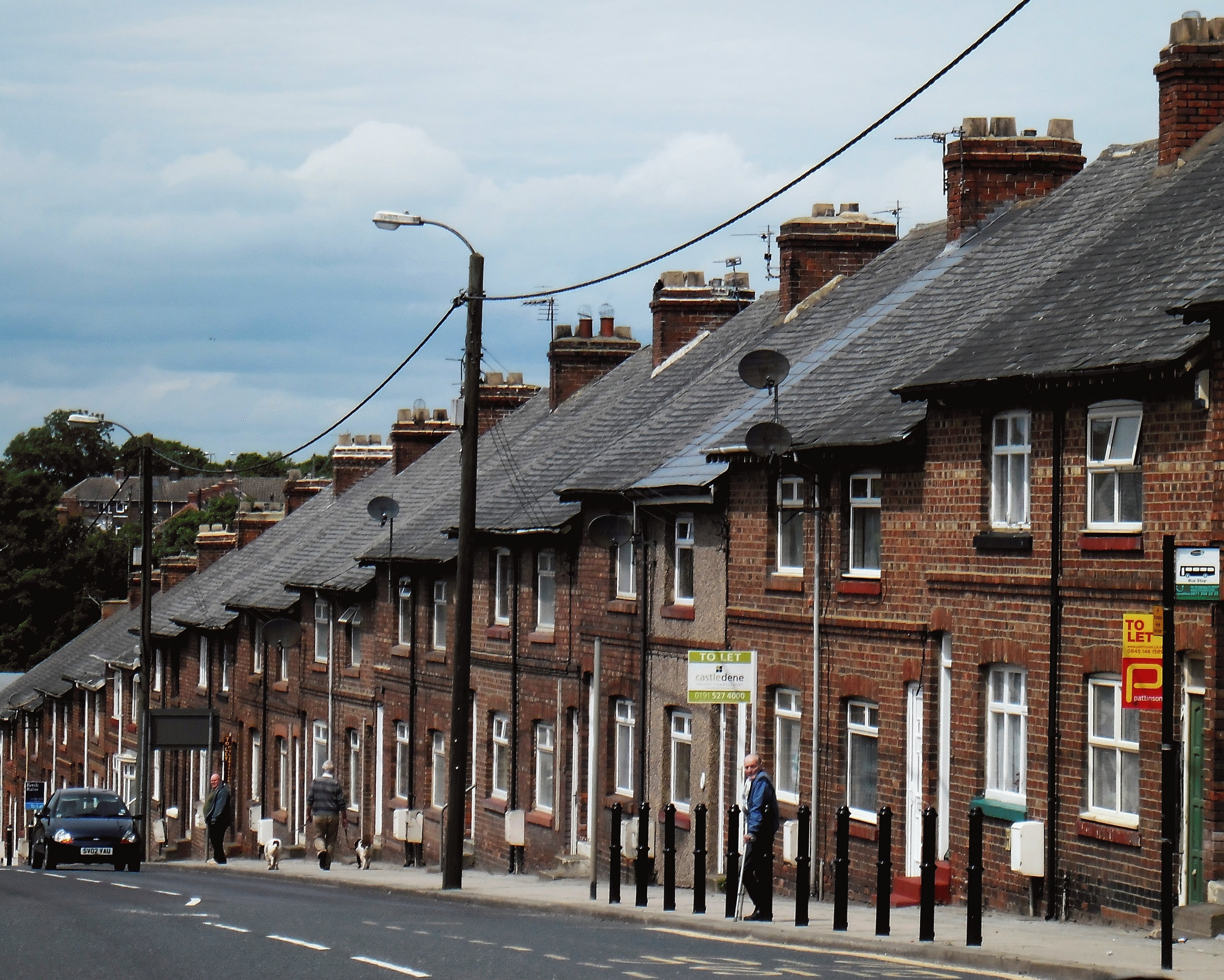
- The steep house-lined hill is the main road through Bowburn

- Location within County Durham
- Population: 5,080
- OS grid reference: NZ3038
- Civil parish: Cassop-cum-Quarrington
- Unitary authority: County Durham
- Ceremonial county: Durham
- Region: North East
- Country: England
- Sovereign state: United Kingdom
- Post town: DURHAM
- Postcode district: DH6
- Police: Durham
- Fire: County Durham and Darlington
- Ambulance: North East

Bowburn is a village in the civil parish of Cassop-cum-Quarrington, in County Durham, England. It is situated about 3 miles (4.8 km) to the south-east of Durham, on the A177, between Coxhoe to the south-east, and High Shincliffe to the north-west.

== History ==
Originally a small farming hamlet, named after the shape of the small burn that runs through it, Bowburn's history, like that of many other villages in the region, is linked closely to coal mining. Several coal mines were sunk in the area during the 19th century but extensive development did not begin until an entirely new Bowburn Colliery began to be sunk in 1906. Bowburn therefore celebrated its 100th anniversary on 23 July 2006.

The first “Bowburn Colliery” was a shaft sunk in 1840 but failed to find workable coal.

The second Bowburn Colliery was sunk a few years later, south of there (near Park Hill), being one of several sunk in the Quarrington and Coxhoe areas. It was close to the terminus of the Durham Branch of the Clarence Railway. The pit was a small concern, worked first by Robson and Jackson and then the West Hetton Coal Company. It probably closed in about 1870.

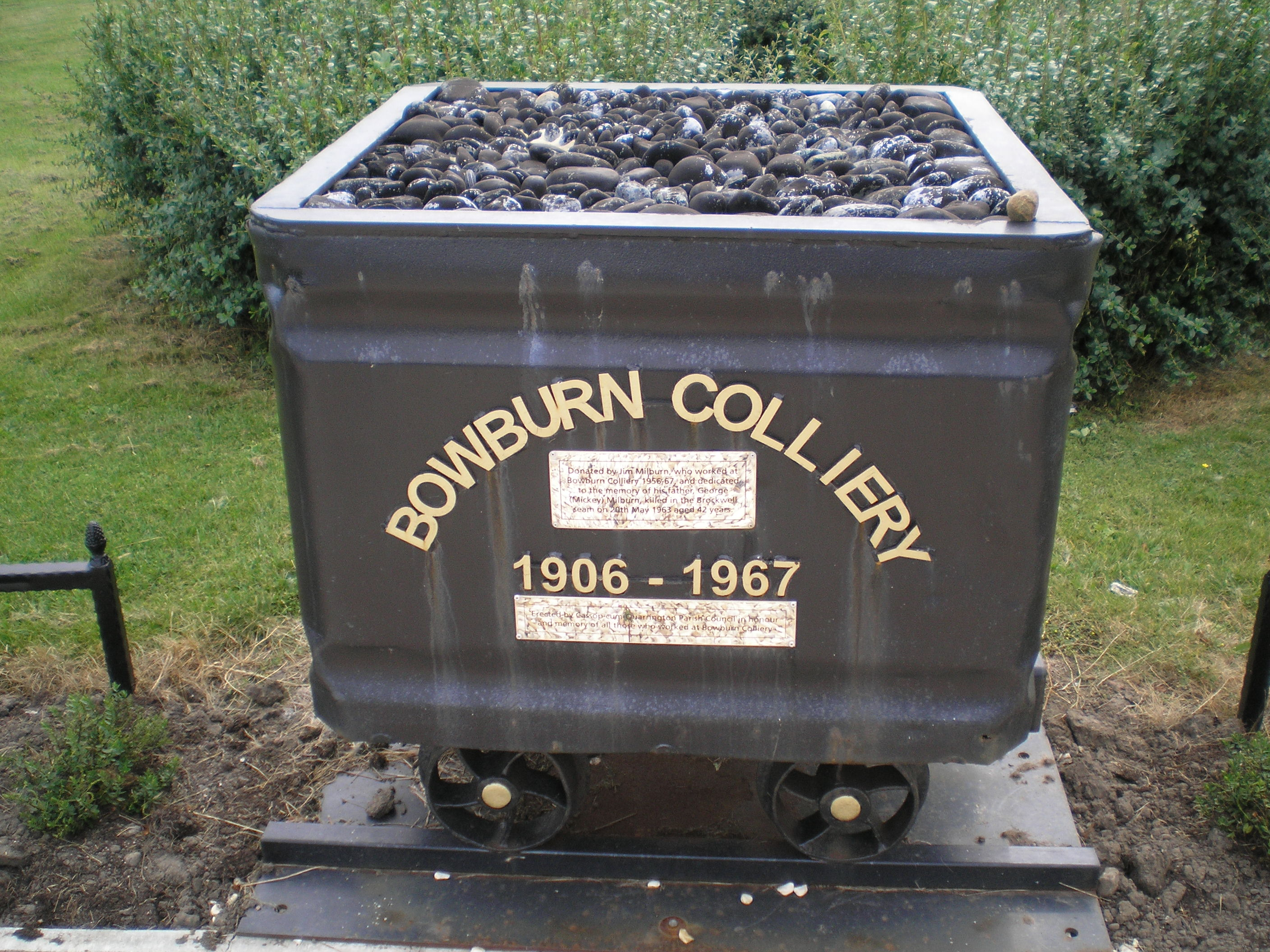
Bowburn Colliery Tub

The third and most famous Bowburn Colliery was sunk in 1906 by Bell Bros. Ltd., using the 1840 shaft as the ventilation upcast shaft (and, later, for manriding). Its first coal was drawn in 1908. It merged with Tursdale colliery in 1931 and grew to be one of the largest in the Durham coalfield, working six seams and with over 2,500 employees in the 1950s. Meanwhile, the village was growing around it. Hardly anything now remains of the colliery complex which closed in July 1967. The main colliery yard is now the site of the Bowburn South Industrial Estate.

The day of the annual Durham Miners' Gala (also called "the Big Meeting") used to see large unions of men marching through the village, as Bowburn was en route to Durham for some surrounding pit villages. Local residents have, with the help of the Heritage Lottery Fund, had two of Bowburn's original miners’ banners restored and a new one produced to be paraded at the Gala. By September 2006, two of the restored banners were on display in Bowburn Community Centre, together with the new one (the "Centenary Banner"). This, with another new one designed by Bowburn Junior School pupils, was paraded for the first time at the 2006 Gala. They have paraded through the village and at the Miners’ Gala every year since then. Other events also celebrated the village's centenary year, including a party and firework display in Bowburn Park, exactly 100 years after Gertrude Bell (as daughter of the Chairman of Bell Brothers) cut the first sod on 23 July 1906 to commence the sinking of the downcast shaft.

== Facilities ==
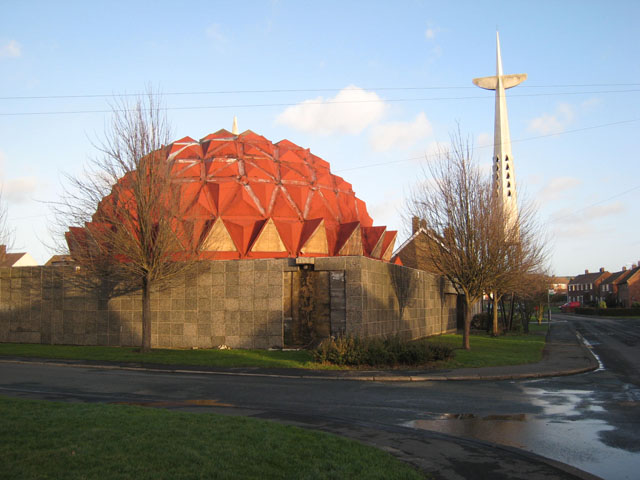
The Church of Christ the King, or "Pineapple Church", demolished in 2007 and rebuilt as a more simple building in 2008. The cross remained until Autumn 2009.

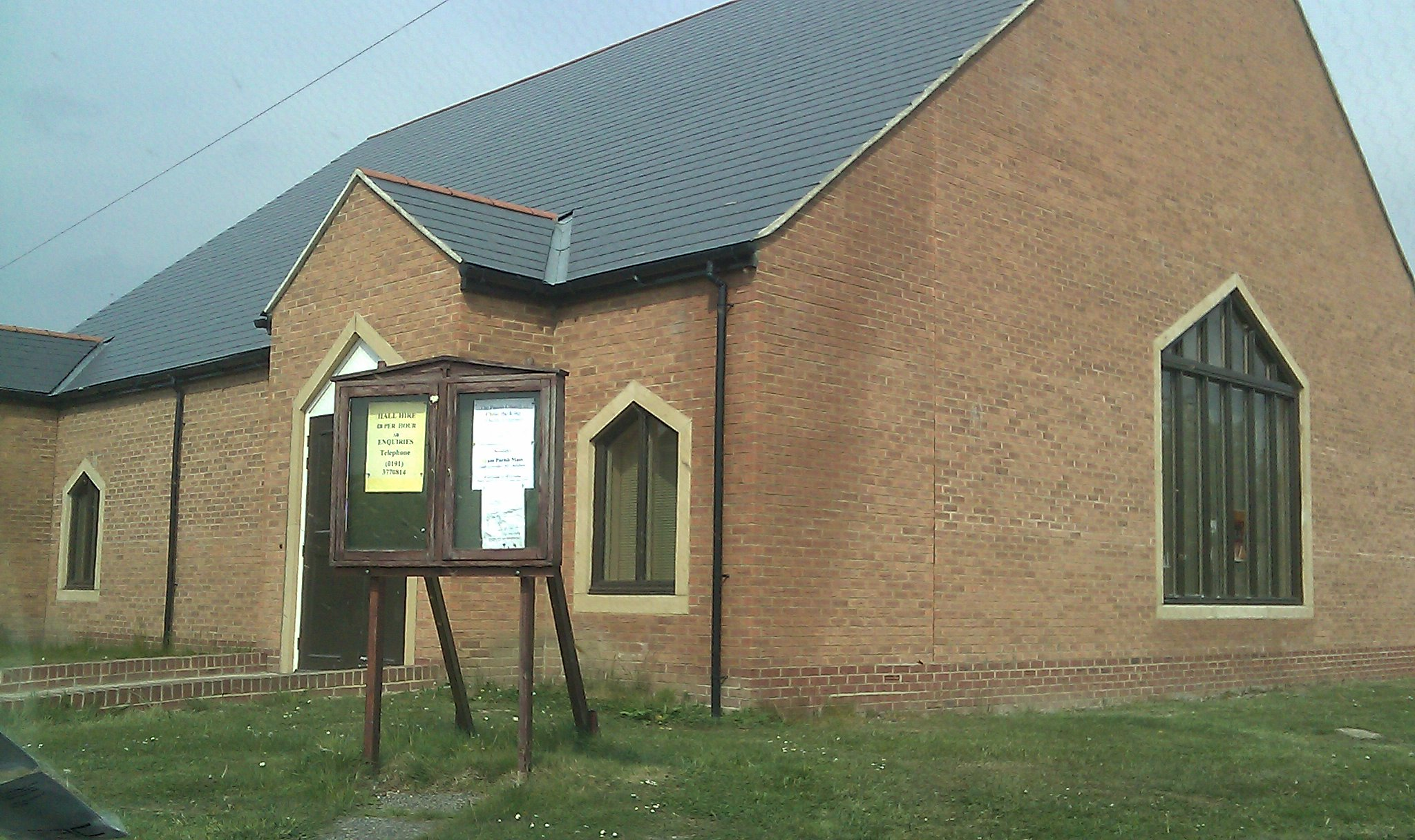
The simple, but functional, brick 'shed' which replaced the 'Pineapple Church'.

Following the closure of the colliery and latterly the Cape Minerals Works, Bowburn declined. More recently the location of the village, near Durham City and close to the A1(M) junction 61, has meant that the village has become a prime site for new commuter housing and industrial estates.

Much of the housing in Bowburn is still relatively low cost in terraces or on post-war council estates. However, there has been significant development of owner occupied housing along the eastern edge of the village, and on the old secondary school site. From 2004, a village regeneration project began, involving the demolition of some council housing on the northern estate and the building of a mixture of housing association and private housing. As part of the regeneration project, the park was upgraded, with new football fields, an outdoor gym and an excellent children's play area, as well as significant improvements to such community facilities as Bowburn Community Centre and the DJ Evans Youth Club (aka Bowburn Youth Project). A local community partnership has met monthly since the start of the regeneration project, and welcomes all residents interested in contributing to the improvement of the village and surrounding area.

A village newsletter, Bowburn Interchange, is produced by a local community group, Bowburn Village Celebration, and delivered by volunteers throughout the village four times a year.

One of Bowburn's claims to fame was its parish church, Christ the King, built between 1963 and 1978. It had a detached spire described locally as 'The Rocket' standing alongside the main church building, which featured a spiked dome roof which led some to call it "The Pineapple Church". The church ceased to be used for public worship due to its poor condition and was demolished in June 2007, while the adjacent spire fell over due to gales on 3 October 2009. In May 2008 construction of a new church building began on the site, completed in Autumn 2008.

Bowburn currently (2022) has its own primary school, formed by administratively amalgamating the infant and nursery school with the junior school in 2019. A new single-site Primary School was built adjacent to the old Junior School, and opened in April 2021. Secondary pupils attend a number of schools outside the village. Since the closure of the village's own secondary school, most pupils attended Durham Johnston Comprehensive School, in Durham City. Changes to admissions rules since then, however, mean that they attend a variety of schools. The designated school for those living north of the A1(M) motorway is now Belmont Community School.

== Notable people ==
- Dick Witham, professional footballer
