= Quarrendon (disambiguation) =

Quarrendon is a deserted medieval village in Buckinghamshire, England.

Quarrendon may also refer to:

- Quarrendon Estate, a housing estate in Aylesbury, Buckinghamshire, England
- Quarrendon School, now Aylesbury Vale Academy, Buckinghamshire, England

== See also ==
- Quarrington (disambiguation)
