= Cassop =

Village in County Durham, England

Coordinates: 54.739°N 1.465°W

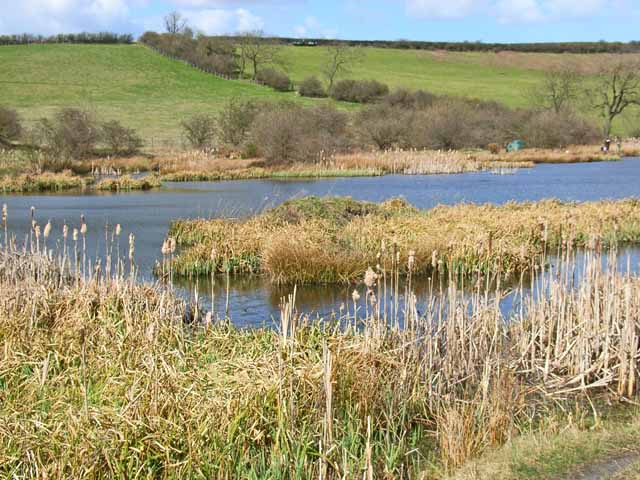
- Cassop Vale National Nature Reserve lies west of Cassop village

- Location within County Durham
- Population: 500 (est)
- OS grid reference: NZ345383
- Civil parish: Cassop-cum-Quarrington
- Unitary authority: County Durham
- Ceremonial county: Durham
- Region: North East
- Country: England
- Sovereign state: United Kingdom
- Post town: DURHAM
- Postcode district: DH6
- Police: Durham
- Fire: County Durham and Darlington
- Ambulance: North East

Cassop (formerly New Cassop) is a village and former civil parish, now in the parish of Cassop-cum-Quarrington, in the County Durham district, in the ceremonial county of Durham, England. It has a population of about 500 and is located near the city of Durham. A former mining village, mining is no longer the main occupation of Cassop's inhabitants due to extensive mine closure over the last 30 years.

Cassop Primary School is believed to have been the first in the UK to generate some of its own electricity with its own wind turbine which was erected in February 1999.

== History ==
Cassop was formerly a township and chapelry in the parish of Kelloe, from 1866 Cassop was a civil parish in its own right, on 24 March 1887 the parish was abolished and merged with Quarrington to form "Cassop cum Quarrington". In 1881 the parish had a population of 596.

== Religious sites ==
The church of St. Paul, Cassop cum Quarrington was built in 1868. The stones that were used in its construction were allegedly transported by William Smith, innkeeper of the Half Moon Inn, Quarrington Hill, as he was the only villager to own such a cart to make this possible. It was closed during the 1980s and is now demolished. Services for the parish are held at Bowburn. The churchyard is still used for burials.
