= Triclavianism =

Heretical Christian belief about the number of nails used to crucify Jesus Christ

Triclavianism is the belief that three nails were used to crucify Jesus Christ. The exact number of the Holy Nails has been a matter of speculation for centuries. Three nails are sometimes depicted as a symbolic reference to the Holy Trinity. In the early Church, two nails were posited by Ambrose (omitting any in the feet), notably in Ambrose's De obitu Theodosii. Nonnus of Panopolis, in his paraphrase of the Gospel of John, has the crowd cry for Jesus to be crucified upon "four spikes" (19:15) but eventually hung with only three, "a single nail [...] hammered into both his feet" (19:18).

== Etymology ==
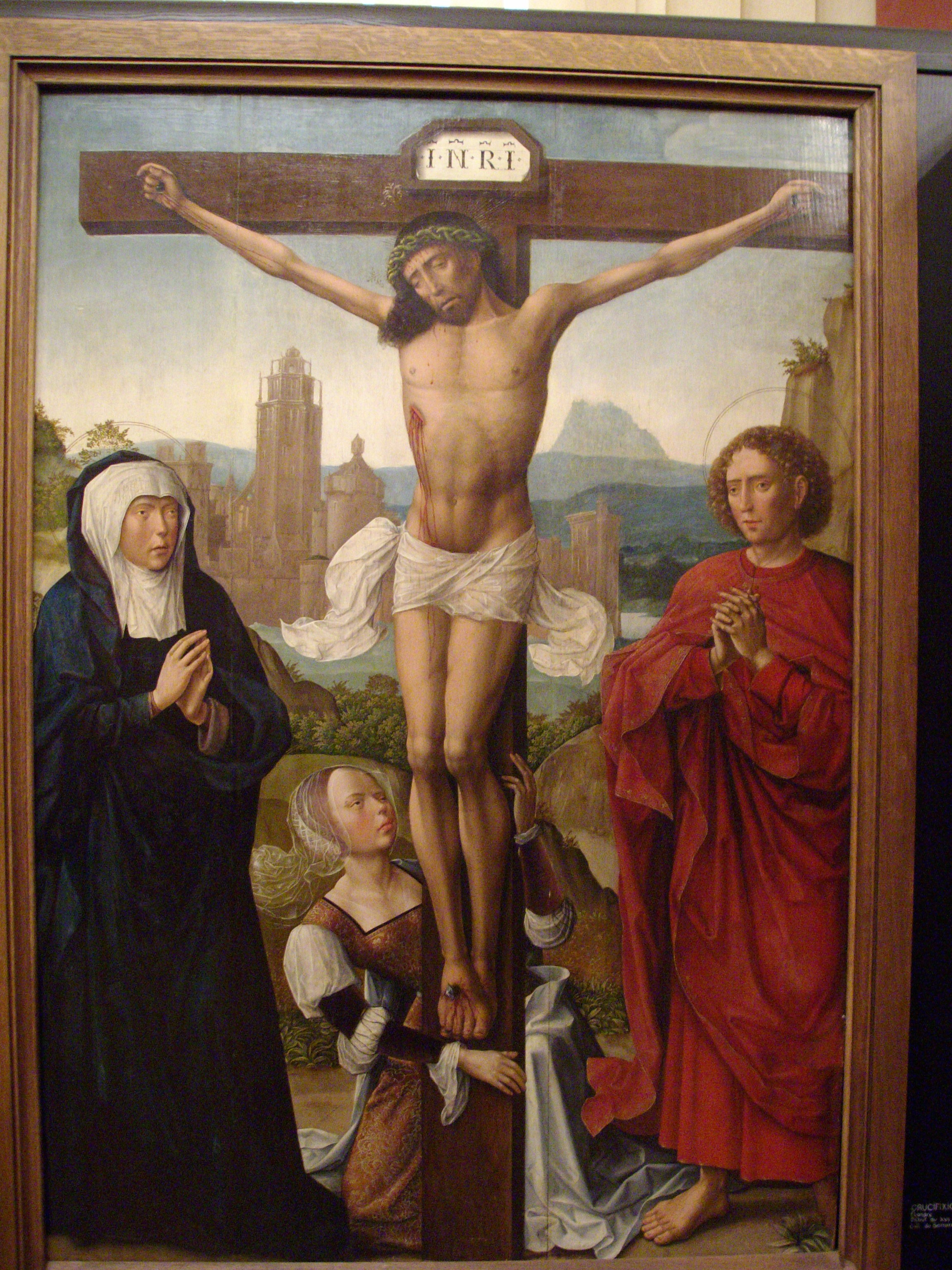
Triclavian depiction of the crucifixion of Jesus

The words triclavian and Triclavianism were coined by Anglican scholar George Stanley Faber, in his work An Inquiry into the History and Theology of the Ancient Vallenses and Albigenses (1838). Faber employs the words in the process of claiming that Pope Innocent III had implicitly, but "infallibly," endorsed the four-nail theory in 1209 through his endorsement of Francis of Assisi (1181–1226) – because in the last two years of his life Francis bore stigmata on his hands and feet which depicted four nailheads (not three). Faber calls Innocent's foundation of the Franciscan Order "a decision, which of course stamped the brand of heresy upon Triclavianism." Faber also refers to Francis as an "impostor," suggesting that his argument here is not meant as any serious attempt to settle a question of Catholic theology. Further, there is no evidence Pope Innocent III made the number of nails a matter of orthodoxy/heresy. Nevertheless, Faber's claim was picked up and repeated in other works, such as Sofia Bompiani's A Short History of the Italian Waldenses (1899), in which Bompiani simply writes that Innocent had "condemned" triclavianism. Other scholarly treatments of the subject, such as Herbert Thurston's article in the 1914 Catholic Encyclopedia, make no mention of Innocent III nor Francis.

George Stanley Faber's 1838 account is as follows (emphasis in the original):

Lucas of Tuy, in the thirteenth century, is very large on this subject. He tells us, that the world had turned to many false opinions: and he specially enumerates, the alleged Docetism of the Albigenses which denied that Christ had truly suffered in the flesh, and the unsound tenet unauthoritatively advanced by other sectaries that three nails only were used in the crucifixion and that the left side (not the right side) of our Lord was pierced by the spear.

This last opinion was advocated from about the latter end of the eleventh century: but Pope Innocent III finally and infallibly determined, that four nails were used, and that the roman [sic] soldier pierced the right side of Christ; a decision, which of course stamped the brand of heresy upon Triclavianism.

The judgment of the Pope was confirmed by a miracle: and, as a decisive proof that four nails were used and that the right side was pierced, Lucas of Tuy brings forward the remarkable case of Francis of Assisi, upon whose body were preternaturally impressed the five wounds of our Savior, in such a manner, that the semblance of the heads of four nails appeared in the inside of the two hands and on the outside of the two feet, while there was so real a wound on the right side that it often emitted blood.

Now this impostor [sic] was the founder of one of the two Orders which were started by Innocent III against the Humiliated and the Poor Men of Lyons: and as a part of the project, he contrived, we see, to mark himself in such a manner, as to bear a sort of practical testimony against the old triclavian heresy of those whom he was appointed specially to oppose. All parties acknowledged five wounds: but the semblance of four rusty nail-heads on the hands and feet of Francis were, of course, proof positive, that four of the wounds were inflicted by four nails and not by three.

== Representation in art ==
Though in the Middle Ages the crucifixion of Christ typically depicted four nails, beginning in the 13th century some Western art began to represent Christ on the cross with his feet placed one over the other and pierced with single nail. The poem Christus patiens attributed to Gregory of Nazianzus and the writings of Nonnus and Socrates of Constantinople also speak of three nails.

The three nails, as a symbol for the crucifixion of Jesus Christ, are also used on the coats of arms of Drahovce, Slovakia, Saint Saviour, Jersey, St. Clement Parish, Ottawa and in the seal of the Society of Jesus.

== Elsewhere ==
According to Faber, Triclavianism was one of the beliefs of the Albigenses and Waldensians, who held that three nails were used to crucify Christ and that a Roman soldier pierced him with a spear on the left side.

The plant Passiflora edulis (passionfruit) was given the name by early European explorers because the flower's complex structure and pattern reminded them of symbols associated with the passion of Christ. It was said that the flower contained the lashes received by Christ, the crown of thorns, the column, the five wounds and the three nails.

In the alternate history timeline of the wargame Trench Crusade, Triclavianism is stated to be the reason for the split of the Christian Church and the 90-year war that followed it.

== See also ==
- Holy Nail
