= Tursdale =

Hamlet in County Durham, England

Coordinates: 54°43′0″N 1°31′48″W

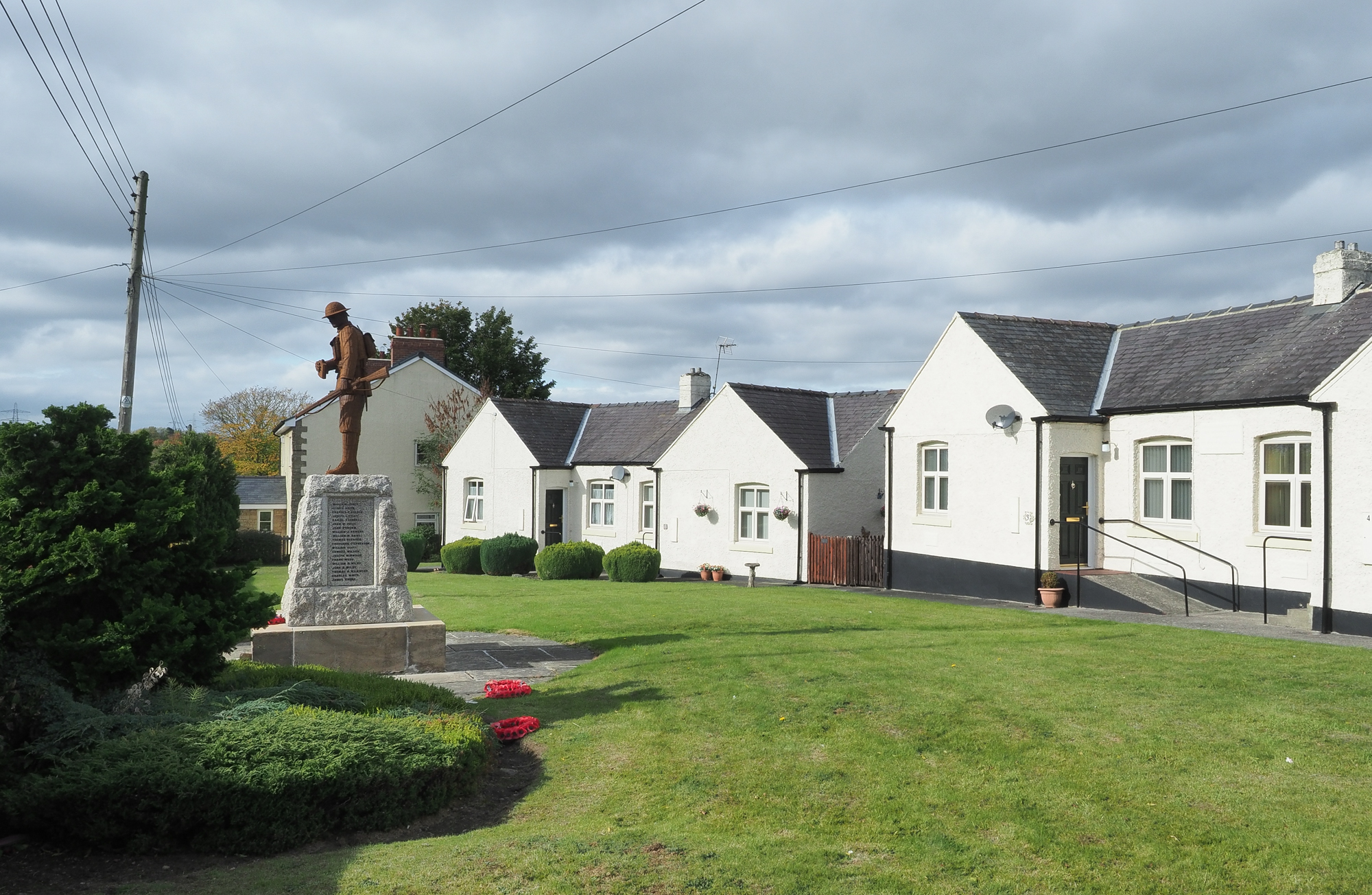
- War memorial at Tursdale Colliery

- Location within County Durham
- Civil parish: Cassop-cum-Quarrington
- Unitary authority: County Durham
- Ceremonial county: Durham
- Region: North East
- Country: England
- Sovereign state: United Kingdom
- Police: Durham
- Fire: County Durham and Darlington
- Ambulance: North East

Tursdale is a hamlet in the civil parish of Cassop-cum-Quarrington, in County Durham, England. It is situated in rural landscape about two miles to the west of Coxhoe, two miles North of Cornforth and around five miles south of Durham. It is ideally located for speedy access to both Durham city, the A1M, and Teesside via Sedgefield. Despite its close proximity to many local amenities and towns, residents enjoy the peaceful lifestyle of living in a semi-rural location, with lovely views across the fields.

Tursdale currently consists of a single street of housing, Ramsay Street, a school house and a small 4 home conversion of the former school which closed in the 1960s. A second street, School Street, a row of bungalows and other dwellings were demolished in the 1960s and early ’70s. Standalone Farm, whose final remnants probably went at about the same time, may once have been a moated house of some antiquity.

All houses in Tursdale, other than farms, were originally built to accommodate the miners who worked at the former Tursdale Colliery across the road, which was sunk in 1854. Before that, the more ancient settlement of Tursdale had been around Tursdale House and Hett Mill, to the north east. The colliery was merged with Bowburn Colliery in 1931. When that closed, in 1967, the NCB Tursdale Workshops continued to provide a regional, and then a national, resource for the NCB. They closed in 1994, and the site was converted to general business use.

Behind this small business park lie the railway lines. Tursdale has been proposed as a suitable site for a road-rail freight interchange due to its proximity to both the East Coast Main Line, the mothballed Leamside Line and the A1(M) motorway.
