= Sherburn House =

Hamlet in County Durham, England

Coordinates: 54°46.0′N 1°31.4′W

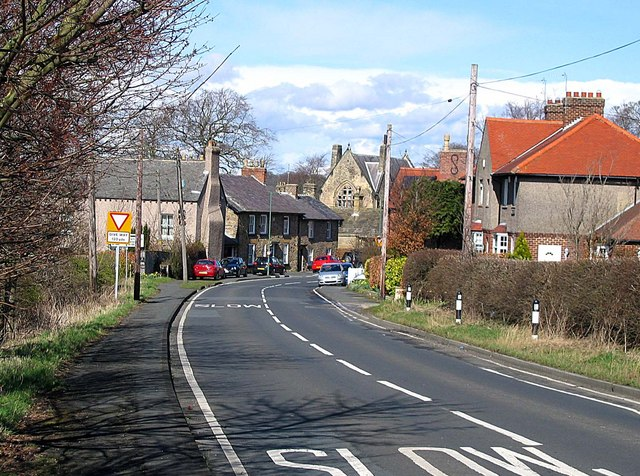

- Location within County Durham
- Civil parish: Shincliffe
- Unitary authority: County Durham
- Ceremonial county: Durham
- Region: North East
- Country: England
- Sovereign state: United Kingdom
- Police: Durham
- Fire: County Durham and Darlington
- Ambulance: North East

Sherburn House is a hamlet in the civil parish of Shincliffe, in County Durham, England. It is situated approximately 2 miles (3 km) south-east of Durham between Sherburn and Shincliffe Village.

Sherburn House is the location of Sherburn Hospital.

== History ==
Sherburn House was formerly an extra-parochial area, in 1858 Sherburn House became a separate civil parish, on 1 April 1986 the parish was abolished and merged with Sherburn and Shincliffe. In 1971 the parish had a population of 192.
