= Houghall =

Hamlet in County Durham, England

Coordinates: 54°45.5′N 1°33.8′W

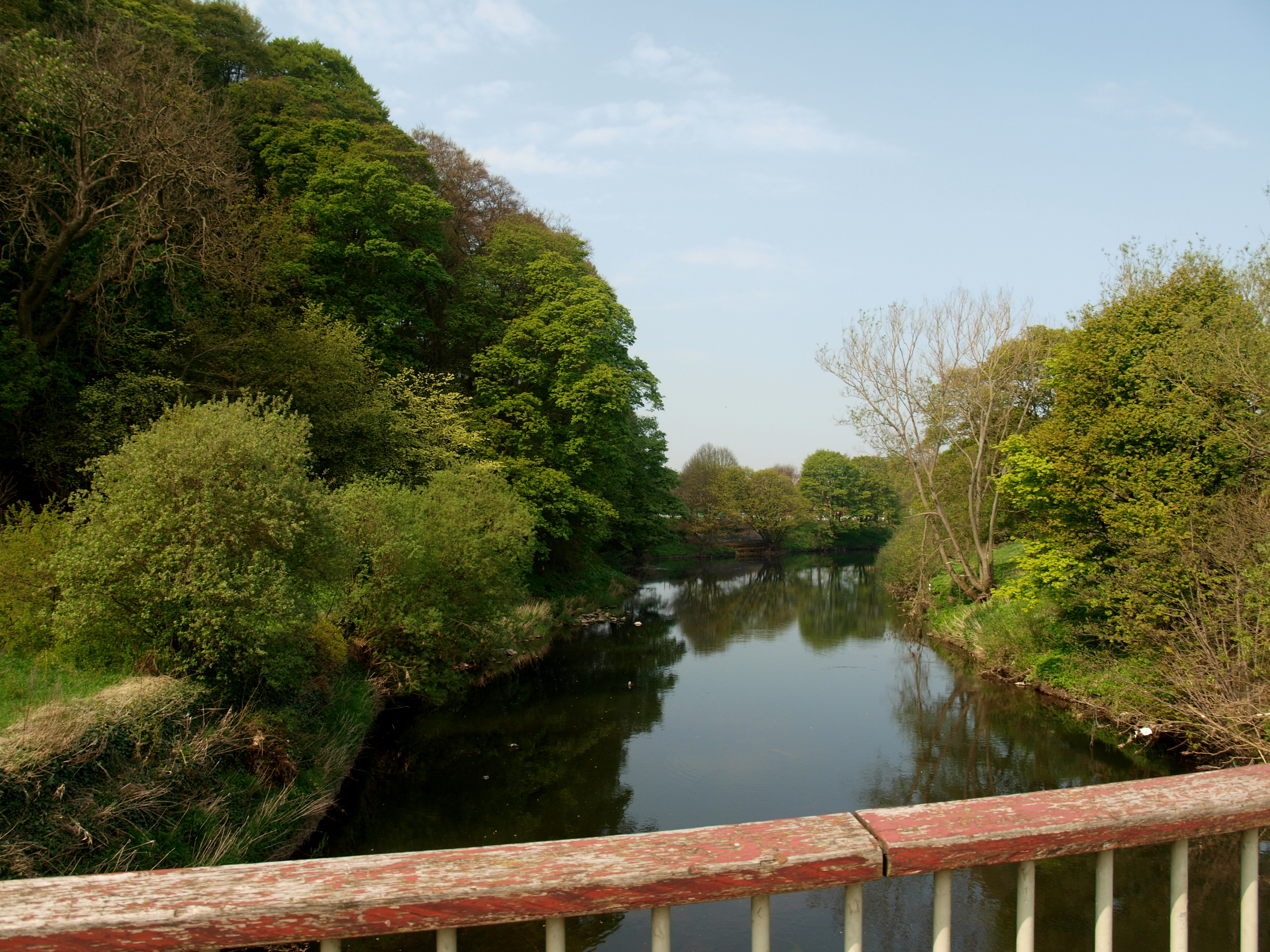
Houghall Bridge

Houghall (/hɒfl/) is a hamlet in County Durham, in England. It is situated approximately 1.5 miles (2.4 km) to the south of Durham city centre. It is also the location of the Houghall Campus of East Durham College, associated gardens, a small number of houses and a restaurant.

Coal was mined from the Hutton seam in Houghall from 1840 and a colliery village built during the 1860s although many miners lived in nearby Shincliffe. Mining declined from the 1880s and the village was demolished in the 1950s, the area landscaped and turned over to picturesque woodland. The foundations of some mining houses still remain.

In 1996 a late Bronze Age sword of the Ewart Park type was found at Houghall during preparation work for the construction of a barn.

In 2009, heavy rain at the Houghall site caused the River Wear to carve a massive trench through the grounds of the college, some 14 feet deep and 80 feet wide. This is thought to have been an old watercourse, created by monks to divert the river from Durham Cathedral. This has attracted much attention and so has been dubbed Durham's Grand Canyon.

Houghall began hosting Durham Flower Festival on its campus in 2014.
