= Shincliffe =

Village in County Durham, England

Coordinates: 54°45.6′N 1°33.0′W

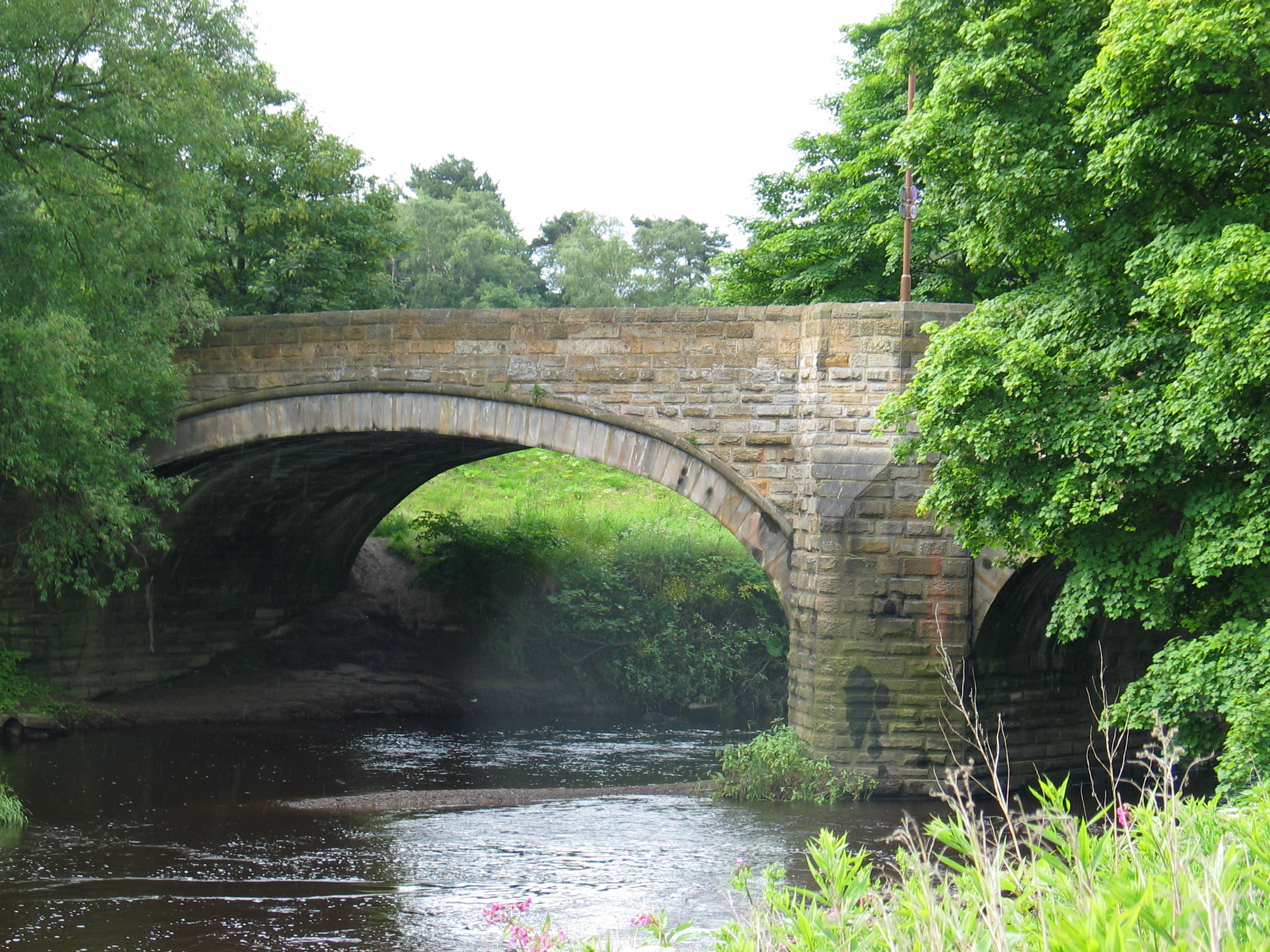
- Shincliffe Bridge over the River Wear

- Location within County Durham
- Civil parish: Shincliffe
- Unitary authority: County Durham
- Ceremonial county: County Durham
- Region: North East
- Country: England
- Sovereign state: United Kingdom
- Post town: DURHAM
- Postcode district: DH1
- Dialling code: 0191
- Police: Durham
- Fire: County Durham and Darlington
- Ambulance: North East
- UK Parliament: City of Durham

Shincliffe is a village and civil parish in County Durham, England. The parish population (according to the 2011 census) was 1,796. It is situated just over 1 mile (1.6 km) to the south-east of Durham city centre, on the A177 road to Stockton. Shincliffe is also a civil and ecclesiastical parish consisting of Shincliffe Village, High Shincliffe, Sherburn House and Whitwell House.

Shincliffe is regarded as one of the most affluent villages in Durham City and has been designated a conservation area to preserve its historic character.

== History ==
The place-name 'Shincliffe' is first attested in the Liber Vitae Ecclesiae Dunelmensis of circa 1085, where it appears as Scinneclif. It appears in the Charter Rolls of 1195 as Sineclive. The name means 'the cliff of the spectre or demon, haunted cliff'.

Shincliffe is the site of a mediaeval bridge over the River Wear and archaeological investigations in 2005 suggest Shincliffe may have been the site of a Roman crossing.

In the Middle Ages Shincliffe was an agricultural community belonging to the Prior of Durham Cathedral. The population grew significantly due to coal mining at nearby Houghall, Old Durham and Shincliffe Colliery (now High Shincliffe) but declined following mine closures in the late 19th century.

Durham's first railway station opened at Shincliffe in 1839 as the passenger terminus between the Durham area and Sunderland but closed in 1893 once a line had been run from Sherburn House to Durham itself. A goods line continued to Houghall and Croxdale Colliery. In the 1920s, Back Lane along the eastern side of the village was enlarged to become a bypass for it.

Horse racing under National Hunt rules took place at Shincliffe between 1895 and 1914. The course was taken over for military purposes during the First World War and racing never resumed.

== Local features ==
Shincliffe Hall is a nearby woodland mansion. It served as a Land Army hostel then as postgraduate hall of residence for Durham University. In 2005 it was sold into private hands.

== Religion ==
Shincliffe was an outlying part of the large Durham parish of St. Oswald's. A rectory was built in the village in 1800, and a Chapel of Ease in 1826. Shincliffe became a parish in its own right in 1831, however the Parish Church, St. Mary's, was not built until 1851. John Wesley preached in Shincliffe in 1780. A (Wesleyan) Methodist Chapel opened in Shincliffe in 1874. William Sever, Bishop of Durham (1502–1505) was born in Shincliffe.

== Businesses ==
Although Shincliffe is primarily a residential settlement, it is also home to two pubs, a daycare nursery and the Poplar Tree garden centre. The former Post Office is now a private home.
