= Whitwell House =

Coordinates: 54.764°N 1.525°W

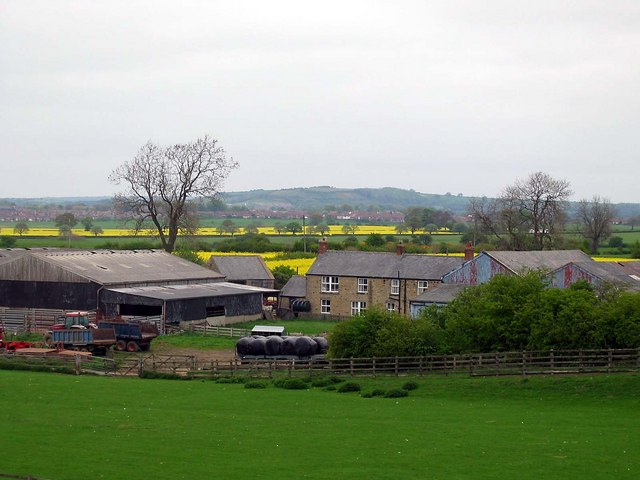
- Whitwell House Farm

- Location within County Durham
- OS grid reference: NZ306411
- Civil parish: Shincliffe
- Unitary authority: County Durham
- Ceremonial county: Durham
- Region: North East
- Country: England
- Sovereign state: United Kingdom
- Police: Durham
- Fire: County Durham and Darlington
- Ambulance: North East

Whitwell House is a place in the civil parish of Shincliffe, in County Durham, England situated a few miles to the south-east of Durham. It now consists of the hamlet of Whitwell Grange, but was from 1836 was the site of the village of Whitwell Colliery. The village declined following the closure of the colliery in 1875 and was described as 'almost deserted' by 1894. The chapelry was closely associated with the nearby Sherburn Hospital.

== Governance ==
Whitwell House was formerly an extra-parochial tract, in 1858 Whitwell House became a separate civil parish, on 1 April 1986 the parish was abolished and merged with Shincliffe. In 1971 the parish had a population of 18.
