= Quarrington Hill =

Village in County Durham, England

Coordinates: 54°43′53″N 1°28′42″W

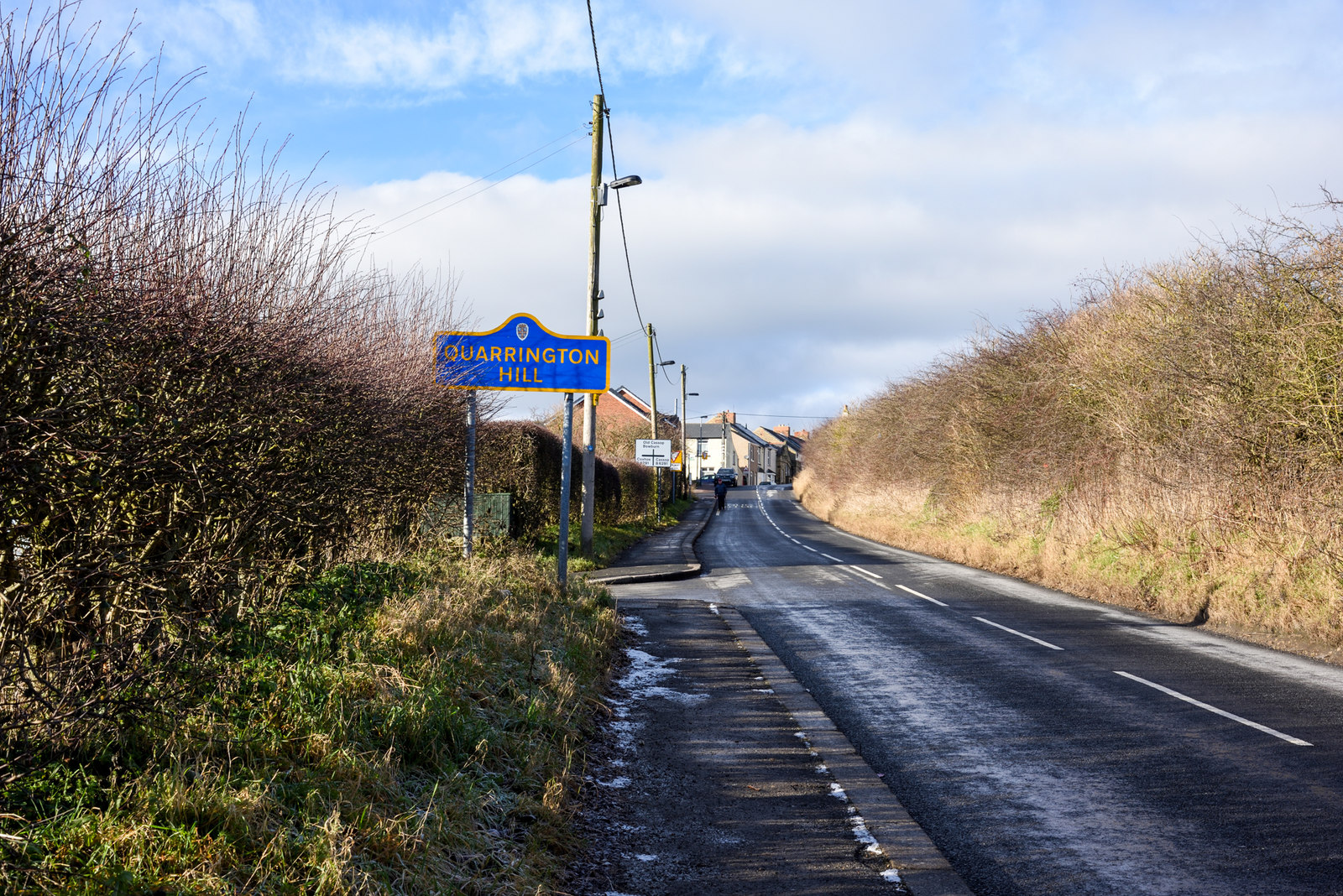
Entering Quarrington Hill

Quarrington Hill is a village in County Durham, in England. It is situated a short distance to the north of Kelloe.

Having been part of the extensive parish of Kelloe, it merged with the village of Cassop during the 19th century to form the parish of Cassop-cum-Quarrington, it is now in the parish of Coxhoe. As in most of County Durham, the chief trade here was coal mining and Cassop Colliery was where the miners worked.

The inhabitants of Quarrington Hill also shared the church of St. Pauls (built in 1868), with Cassop. The stones that were used in its construction were allegedly transported by William Smith, Innkeeper of the Half Moon Inn, Quarrington Hill, as he was the only villager to own such a cart to make this possible. It was closed during the 1980s and is now demolished. The churchyard is still used for burials.
