= Coxhoe =

Village in County Durham, England

Coordinates: 54.714°N 1.503°W

- Location within County Durham
- Population: 7,020 (2011 census)
- OS grid reference: NZ320356
- Unitary authority: County Durham
- Ceremonial county: County Durham
- Region: North East
- Country: England
- Sovereign state: United Kingdom
- Post town: DURHAM
- Postcode district: DH6
- Dialling code: 0191
- Police: Durham
- Fire: County Durham and Darlington
- Ambulance: North East
- UK Parliament: City of Durham

Coxhoe is a village in County Durham, England. It is situated about 5 miles (8 km) south of Durham City centre. The civil parish also includes nearby Quarrington Hill. The electoral ward of Coxhoe stretches beyond the boundaries of the parish and has a total population of 7,027.

== History ==
The earliest artifact to have been found in the area is a simple Bronze Age axe. There are few other remains from before the medieval period. The area only really developed in the medieval period. Another now deserted, village also grew up at Coxhoe East House, but this was probably deserted by the early 15th century.

The modern village of Coxhoe developed during the 18th and 19th centuries, spurred by coal mining, first recorded in 1750. Coxhoe Colliery was sunk in 1827; from 1801 to 1841 the population rose from 117 to 3904. Remains of other elements of the coal industry are still visible nearby. The buildings of Heugh Hall are now part of a farm, and the course of its wagon way is still visible as an earthwork.

Coxhoe had two railway stations, one at the south end of the village and one at the north. There was a pottery at Coxhoe from 1769 producing coarse brown pots, and from 1851 it also began to make clay tobacco pipes. Coxhoe also had its own gasworks, which produced gas from local coal; it was then sent around the village by a system of pipes. Most other coal was transported out of Coxhoe by the Clarence Railway.

=== Coxhoe Hall ===
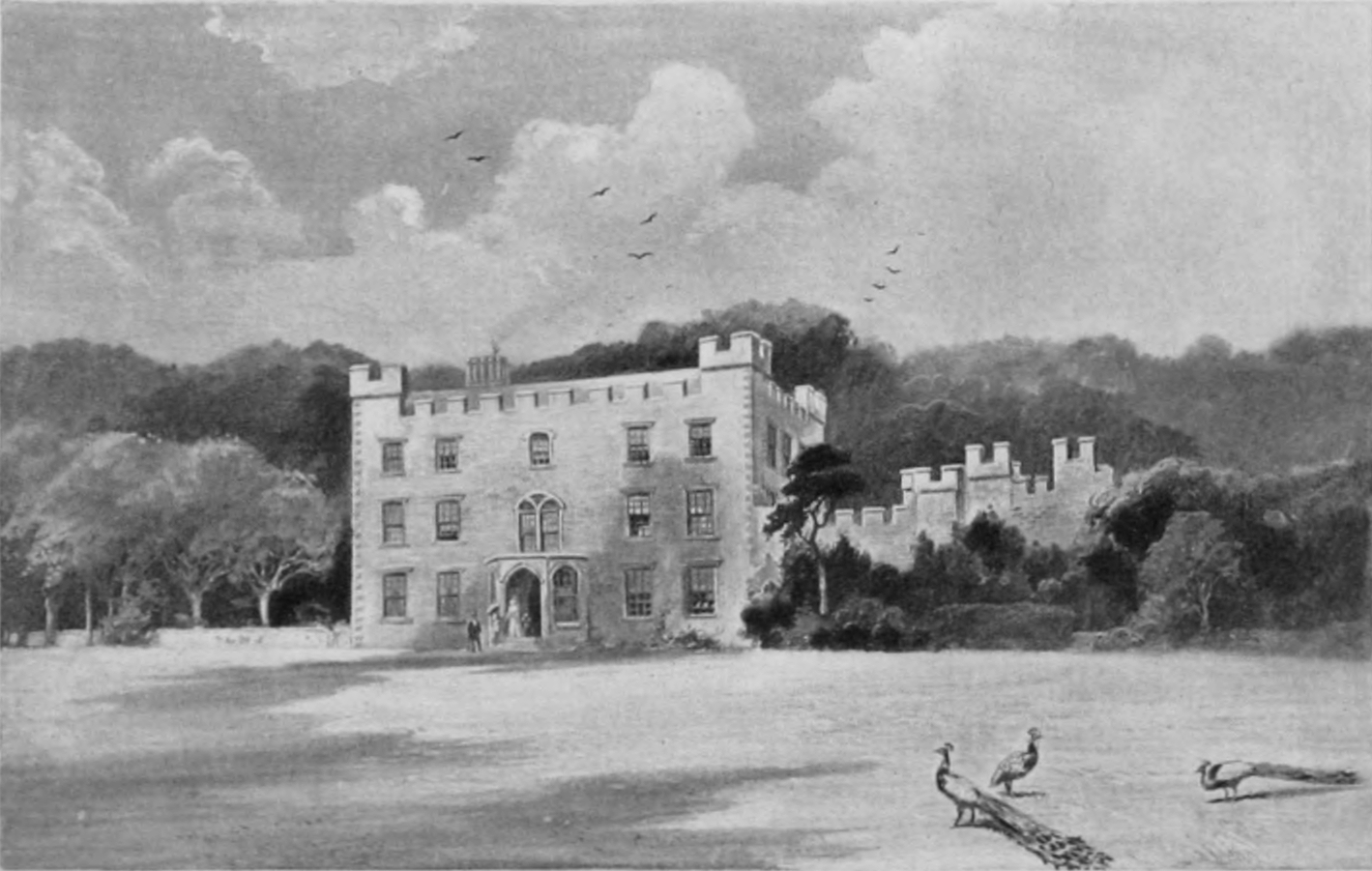
Coxhoe Hall, birthplace of Elizabeth Barrett Browning

Coxhoe Hall was a five-bay, 2 1/2-story house of c. 1725, built for John Burdon, on the site of a Tudor house. This plain, classical residence was later given a Gothic trim, with battlements and pointed windows. Poet Elizabeth Barrett Browning spent her early childhood there.

The earlier medieval house on the site belonged to the Blakiston Family from c.1400 to 1600, and afterwards to the Kennetts and the Earls of Seaforth (by the marriage in 1713/1714 of William Mackenzie, 5th Earl of Seaforth to Mary Kennett, the daughter and heiress of Nicholas Kennett). John Burdon, responsible for rebuilding the house, also created the landscape gardens at Hardwick Hall, near Sedgefield. The house was bought by the East Hetton Colliery Company in 1938 and was used to house Italian and German prisoners-of-war in WW2. The hall was condemned as unsafe by the National Coal Board and demolished in 1956, leaving the ground plan and service yard still visible. Cellars are now filled with rubble and appear to contain much decorative plaster work from the demolished structure. The drive and gate posts still remain, as does a walled garden to the north-east which is now much overgrown.

== Sport ==
- Coxhoe Athletic FC compete in the Wearside league and play their home games in Beechfield Park.
- Coxhoe Red Lion FC play in the Durham & District Sunday League, First Division with their home games being played at Landsdown Park.
- Coxhoe United play in the Durham Alliance League with their home games being played next to the FLIC Leisure Centre in Coxhoe Park.
- The (semi-professional) darts team included world BDO darts finalist Phil Nixon.

== Notable residents ==
- Elizabeth Barrett Browning - Eminent English poet of the Victorian era.
- Matthew Robson - Professional footballer (Hartlepool United and Carlisle United).
