= Egbert =

Egbert is a name that derives from old Germanic words meaning "bright edge", such as that of a blade. Anglo-Saxon variant spellings include Ecgberht (Old English pronunciation: [ˈedʒberˠxt]) and Ecgbert. German variant spellings include Eckbert and Ekbert.

== People with the first name ==
=== Middle Ages ===
- Ecgberht of Kent, king of Kent (ruled 664–673)
- Ecgberht of Ripon (died 729), Anglo-Saxon saint, monk and Bishop of Lindisfarne
- Ecgbert of York (died 766), Archbishop of York
- Ecgberht II of Kent (died c. 784), king of Kent
- Egbert of Saxony (fl. 756–811), Saxon nobleman
- Egbert of Lindisfarne (died 821), Bishop of Lindisfarne
- Egbert of Wessex, king of Wessex (ruled 802–839)
- Ecgberht I of Northumbria, king of Northumbria (deposed 872; died 873)
- Ecgberht II of Northumbria, king of Northumbria (ruled c. 876–883)
- Ekbert of Wetigau (fl. 889–c. 930), Saxon nobleman
- Egbert (archbishop of Trier) (c. 950–993)
- Egbert of Liège (fl. c. 1023), educator and author
- Egbert I, Margrave of Meissen (d. 1068)
- Egbert von Münsterschwarzach (d. 1076/7), abbot
- Egbert II, Margrave of Meissen (c. 1060–1090)
- Ekbert I of Tecklenburg (d. 1150), German count
- Eckbert of Schönau (d. 1184), abbot and biographer
- Ekbert von Andechs-Meranien (d. 1237), bishop of Bamberg
- Ekbert von Bentheim (d. 1335), ecclesiastic
- Egbert Hallihan, Duke of New Jersey (c. 1347)

=== Modern era ===
- Egbert Strijbos (born 1975), Dutch scientist and scholar and handy man with a diverse toolbox.
- Egbert Aglae (born 1980), Seychelles politician
- Egbert Bakker (born 1958), Dutch classical scholar
- Egbert Baqué (born 1952), German gallerist, author and translator
- Egbert Benson (1746–1833), New York jurist and politician, a founding father of the United States
- Egbert Brieskorn (1936–2013), German mathematician
- Egbert B. Brown (1816-1902), Union general in the American Civil War
- Egbert van Burmania Rengers (1745–1806), Frisian nobility and politician
- Egbert Cadbury (1893-1967), British Royal Navy First World War pilot and businessman
- Egbert Cleave (fl. 1870s), American author
- Egbert Nathaniel Dawkins III (born 1979), American musician known as Aloe Blacc
- Egbert van Drielst (1745-1818), Dutch painter
- Egbert von Frankenberg und Proschlitz (1909-2000), East German military leader and politician
- Egbert B. Groen (1915-2012), American politician and lawyer
- Egbert Hambley (1862–1906), British-born American mining engineer
- Egbert Hayessen (1913–1944), German World War II resistance fighter
- Egbert van Heemskerk (1634–1704), Dutch Golden Age painter
- Egbert Hirschfelder (1942–2022), German rower
- Egbert Ho (born 1978), Dutch field hockey player
- Egbert C.N. van Hoepen (1884–1966), Dutch paleontologist
- Egbert Jahn (born 1941), German political scientist
- Egbert Kankeleit (1929–2022), German nuclear physicist
- Egbert Xavier Kelly (1894–1945), Irish De La Salle Brother
- Egbert Bartholomeusz Kortenaer (1604-1665), Dutch admiral of the United Provinces of the Netherlands
- Egbert Adriaan Kreiken (1896–1964), Dutch teacher and astronomer
- Egbert Jans van Leeuwarden (1608–1674), Dutch clockmaker
- Egbert Lucas (1878–1958), British Anglican Archdeacon
- Egbert van 't Oever (1927–2001), Dutch speed skater and speed skating coach
- Egbert van der Poel (1621–1664), Dutch Golden Age painter
- Egbert Rimkus (died 1996), German tourist famous for disappearing in Death Valley
- Egbert Schuurman (born 1937), Dutch engineer, philosopher, and politician
- Egbert Stephens (born 1952), Guyanese cricketer
- Egbert Streuer (born 1954), Dutch sidecar driver
- Egbert Don Taylor (1937–2014), Jamaican Episcopelian bishop
- Egbert Ten Eyck (1779–1844), American lawyer and politician, US congressman from New York
- Egbert Van Alstyne (1878–1951), American songwriter and pianist
- Egbert van Kampen (1908-1942), Belgian mathematician
- Egbert Ludovicus Viele (1825-1902), American engineer, politician and Civil War brigadier general
- Egbert Wagenborg (1866–1943), Dutch shipowner and builder
- Egbert White (1894–1976), American war correspondent
- Egbert Austin Williams (1874–1922), Bahamian-American vaudeville comedian

== People with the surname ==
- Albert Gallatin Egbert (1828–1896), U.S. Representative from Pennsylvania
- Harry C. Egbert (1839–1899), US Army brigadier general
- James Chidester Egbert, Jr. (1859–1948), American classical scholar and educator
- James Dallas Egbert III (1962–1980), American college student involved in a widely covered disappearance
- Joseph Egbert (1807–1888), U.S. Representative from New York
- Rae L. Egbert (1891–1964), New York politician
- Sherwood Egbert (1920–1969), president of Studebaker-Packard Corporation
- William Egbert (1857–1936), Canadian physician and politician

== Fictional characters ==
- John Egbert, in the webcomic Homestuck
- Julie Egbert, a character from the Australian television series Prisoner, played by Jackie Woodburne
- Egbert B. Gebstadter, fictional author who appears in the works of Douglas Hofstadter
- Egbert, a chicken villager in the Animal Crossing series
- Egbert, antagonist in Winkler's novel The Duppy (1996)
