= Ebben =

Ebben is a Dutch name originating in the region around Nijmegen. The given name Ebbe can be a short form of Egbert or "Eber-" names like Eberhard. People with this name include:

- Anton Ebben (1930–2011), Dutch equestrian
- Bill Ebben (born 1941), American basketball player
- Debbe Ebben (born 1988), American beauty pageant
- Gary L. Ebben (born c. 1961), United States Air Force brigadier general

== See also ==
- Ebbers, surname of the same origin
