= List of rijksmonuments in Bloemendaal (town) =

The town of Bloemendaal has 125 listings in the register of rijksmonuments.

== List ==
Description	Original function^{?}	Built	Architect	Location	Coordinates^{?}	No.^{?}	Image
Oud Leyduin: wooden house, partially with windows down to the ground, shed roof and double tympanum	House	18th century			52°20′32″N 4°35′40″E	364845	Upload Photo
Former main office of the North Holland Province Electricity Company	Government building	1935	H.T. Zwiers	Ign. Bispincklaan 19	52°24′03″N 4°37′16″E	508167	
Building at the complex of the former hotel "Duin en Daal"	House	1907	J.A.G. van der Steur	Koninginneduinweg 13A	52°24′25″N 4°36′35″E	511066	
Building at the complex of the former hotel "Duin en Daal"	Hotel and catering	1899		Jozef Israelsweg 17	52°24′26″N 4°36′33″E	511067	Upload Photo
Former billiard room	Sport and recreation	1885		Parkweg 18A	52°24′00″N 4°36′46″E	511115	Upload Photo
Detached chicken coop	Farm	ca. 1900		Parkweg bij 18A	52°24′00″N 4°36′46″E	511116	Upload Photo
Iron fence consisting of bended bars, with an entrance to the site through a simple double gate	Boundary	1885		Parkweg bij 18A	52°24′00″N 4°36′46″E	511117	Upload Photo
Villa De Berg	House	1896		Rijperweg 15	52°24′05″N 4°36′51″E	511119	Upload Photo
Carriage house, part of the complex "De Berg", which was later used as a barn	Castle parts	1896		Rijperweg bij 15	52°24′05″N 4°36′51″E	511120	
Bloemendaal Water Supply: wall with an entrance gate	Boundary	1912		Hoge Duin en Daalseweg bij 21	52°24′16″N 4°36′14″E	511122	
Bloemendaal Water Supply: filtering building	Utilities	1901 or shortly thereafter		Hoge Duin en Daalseweg 21B	52°24′15″N 4°36′14″E	511123	Upload Photo
Saxenburg Estate	House	1919	J.W. Hanrath	Mollaan 1	52°24′23″N 4°36′41″E	511125	
Saxenburg: Garden created in the architectonic garden style	Garden, park and courtyard	1919-1922	D.F. Tersteeg	Mollaan bij 1	52°24′23″N 4°36′40″E	511126	Upload Photo
Villa Endymion	House	1908-1910		Koepellaan 2	52°24′17″N 4°36′57″E	511128	
Endymion: Gazebo	Garden, park and courtyard	1921		Koepellaan bij 2	52°24′17″N 4°36′57″E	511129	
Endymion: Three pairs of iron fence poles	Boundary	1909		Koepellaan bij 2	52°24′17″N 4°36′57″E	511130	Upload Photo
Endymion: pergola at the western side of the villa	Garden, park and courtyard	1921		Koepellaan bij 2	52°24′17″N 4°36′57″E	511131	
Lariksheuvel House	Castle, country house	1903	J. Mutters jr	Potgieterweg 3	52°24′15″N 4°36′59″E	511133	Upload Photo
Lariksheuvel House: a detached barn	Warehouse	1903		Potgieterweg bij 3	52°24′15″N 4°36′59″E	511134	Upload Photo
Former double service apartment	Servant's quarters	1875-1899		Brederodelaan 40	52°25′12″N 4°37′20″E	511138	Upload Photo
Schapenduinen House with the entrance porch	House	1930-1932	W. Hamdorff	Brederodelaan 135	52°24′49″N 4°37′07″E	511139	Upload Photo
White villa with rectangular corner towers and a double service building	House	1871	A. van der Steur	Donkerelaan 2	52°24′33″N 4°36′56″E	511140	
Villa "Duin-ouwe"	House	1883	J. van den Ban	Parkweg 18	52°23′58″N 4°36′47″E	511141	
Villa, transitional architectural style popular between 1880-1900, very early and rare example of a flat roof	House	1902		Rijperweg 14	52°24′06″N 4°36′42″E	511142	Upload Photo
Villa Tangkal Rambei	House	1894	J.W. Hanrath	Korte Parkweg 1	52°24′05″N 4°36′43″E	511148	Upload Photo
Villa Dunenburg	House	1901	J.A.G. van der Steur	Hoge Duin en Daalseweg 19	52°24′16″N 4°36′13″E	511149	
Villa Dennenoord	House	1902	J.A.G. van der Steur	Koninginneduinweg 7	52°24′28″N 4°36′24″E	511150	
Villa Dalhoeve	House	1900	J.A.G. van der Steur	Lage Duin en Daalseweg 29	52°24′13″N 4°36′34″E	511151	
Villa Dennenhoek	House	1899	Karel Muller	Midden Duin en Daalseweg 33	52°24′06″N 4°36′26″E	511152	
Former Montessori school; high school and primary school	Education and science	1930	J.H. Groenewegen	Vijverweg 27	52°24′10″N 4°37′24″E	511153	Upload Photo
Outbuilding, situated to the northwest of the main building, part of the former PEN complex (Provincial Electricity Company North Holland; Provinciaal Elektriciteitsbedrijf Noord-Holland). The design of the outbuilding is identical to the outbuilding situated to the southwest.	Utilities	1935	H.T. Zwiers	Ign Bispincklaan bij 19	52°24′03″N 4°37′16″E	514729	Upload Photo
Outbuilding, situated to the southwest of the main building, part of the former PEN complex (Provincial Electricity Company North Holland; Provinciaal Elektriciteitsbedrijf Noord-Holland). The design of the outbuilding is identical to the outbuilding situated to the northwest.	Utilities	1935	H.T. Zwiers	Ign Bispincklaan bij 19	52°24′03″N 4°37′16″E	514730	Upload Photo
Low long farm, the last remnant of Aelbertsbergweg	Farm	17/18th century		Aelbertsbergweg 1	52°24′36″N 4°36′41″E	9640	
Gepleisterd dwarshuis zonder verdieping onder pannen zadeldak. Vensters met negenruitsschuiframen en luiken. Achter het huis een bakstenen stal onder pannen schilddak	Flat	18th century			52°19′29″N 4°34′02″E	9641	Upload Photo
Diensthuis Vogelenzang, topgevels aan een zijde, dubbele topgevel	Servant's quarters	18th century			52°19′29″N 4°34′02″E	9642	Upload Photo
Pand, bestaande uit twee evenwijdige vleugels zonder verdieping onder zadeldak tussen puntgevels. Vensters met zesruits-schuiframen	Servant's quarters	ca. 1800			52°19′29″N 4°34′02″E	9643	Upload Photo
Gepleisterde duinwoning	House	18th century		Bekslaan 52	52°19′24″N 4°35′06″E	9646	Upload Photo
Boerderijtje, laag gebouw met topgevels, kleine roeden ramen met luiken.	Farm	18th century		Bergweg 3	52°25′00″N 4°36′57″E	9647	
Diensthuisje aan Vinkenbaan. Huisje met topgevel aan de achterzijde de Vinkenbaan. Achterzijde werd helaas deels verbouwd. Eerste steen "de terp Boudt 1831"	Servant's quarters			Bergweg 20	52°26′00″N 4°34′31″E	9648	
Dienstwoninkje in het duin, witgepleisterd, topgevel, met riet gedekt, terzijde bakhuisje	Servant's quarters	18th century		Bergweg 30	52°25′07″N 4°36′40″E	9649	
Bloemoord	House			Bloemendaalseweg 125	52°24′08″N 4°37′05″E	9650	
Dwarshuis, zonder verdieping en met pannen schilddak, waarin twee dakkapellen met geprofileerde lijsten. Gemetselde hoeklisenen. Geprofileerde gootlijst; getoogde vensters, eenvoudig bovenlicht	House	third quarter 18th century		Bloemendaalseweg 133	52°24′06″N 4°37′08″E	9651	
Sparrenheuvel	Castle, country house	18th century (deels)		Bloemendaalseweg 139	52°24′07″N 4°37′04″E	9652	
Voorduin	House	19th century		Bloemendaalseweg 88	52°24′11″N 4°37′09″E	9653	
Pand met gepleisterde lijstgevel	House	19th century		Bloemendaalseweg 94	52°24′10″N 4°37′07″E	9654	
Pand met gepleisterde lijstgevel	House	19th century		Bloemendaalseweg 96	52°24′10″N 4°37′07″E	9655	
't Hemeltje/Brederode	Hotel and catering	18th century		Bloemendaalseweg 102	52°24′09″N 4°37′06″E	9656	
Pand met lijstgevel	House	19th century		Bloemendaalseweg 108	52°24′09″N 4°37′06″E	9657	
Pand met lijstgevel	House			Bloemendaalseweg 120	52°24′08″N 4°37′05″E	9659	
Pand met lijstgevel	House			Bloemendaalseweg 122	52°24′08″N 4°37′04″E	9660	
De Voorbuurt	House	1700-1800		Bloemendaalseweg 126	52°24′08″N 4°37′04″E	9661	
Theekoepel van de Rijp	Castle parts	laat 18e eeuw		Bloemendaalseweg 138	52°24′05″N 4°36′59″E	9662	
Overbeek	Castle, country house	middle 19th century		Bloemendaalseweg 150	52°23′55″N 4°36′47″E	9663	
Tuinmanshuisje, landelijk, vroeger tot Lindenheuvel behoord hebbend, rieten dak	Servant's quarters	19th century		Bloemendaalseweg 162	52°23′48″N 4°36′45″E	9664	
Lage woning, gevel met rechte gootlijst, roedenverdeling vensters	House			Bloemendaalseweg 202	52°23′33″N 4°36′34″E	9665	
Lage woning, gevel met rechte gootlijst, roedenverdeling in vensters. Vormt een geheel met buurnummer 216	House			Bloemendaalseweg 214	52°23′32″N 4°36′34″E	9666	
Lage woning, gevel met rechte gootlijst, roedenverdeling in vensters. Vormt een geheel met het buurnummer 214	House	onbkeend		Bloemendaalseweg 216	52°23′32″N 4°36′34″E	9667	
Lage woning, gevel met rechte kroonlijst, in topgevels eindigend tentdak, roedenverdeling vensters	House	18th century		Bloemendaalseweg 252	52°23′19″N 4°36′27″E	9668	
Boerderij, fraai groot langhuis met statige topgevel, gedeeltelijk oude roeden vensters, rieten dak	Farm	18th century		Boekenroodeweg 1	52°21′39″N 4°35′56″E	9669	
Boekenrode. Statig landhuis, houten deurpartij echter enorm uitgebreid. Fraai theehuis	Castle, country house	einde 18e eeuw		Boekenroodeweg 9	52°21′23″N 4°35′52″E	9670	
Boerderij, dwarshuis, vensters met oude roeden, halve luiken, laag gebouw met riet gedekt	Farm			Boekenroodeweg 35	52°21′16″N 4°35′48″E	9671	
Kerkje Provinciaal Ziekenhuis, portierswoning, ingangshek en torenuurwerk	Church or part	19th century		Brederodelaan 52	52°25′08″N 4°37′17″E	9672	
Provinciaal Ziekenhuis	Hospital	1839			52°25′08″N 4°37′12″E	9673	
Caprera. Twee bouwfragmenten, grens- of stoeppalen	Boundary marker			Brederodelaan 145	52°24′41″N 4°36′59″E	9674	Upload Photo
Grenspaal 'B.G.' (Grouwersgilde)	Boundary marker			Brouwerskolkweg bij 5	52°23′20″N 4°35′55″E	9675	
Carriage house, barn and the garden wall en tuinmuur	Castle parts	18/19th century		Donkerelaan 57A	52°24′29″N 4°37′19″E	9676	
Pand, bestaande uit een aantal onregelmatig gegroepeerde vleugels onder pannen schild- en wolfdaken	House	18th century		Donkerelaan 53	52°24′28″N 4°37′20″E	9677	
Kraantje Lek	Hotel and catering	18th century		Duinlustweg 22	52°22′58″N 4°35′30″E	9678	
Lage woning, dubbele topgevel, kleine roedenvensters. Nabij de oude Volmeer	House	18th century			52°22′30″N 4°35′32″E	9679	Upload Photo
Gemetselde poort, hekpijlers voormalige Duinvliet	Garden, park and courtyard	18th century		Duinvlietspad bij 4	52°22′35″N 4°36′03″E	9681	
Lage dienstwoningen, oude roedenvensters	Servant's quarters	18th century		Elswoutslaan 5	52°22′55″N 4°36′01″E	9682	
Boerenhuis, bestaande uit begane-grond met hoog zadeldak	Farm	first half 19th century		Graaf Florislaan 2A	52°19′14″N 4°34′38″E	9694	Upload Photo
Boerenhuis, bestaande uit twee evenwijdige vleugels zonder verdieping onder zadeldaken, die aansluiten tegen puntgevels. Vensters met negenruitsschuiframen	Farm	first half 19th century		Graaf Florislaan 2	52°19′14″N 4°34′39″E	9695	
"de Olifant". Lage woning met rechte kroonlijst	House	18th century		Van Haemstedelaan 2	52°22′19″N 4°35′29″E	9696	
Boerderij, langhuistype, met opkamer en uitgebreide schoorsteen	Farm	18th century		Kennemerweg 29	52°24′27″N 4°37′39″E	9697	
Wildhoef	Castle, country house	18th century		Kennemerweg 32	52°24′27″N 4°37′28″E	9698	
Fraai tuinpaviljoen. Louis XVI	Castle parts	18th century		Kennemerweg bij 32	52°24′25″N 4°37′26″E	9699	
Dorpskerk	Church or part	1635/1936		Kerkplein 1	52°24′24″N 4°37′22″E	9700	
Pand met gepleisterde lijstgevel	House	18th century		Kerkplein 19	52°24′24″N 4°37′20″E	9701	
Pand met langgerekte lijstgevel, onder mansardedak; voor de ramen ijzeren hekken, benedenramen reiken tot aan de grond. Vormt een geheel met het buurnummer 24	House	19th century		Kerkplein 23	52°24′23″N 4°37′22″E	9702	
Pand met langgerekte lijstgevel, onder mansardedak, voor de ramen ijzeren hekken, benedenramen reiken tot aan de grond. Vormt een geheel met het buurnummer 23	House	19th century		Kerkplein 24	52°24′23″N 4°37′22″E	9703	
Voormalig schoolgebouw. Pand met lage verdieping en pannen zadeldak. Aan de voorzijde, te weerszijde van de poort, twee uitbouwsels onder zadeldaken met cordonlijst, getoogde vensters en getoogde deuren	Education and science	second quarter 19th century		Kerkplein 25	52°24′22″N 4°37′23″E	9704	
Lage landelijke gepleisterde woning met dubbele topgevel, kleine roeden, blinden	House			Kleverlaan 2	52°23′58″N 4°37′02″E	9705	
Laag woonhuis	House			Kleverlaan 6	52°23′57″N 4°37′02″E	9706	
Lage woning met topgevel. Voor enige jaren achterwaarts geplaatst	House	18th century		Korte Zijlweg 8	52°23′17″N 4°36′24″E	9707	
Lage gepleisterde woning	House	18th century		Korte Zijlweg 10	52°23′17″N 4°36′22″E	9708	
Complex lage woningen	House	18th century		Laan van Boreel 1	52°24′25″N 4°37′37″E	9709	
Carriage house of Duin en Daal	Castle parts	possibly 18th century (founded); 19e eeuw (new exterior)		Lage Duin en Daalseweg 15A	52°24′25″N 4°36′39″E	9710	
Duin en Daal	House	18th century		Lage Duin en Daalseweg 8	52°24′25″N 4°36′36″E	9711	
Boerderij, langhuis met topgevel, terzijde uitgebouwd kookhuis en afdak waarlangs duinbeek stroomt, zeer fraai gelegen	Farm			1e Leijweg 3	52°20′38″N 4°34′57″E	9712	
Vinkenhuisje in Vinkenbaan. Lage woning	House			Afgebrand jachthuis Leyweg I 4	52°24′51″N 4°35′12″E	9713	
Woestduin	Castle parts	18th century (gate and a part of carriage house)		Manpadslaan 2	52°20′13″N 4°35′33″E	9714	
Jachthuis, lage landelijke woning in topgevels eindigend	House	18th century		Vogelenzangseduinweg; afgebrand Vogelenzangseduinweg	52°24′51″N 4°35′12″E	9715	Upload Photo
Hek Groot Bentveld. Hekpijlers met bekroning	Boundary	18th century		Grenslaan bij 20	52°21′49″N 4°34′43″E	9716	
Hek van Saxenburg. Hardstenen pijlers en hekken	Boundary	19th century		Mollaan 1	52°24′23″N 4°36′40″E	9717	
Pannekoekhuis bij het Bloemendaalsebos	Servant's quarters	18th century (woning) aanvang 19e eeuw (koepel)		Mollaan 2	52°24′19″N 4°36′47″E	9718	
IJskelder van het voormalige landgoed Saxenburg	Castle parts	19th century		Mollaan bij 7	52°24′09″N 4°36′59″E	9719	
Saxenburg	Boundary marker			Saxenburgerweg tegenover 1A	52°24′18″N 4°36′38″E	9720	
Boerderij langhuis, thans bungalow. Moderne schoorsteen doet afbreuk aan het aanzien	Farm	17th century			52°19′14″N 4°33′50″E	9721	
Boerderij langhuis met aangebouwde dwarshuizen, pannendak, deels vernieuwd	Farm	17th century (oorsprong)		Tweede Doodweg 18	52°19′11″N 4°34′01″E	9722	
Boerderij, langhuis met aanbouwen, deels rieten dak, hoge opkamer, fraai ex	Farm	17th century		Tweede Doodweg 24	52°19′26″N 4°34′14″E	9723	
Kleine woning met zadeldak en topgevels, kleine roeden vensters, tot Vogelenzang v.h.behorend	House	18th century			52°19′50″N 4°34′02″E	9724	Upload Photo
Jachthuisje (Brouwershuisje). Op Koekoeksduin. Zadeldak in topgevels eindigend, hoog souterrain met gewelven, eveneens bovengewelf. 1939 gerestaureerd	House	17th century		Vogelenzangseweg 3	52°20′56″N 4°35′44″E	9725	
Tuinmanshuisje van Koekoeksduin. Lage woning in topgevels eindigend	Servant's quarters	18th century		Vogelenzangseweg 17	52°20′44″N 4°35′07″E	9726	
Gepleisterd laag landelijke woning. Zadeldak	House	18th century			52°20′22″N 4°35′27″E	9727	Upload Photo
Vier grenspalen bij de villa van v.h.Dorhout Mees	Boundary marker			Vogelenzangseweg bij 25	52°20′43″N 4°35′17″E	9728	Upload Photo
Boerderij, dwarshuis, topgevel met pinakel, fraai ex, met aangebouwd kookhuis	Farm	17th century		Vogelenzangseweg 160	52°20′07″N 4°34′45″E	9729	
's-Gravenweg	Farm	17e en 18e eeuw		Vogelenzangseweg 164	52°20′02″N 4°34′38″E	9730	
Hartelust	House			Vijverweg 18	52°24′14″N 4°37′19″E	9731	
Gebeeldhouwde natuurstenen schamppaal	Street attribute	beginning of 17th century		Kennemerweg tegenover 32	52°24′23″N 4°37′28″E	9732	Upload Photo
De Haringbuis	House	18th century		Zandvoorterweg 77	52°21′40″N 4°35′59″E	9733	
Lage gepleisterde woning	House	18th century		Zandvoorterweg 64	52°21′40″N 4°35′57″E	9734	
Middenduin	House	18th century		Zeeweg 27	52°23′41″N 4°35′22″E	9735	
Tuinmanswoning, van voren rond uitgebouwde woning met rieten dak	House	19th century		Zomerzorgerlaan 4	52°24′34″N 4°36′42″E	9736	
Koepel Bosch en Hoven, verminkt	Castle parts	18th century		Zwarteweg 2	52°22′04″N 4°35′10″E	9737	
Pand met topgevel	Workshop	18th century		Zijlweg 7	52°23′17″N 4°36′30″E	9738	
Pand met topgevel	Workshop	18th century		Zijlweg 9	52°23′17″N 4°36′30″E	9739	
Pand met topgevel	House	18th century		Zijlweg 11	52°23′17″N 4°36′31″E	9740	
Lage woning deels met rechte kroonlijst, deels topgevel	House	18th century		Zijlweg 10	52°23′17″N 4°36′30″E	9741	
Vinkenhuisje op het terrein van Oud Aelbertsberg, achter het meertje van caprera	Castle parts			Duinwijckweg 14	52°24′41″N 4°36′38″E	9742	Upload Photo
Borstwering en twee schamppalen	Street attribute	ca. 1600 (schamppaal)		Bloemendaalseweg 158	52°23′48″N 4°36′45″E	9743	Upload Photo
Meerenberg: Main building	Hospital	1846-1848		Brederodelaan 54		525028	
Meerenberg: Morgue	Crematorium	1877	A. van der Linden	Brederodelaan bij 54		529427	Upload Photo
Meerenberg: Enterprise chimney	Industry	1919		Brederodelaan bij 54		529428	Upload Photo
Meerenberg: Three water pumps	Service building	1846-1848	J.D. Zocher jr.	Brederodelaan bij 54		529429	Upload Photo
