= Richard de Sancta Agatha =

English churchman and university chancellor

Richard de Sancta Agatha was an English medieval churchman and university chancellor.

Between 1256 and 1262, Richard de S. Agatha was Chancellor of Oxford University.

There is some confusion between Richard or Robert de Sancta Agatha being an Archdeacon of Durham.

Academic offices
Preceded by William de Lodelawe	Chancellor of the University of Oxford; 1256–1262	Succeeded by Thomas de Cantilupe
