= Libby Wilkinson =

Anglican priest (born 1965)

The Venerable Libby Wilkinson
- Archdeacon of Durham
- Diocese: Diocese of Durham
- In office: 2020 to present
- Predecessor: Ian Jagger

Orders
- Ordination: 2005 (deacon); 2006 (priest)

Personal details
- Born: 1965 (age 60–61)
- Denomination: Anglicanism
- Spouse: Jon Wilkinson
- Children: Rebecca; Hannah
- Education: St Edmund Hall, Oxford

Elizabeth Mary "Libby" Wilkinson (born 1965) is an Anglican priest. Since 2020, she has been Archdeacon of Durham in the Church of England's Diocese of Durham

Wilkinson was educated at st Edmund Hall, Oxford. Before ordination she worked for Norwich Union. Her first post was a curacy in Gateshead. She was then priest in charge at Burnmoor. She was the area dean for Houghton-le-Spring. She was Vicar of Bishopswearmouth from 2016 to 2020, since when she has been the archdeacon of Durham.
