= James Egbert =

James Egbert may refer to:

- James Chidester Egbert Jr. (1859–1948), American classical scholar and educator
- James Dallas Egbert III (1962–1980), American student incorrectly alleged to have disappeared in the steam tunnel incident
