= Samuel Dickens =

Samuel Dickens may refer to:

- Samuel Dickens (priest) (1719–1791), Church of England priest, archdeacon of Durham from 1760 to 1791
- Samuel Dickens (politician) (c. 1775–1840), American politician
