= Biham =

Biham is a surname. Notable people with the surname include:

- Eli Biham (Hebrew: אלי ביהם) is an Israeli cryptographer and cryptanalyst, currently a professor at the Technion Israeli Institute of Technology Computer Science department.
- Gilbert de Biham was an English medieval churchman, singer, and university chancellor. Gilbert de Biham was a chantor and Canon of Wells Cathedral.
- Ofer Biham is a faculty member at The Racah Institute of Physics of the Hebrew University of Jerusalem in Israel.
