= Huddersfield New College =

Sixth form college in Huddersfield, West Yorkshire, England

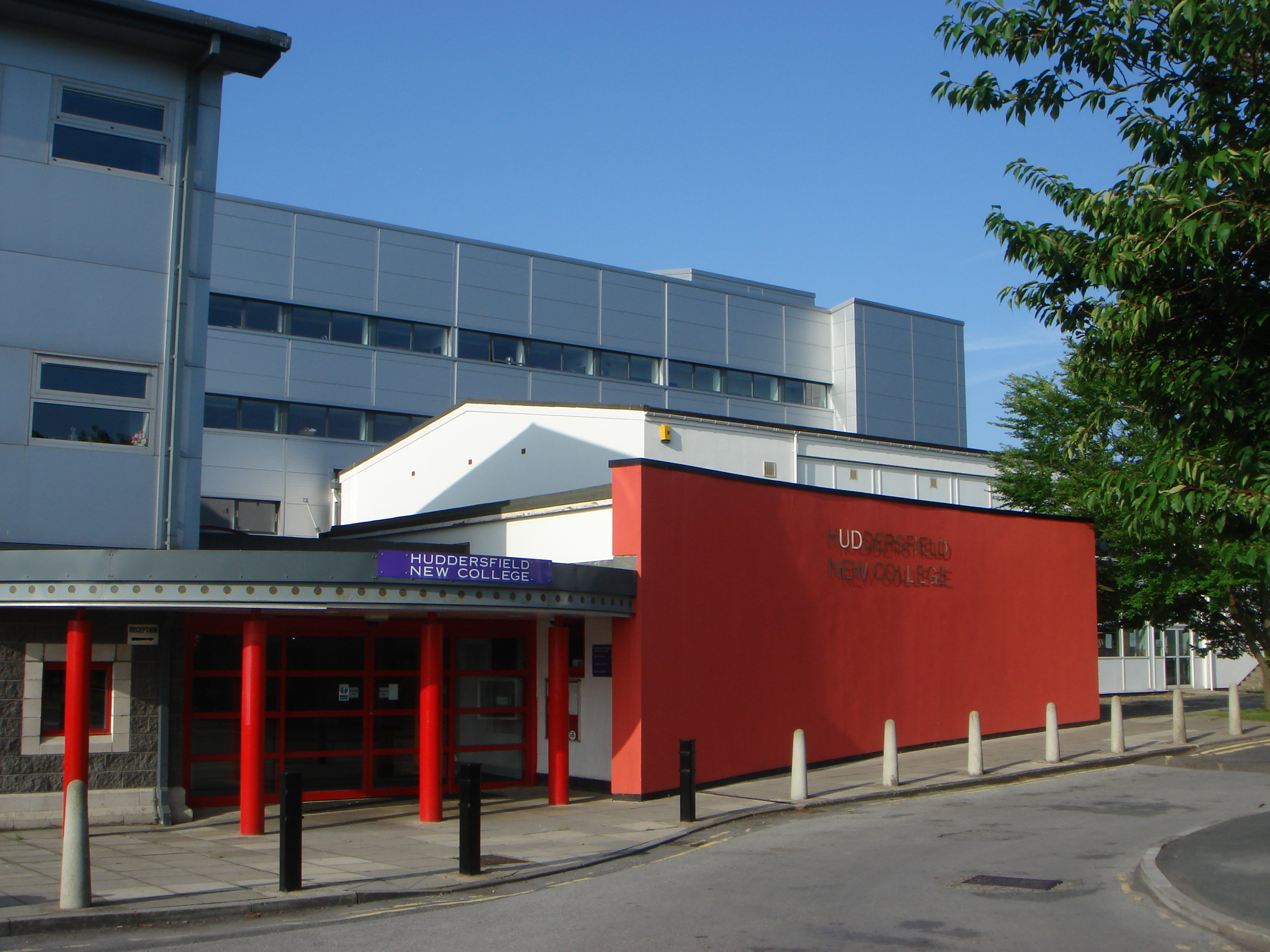

Location
- New Hey Road; Huddersfield, West Yorkshire, HD3 4GL; England; 53.653°N 1.838°W

Information
- Type: Sixth Form College
- Motto: Success For All
- Established: 1958
- Local authority: Kirklees
- Department for Education URN: 130539 Tables
- Ofsted: Reports
- Chairman of Governors: Andy Williams
- Principal: Marcus Smith-Connor
- Gender: Coeducational
- Age: 16 to 18
- Enrolment: c. 2,600
- Colour
- Website: http://www.huddnewcoll.ac.uk

Huddersfield New College is a former grammar school and current sixth form college located in Salendine Nook on the outskirts of Huddersfield, in the county of West Yorkshire, England. On 30 November 2023 the college was assessed as 'Good' following an OFSTED review

Huddersfield New College is situated to the west of the town, on New Hey Road (A640) less than a mile from junction 23 of the M62. It should not be confused with Huddersfield Technical College, which became Kirklees College in 2008.

In 2019 the college was recognised as the TES 6th Form College of the Year.

== History ==
=== Huddersfield College ===
Huddersfield College was founded in 1839. Henry Ernest Atkins, the chess master, was principal from 1909 to 1936.

=== Huddersfield New College as a boys' grammar school ===
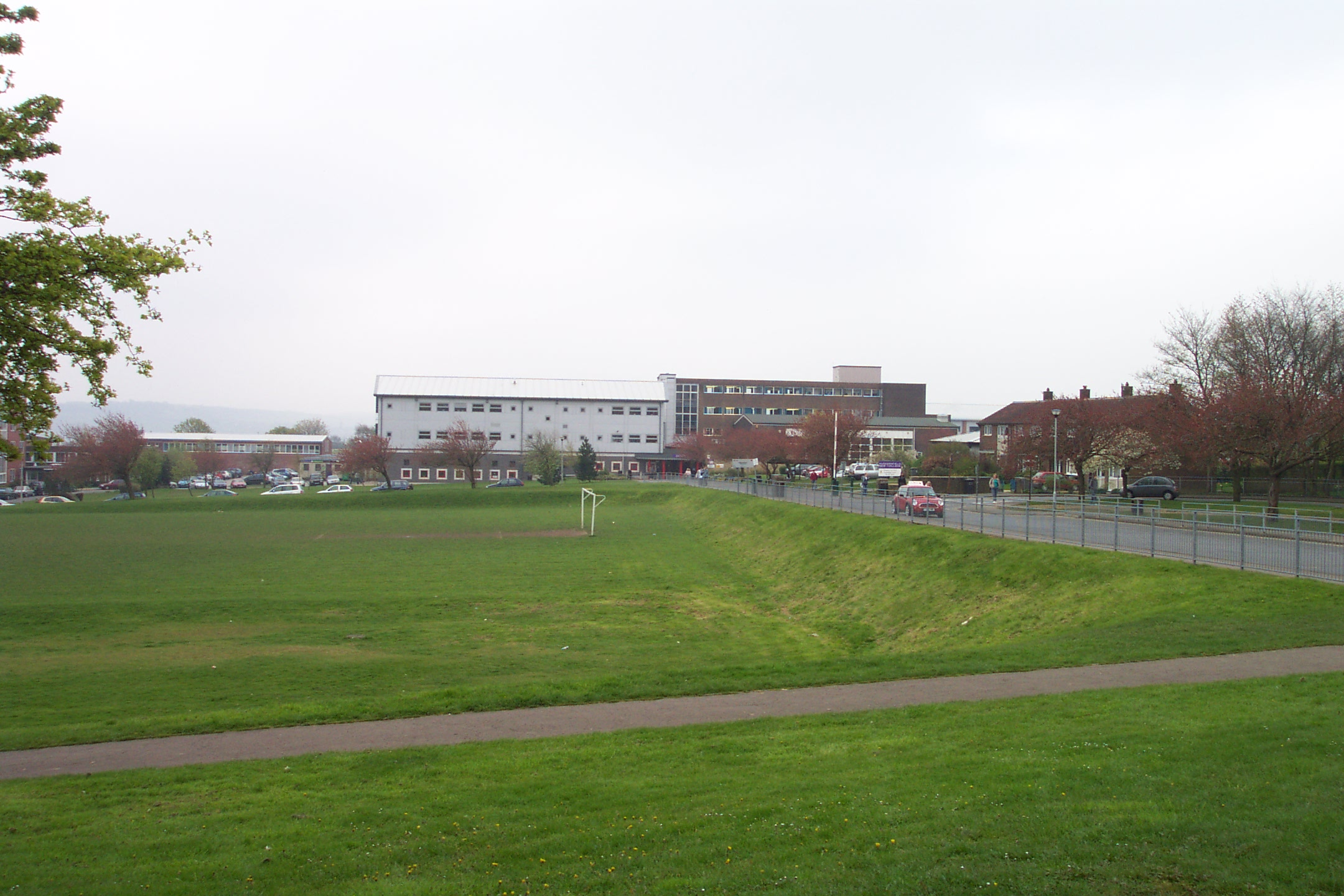
Huddersfield New College in 2005, as viewed from New Hey Road. Both the original brick construction, and the more modern partial replacement can be seen

Huddersfield New College was founded in 1958 when the existing Huddersfield College was merged with Hillhouse Technical School to form a new boys' grammar school at a new campus at Salendine Nook with 950 boys. In 1959, the girls-only Longley Technical High School moved to the campus, with a new school called Huddersfield High School also on New Hey Road with 700 girls run by Huddersfield Education Committee. Princess Margaret opened the girls' school on the campus on 14 November 1958. The whole site, including Salendine Nook High School, had cost £1 million. Sir Edward Boyle opened Huddersfield New College on 26 March 1958.

The last admission of 11-year-olds was in 1972, and the college then began a gradual transition from a boys only grammar school to a co-educational sixth form college. During the dissolution of the grammar schools under Harold Wilson's watch (an old boy of the nearby Royds Hall Grammar School), he infamously said that grammar schools would be dismantled over his dead body. However the sixth form college has retained much of the academic-minded ethos of his former school.

=== Huddersfield New College as a co-educational sixth form college ===
It became a sixth form college when the two grammar schools, Huddersfield New College and Huddersfield High School, gradually merged from 1973. In 1974 it was administered by Kirklees Metropolitan Council until 1993 when funded by the FEFC. In 2001 it was administered by West Yorkshire LSC, whose executive director was Margaret Coleman, a former principal of the college.

== Buildings ==
More recently, the eastern half of the original 1958 built building has been demolished, and replaced with a modern construction grafted onto the remaining half of the original building.

In January 2007 building works commenced to expand the current school to increase capacity. New buildings will house additional classrooms for Geography, Art, Psychology, Textiles, Modern Languages, IT, Media Studies and a new student dining area (known as the IT Café by students). Additional expansion to 'The Boiler House' – the current performing arts area is also commencing, yielding increased classrooms a recording studio and a new theatre. There has also been expansion to the sports centre, which now houses: Sports Studies, Travel and Tourism, Sociology, Health and Social Care, Children's Learning, Care and Development. Also a large gym with state-of-the-art equipment, and a large sports hall.

In September 2012 the college completed the construction of a £100,000 3G AstroTurf pitch which is also used by the neighbouring Salendine Nook High School.

== Academic performance ==
In October 2011 the college was formally inspected by Ofsted, who praised the college and rated it as "a good college with outstanding features". Ofsted said that the college was showing a lot of improvement year-on-year and that the quality of teaching across all areas was good. All courses have high success rates, and students enjoy their time at the college.

On 17 May 2016 the college was assessed as 'Outstanding' in all 6 inspection domains following an OFSTED review. They are the first Sixth Form College to receive such an accolade under the new (September 2016) inspection framework.

== Notable alumni ==
=== Huddersfield New College ===
- Roger Berry, Labour MP from 1992 to 2010 for Kingswood
- Professor Bob Cryan, vice-chancellor of the University of Huddersfield
- James Duddridge, Conservative MP since 2005 for Rochford and Southend East
- Ian Jagger, clergyman and Archdeacon of Durham
- Zöe Lucker, actress
- Michael Moore, Fellow of the Royal Society and professor of theoretical physics at the University of Manchester
- George Sheldrick, Professor of Structural Chemistry since 1978 at the University of Göttingen

=== Huddersfield College ===
- H.H. Asquith, Prime Minister of the United Kingdom from 1908 to 1916
- Peter Armitage CBE, statistician and President of the Royal Statistical Society from 1982 to 1984, and Professor of Applied Statistics from 1976 to 1990 at the University of Oxford
- Sir William Broadbent, President from 1895 to 1896 of the Neurological Society and from 1887 to 1888 of the Clinical Society, and father of Walter Broadbent
- Joseph Coates, Australian schoolmaster and cricketer.
- William Henry Crossland, architect
- Roger Fletcher, Professor of Mathematics from 1993 to 2005 at the University of Dundee
- Geoffrey Fryer FRS, freshwater biologist
- Sir Amos Brook Hirst OBE, chairman from 1941 to 1955 of The Football Association, and president of Huddersfield Town F.C.
- David Liddiment, Director of Programmes at ITV from 1997 to 2002, and member of the BBC Trust
- Frederick Mallalieu, Liberal MP for Colne Valley from 1916 to 1922
- Ali Mazrui, Kenyan historian and political scientist
- Sir William Middlebrook, Liberal MP from 1908 to 1922 for Leeds South
- Walter Parratt, organist
- Sir Thomas Palmer Whittaker, Liberal MP from 1882 to 1919 for Spen Valley
- William Willis, Liberal MP from 1880 to 1885 for Colchester
- Sir German Sims Woodhead, President of the Royal Medical Society in 1878 and the Royal Microscopical Society from 1890 to 1899

=== Hillhouse Technical School ===
- Rt Rev David Bonser, Bishop of Bolton from 1991 to 1999

== See also ==
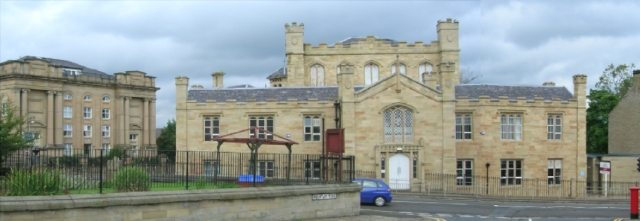
Former site of Huddersfield College, further near the town centre on the A640

- List of schools in Kirklees
