= William de Lodelawe =

English university chancellor

William de Lodelawe was an English medieval university chancellor.

Between 1255 and 1256, William de Lodelawe was Chancellor of Oxford University.

Academic offices
Preceded by Ralph de Sempringham	Chancellor of the University of Oxford; 1255–1256	Succeeded by Richard de S. Agatha
