= Bob Cryan =

British university vice-chancellor

- Born: 7 January 1964 (age 61)
- Education: University of Huddersfield Northumbria University Swansea University (MBA)
- Title: President of the Institution of Engineering and Technology Deputy Lieutenant of West Yorkshire
- Spouse: Kath Dolan (m. 1989)
- Children: 2

Bob Cryan CBE DL CCMI FREng FIET (born 7 January 1964) is a British professional with Chartered Engineer and Chartered Manager designations. He has served as the Vice-Chancellor and CEO of the University of Huddersfield since 2007. Cryan served as the President of the Institution of Engineering and Technology from 2022 to 2023.

== Early life ==
Cryan was born in 1964 in Huddersfield, England. His parents were working class and neither had the opportunity to complete secondary education so they encouraged him to go as far as he was able. He was not entered for the 11+ examination and attended Deighton Secondary School, Huddersfield. At 16 he tried and failed to get an apprenticeship and went to Huddersfield New College to study Maths, Physics and Chemistry.

== Education ==
Cryan gained a First-Class Honours degree in Electrical and Electronic Engineering at what is now the University of Huddersfield, graduating as top student and receiving the IEE (now IET) award for Academic Distinction. In 1992 he was the first person to be awarded a PhD, completed on a part-time basis and sponsored by British Telecom, from the University of Huddersfield and in 1999 he was the first person to be awarded the higher doctorate degree of Doctor of Science from the University of Huddersfield. He completed a PhD in Leadership and Management with Northumbria University and an MBA with Swansea University. Whilst Vice-Chancellor, he wanted to remind himself what it was like to be a student and completed an Open University degree in Mathematics in 2013, graduating with First Class honours.

== Career ==
During his first degree Cryan secured sponsorship from Thorn EMI Electronics and on graduating he took up employment with their Defence Systems Division in Feltham, Middlesex. In 1986 he was appointed as a Lecturer in the Department of Electrical and Electronic Engineering at what is now the University of Huddersfield. Four years later he was promoted to Senior Lecturer and in 1992 he took on the role of Director of the Centre for Communication Systems Research in the Faculty of Engineering at Manchester Metropolitan University. In 1994 he was appointed to his first Professorial Chair and Head of Department position, at the age of 30, at Northumbria University and at the time he was the youngest Professor of Engineering in the UK. Following his success as Head of the Department of Electrical, Electronic Engineering and Physics he was appointed as Head of the newly created School of Engineering, following a merger with the Department of Mechanical Engineering and Manufacturing Systems. He moved to the University of Wales, Swansea in 1999 to be Chair of Electrical & Electronic Engineering. He also held the Siemens Chair of Communications and the post of Dean of the Faculty of Engineering.

In 2002 he returned to Northumbria University as Pro Vice-Chancellor, becoming Deputy Vice-Chancellor in 2005, with responsibilities including both teaching and research. In 2007 he returned to his hometown of Huddersfield and at the age of 42, became Vice-Chancellor and CEO of the University of Huddersfield and at the time he was the youngest Vice-Chancellor in the UK. Under his leadership the University has won many awards including the Times Higher Education (THE) University of the Year, THE Entrepreneurial University of the Year, THE Best University Workplace, THE Outstanding Leadership Team, two Queen’s Awards for Enterprise, three Queen’s Anniversary Prizes, the Gold Teaching Excellence Award and Huddersfield was the first University to win the Global Teaching Excellence Award.

In April 2024, Cryan announced that nearly 200 staff at Huddersfield University would be made redundant.

== Other roles ==
Cryan is on the Board of Trustees and is a former President of the Institution of Engineering and Technology, an organization of over 155,000 members from 148 countries and started his one-year term as President in October 2022.

He also serves on the board of trustees of the Chartered Management Institute, the Chartered Body for Management and Leadership that has a membership of over 170,000. He Chairs the CMI Board of Companions that appoints and represents a select group of the best leaders in the UK and beyond.

He chairs the Board of Trustees for the Inspiring Digital Enterprise Award, iDEA, an international award-winning program that helps develop digital, enterprise and employability skills for free through the completion of online digital badges. To date, over ten million badges have been completed.

He serves on the board of trustees for the Foundation of Dragon’s Den celebrity and entrepreneur Peter Jones CBE which has supported the development of entrepreneurial skills of thousands of young people.

He is a Deputy Lieutenant of West Yorkshire and is nominated to be High Sheriff of West Yorkshire in 2024.

Cryan’s previous roles include Chairing Yorkshire Universities, serving on the board of the Leeds City Region Local Enterprise Partnership, serving as a board member of the Universities and Colleges Admissions Service and Chairing the Teachers Pension Scheme working group for the Universities and Colleges Employers Association.

== Personal life ==
In 1983 Cryan met Kath Dolan, a local textile mill worker, when she was 17 and he was 19. They became engaged in 1984 and married in 1989. They had two children.

== Honors and awards ==
- 2019: Business Person of the Year.
- 2019: Business and Education Award.
- 2016: Grant Thornton 100 Faces of a Vibrant Economy.
- 2015: Educate North Leadership Award.
- 2015: Appointed as Fellow of the Royal Academy of Engineering.
- 2014: Appointed as Companion of the Chartered Management Institute.
- 2014: Commander of the British Empire.
- 2013: Guardian Inspiring Leader.
- 2012: Appointed as a Deputy Lieutenant of West Yorkshire.
- 2009: Business Person of the Year: Examiner Business Awards.
- 2008: Lifetime Achievement Award.
- 1986: IEE Award for Academic Distinction
