= Ralph de Sempringham =

English churchman, theologist and university chancellor

Ralph de Sempringham (also Sempryngham, Semplyngham, or Sempyngham) was an English medieval churchman, theologist, university chancellor, and dean.

Between 1252 and 1255, Ralph de Sempringham was Chancellor of Oxford University. In 1254, he was elected Dean of Lichfield.

== See also ==
- Sempringham

Academic offices
Preceded by Gilbert de Biham	Chancellor of the University of Oxford; 1252–1255	Succeeded by William de Lodelawe
