= Ebbers =

Ebbers is a Dutch and Low German patronymic surname originating in the Achterhoek and neighboring areas in North Rhine-Westphalia. The given name Ebbe can be a short form of Egbert or "Eber-" names like Eberhard.

People with this name include:

- Bernard Ebbers (1941–2020), Canadian businessman convicted of securities fraud
- Denny Ebbers (1974–2015), Dutch judoka
- Marius Ebbers (born 1978), German footballer

== See also ==
- Ebbers, Edmonton, a neighborhood in northeast Edmonton, Alberta, Canada, built on the land of Dutch immigrant dairy farmer Johan/John Rudolph Ebbers (born 1895, Aalten).
