= Johanna Borski =

Dutch banker (1764–1846)

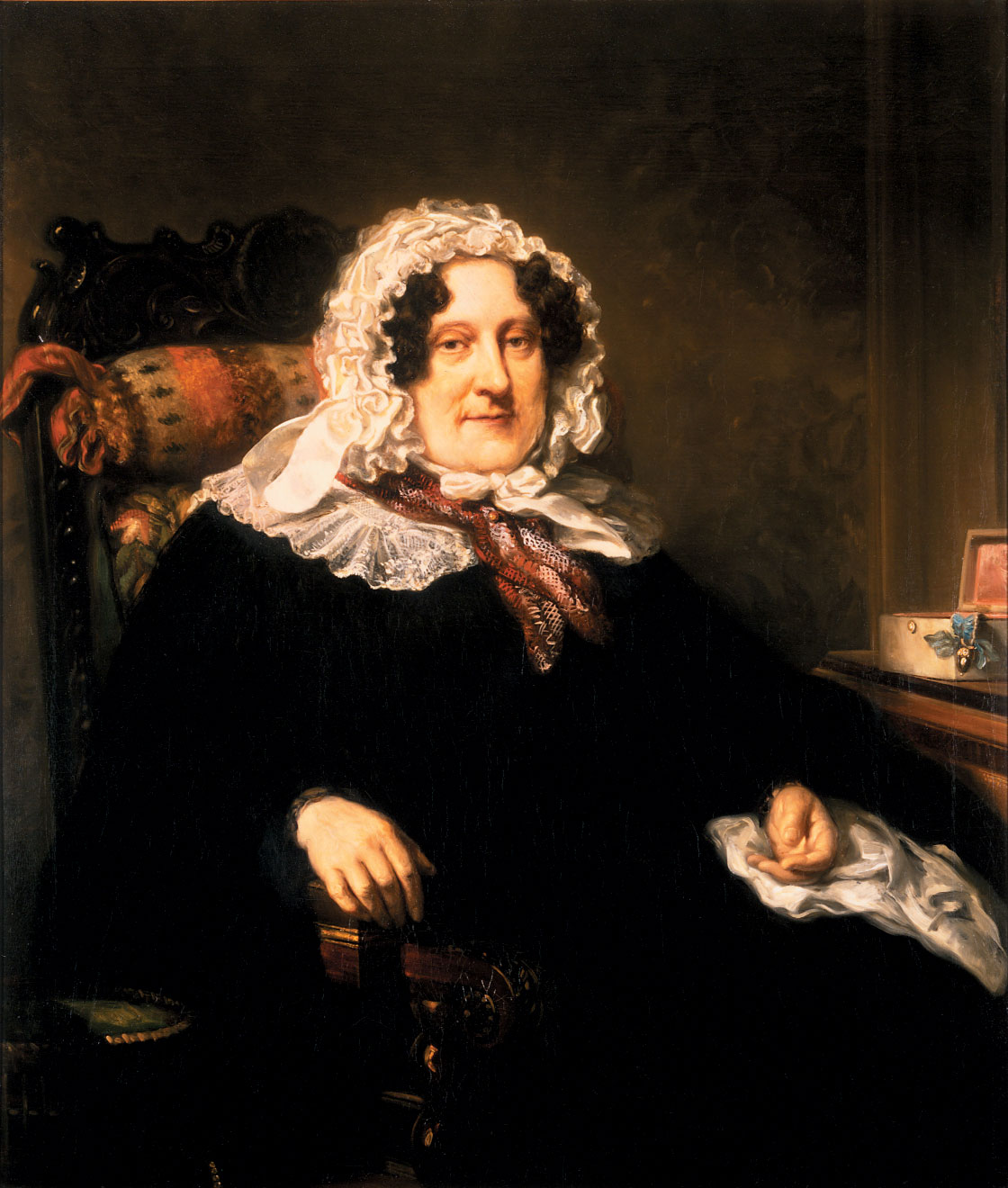
Johanna Borski in 1844, copy after Nicolaas Pieneman.

Johanna Borski (1764–1846), was a Dutch banker. She was the director of the "Wed. Borski" bank from 1814 to 1846. In 2022 Borski was in the news with regard to whether her wealth was due to slavery.

== Biography ==
She was born in Amsterdam to flax merchant Johannes van de Velde and Bruna Jacoba Schouten. She married the banker Willem Borski (1765–1814) on 19 December 1790 and they moved to the house Keizersgracht 566 which they bought in 1809. They had 5 daughters and 3 sons who lived to adulthood. Their summers were spent at their estate Elswout in Overveen, which they bought in 1805 and which at that time included Kraantje Lek.

During her marriage she assisted her husband, who became a successful businessman and was contracted regularly by Hope & Co. to conduct transactions on the Amsterdam exchange. In 1812 he was the second richest man in Amsterdam. When he suddenly died in 1814 Johanna decided to continue his business under the name Wed. W. Borksi, together with her husband's assistant Johannes Bernardus Stoop.

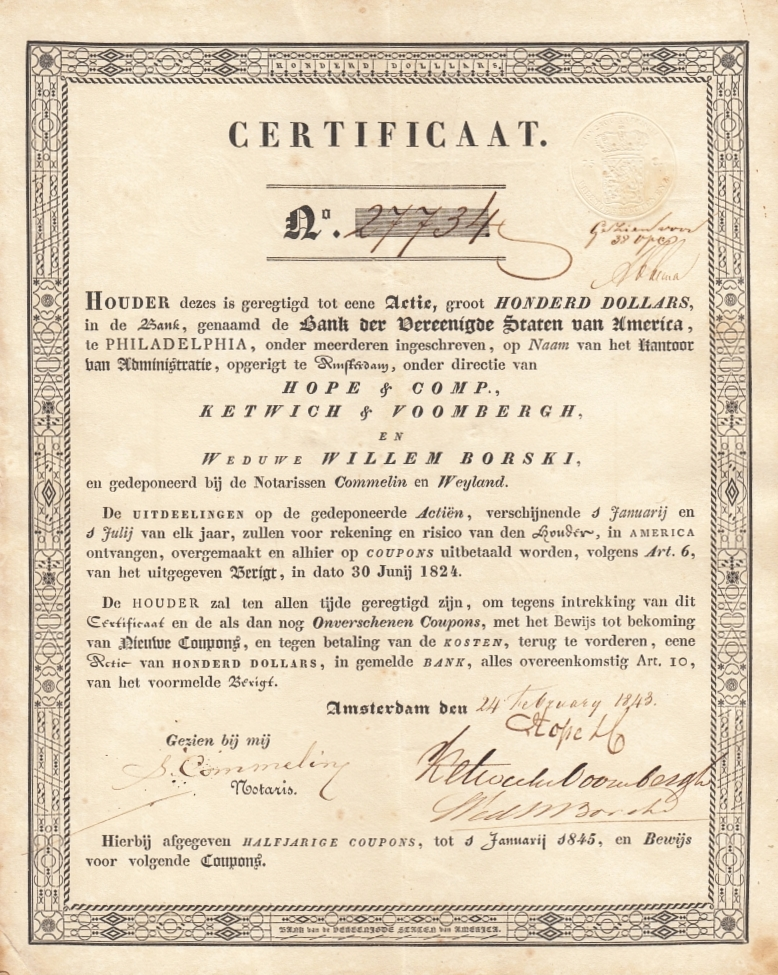
Share in the "Bank der Vereenigde Staten van America" from 1843, with signature Wed. M. Borski

Her most successful deal was supporting De Nederlandse Bank in 1816. She saved another bank, the Nederlandsche Handel-Maatschappij, in 1830 after it had given King Willem I some loans that he had demanded.

In 1832 Stoop left the firm to join Hope & Co. and her son Willem Borski II (1799–1881) took his place in 1832. Her company continued until 1884 when the name changed to Van Loon & Co.

On her estate in Overveen, Borski received notable guests such as Napoleon and his empress Marie Louise. Though the original main house had been built by Jacob van Campen, the Borskis preferred to stay in the gatehouse and her grandson Willem Borski III tore it down in 1882 to put up a modern palace, which he never finished.

Johanna Borski died in Amsterdam and was buried in the Nieuwe Kerk, Amsterdam, along with a few family portraits.

=== Depicted as a slaver in 2022 ===
In 2022 the Dutch newspaper the Volkskrant published an article about a study about the involvement of De Nederlandse Bank in slavery. The article suggested that Borski had become rich through her involvement in slavery, citing that her capital: had also been created by the revenues of some Surinam plantations with 565 slaves. In fact the study said that Borski financed a mortgage on these three plantations in 1804. The study furthermore noted that her involvement would at most have amounted to 650,000 Euro's in 2022 money, but that this would amount to only 1.5% of her wealth. The study furthermore noted that Borski did not advocate abolition, but was also not amongst the many businessmen who tried to dissuade the government from abolition.
