= William Franklyn (priest) =

English churchman

William Franklyn (1460–1556) was an English churchman, who became dean of Windsor.

== Life ==
Franklyn was born at Bledlow, Buckinghamshire, probably about 1460, and educated at Eton College and King's College, Cambridge, where he graduated B.C.L. in 1504. He took holy orders, and in 1514 was appointed chancellor of the diocese of Durham and receiver of the bishop's revenues.

In 1515 he became archdeacon of Durham and master of the Hospital of St. Giles at Kepyer, County Durham. In this and the following years Franklyn was active in directing measures in border warfare with the Scotch. His headquarters was at Norham, and it was probably about this period that a grant of arms was made him in consideration of the recovery of the castle at that place by his prowess and policy. In February 1518 he was installed prebendary of Heydour-cum-Walton in the diocese of Lincoln, and before 1522 he was rector of Houghton-le-Spring, Durham, and held the prebend of Eveston, in the collegiate church of Lanchester, in the same county.

On Thomas Wolsey's accession to the see of Durham he confirmed Franklyn in the chancellorship, with power of appointing justices of the peace, coroners, stewards, bailiffs, and other officers; and the chancellor made himself useful to the bishop in devising plans for increasing the revenues of the diocese. He was still chancellor under Cuthbert Tunstall, Wolsey's successor at Durham, but he already enjoyed marked proofs of Wolsey's favour. He received a salaried appointment as counsellor resident with Henry Fitzroy, Duke of Richmond, natural son of Henry VIII; was presented to the prebend of Stillington, Yorkshire, in February 1526, and in the same year became President of Queens' College, Cambridge, an office he held only a year and nine months.

His name appears in the commission formed, October 1528, to treat for peace with James V of Scotland, and he had a hand in the negotiations which led to the peace concluded 31 July 1534 at Holyrood. In May 1535 he was one of the council in the north executing the royal commission for assessing and taxing spiritual proceedings. On 17 December 1536 Franklyn was by patent appointed dean of Windsor, and in 1540 he exchanged his Lincolnshire prebend for the rectory of Chalfont St. Giles, Buckinghamshire, the parsonage attaching to which he afterwards let to John Storie.

As dean of Windsor he assisted at the christening of Edward VI and the funeral of Lady Jane Dudley, and his signature is affixed to the decree declaring the invalidity of the marriage of Henry VIII with Anne of Cleves. On 14 January 1545 he surrendered to the crown his hospital of Kepyer and most of his benefices, and he also alienated the revenues of his deanery, some temporarily, others in perpetuity. The complaints against him on this score were so loud that after the accession of Edward VI he was compelled to resign. He retired to Chalfont St. Giles, where he died in January 1556, and was buried in the church. His will met with disapproval, for a grant was made to one J. Glynne of so much as he could recover of goods, chattels, and money, devised by Franklyn for superstitious purposes. A large number of letters addressed by Franklyn to Wolsey, Thomas Cromwell, and others were preserved, in the Public Record Office and the British Museum.
