= Michael Perry (priest) =

Michael Charles Perry (1933–2015) was an Anglican priest and author.

Perry was born in Ashby de la Zouch on 5 June 1933 and educated at Ashby de la Zouch Boys' Grammar School; Trinity College, Cambridge; and Westcott House, Cambridge. After a curacy in Berkswich he was Chaplain at Ripon College Cuddesdon. He was Chief Assistant for Home Publishing at the SPCK from 1963 until 1970; and Archdeacon of Durham from 1970 to 1993.

He died on 22 January 2015.
