= Robert de Sancta Agatha =

13th-century English priest

Robert de Sancta Agatha was an English medieval archdeacon.

Robert was an Archdeacon of Northumberland. In 1256, he was elected but declined the position of Bishop of Carlisle. He was subsequently Archdeacon of Durham. He may also have been an official of in the Diocese of Lincoln.

== See also ==
- Richard de Sancta Agatha
