= Kraantje Lek =

Restaurant on the Duinlustweg in Overveen

Coordinates: 52°22′58″N 4°35′30″E

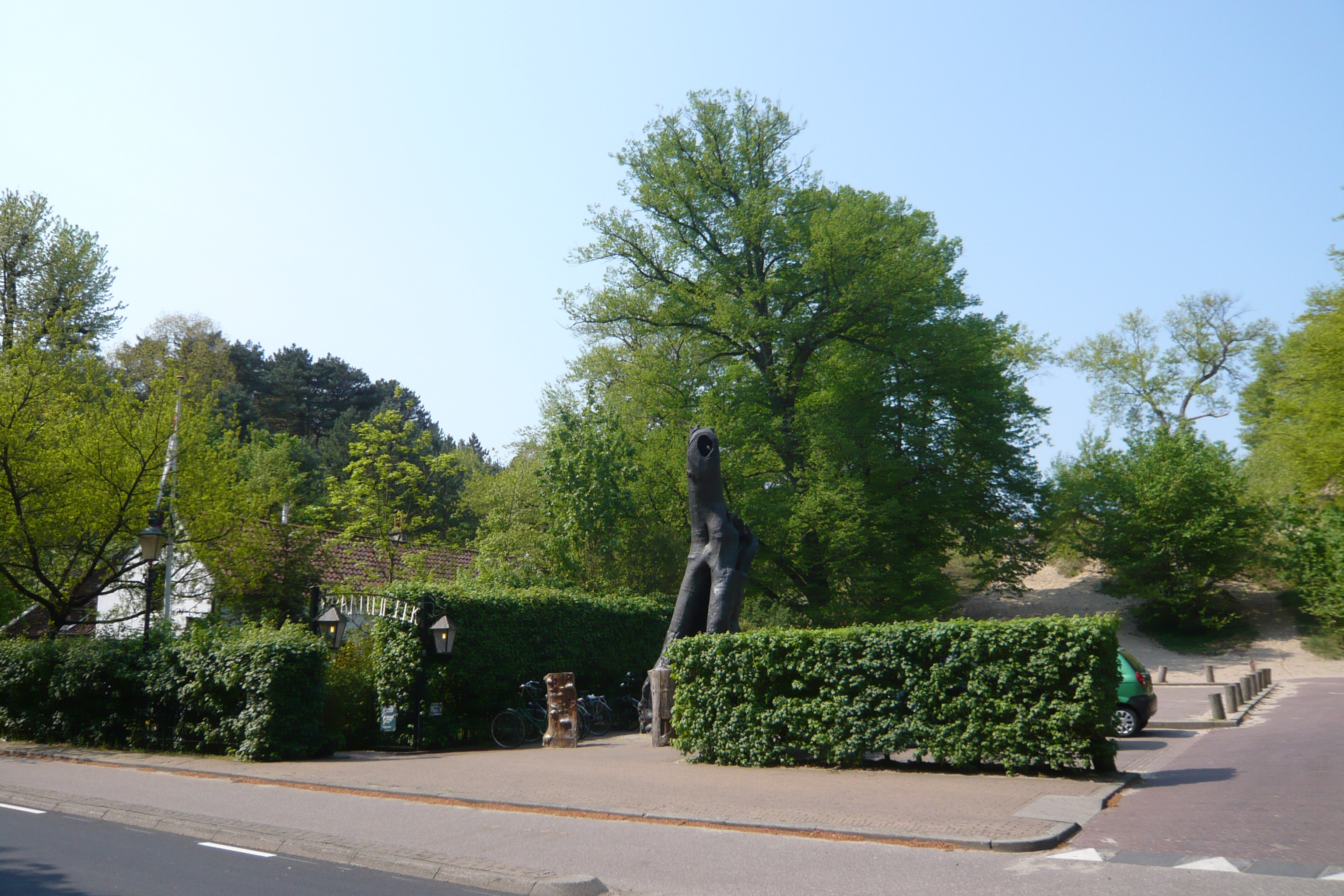
View of Kraantje Lek (left), the "Holle boom" (center) and the "Blinkert" (right)

Kraantje Lek is a pancake restaurant and former inn in Overveen, Netherlands, on the Duinlustweg.

It was originally built in 1542 as herberg Rockaers, or "inn of Rockaers", as Rockaers was the former name of the village of Overveen. It was strategically located at the base of a dune referred to as the "Blinkert", often used by sports teams in the area for training purposes. The Visserspad or "fishermen's path" passes it on the north side. The location was used as a place for fish sellers to stop on their way to and from Zandvoort on their way to the fish market on the Grote Markt, Haarlem. In more recent times the location is a pancake restaurant with a playground favored by families and it features in Nicolas Beets' stories of Haarlem in his Camera Obscura. Many children played in the Holle boom, or "hollow tree", located outside and memorialized in bronze today.

According to local legend, Frans Hals painted his fisher folk here and his portrait of Yonker Ramp and his sweetheart was painted inside in 1623. The painting, now in the collection of the Metropolitan Museum of Art, was on loan to the Frans Hals Museum for their jubileum exhibition on Frans Hals in 1937.

In 1805 the Amsterdam banker Willem Borski and his wife Johanna Borski bought Kraantje Lek for 65,000 guilders from Jacob Boreel, as part of the Elswout estate, together with the Blinkert and the large area of dunes behind it bordering on the Visserspad known as the "Zwarte veld", which was used as hunting grounds.

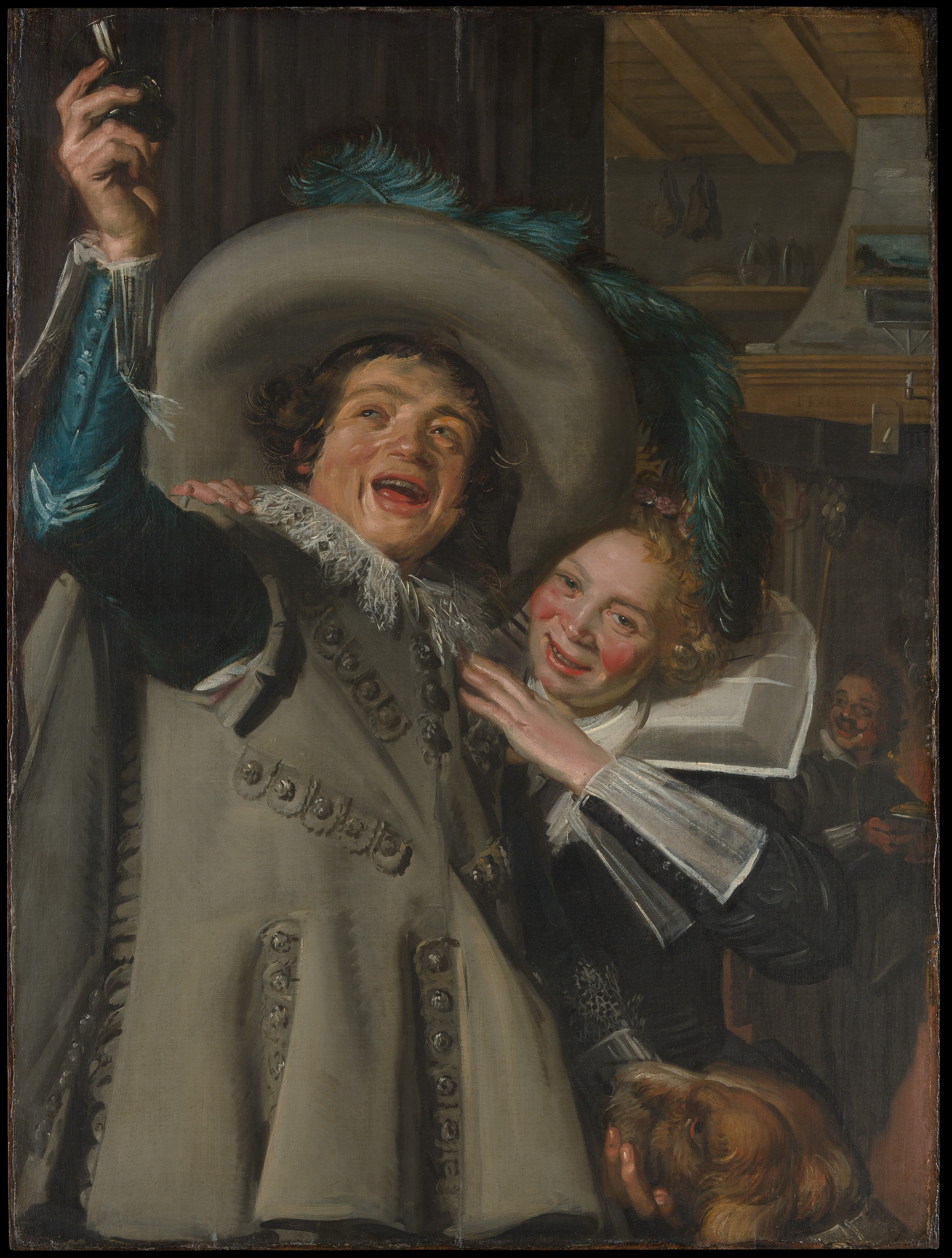
Yonker Ramp and his sweetheart by Frans Hals, 1623. The location was determined based on the crack above the fireplace (right)

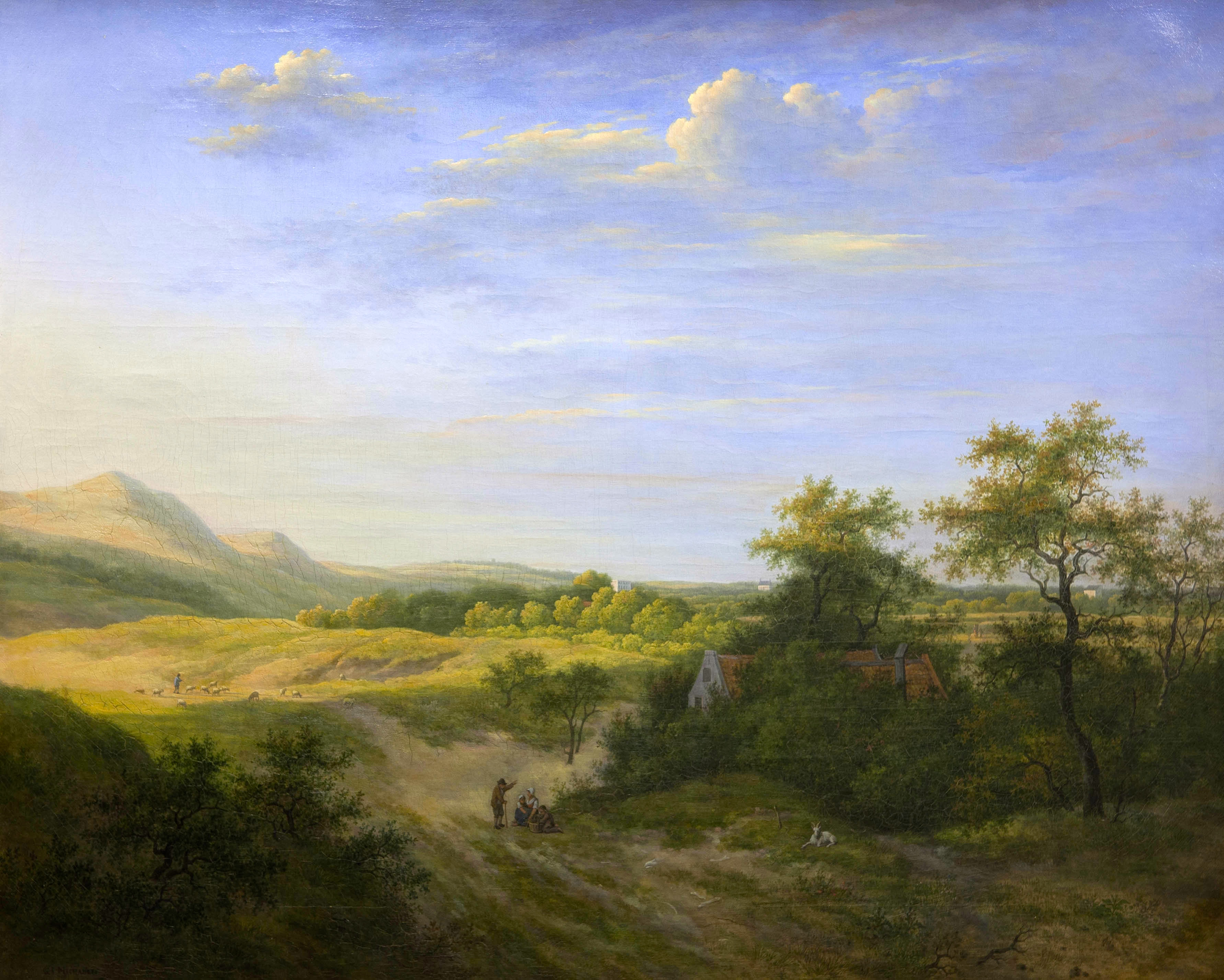
Painting by Gerrit Jan Michaëlis, 1824

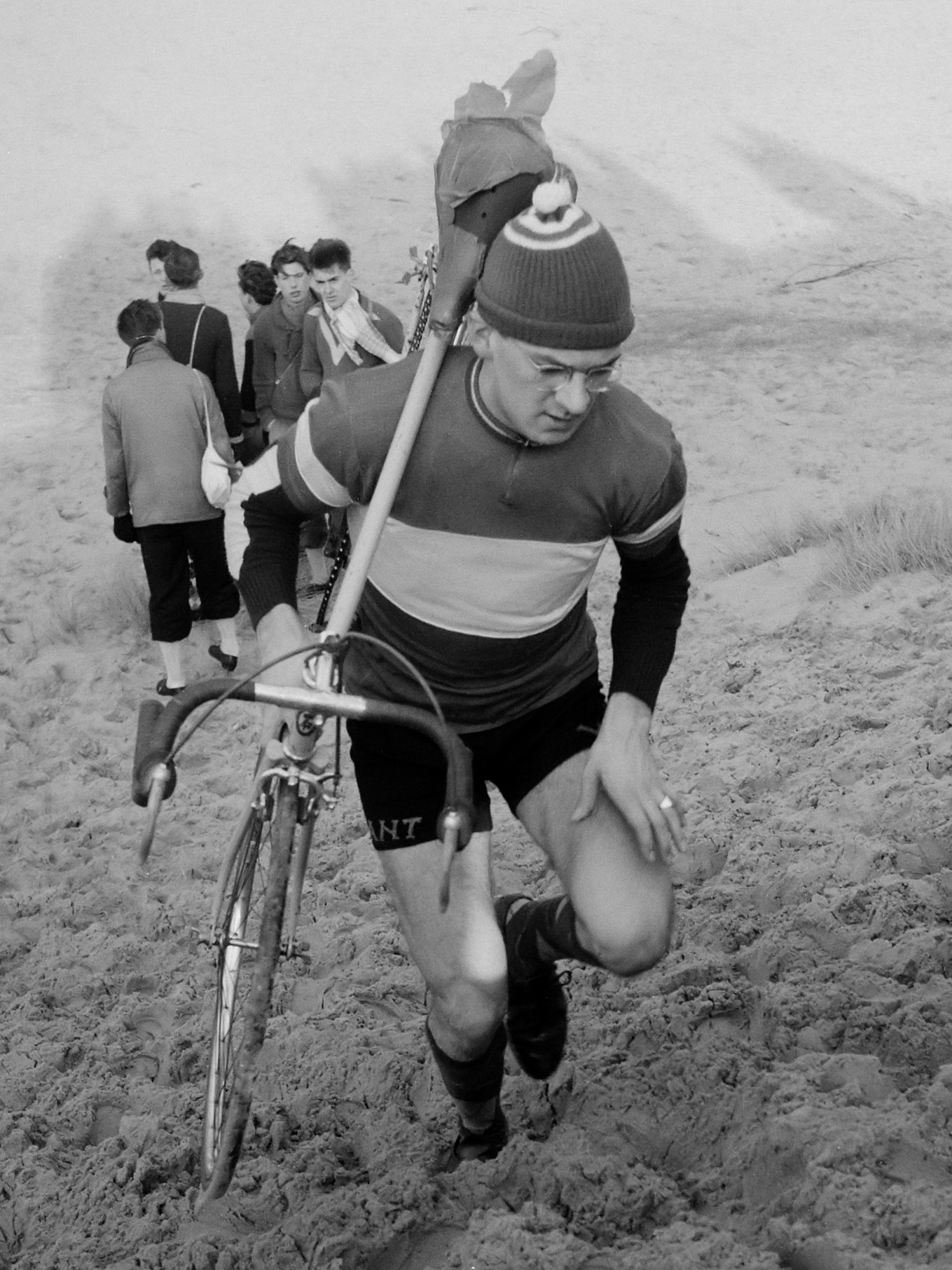
Cycle cross race in 1954 at the Blinkert

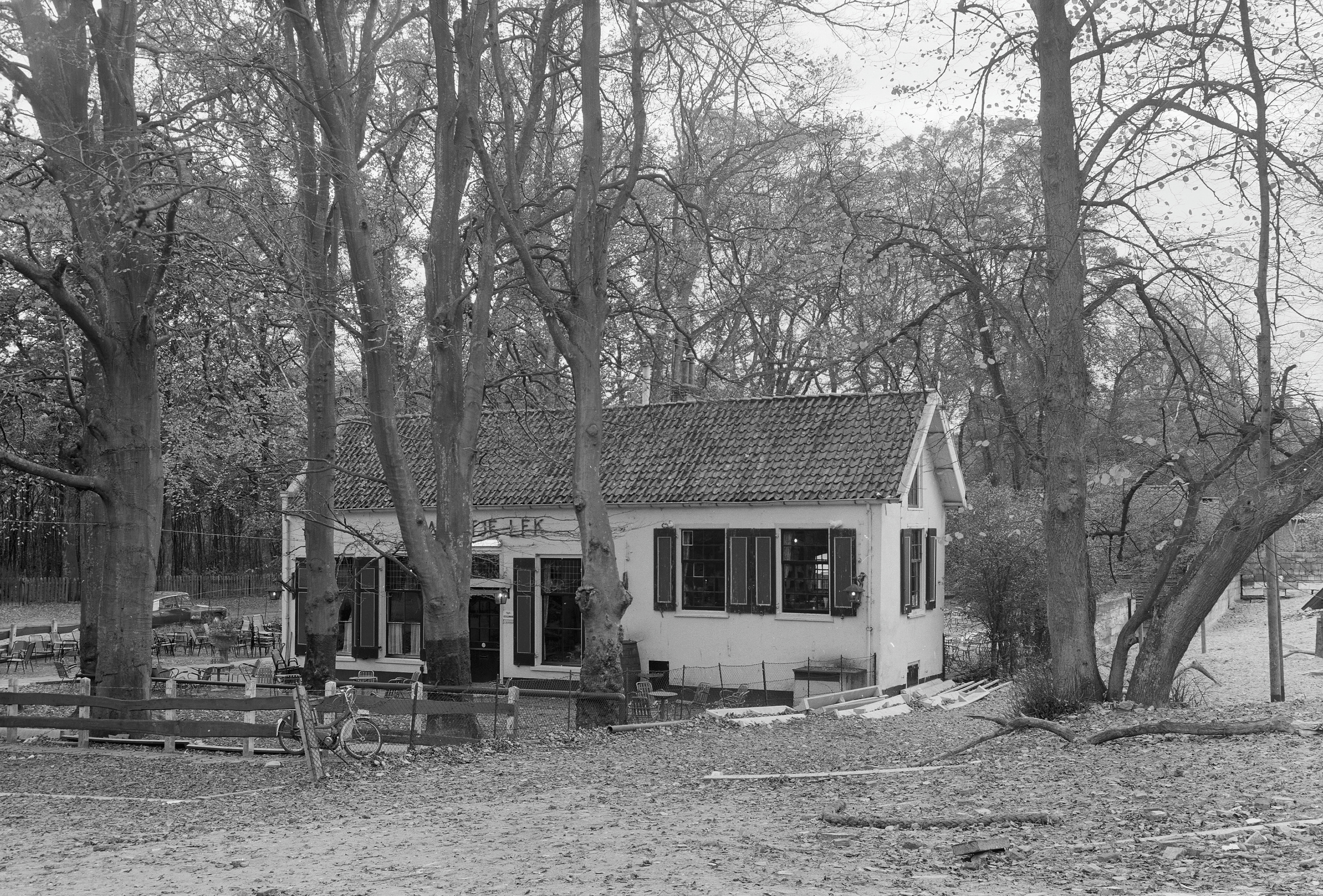
Kraantje Lek in 1968 (vooraanzicht)
