= George Sayer (priest) =

George Sayer was an Anglican priest in the mid 17th century.

Sayer was born in the parish of St Gregory in the City of London and educated at Oriel College, Oxford. He held the living at Witham from 1722, and the Archdeacon of Durham from 1730 until his death on 26 July 1761.
