= Egbert van Drielst =

Dutch painter

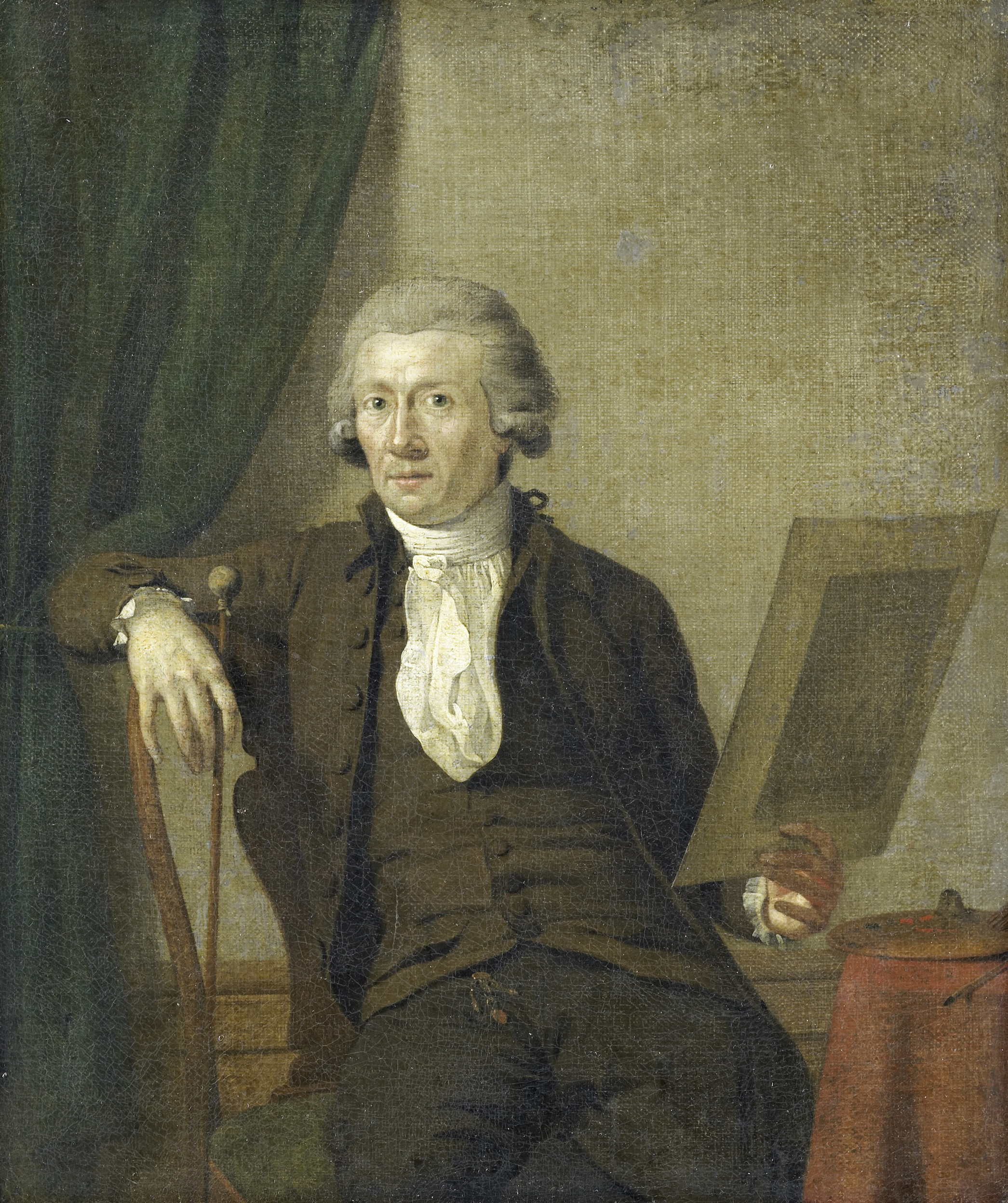
Portrait of Egbert van Drielst by Jan Ekels the Younger

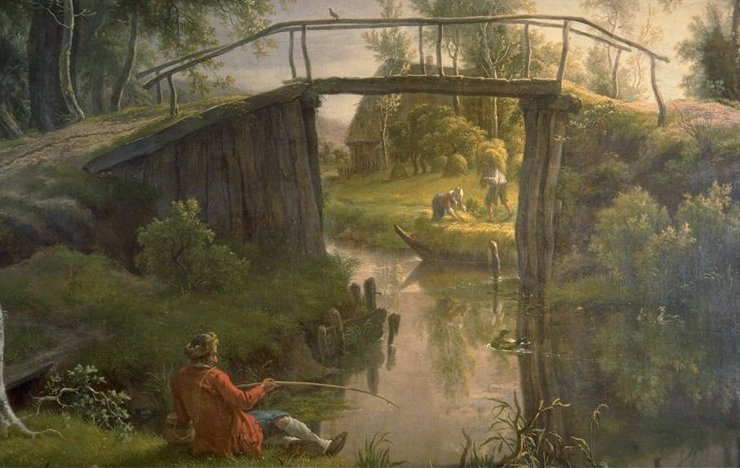
Detail wallpaper by Egbert van Drielst (1788)

Egbert van Drielst (12 March 1745 – 4 June 1818) was a Dutch artist. He began his study of painting in a factory in his native Groningen which produced mainly lacquered objects. He soon went to Haarlem, where he became an apprentice in the wallpaper factory of Jan Augustini. Van Drielst entered the wallpaper studio in Amsterdam where he established friendships with Adriaan de Lelie. He studied the old masters Salomon van Ruysdael, Jacob van Ruisdael, Jan Wijnants and in particular, Meindert Hobbema, and sought to make use of their techniques in his nature studies. In 1768 he became a member of the Guild of Saint Luke in Amsterdam.

He often portrayed nature scenes of the Drenthe, in the north-east of the Netherlands. In 1790 he married a girl from Hoogeveen. Van Drielst traveled there each year to produce drawings, and is sometimes called the "Drentse Hobbema". His wallpaper, usually with the horizon on eye height, can be seen in Elswout, near Haarlem and in the Rijksmuseum Twenthe.

He died in Amsterdam in 1818.

== Sources ==
- Gerlagh, B & E. Koolhaas-Grosfeld (1995) Egbert van Drielst 1745-1818
- Mandle, E.R (1971) Dutch Masterpieces from the eighteenth century. Paintings & Drawings 1700 - 1800
