= Samuel Dickens (priest) =

Samuel Dickens , DD (1719–1791) was Archdeacon of Durham from 1760 until his death.

Prosser was educated at Christ Church, Oxford. He served incumbencies in Colchester, Gateshead and Easington. He was Regius Professor of Greek at Oxford from 1751 until 1763; and Rector of Easington from 1763 until his death on 30 August 1791.
