= Ian Jagger =

British Anglican priest (born 1955)

- Archdeacon of Durham
- Diocese: Diocese of Durham
- In office: 2006–2019 (ret.)
- Predecessor: Stephen Conway
- Other post: Archdeacon of Auckland (2001–2006)

Orders
- Ordination: 1982 (deacon); 1983 (priest) by Mark Santer (deacon); Graham Leonard (priest)

Personal details
- Born: 17 April 1955 (age 71) Yorkshire, United Kingdom
- Denomination: Anglicanism
- Education: Huddersfield New College
- Alma mater: King's College, Cambridge; Cranmer Hall, Durham; St John's College, Durham

Ian Jagger (born 17 April 1955) is a retired British Anglican priest. From 2006 until retirement, he served as the archdeacon of Durham, a senior priest in the Diocese of Durham, Church of England. After parish ministry in the Diocese of London, the Diocese of Oxford, and the Diocese of Portsmouth, he was Archdeacon of Auckland from 2001 to 2006.

== Early life and education ==
Jagger was born on 17 April 1955 in Yorkshire, United Kingdom. He was educated at Huddersfield New College, then an all-boys grammar school in Huddersfield, West Yorkshire. He studied at King's College, Cambridge, and graduated with a Bachelor of Arts (BA) degree in 1977; as per tradition, his BA was promoted to a Master of Arts (MA (Cantab)) degree in 1981.

In 1978, Jagger entered Cranmer Hall, Durham, an Anglican theological in the Open Evangelical tradition, to train for ordained ministry. During this time, he also studied theology at St John's College, Durham, and graduated with a BA degree from the University of Durham in 1980. He left Cranmer Hall in 1982 to be ordained in the Church of England.

== Ordained ministry ==
Jagger was ordained in the Church of England: he was ordained a deacon on Michaelmas Day (29 September 1982) at St Mary's Church, Twickenham (his title church) by Mark Santer, Bishop of Kensington, and ordained a priest at Petertide (26 June) 1983 at St Paul's Cathedral by Graham Leonard, Bishop of London. After a curacy at Twickenham, he was Team Vicar at Willen from 1985 to 1994. He was Team Rector of Fareham from 1994 to 1998, and Rural Dean of Fareham from 1996 to 1998. He was a Canon Residentiary of Portsmouth Cathedral from 1998 to 2001.

In 2001, Jagger moved to the Diocese of Durham to take up the appointment of Archdeacon of Auckland; he was collated to that post on 7 October 2001 at Durham Cathedral. In 2006, he became Archdeacon of Durham; he was collated to that post and installed as a Canon Residentiary on 30 November 2006 at Durham Cathedral. Jagger retired on 17 April 2019.
