= Egbert Baqué =

German gallerist, author and translator

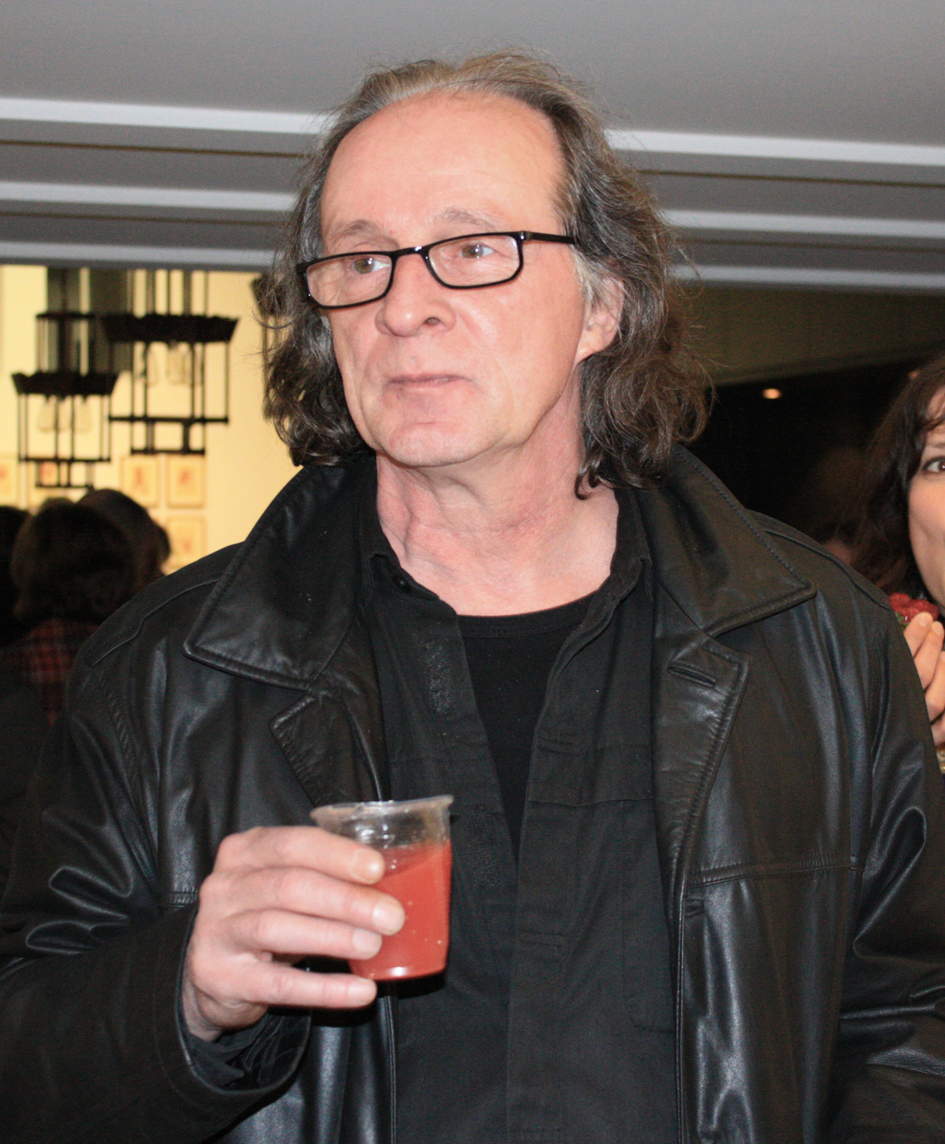
Image of Egbert Baqué

Egbert Baqué (born 1952, in Saarbrücken) is a German gallerist, author and translator.

== Life & Work ==
Egbert Baqué grew up in Saarbrücken and now lives in Berlin, Germany where he studied Sinology. In the beginning of the 1990s he worked as a freelance author, translator, curator, and as a project manager in the field of international cultural exchange responsible for museum exhibits.

He founded his first gallery in 1991. From 1997 to 2005, he worked as the correspondent for a gallery in Paris, and in this capacity he prepared exhibitions with artists such as Georg Baselitz, Markus Lüpertz, Helmut Middendorf, Norbert Bisky and Markus Oehlen. Since 2001 he has been active translating books and catalogue articles about Pablo Picasso, Henri Matisse, Gustave Courbet, Yves Klein, Bettina Rheims, Jannis Kounellis, John Chamberlain and Louise Bourgeois among others. In 2011, Egbert Baqué was nominated for the Deutscher Jugendliteraturpreis as the translator for the book Der Junge, der Picasso biss (The boy who bit Picasso) by Antony Penrose.

== Egbert Baqué Contemporary Art Berlin ==
In autumn 2005, he founded his new gallery in Berlin, Egbert Baqué Contemporary Art, which primarily exhibits painting and photography. The artists of the gallery include: Abetz & Drescher, Pia Arnström, Wiebke Bartsch, Walter Bortolossi, Selket Chlupka, Claus Feldmann, Bettina van Haaren, Yago Hortal, Ivar Kaasik, Volker Lehnert, Wolfgang Neumann, Tim Plamper, Thibaut de Reimpré, Fernando M. Romero, and Franziska Strauss.

== Literature (selection) ==
=== Books ===
- The Archive for Research in Archetypal Symbolism. The Book of Symbols. German translation from English by Egbert Baqué. Taschen, Cologne, 2011. ISBN 978-3-8365-2572-5
- Assholes Finish First by Tucker Max. German translation from English by Egbert Baqué. riva Press, Munich 2011. ISBN 978-3-86883-124-5
- Mon American Dream. Des Citès d`Avignon à la Citè des Anges by Christian Audigier. German translation from French by Egbert Baqué. riva Press, Munich, 2010. ISBN 978-3-86883-051-4
- The boy who bit Picasso by Antony Penrose. German translation from English by Egbert Baqué. Knesebeck Press, Munich, 2010. ISBN 978-3-86873-260-3.
- Kate Moss by Mario Testino. German translation from English by Egbert Baqué. Taschen, Cologne 2010. ISBN 978-3-8365-2506-0
- In the President's Secret Service. by Ronald Kessler. German translation from English by Egbert Baqué. riva Press, Munich, 2010. ISBN 978-3-86883-058-3
- Henri Matisse – Cut outs. Drawing with Scissors by Gilles Néret / Xavier-Gilles Néret. German translation from French by Egbert Baqué. Taschen, Cologne, 2009. ISBN 978-3-8228-5196-8
- Japanese Cinema by Stuart Galbraith IV. / Paul Duncan (Hg.) German translation from English by Egbert Baqué. Taschen, Cologne, 2009. ISBN 978-3-8228-3157-1
- Egbert Baqué (Editor): “China”. Hamburg, 1987. ISBN 978-3-922294-96-2.
- The New Erotic Photography. By Dian Hanson / Eric Kroll. German translation by Egbert Baqué, Taschen, Cologne 2007. ISBN 978-3-8228-4924-8.
- CINEMA NOW by Andrew Bailey. German translation from English by Egbert Baqué. Taschen, Cologne, 2007. ISBN 978-3-8228-5636-9
- Jean Renoir by Christopher Faulkner. German translation from English by Egbert Baqué, Taschen, Cologne, 2007. ISBN 978-3-8228-3094-9
- Gustave Courbet by Fabrice Masanès. German translation from French by Egbert Baqué. Taschen, Cologne, 2006. ISBN 978-3-8228-5680-2
- Egbert Baqué (Editor): “Paris”. Hamburg, 1988. ISBN 3-89234-046-3

=== Article for the German weekly Die Zeit ===
- Doppelmord, Ein Sammelband moderner chinesischer Lyrik, Die Zeit, Nr. 27 - 28. June 1985
- Wassertelegramme, Der chinesische Schriftsteller Guo Moruo und seine Autobiographie, Die Zeit, Nr. 13 - 21. March 1986
- Engel der Einsamkeit - Der argentinische **Schriftsteller Ernesto Sábato, Die Zeit, Nr. 26 - 20. June 1986
- Den Roman leben, das Leben schreiben, Über Gérard de Nerval. Die Zeit, Nr. 46 - 7. November 1986 ISBN 3-89234-046-3
- Mohamed Choukri: "Das nackte Brot" Die Zeit, Nr. 14 - 27. March 1987
- Jean Giono, wiederentdeckt Die Zeit, Nr. 42, 13. October 1989
