= Egbert Lucas =

Egbert de Grey Lucas was the Archdeacon of Durham from 1939 to 1953.

Born on the Isle of Wight on 25 September 1878, he was educated at Winchester College and Christ Church, Oxford. Ordained in 1903 his first post was as a curate at St Anne's, Wandsworth after which he was Chaplain at Hertford College, Oxford. He was with the Winchester College Mission from 1908 to 1924. He then held incumbencies in Lavender Hill and Guildford before his archdeacon’s appointment.

He died on 25 May 1958.
