= Elswout =

Coordinates: 52°22′41.13″N 4°35′56.9″E

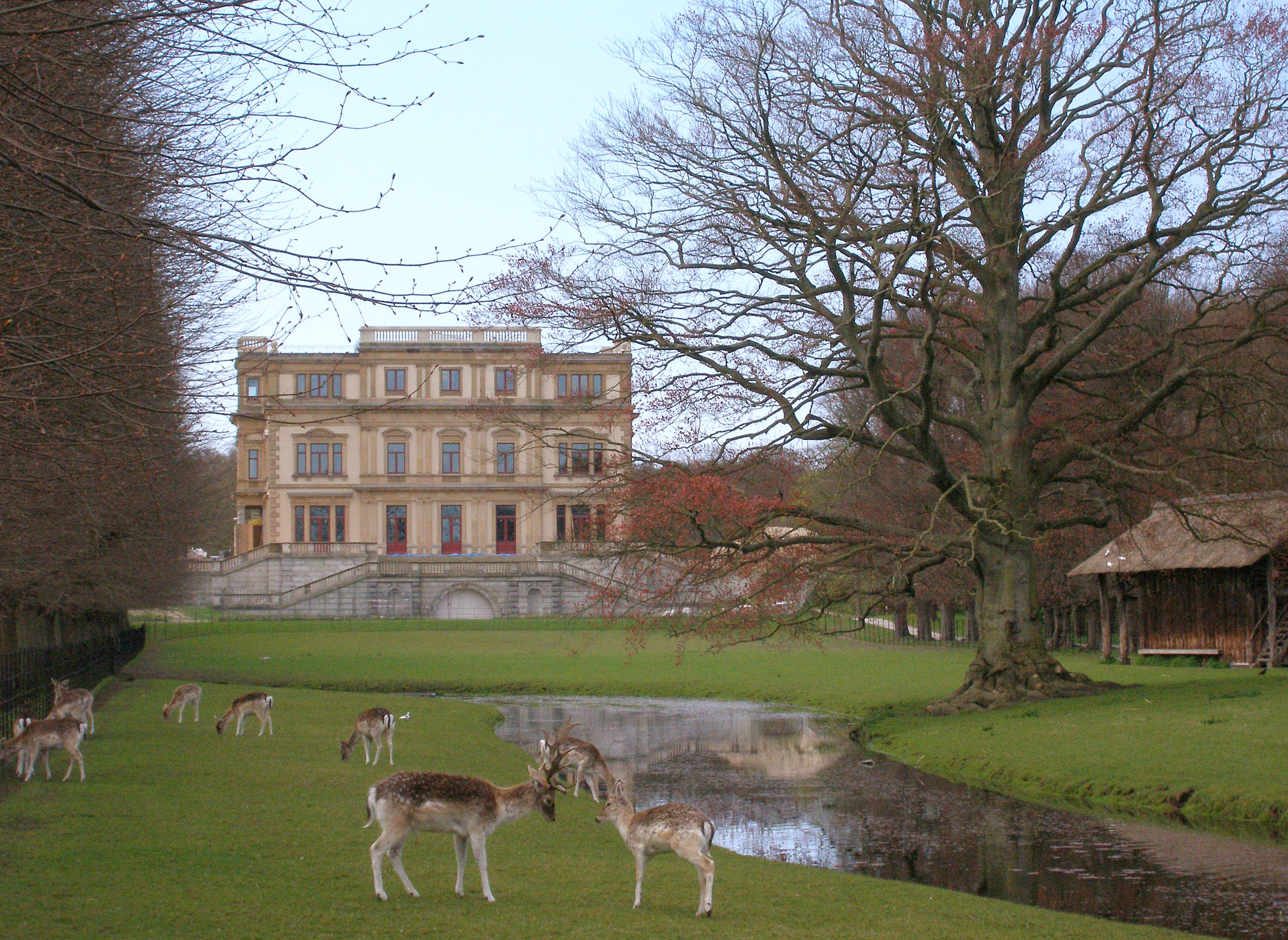
The main building of Elswout, seen from the deer enclosure

Elswout is a historical buitenplaats (summer residence) dating from the 19th century in a park by the same name in Overveen, Netherlands.

== History ==
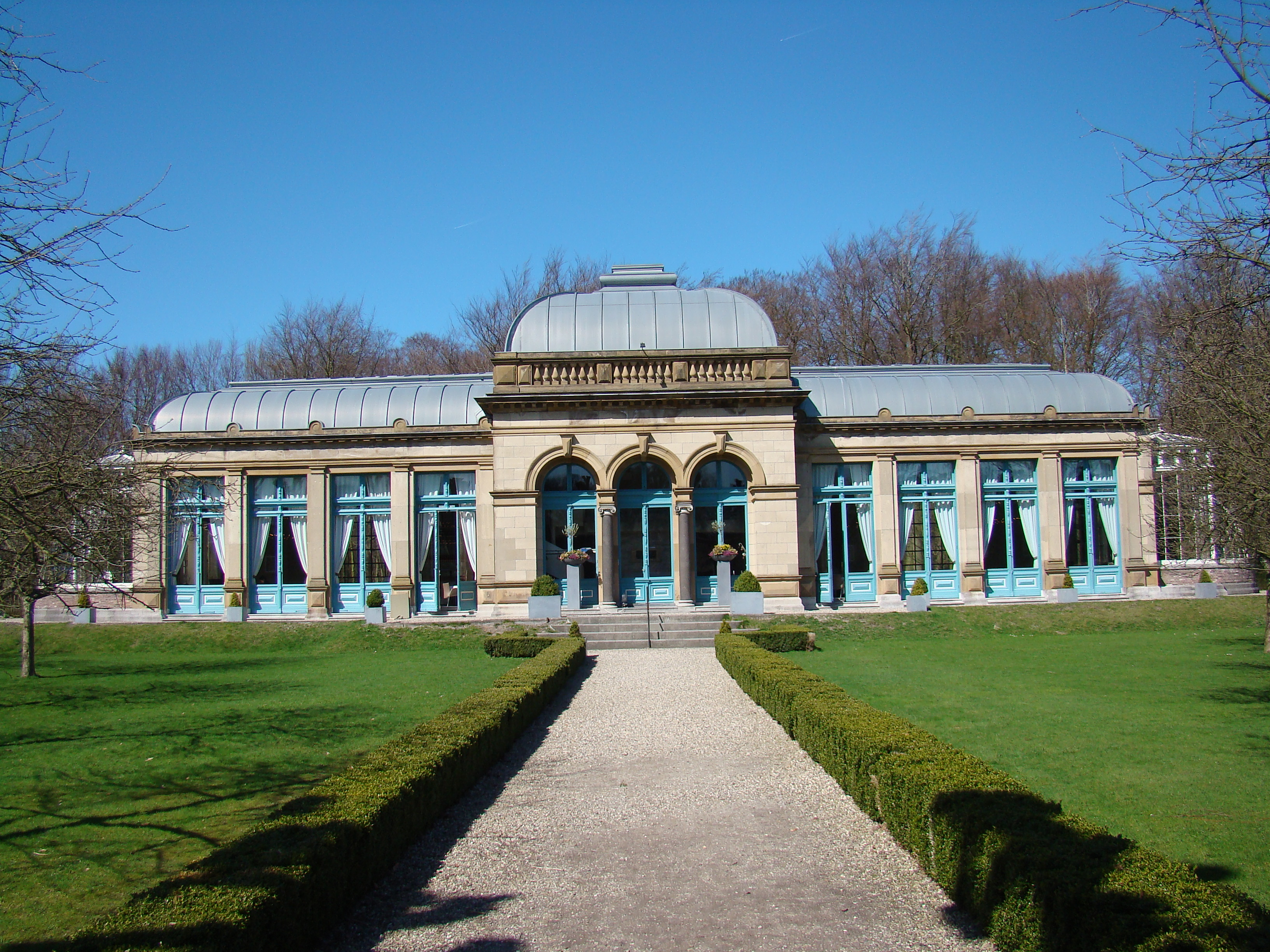
Orangerie

The Elswout site was a buitenplaats for a long time before the current construction began. The original house (of which the structural wall's are incorporated in the current 19th century house) was built by a merchant dealing with Russia, called Carl du Moulin in circa 1633–1635. The design is attributed to Jacob van Campen and Pieter Post. After Du Moulin went bankrupt the estate was sold in 1654 to Gabriel Marselis, an Amsterdam arms merchant for the King of Denmark, who called the estate 'Elswout' (meaning: Alderwood). Like Du Moulin, he used it as a summer home while selling the sand to be shipped by boat to Amsterdam for construction. In the Frans Hals Museum 17th-century depictions of Elswout by Gerrit Berckheyde and Jan van der Heyden are on display.

By removing the sand in the dunes on his property, Gabriel Marselis was able to lay out a garden in the French style while financing this from the profits on the sand. Though the still existing "sand vaart" canal was originally constructed for Carl du Moulin, it is called the Marcelisvaart today after the rules that Marcelis drew up for the diggers and boatsmen on his property. Removing sand from the property was only halted in 1948 when the level of the garden was considered dangerously low by the water board.

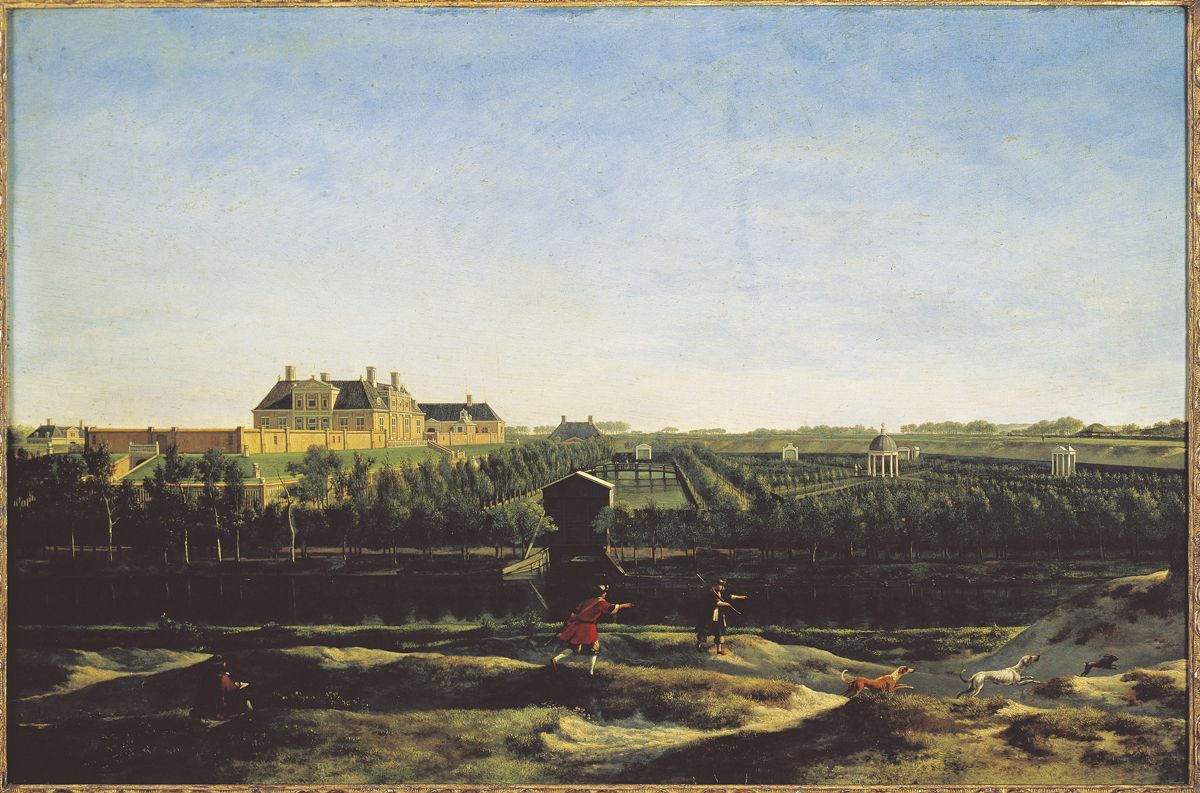
Elswout by Gerrit Berckheyde

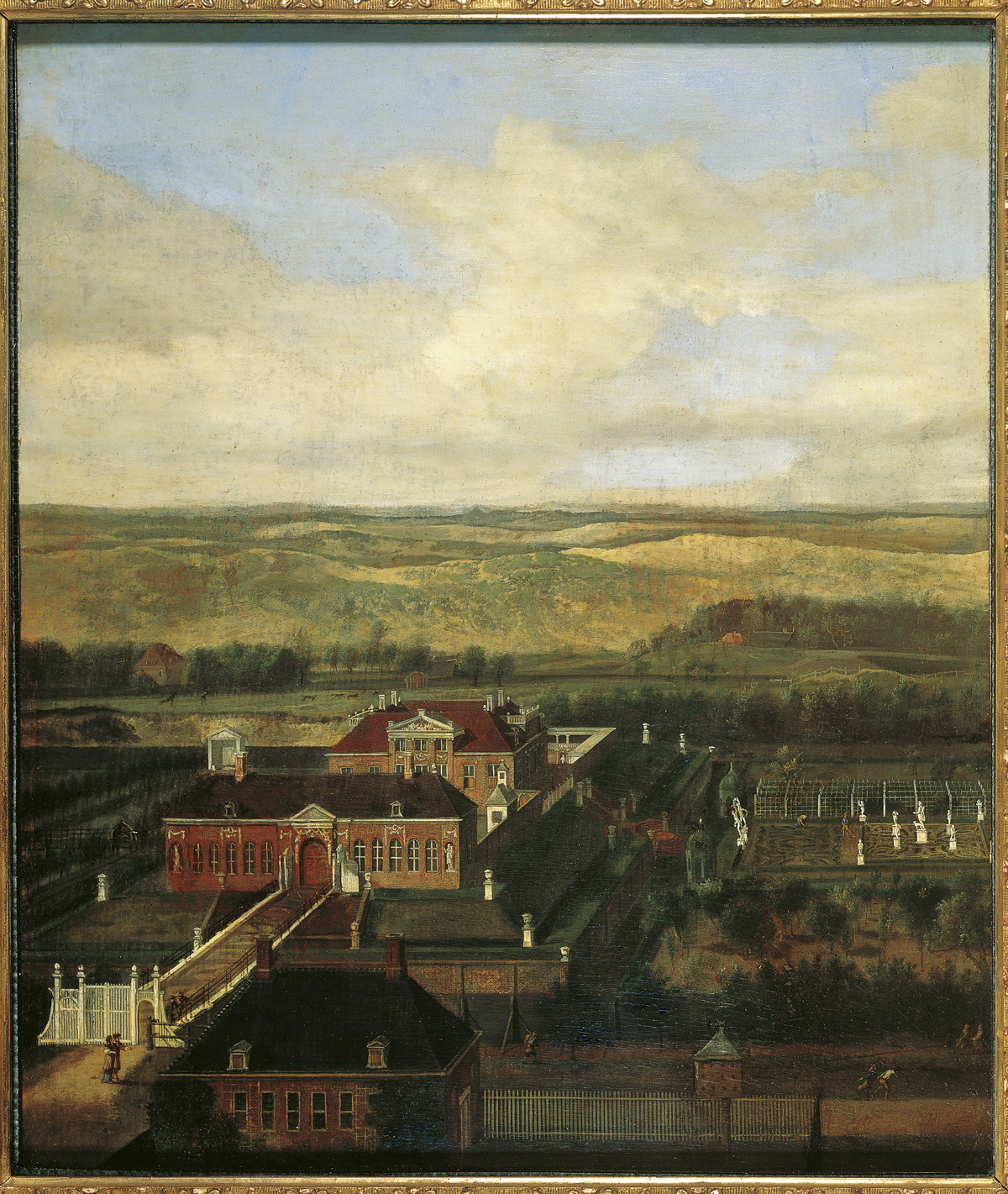
Elswout by Jan van der Heyden

In the years 1781-1794 the garden was redesigned in the English Landscape style by Mr. Jacob Boreel. During a short period afterwards Elswout was for rent, attracting Haarlem artists, who took their sketch books with them into the gardens. One of those artists was Egbert van Drielst. In 1805 the neglected estate was bought by the broker Willem Borski, who had close business relations with the Barings Bank and Hope & Co. After his death his widow Johanna Borski became not only the owner of Elswout, but also one of the most important bankers in Dutch history for co-founding and rescuing De Nederlandsche Bank in its early years. The main building seen today was designed in Italian high renaissance style in 1883 by C Muysken for her grandson, the rich banker Willem Borski III, but construction was stopped in 1884 when Borski died childless, and the house was never completed, remaining a folly until World War II when the German occupying forces put a provisional roof on the building for use as a garrison.

The park surrounding the main house contains various follies that are also protected in the heritage register, as are the gatekeeper's entrance, the orangerie, and the stables. Today there are plans to restore the building according to the original plans.

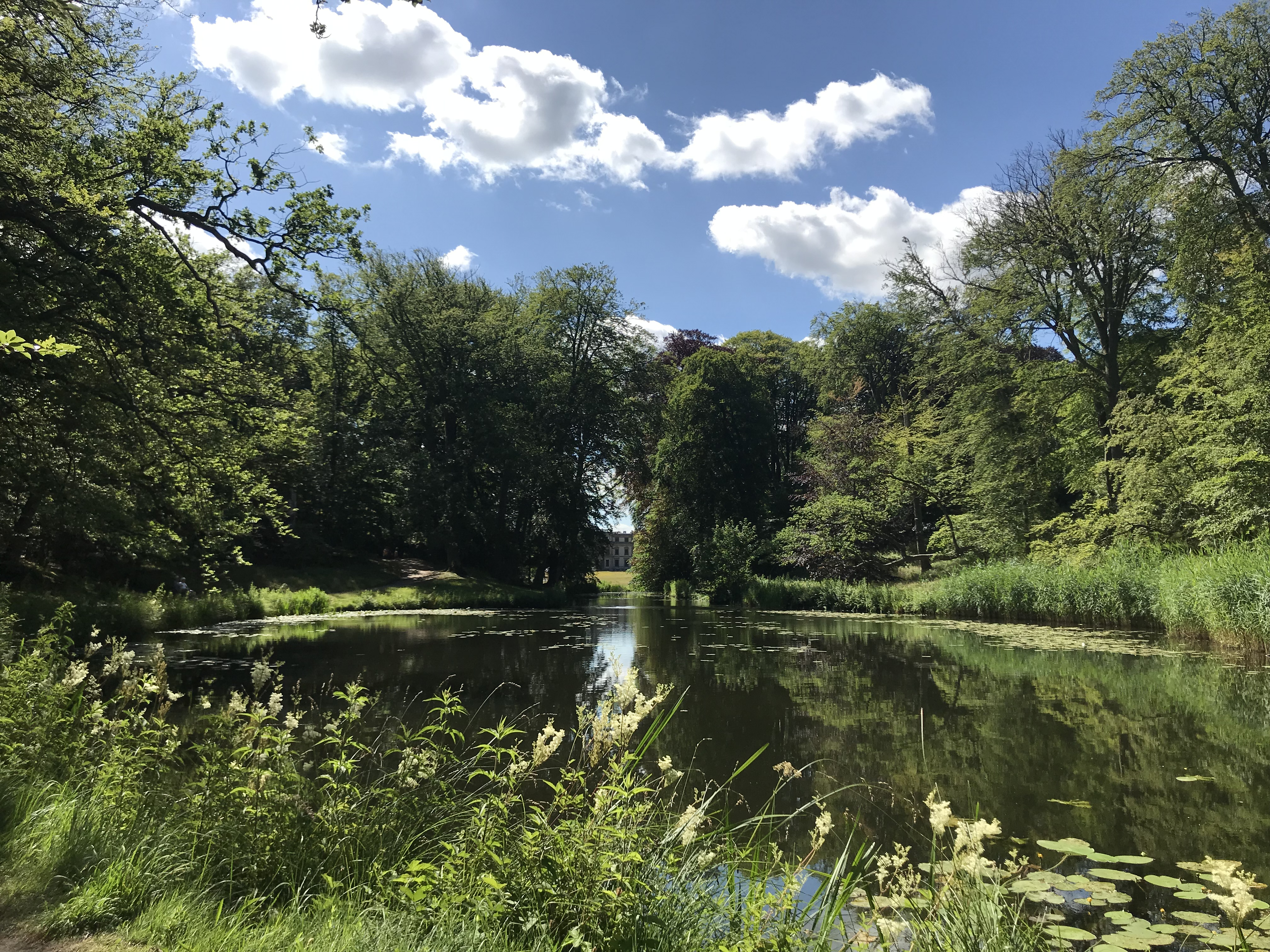
duck pond

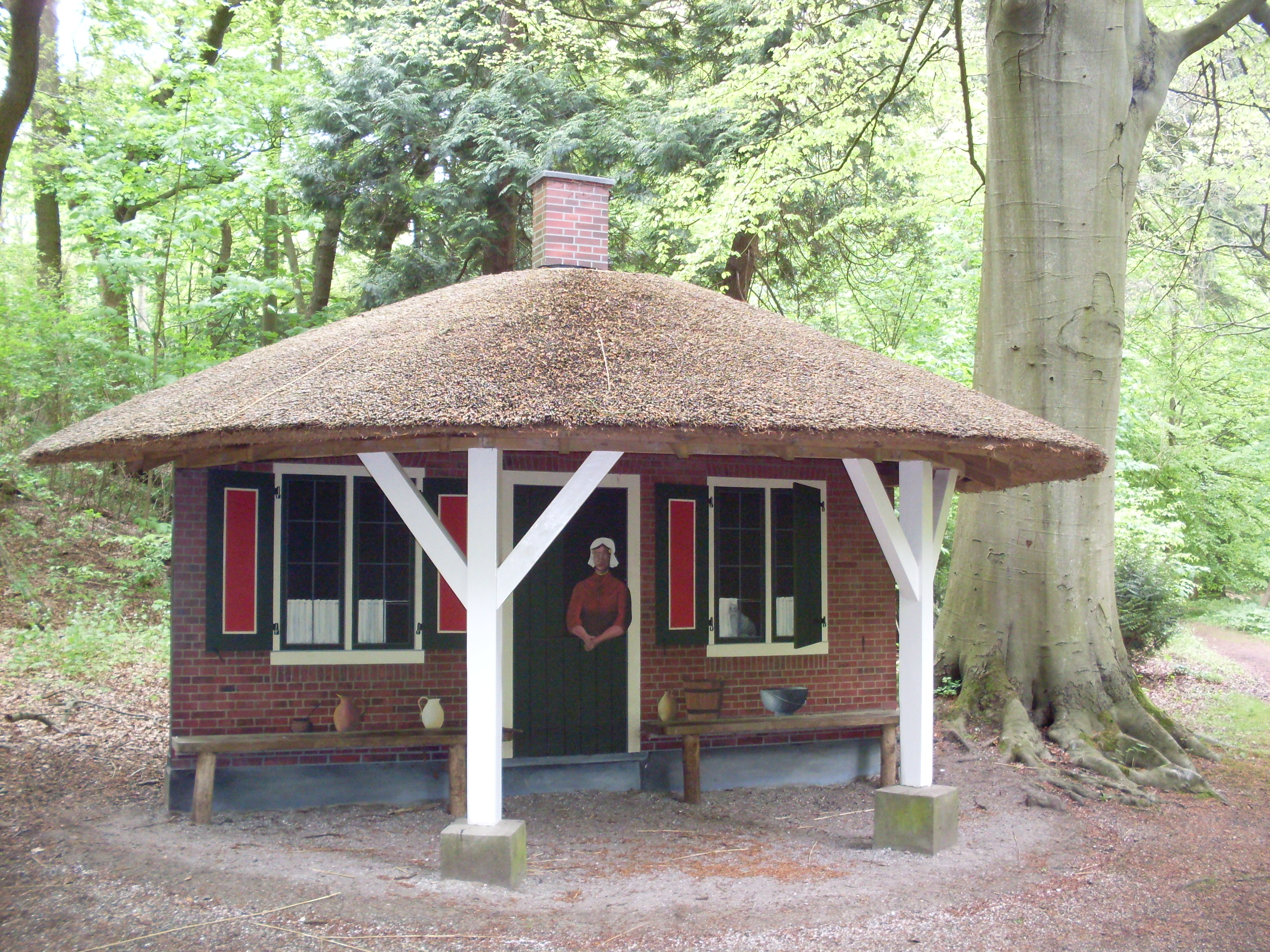
folly

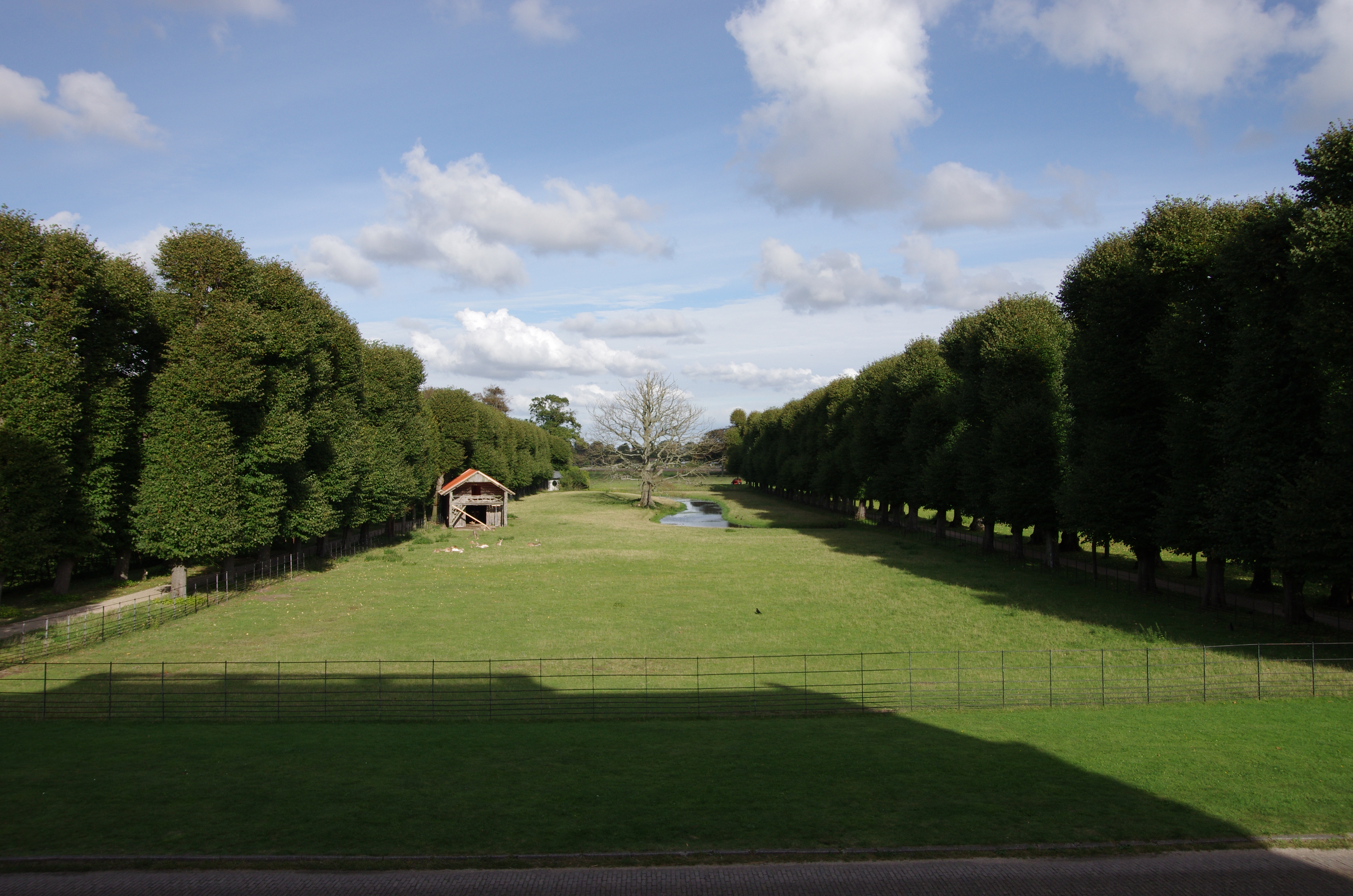
deer enclosure

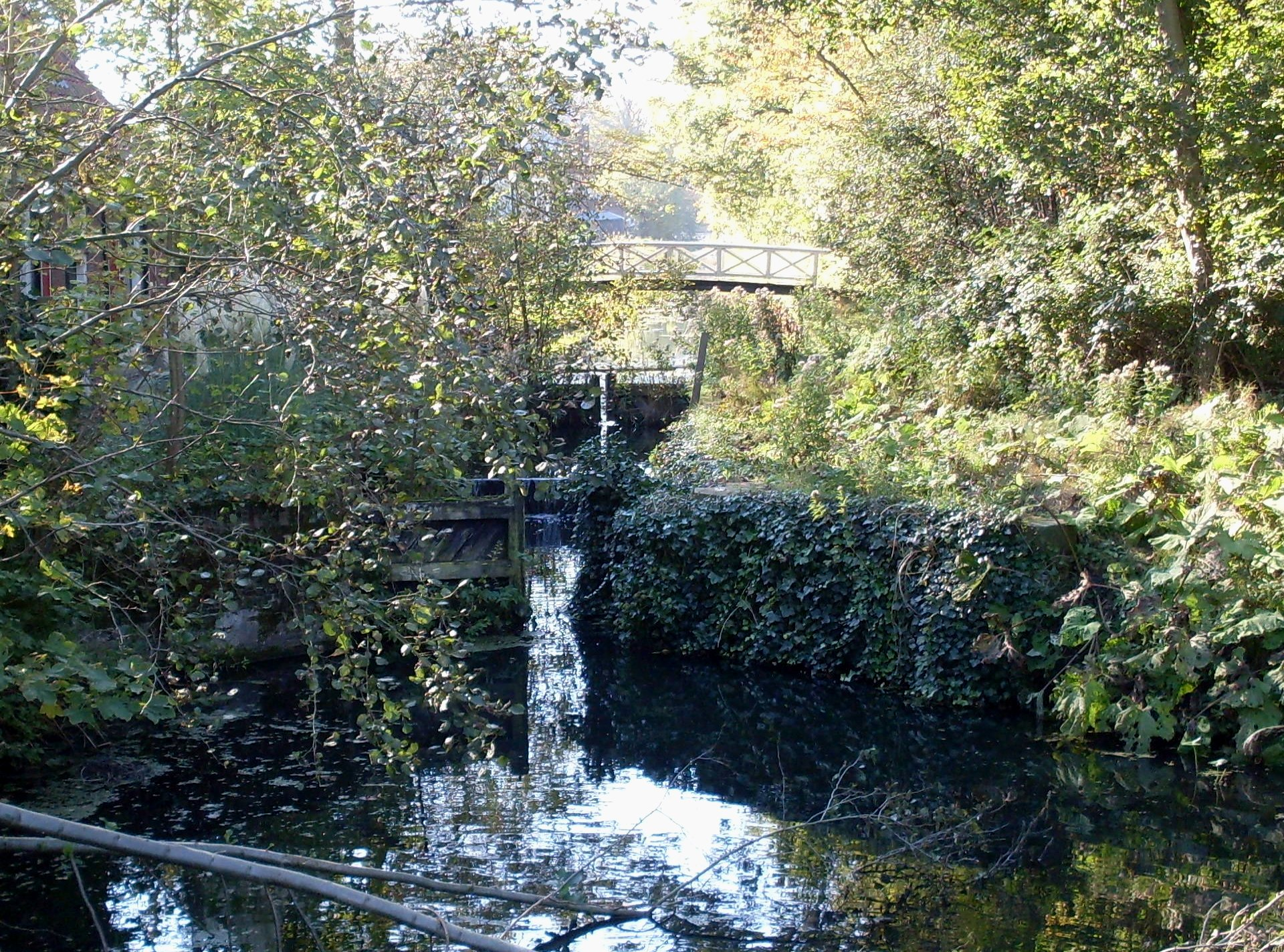
sluice

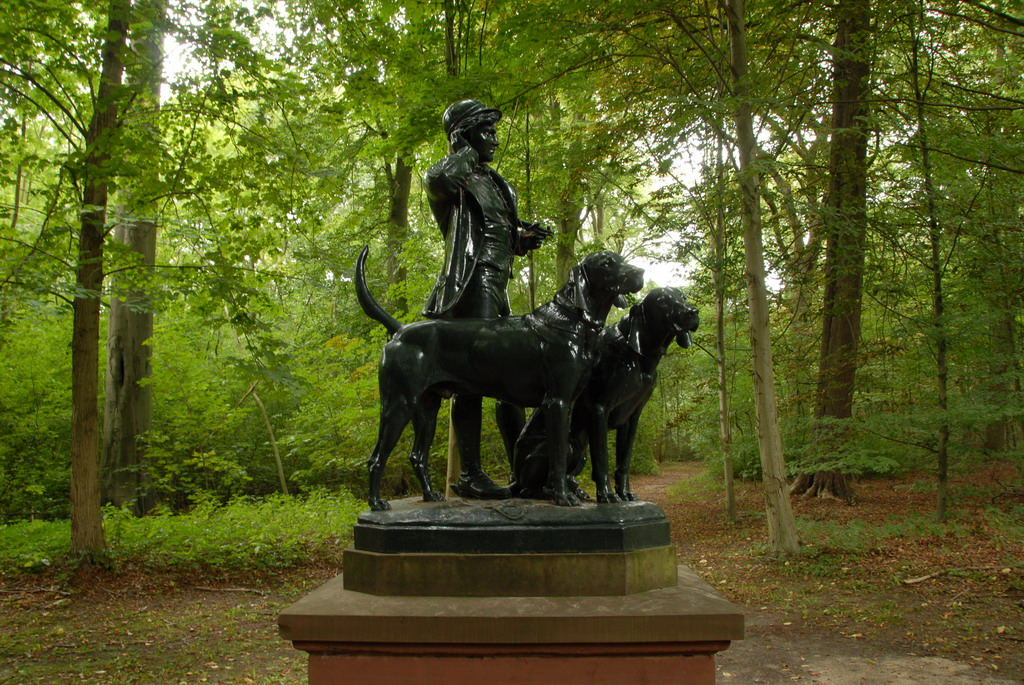
“Valet au chiens”, by Henri Alfred Marie Jacquemart (1824–1896)

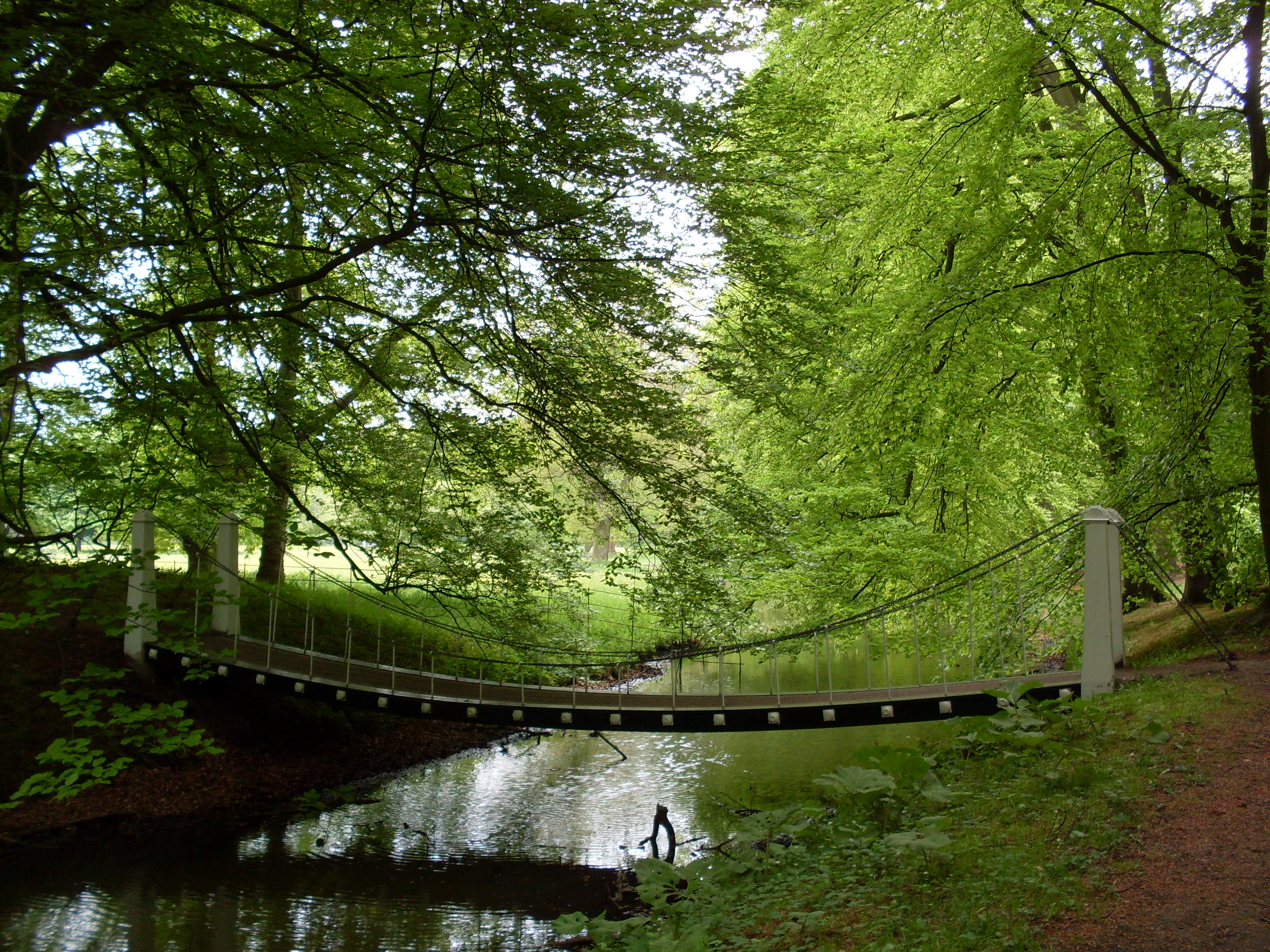
chain bridge

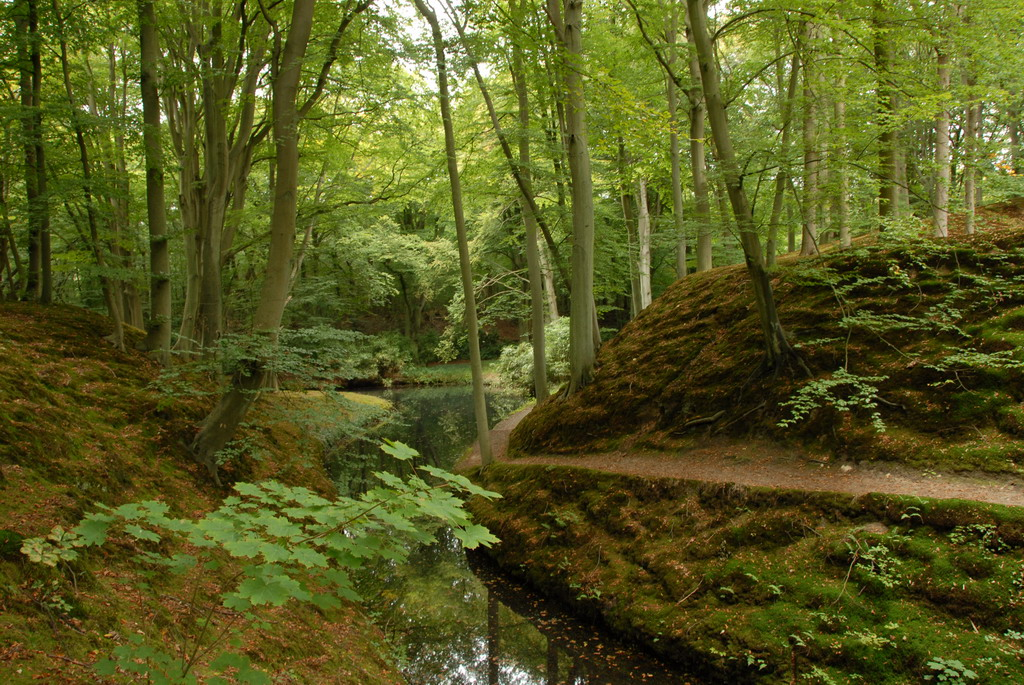
canal in the park

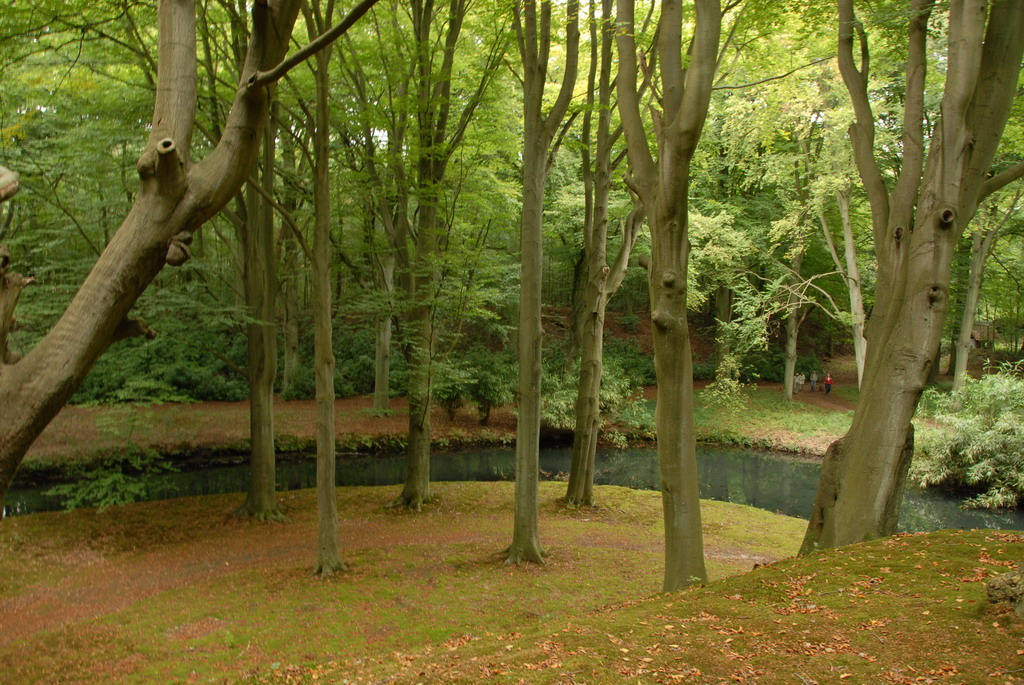
canal in the park (other side)

Today the park is open to the public and the Orangerie has a restaurant that can be rented for weddings and other events.
