= Gilbert de Biham =

English churchman, singer and university chancellor

Gilbert de Biham was an English medieval churchman, singer, and university chancellor.

Gilbert de Biham was a chantor and Canon of Wells Cathedral. Between 1246 and 1252, he was Chancellor of Oxford University.

Academic offices
Preceded by Simon de Bovill	Chancellor of the University of Oxford; 1246–1252	Succeeded by Ralph de Sempringham
