= James Chidester Egbert Jr. =

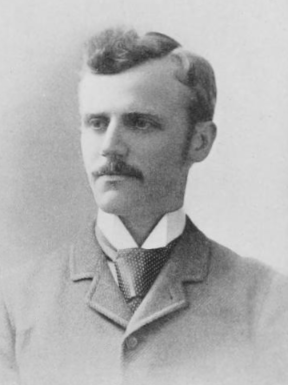
- Born: May 3, 1859; New York, New York, US
- Died: July 17, 1948 (aged 89); New York, New York, US
- Education: Columbia University
- Occupation: Academic
- Spouse: Emma Gross Pennington (m. 1884)
- Children: 3

James Chidester Egbert Jr., Ph. D. (1859–1948) was an American classical scholar and educator.

== Biography ==
James Chidester Egbert Jr. was born in New York City on May 3, 1859. He graduated at Columbia University in 1881, and took a doctorate there in 1884. He then became a professor of classical studies and was dean of the School of Business there from 1916 to 1932. In 1911, he became active in the American Academy in Rome, serving on various committees and becoming vice president from 1940-1944.

Egbert served as President of the Archaeological Institute of America from 1918 to 1921.

His works include an edition of Macmillan's Shorter Latin Course (1892); Cicero de Senectute (1895); Introduction to the Study of Latin Inscriptions (1896); and Livy xxi and Selections from xxii to xxx (1913). He also wrote a four-volume work American Business Practice (1931).

He married Emma Gross Pennington in 1884, and they had three children.

He died at St. Luke's Hospital in Manhattan on July 17, 1948.
