= Archdeacon of Durham =

Church of England ecclesiastical office

The Archdeacon of Durham is a senior ecclesiastical officer of the diocese of Durham (Church of England). They have, within the geographical area of the archdeaconry of Durham, pastoral oversight of clergy and care of church buildings (among other responsibilities).

== History ==
The first archdeacons in the diocese were appointed after the Norman Conquest – around the same time the post of Archdeacon first appeared elsewhere in England. There is no evidence of more than one archdeacon in the diocese until the mid-12th century, when two lines of office holders start to appear in sources. The titles "Archdeacon of Durham" and "Archdeacon of Northumberland" are not recorded until later in the century, although it is possible to discern which of the two lines became which post.

The archdeaconry has been split twice: once on 23 May 1882, to create the Auckland archdeaconry after the Diocese of Newcastle was created from the diocese's other two archdeaconries and a second time in 1997, to create the Sunderland archdeaconry.

== List of archdeacons ==
=== High Medieval ===
Sole archdeacons

- bef. 1080–bef. 1083: Leobwine
- aft. 1083–bef. 1093: Thurstan
- 11 August 1093–c. 1108 (res.): Turgot of Durham
- bef. 1116–bef. 1128: Michael

Senior archdeacons

- aft. 1122–bef. 1144 (dep.): Robert
- bef. 1147–aft. 1155: Wazo
- bef. 1158–bef. 1172: Vacant
- bef. 1172–6 December 1196 (d.): Burchard du Puiset
- bef. 1197–aft. 1217: Aimeric (also Archdeacon of Carlisle until aft. 1208)
- aft. 1217–bef. 1225 (d.): Simon de Ferlington
- bef. 1224–bef. 1244 (d.): William of Laneham

Archdeacons of Durham

- bef. 1255–1255 (d.): Robert de Cortuna
- bef. 1257–aft. 1272: Robert de Sancta Agatha
- bef. 1275–aft. 1283 (res.): Antony Bek
- bef. 1284–1290 (res.): William of Louth
- bef. 1297–aft. 1309: William de St Botulph

=== Late Medieval ===
- bef. 1331–bef. 1331 (d.): Thomas de Goldesburgh
- aft. 1331–bef. 1333 (d.): Amaury de Beaumont
- 3 January 1334–bef. 1334 (res.): Robert de Taunton
- 31 March 1334–bef. 1361 (d.): Thomas de Neville
- 15 August 1362–bef. 1369 (d.): William de Westle
- 18 August 1369–bef. 1369 (res.): John de Kyngeston
- 6 November 1369–?: John de Stokes
- bef. 1371–1373 (res.): Alexander Neville
- bef. 1378–13 August 1379 (d.): Giacomo Cardinal Orsini, Dean of Salisbury (cardinal-deacon of San Giorgio in Velabro)
- bef. 1380–3 October 1380 (d.): Agapitus Cardinal de Colonna (cardinal-priest of Santa Prisca)
- 9 May 1381–bef. 1387 (deprived): Pileus Cardinal de Prata (cardinal-priest of Santa Prassede)

Period of dispute:

- Pope's claimants
  - 11 August 1387 – 8 August 1394 (d.): Marius Cardinal Bulcano (cardinal-deacon of Santa Maria Nova; judged proper archdeacon in 1393)
- King's/Bishop's claimants
  - bef. 1387–bef. 1388: John Maundour
  - 18 April 1388 – 1393 (d.): Hugh Herle
  - 1393–bef. 1408 (d.): Thomas de Weston (unopposed after 1394)
- 8 October 1408 – 15 February 1409 (res.): Alan de Newark
- 16 February 1409 – 1417 (d.): John Hovyngham
- 13 October 1417 – 1419 (res.): John Kemp
- bef. 1419: Gabriel Cardinal Condulmier (cardinal-priest of San Clemente; grant ineffective)
- 24 March 1419 – 1 August 1425 (res.): Robert Gilbert
- 14 August 1425–aft. 1440: Robert Rolleston
- bef. 1448–aft. 1448: William Scrope
- bef. 1452–1456 (res.): George Neville
- aft. 1456–bef. 1466: Thomas Rotherham
- aft. 1466–1497 (d.): Ralph Booth
- 20 April 1497–bef. 1500 (res.): Thomas Colston
- 20 January 1500 – 1503 (res.): Roger Leyburn
- bef. 1515–January 1556 (d.): William Franklyn (also Dean of Windsor, 1536–1553)

=== Early modern ===
- bef. 1559–bef. 1560 (res.): Bernard Gilpin
- 22 May 1560–bef. 1563 (res.): John Ebden
- 5 December 1563–aft. 1602: John Pilkington
- 19 November 1603–bef. 1620 (d.): William Morton
- 9 September 1620 – 10 May 1662 (d.): Gabriel Clark
- 19 September 1662 – 1 February 1690 (deprived): Denis Granville (also Dean of Durham from 1684; non-juror)
- 15 May 1691–bef. 1730 (d.): The Hon Robert Booth
- 9 October 1730 – 25 July 1761 (d.): George Sayer
- 2 January 1762 – 23 August 1791 (d.): Samuel Dickens
- 10 September 1791 – 26 March 1808 (d.): Benjamin Pye
- 16 April 1808 – 2 December 1831 (res.): Richard Prosser
- 6 December 1831 – 10 October 1862 (d.): Charles Thorp

=== Late modern ===
- 1863–26 October 1882 (d.): Edward Prest
- 1882–31 August 1922 (d.): Henry Watkins
- 1922–26 April 1924 (d.): John Quirk, Bishop suffragan of Jarrow
- 1924–9 May 1932 (d.): Samuel Knight, Bishop suffragan of Jarrow
- 1932–28 August 1938 (d.): James Gordon, Bishop suffragan of Jarrow
- 1939–1953 (ret.) Egbert Lucas
- 1953–1969 (ret.): John Cobham (afterwards archdeacon emeritus)
- 1970–1993 (res.): Michael Perry
- 1993–1997 (ret.): Derek Hodgson (afterwards archdeacon emeritus)
- 1997–2002 (res.): Trevor Willmott
- 2002–2006 (res.): Stephen Conway
- 2006 – 17 April 2019 (ret.): Ian Jagger
- "late summer" 2020 onwards: Libby Wilkinson (announced)

== Sources ==
- Greenway, Diana E. (1971), Fasti Ecclesiae Anglicanae 1066–1300, vol. 2, pp. 37–39
- Jones, B. (1963), Fasti Ecclesiae Anglicanae 1300–1541, vol. 6, pp. 111–113
- Horn, Joyce M.; Mussett, Patrick; Smith, David M. (2004), Fasti Ecclesiae Anglicanae 1541–1857, vol. 11, pp. 82–83
