= Guildford Cathedral =

Coordinates: 51°14′28″N 0°35′24″W

- Cathedral Church of the Holy Spirit
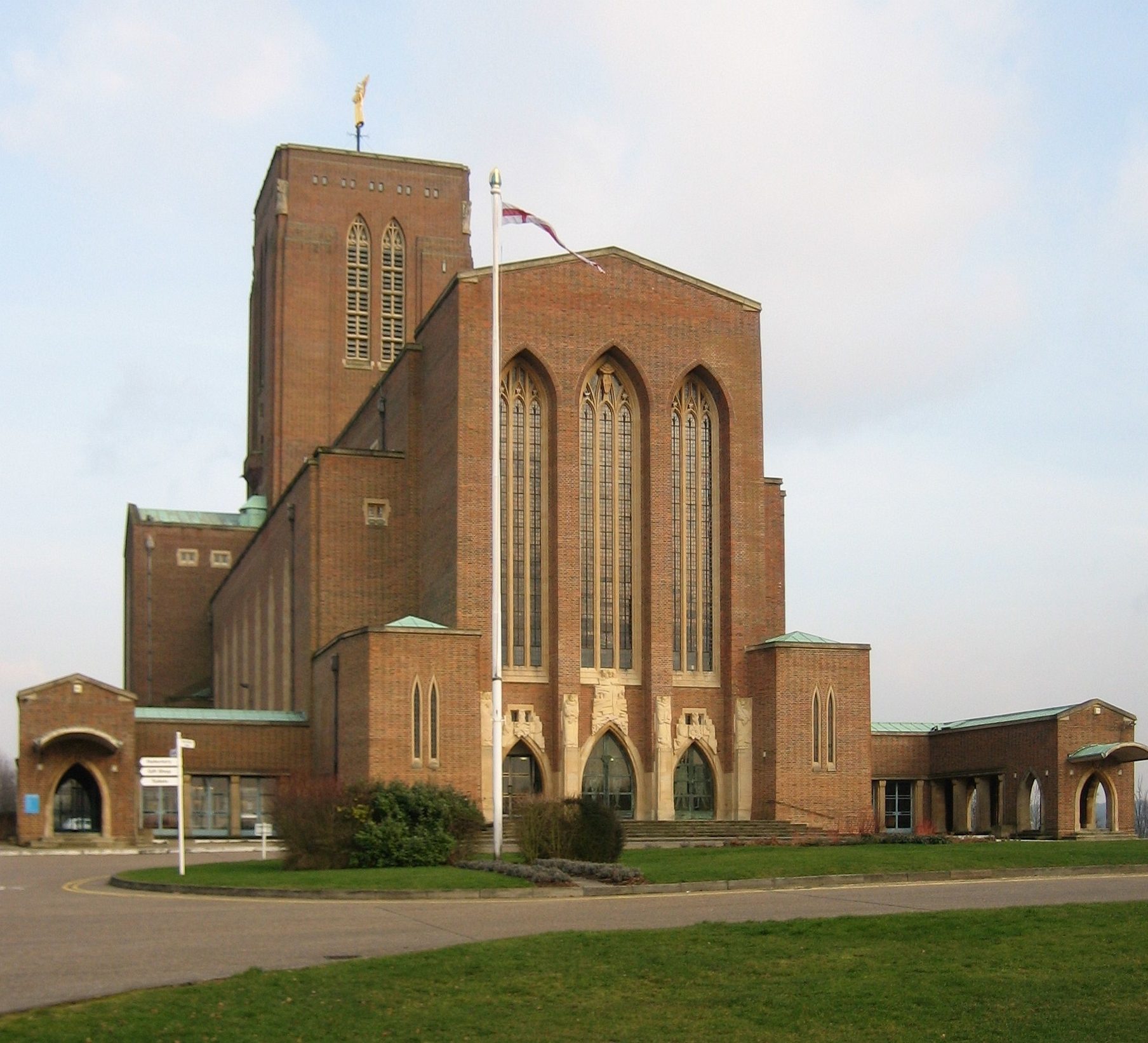

- Location in Surrey
- OS grid reference: SU 98538 50044
- Location: Guildford, Surrey
- Country: England
- Denomination: Church of England
- Website: guildford-cathedral.org

History
- Status: Cathedral
- Consecrated: 1961

Architecture
- Functional status: Active
- Heritage designation: Grade II* listed
- Designated: 1981
- Architect: Edward Maufe
- Style: Neo-Gothic/Art Deco
- Years built: 1936–1961

Administration
- Province: Canterbury
- Diocese: Guildford

Clergy
- Dean: Bob Cooper
- Priest(s): Mavis Wilson, Duncan Myers

The Cathedral Church of the Holy Spirit, Guildford, commonly known as Guildford Cathedral, is the Anglican cathedral in Guildford, Surrey, England. Richard Onslow, 5th Earl of Onslow donated the first 6 acres (2.4 ha) of land on which the cathedral stands, with Viscount Bennett, a former Prime Minister of Canada, purchasing the remaining land and donating it to the cathedral in 1947. Designed by Edward Maufe and built between 1936 and 1961, it is the seat of the Bishop of Guildford. The cathedral was listed as Grade II* by Historic England in 1981. It was the last Church of England cathedral to be consecrated on a new site, and one of only three to be built in the 20th century, the others being Liverpool and Coventry Cathedral.

== Construction ==
The Diocese of Guildford was created in 1927, covering most of Surrey. Guildford's restored Georgian Holy Trinity Church served as pro-cathedral, but was considered too small to become the cathedral.

In 1932, a design competition was held, with a brief that the construction costs should be £250,000. 183 architects took part, from whom the Cathedral Committee chose Edward Maufe (later Sir Edward Maufe) as its architect.

In 1933, Richard Onslow donated land at the top of Stag Hill as a site for the cathedral.

The foundation stone was laid by Cosmo Lang, Archbishop of Canterbury, in 1936, but work was suspended in 1939 due to the Second World War.

In 1947, Viscount Bennett, former prime minister of Canada, bought the land surrounding Stag Hill, as a memorial to Canadian soldiers who were billeted in the area during the Second World War.

In 1948, work recommenced on building new roofs and the base of the tower, but post-war building restrictions meant that building was not able to fully resume until 1952, after the appointment of Walter Boulton as Provost. At that point, it was already clear that £250,000 originally raised to build the cathedral was hopelessly inadequate. The Cathedral Committee, and its formidable secretary, Miss Eleanora Iredale, launched the 'Buy-a Brick' campaign in 1952. Between 1952 and 1961 more than 200,000 people paid 2s 6d (equivalent to £3 in 2025) to sign their name, or the name of another person on a brick. Elizabeth II and Prince Philip both signed bricks, which are on display inside the cathedral.

The building was consecrated in the presence of Queen Elizabeth II and Prince Philip on 17 May 1961. The building was finally completed in 1965.

== Location ==
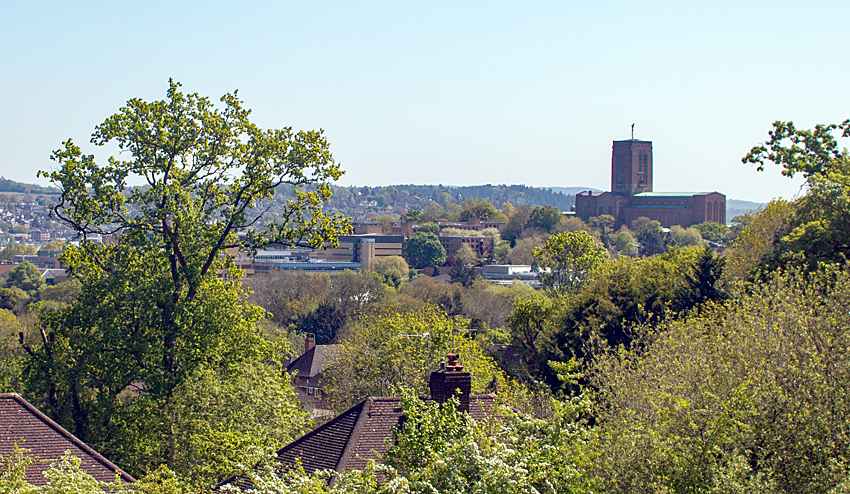
Guildford Cathedral and the University of Surrey

Where to put the cathedral for the new diocese of Guildford was a vexing question until Richard, Lord Onslow donated 6 acres (2.4 ha) atop Stag Hill — so named because the Kings of England used to hunt there. Its solid red brick outline is visible for miles around. Whilst in 1932 this was far outside the town of Guildford, the growth since then has already begun to wrap around the cathedral to the west and south. Guildford Cathedral shares Stag Hill with the main campus of the University of Surrey.

== Description ==
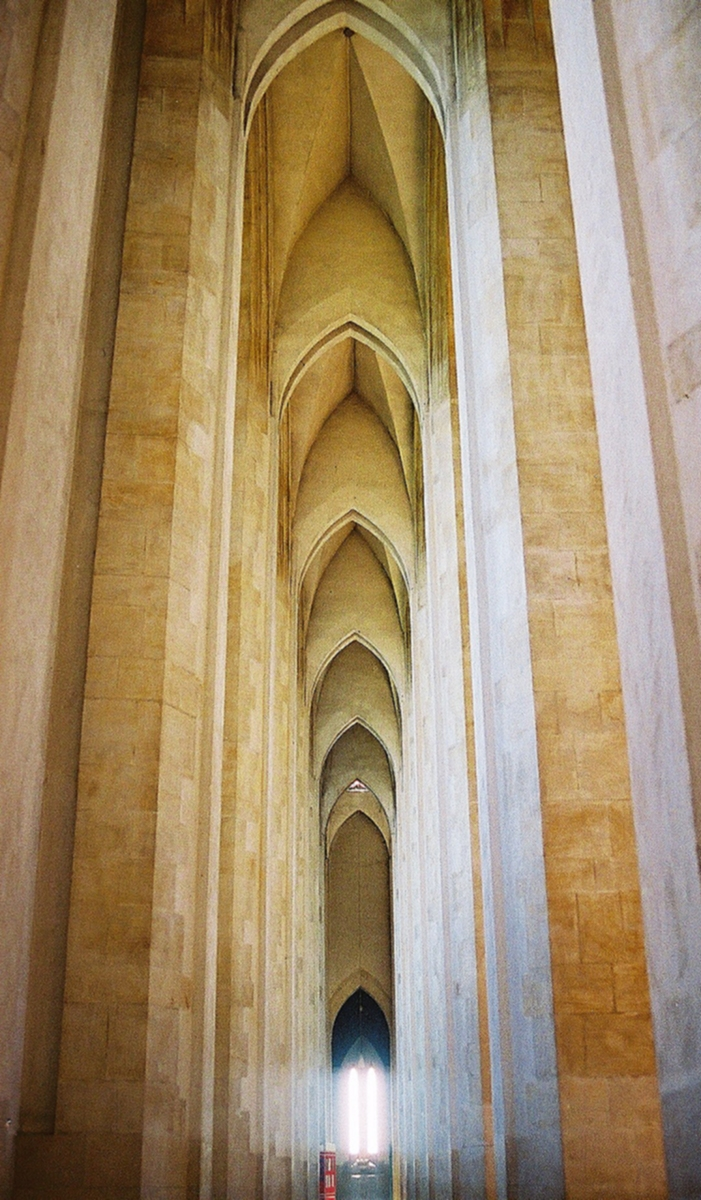
The vaulting of the south nave side aisle

Writing in 1932, Maufe said: "The ideal has been to produce a design, definitely of our own time, yet in the line of the great English Cathedrals; to build anew on tradition, to rely on proportion, mass, volume and line rather than on elaboration and ornament." The Pevsner Architectural Guides describe the building as "sweet-tempered, undramatic Curvilinear Gothic", and the interior as "noble and subtle".

Maufe was influenced by continental cathedrals, notably the 13th-century Albi Cathedral in France, and favoured clean modern design in a Gothic Revival style. He aimed to create a broad and uninterrupted nave space by the use of narrow "passage aisles", which as at Albi, removed the need for flying buttresses. Unlike the French original, the aisles do not quite reach up to the nave roof, resulting in a small clerestory with little windows. When it became apparent that economy would preclude the use of stone, Maufe brought a medieval brick back from Albi, which was copied by the Guildford brick makers for use in the new building.

The tower is 160 feet (49 m) high, and contains twelve bells. At the top of the tower stands a 15-foot (4.6 m) gilded angel, which turns in the wind. Inside, the cathedral appears to be filled with light, with pale Somerset limestone pillars and white Italian marble floors. It is a Grade II* listed building.

The angel on the top of the tower was given in memory of Sgt. Reginald Adgey-Edgar of the Intelligence Corps, who died on active service in 1944 during World War II. It was designed by William Pickford and created by four silversmiths, before being positioned in Spring 1963. The supporting pole for the angel houses mobile phone antennae.

The wooden cross which stands outside the eastern end of the cathedral was erected in 1933 before construction work began to mark the site of the new cathedral. Known as the Ganges Cross, it is made from timbers of Burma teak from the battleship HMS Ganges. The ship's emblem – an elephant – is embedded in the wood.

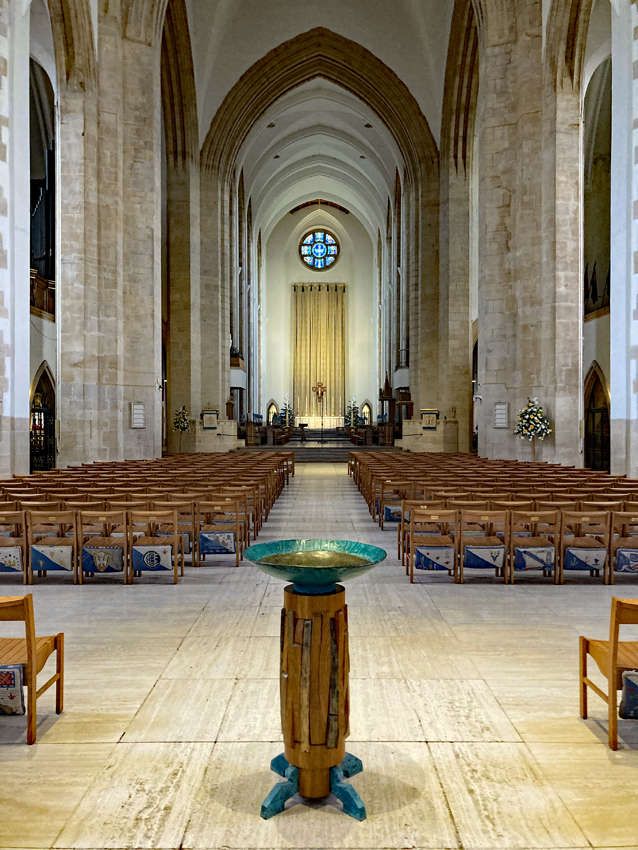
Nave interior. Note the kneelers on the back of the chairs.

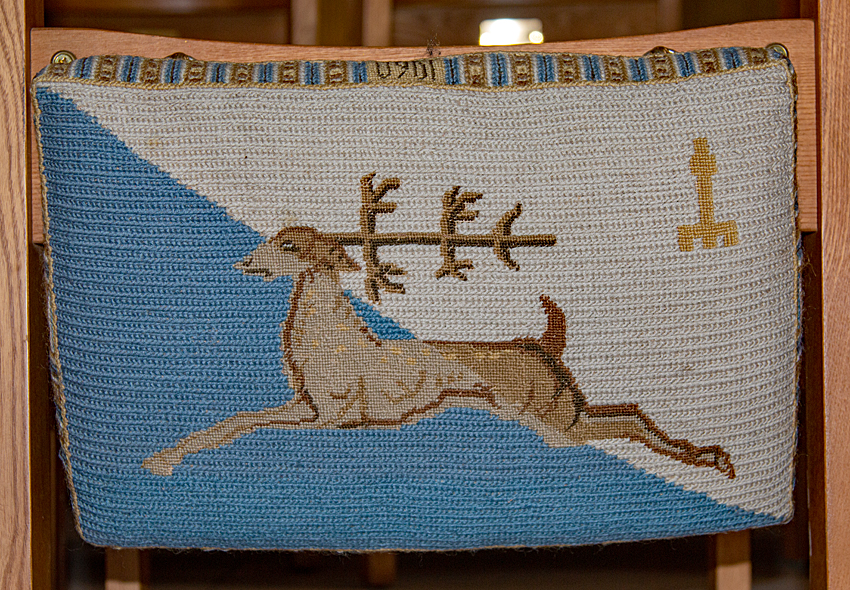
Guildford cathedral kneeler

Sir Edward Maufe's wife, Lady Prudence Maufe – an interior designer, director of Heal and Son Ltd. and member of the Worshipful Company of Broderers – was instrumental in the design of the textiles within the cathedral. Unusually, Maufe's contract included complete control over the internal fittings and colour scheme of the cathedral. This colour scheme references Guildford's wool trade past, notably the blue colour for which Guildford wool was famous. The kneelers, using a combination of standard and individual designs, were each reviewed and approved by Lady Maufe and her committee. Most were made during the late 1950s and early 1960s.

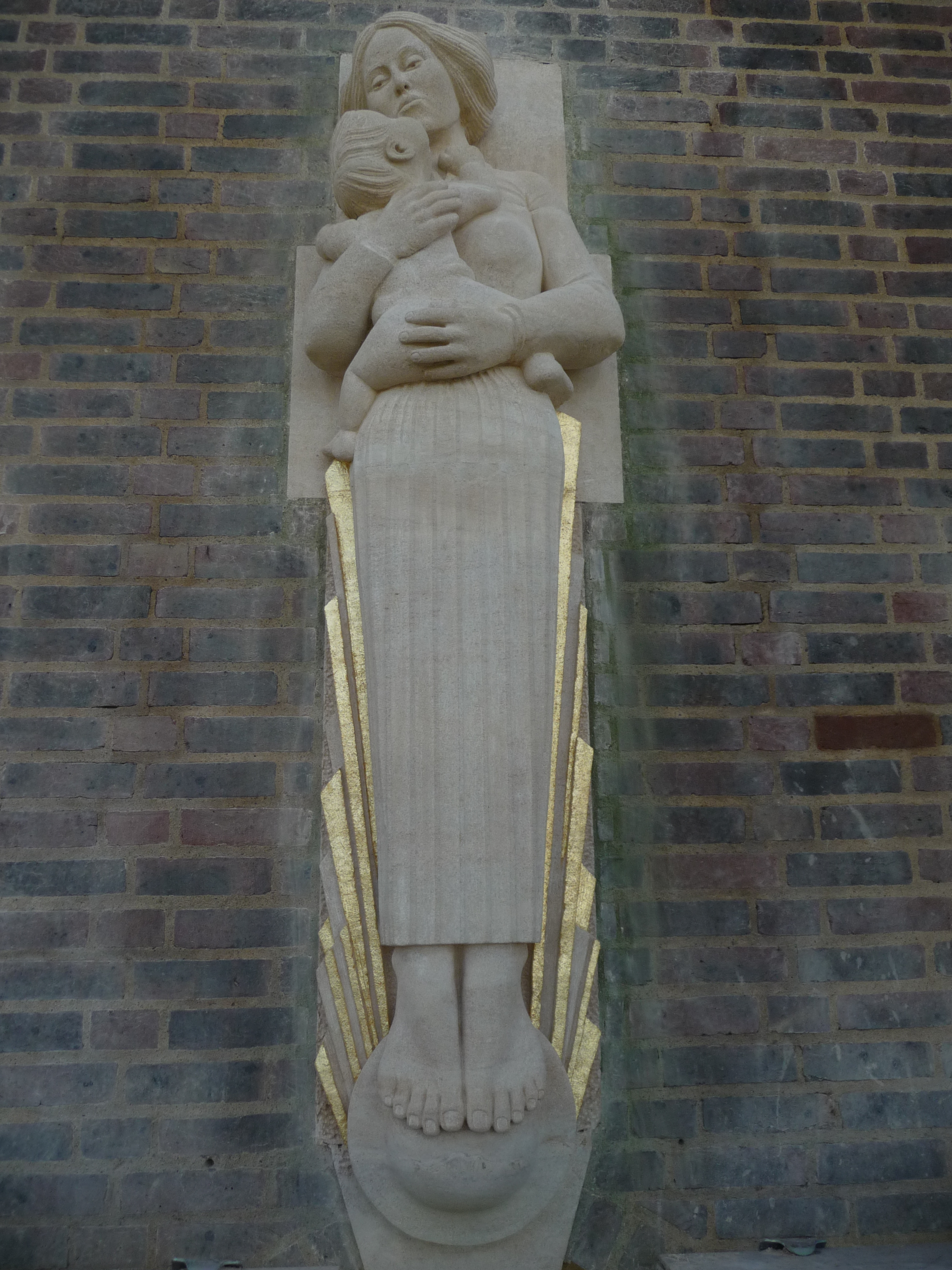
WWI mother and child by Nicholas Thompson

20th-century sculptors and artists are well represented at Guildford Cathedral, including Eric Gill, Vernon Hill, Mary Spencer Watson, Dennis Huntley, Alan Collins and local artists John Cobbett and Douglas Stephen. Charles Gurrey created a series of sculptures above the West Front, to mark the Millennium, whilst Canadian sculptor Nicholas Thompson completed a sculpture of a World War I mother and child in 2016.

There are three side chapels. The Children's Chapel is dedicated to children who have died, and holds a book of remembrance for children of any age. The Chapel of the Queen's Royal Surrey Regiment holds the regimental colours and was dedicated in 1959 to the Honour of King Charles the Martyr. The Queen's Royal Regiment was founded in 1661 as the Tangiers Regiment on the marriage of King Charles II and Catherine of Braganza.

== Glass ==
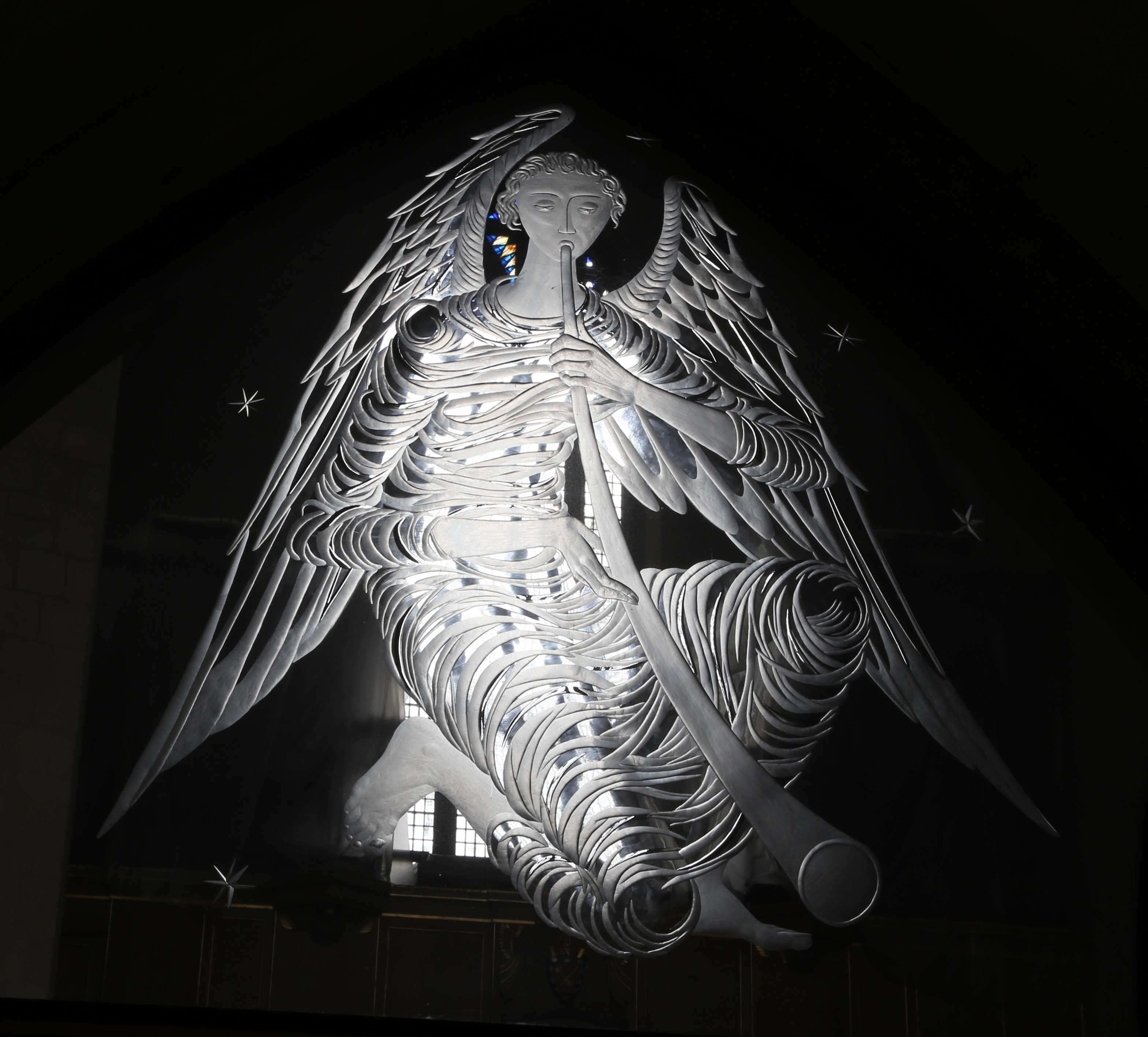
One of three etched glass angels above the south porch doors, by John Hutton

The cathedral contains fewer stained glass windows than many comparable church buildings, having a predominantly clear glazing scheme (using opaque glass to soften the light) to complement the modernist architectural style of the building. However it includes works by Moira Forsyth, William Wilson, James Powell and Sons, Ninian Comper and Lawrence Lee.

There are etched glass works by New Zealand-born artist John Hutton. One set adorns the panel at the west entrance; the other is above the internal doors to the south porch. In January 2024 one of the panes on the west front door was smashed in an act of apparent vandalism.

== Dean and Cathedral Clergy ==
As of 30 May 2019:

- Dean — Dianna Gwilliams (since 15 September 2013 installation)
- Sub-Dean (SSM) — Stuart Beake (canon residentiary since 2010)
- Residentiary Canon with responsibility for Public Engagement and Pastoral Care – Chris Hollingshurst (since 24 January 2021)
- Priest Vicar- Mavis Wilson (SSM)
- Anglican Chaplain to the University of Surrey and Priest Vicar – Duncan Myers (from January 2020)

== Music ==
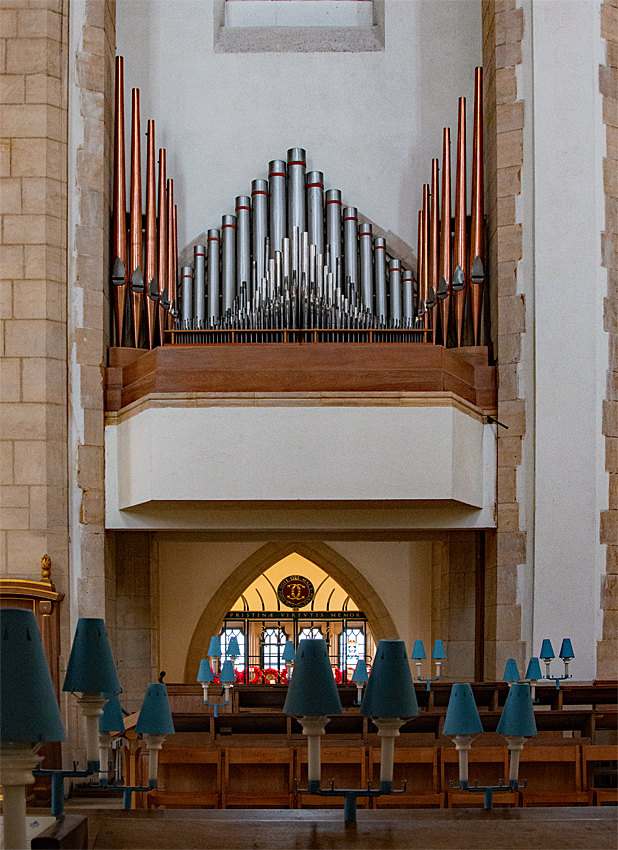
Guildford cathedral positive organ

=== Organ ===
The cathedral organ was installed in 1961 by the Liverpool firm of Rushworth and Dreaper. It is a reconstruction of an organ dating from c. 1866, previously in the Rosse Street Baptist Church in Shipley, West Yorkshire. The organ, probably built by Nicholson of Bradford, was a gift of the Coulthurst Trust. During the cathedral's renovation in 2015 to 2017, the organ was dismantled and refurbished by David Wells Organ Builders. There are approximately 4,600 pipes across both the main and positive organs.

A second organ, also supplied by Rushworth and Dreaper, is installed in the musicians gallery of the Lady Chapel.

=== Organists ===
Organists at Guildford Cathedral have included the composer Philip Moore. Katherine Dienes-Williams became the first female Organist and Master of the Choristers in an English Anglican Cathedral in January 2008.

=== Choir ===
The Cathedral Choir was formed for the consecration of the cathedral in May 1961. It consists of boy choristers, who sing at Sunday services and Choral Evensong on Tuesdays and Thursdays, and are educated at the RGS Preparatory School. Since 2002, girl choristers have sung on Sundays and Evensong on Fridays. There are six lay clerks, professional adult singers; two altos, two tenors and two basses. They sing on Sundays and at Evensong on weekdays. The Guildford Cathedral Singers are a voluntary mixed-voice choir, who sing at special services and when the Cathedral Choir is on holiday.

=== Bells ===
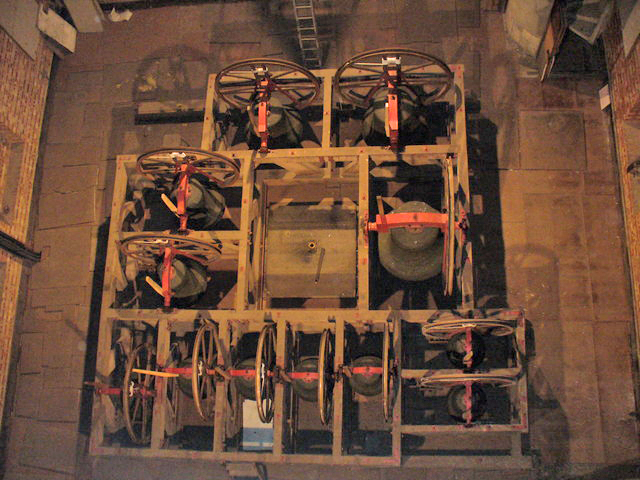
The twelve bells from above

Guildford Cathedral has a ring of twelve bells; ten of which were cast by Mears and Stainbank in 1965. The bells were augmented to 12 with two Whitechapel trebles in 1975. The largest bell is the tenor which weighs 30 cwt and 43 lbs (1,543.5 kg), and is tuned to the key of D. A team of about 25 volunteer bellringers practice on Tuesdays. In June 2022, the cathedral hosted the final of the National Twelve-Bell Striking Contest.

== In popular culture ==
The Cathedral served as a filming location for The Omen, a 1976 horror film. It has also appeared in several television programmes, including The Sandman, and The Witcher, as well as being used in many BBC television and radio shows.

In 2024, local bus operator, Safeguard Coaches, used the cathedral as a backdrop to the company's centenary celebrations with a display of vintage buses.

== See also ==
- Exterior sculpture of Guildford Cathedral
- List of cathedrals in the United Kingdom
