= Exterior sculpture of Guildford Cathedral =

Coordinates: 51°14′28″N 0°35′24″W

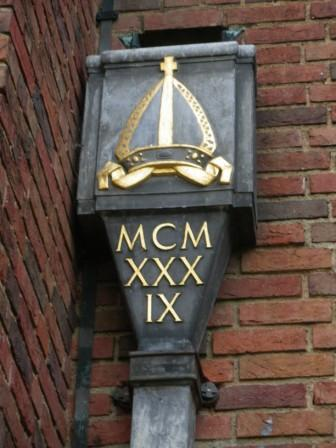
A distinctive Guildford Cathedral Drainpipe. Edward Maufe wanted even the building's fittings to reflect "the glory of god"

The exterior sculpture of Guildford Cathedral provides many artistic features, including sculptures, engravings and more by some of England’s finest sculptors and craftsmen of the 1950s and 1960s. The people who worked on the cathedral include: Edward Maufe, Alan Collins, Vernon Hill, Eric Gill, John Hutton, Dennis Huntley and others.

The cathedral is an Anglican cathedral at Guildford, Surrey, England.

== Background ==
Having decided in 1928 to build a new cathedral, the diocese awarded the commission to Edward Maufe who served as the cathedral architect. Due to the Second World War and inadequate financing, construction was stopped for many years. In 1955, when building materials and funding was available, construction of the nave began. Although construction was not entirely completed, the cathedral was consecrated in May 1961. By 1966 construction was completed on the Western Porches, tower, Lady Chapel, the Sacristy, and Chapel House.

== The West Door ==
At the West Door are three central windows and at the top of these is the carving “The Hand of God” by sculptor Alan Collins. The hand is surmounted by the sun, moon and stars- an invitation from God to be part of the Christian Community.

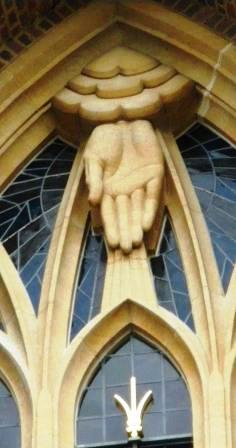
The carving “The Hand of God” by Alan Collins

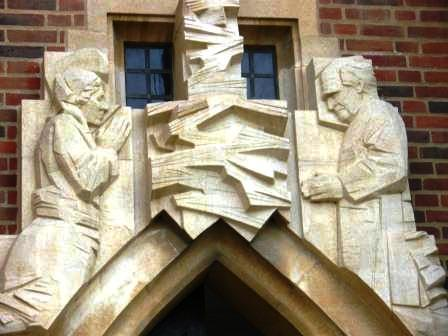
One of Charles Gurrey’s carvings above the West Door

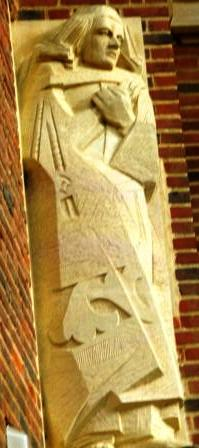
Another of Charles Gurrey’s carvings above the West Door

Beneath these central windows and above the West Door are several carvings. These were dedicated by the Very Reverend Alex Wedderspoon, Dean Emeritus, on Whit Sunday in 2004. The figures are carved from Clipsham stone. Below the central figure of the Transfigured Christ are figures of men and women whose lives were thought to reflect the Holy Spirit. Four of these figures are from the past – St Bernard, St Benedict, St Columba and Dame Julian of Norwich and the other four feature contemporary Christians – Evelyn Underhill, Bede Griffiths, Reginald Somerset Ward and Archbishop Michael Ramsey.

== The South Garth ==
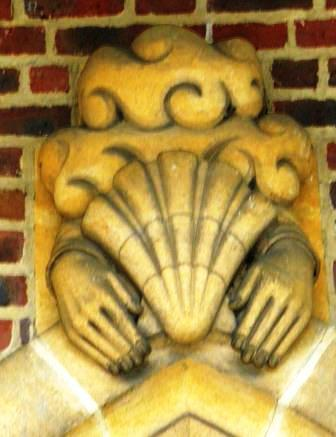
A work by Alan Collins above the South Garth

On either side of the West Door are the North and South Garth which have been described as two welcoming arms.

Above the South Garth is a carving which shows a scallop shell held by two hands symbolizing the Paten with Communion bread. The scallop shell was traditionally a sign that a pilgrim had paid a visit to the shrine of St James at Compostella in North West Spain where scallop shells were abundant on the beaches. On the other side of the South Garth there is another carving this an open book with the words “Veni, Creator, Spiritus”– “Come Holy Spirit”, words which appear often throughout the cathedral.

== The Cathedral Drainpipes ==
As one walks around the cathedral one sees many quite distinctive drainpipes. This was one of Edward Maufe’s wishes; he wanted even the mundane drainpipe to reflect “The Glory of God”. They bear Roman Numerals being the dates they were installed and some bear the inscription “Veni, Creator, Spiritus”.

== The Seven Christian Virtues ==
Having passed through the South Garth there are seven figures carved at the base of the windows and these represent the Seven Christian Virtues- “Charity”, “Hope”, “Faith”, “Courage”, “Temperance”, “Prudence” and “Justice”. The statue of “Prudence” is it seems based on Prudence Maufe, the wife of the architect; even the shoes are in the style of shoes which she wore. “Hope” and “Justice” were the work of the sculptor Richard Browne. “Faith” was the work of John Cobbett and “Charity”, “Courage”, “Temperance” and “Prudence” were the work of Alan Collins. The statue “Faith” was a gift from the Women’s Royal Army Corps.

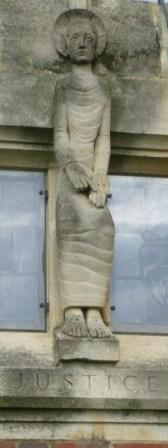
The representation of “Justice” by Richard Browne.

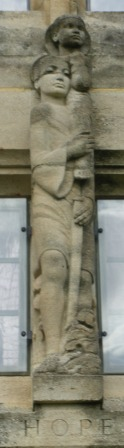
The representation of “Hope” by Richard Browne

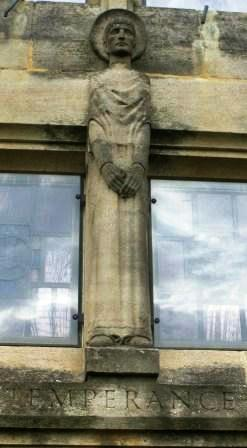
The representation of “Temperance” by Alan Collins

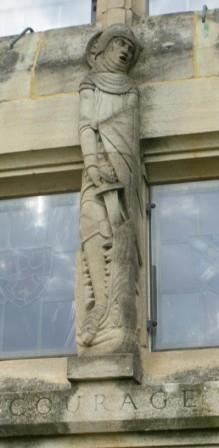
The representation of “Courage” by Alan Collins

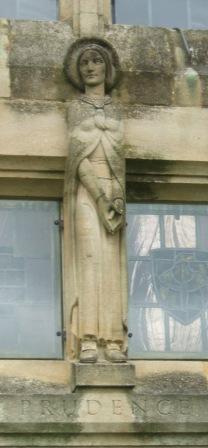
The representation of “Prudence” by Alan Collins

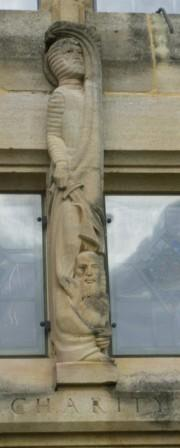
The representation of “Charity” by Alan Collins

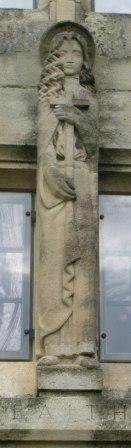
The representation of “Faith” by John Cobbet

John Cobbett incidentally executed a fine “Madonna and Child” and “St Francis” both of which can be seen inside the cathedral.

== The Cathedral Tower ==
The cathedral tower is 156 feet (48 metres) high and holds 12 bells weighing in total some 6.5 tons. Above the south balcony is the sculptor Dennis Huntley’s St Hubert which was carved by Huntley “in situ”. Above the east balcony is a WWI Memorial depicting a mother and child, carved by sculptor Nicholas Thompson in situ in 2016.

The Gilded Angel at the top of the tower was the work of Hurst, Franklin & Co of Islington and the 12 bells were made at the Whitechapel Bell Foundry.

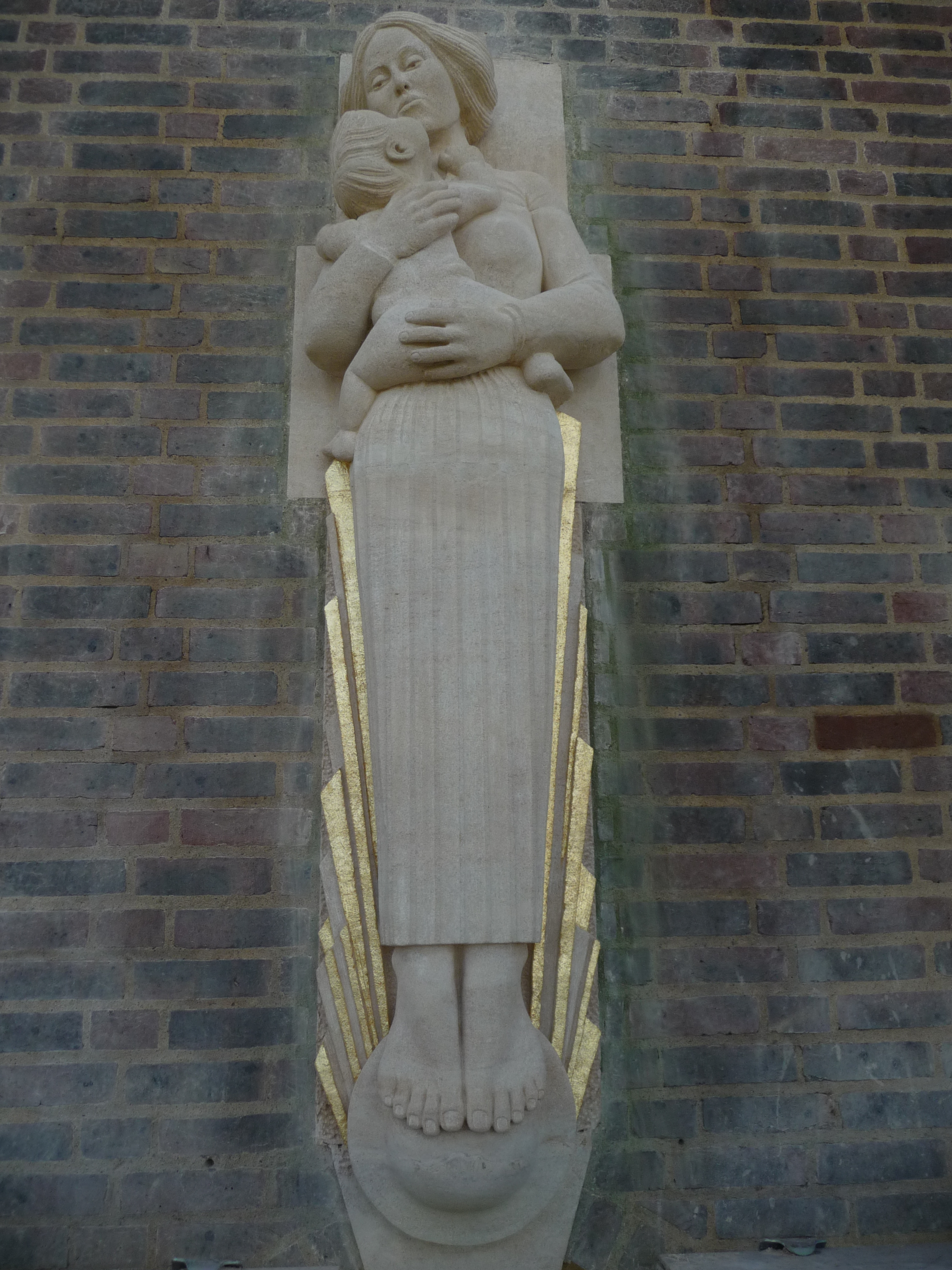

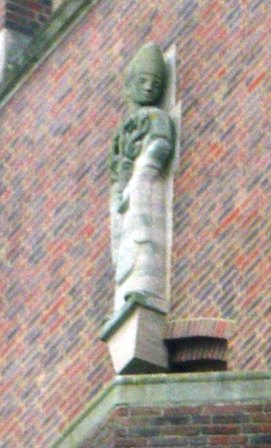
The statue of St Hubert by Dennis Huntley

== The South Door ==
Above the South Door is Eric Gill’s figure of St John the Baptist. There is a small maquette used for this work near the pulpit inside the cathedral.

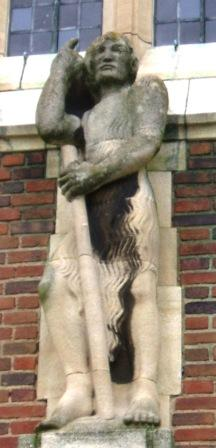
Eric Gill’s “St John the Baptist” above the south door

The reliefs on the two bronze doors set under two arches here are the work of Vernon Hill and are depictions of various occupations, some of men, others of women. The men’s occupations are on the right side door- woodcutting, fishing, hunting, sowing, shepherding and ploughing and on the left side door we have the occupations accredited to women- milking, harvesting, nursing, teaching, spinning and motherhood.

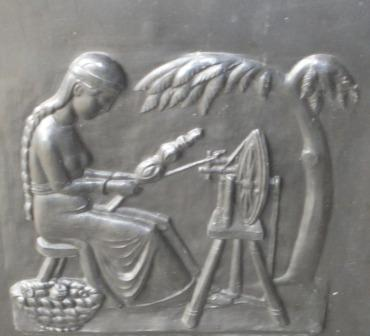
Spinning

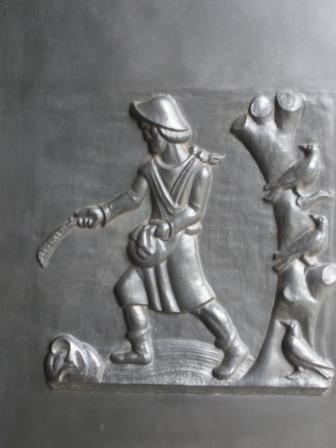
Sowing

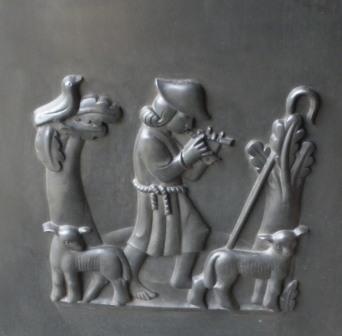
Shepherding

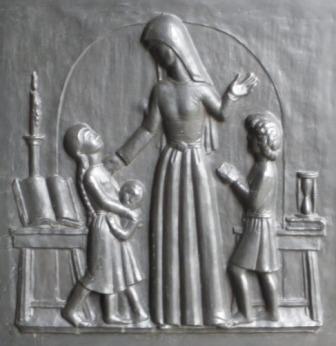
Teaching

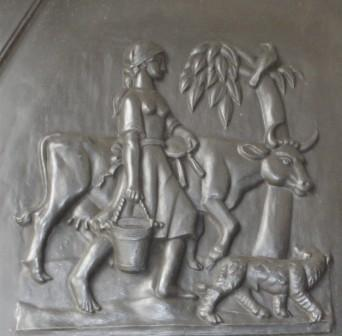
Milking

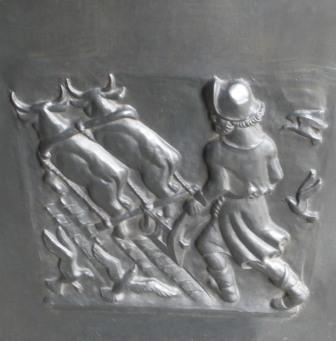
Ploughing

Vernon Hill was also responsible for carving the angels on the Sedilia inside the cathedral, as well as the “tongues of flames” on the pulpit and lectern. He also carved the Arms of Bishop Greig over the inside of the Sacristy Door and St Ursula over the inside of St Ursula’s Porch.

== St Ursula’s Porch ==
After the South Door entrance is St Ursula’s Porch with Eric Gill’s carving over it of the Diocesan Coat of Arms and by the side of the porch is a plaque carrying the name "Maufe" and a crest above it. This is the signature stone of Edward Maufe. This door is also known as the “Bishop’s Entrance” and the door handles are shaped like a bishop’s crozier.

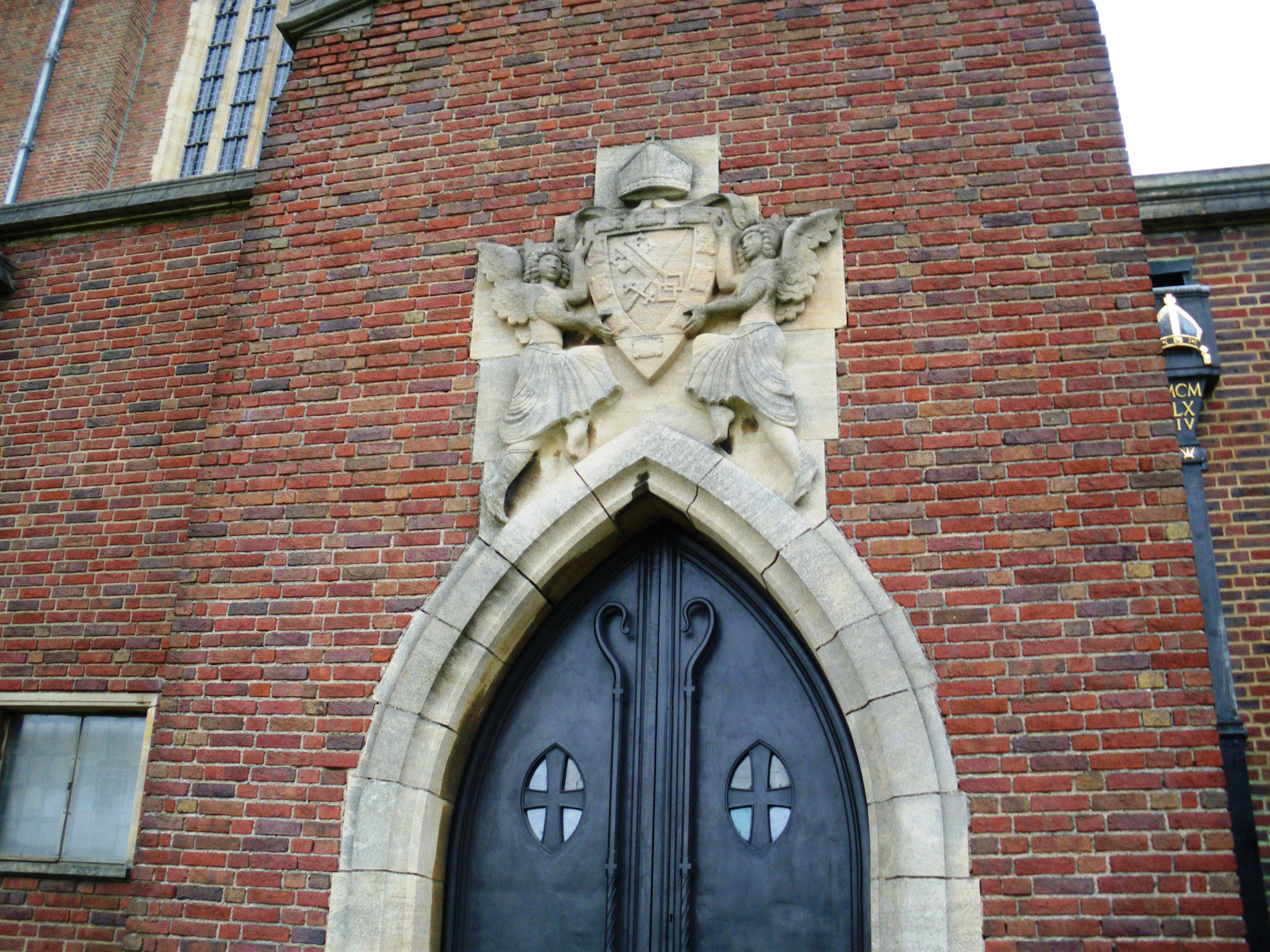
The “Bishop’s Entrance”/St Ursula's Porch with handles shaped like a bishop’s crozier

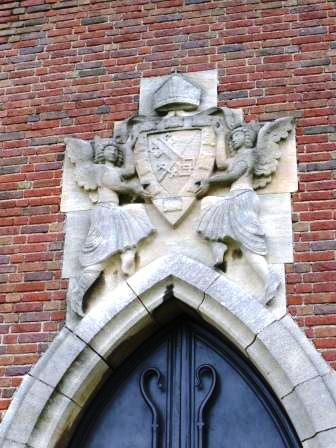
Guildford-Diocesan Coat of Arms

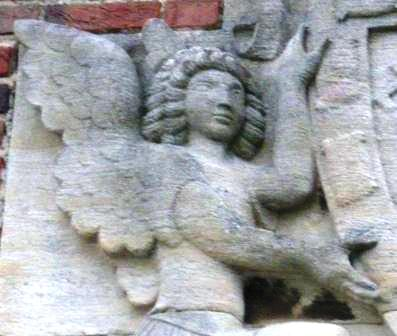
Guildford-Diocesan Coat of Arms

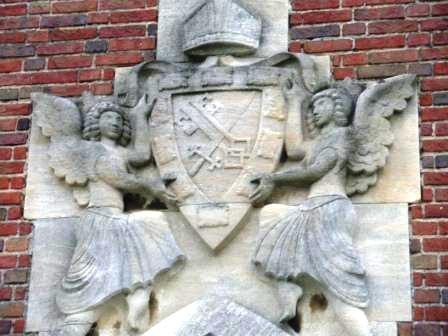
}Guildford-Diocesan Coat of Arms

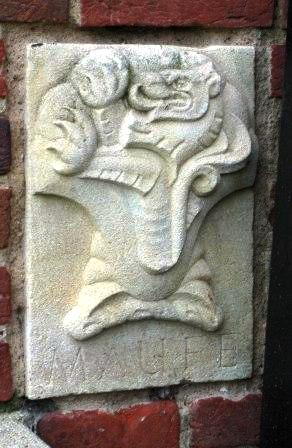
Guildford-Maufe's Stone

== The Lady Chapel ==
The bell and weathervane are part of the Lady Chapel and the bell was first rung in December 1947 on the occasion of the dedication of the Crypt Chapel. Here the large sculpture above the round window is to the design of Eric Gill and portrays the crucifixion, illustrating the text- “The eternal god is your refuge and underneath are the everlasting arms” Eric Gill died before he was able to carve this piece and the carving was done by Anthony Foster Gill’s assistant. Foster died at the young age of 47 in 1957 and had taught stone-carving at Camberwell School of Art.

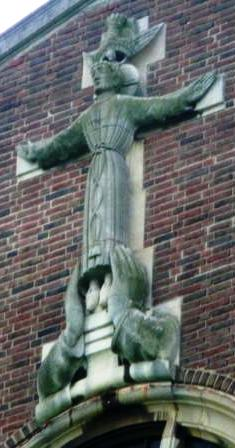
”The eternal god is your refuge and underneath are the everlasting arms”

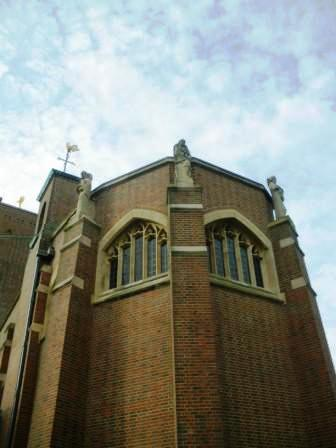
The Buttress

== The Buttress ==
At the eastern end of the cathedral are the buttresses of the Lady’s Chapel with statues of St.Cecilia, St Martha of Bethany, St Catherine and Lady Margaret Beaufort.

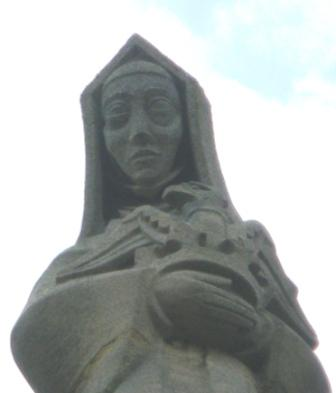
A close-up of the statue of Lady Margaret Beaufort by Dennis Huntley

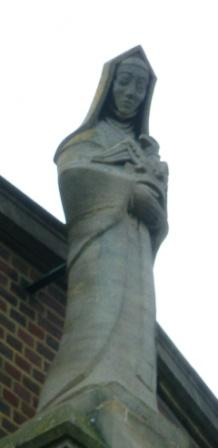
The statue of Lady Margaret Beaufort by Dennis Huntley

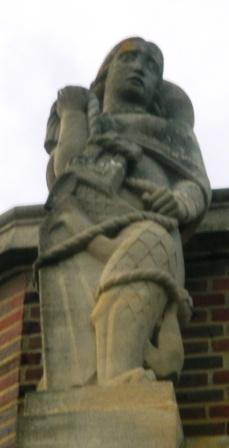
The statue of St Martha of Bethany

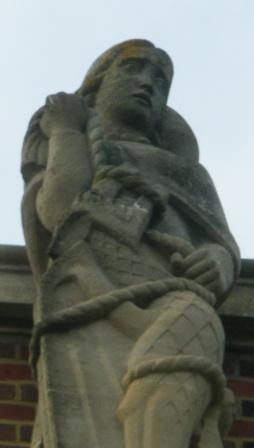
A close-up of the statue of St Catherine.

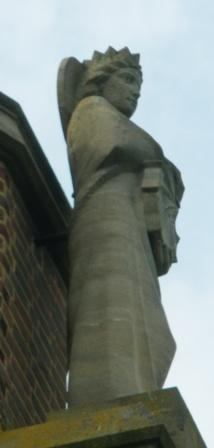
The statue of St Catherine

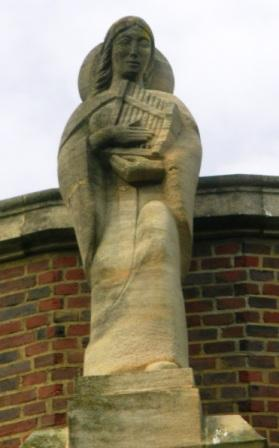
The statue of St Cecilia.

The statues of St Cecilia and Lady Margaret Beaufort are the work of Dennis Huntley and those of St Martha of Bethany and St Catherine are by Alan Collins.

Dennis Huntley also carved two of the limewood figures on the corners of the ceiling of the children’s chapel inside the cathedral. In the other two corners are the gilded limewood angels by Mary Spencer Watson.

== The Seven Gifts of the Spirit ==
Along the north side of the cathedral are another seven figures at the bases of the seven windows these representing the “Seven Gifts of the Spirit”: wisdom, understanding, counsel, fortitude, knowledge, piety and fear of the Lord. Most of the works were made by Alan Collins, but "Piety" was made by Dennis Huntley and "Fear" by Karin Jonzen.

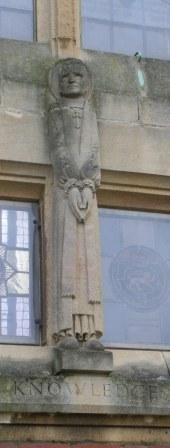
The representation of “Knowledge”, by Alan Collins

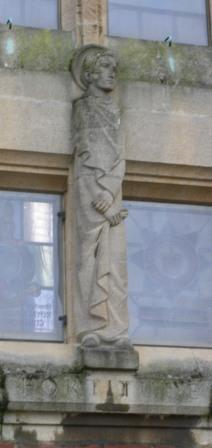
The representation of “Fortitude”, by Alan Collins

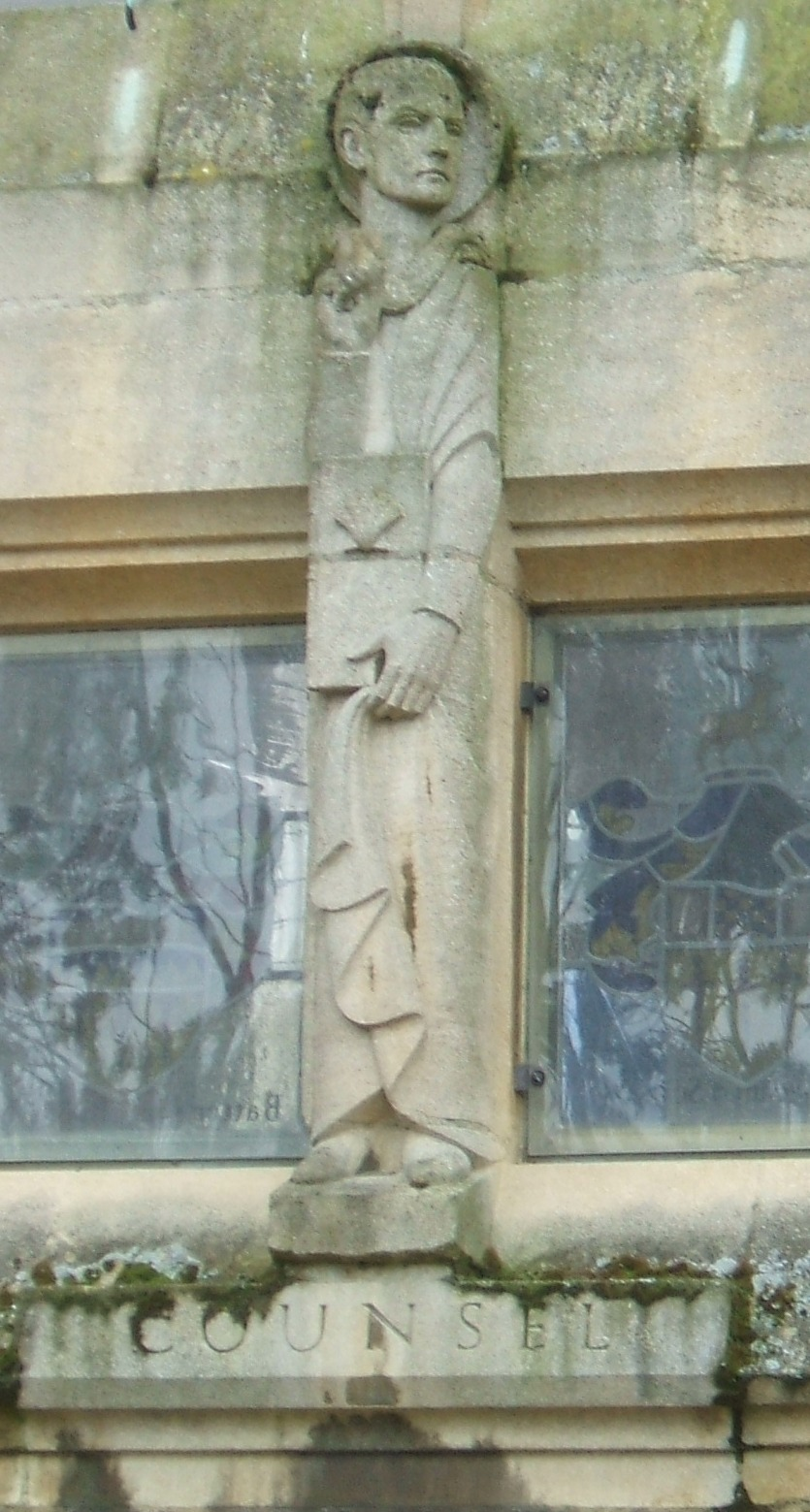
The representation of “Counsel”, by Alan Collins

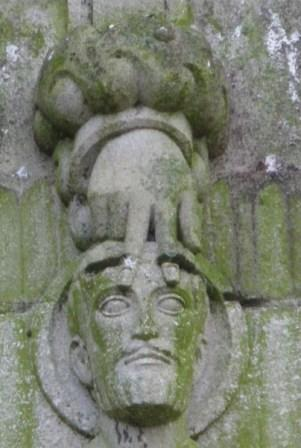
Close-up of the representation of “Understanding, by Alan Collins

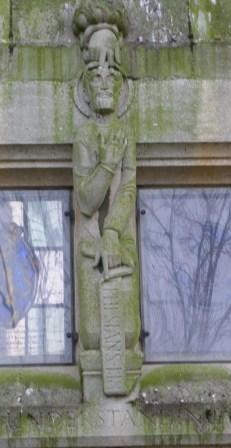
The representation of “Understanding”, by Alan Collins

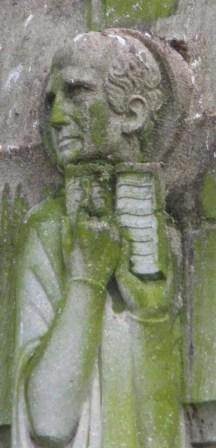
Close-up of the representation of “Wisdom”, by Alan Collins

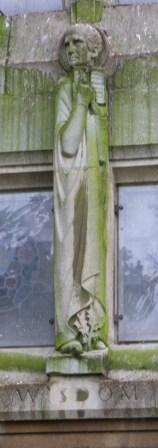
The representation of “Wisdom”, by Alan Collins

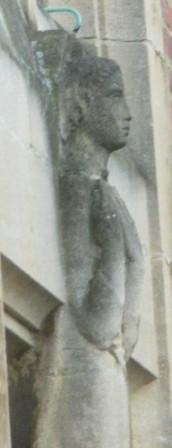
The representation of “Fear”, by Karin Jonzen

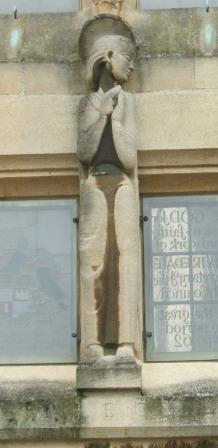
The representation of “Piety", by Dennis Huntley

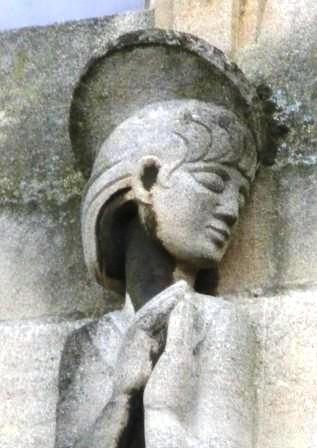
Close-up of “Piety”, by Dennis Huntley

== The North Garth ==
Above the inside of the archway of the North Garth is a carving of a hand holding a dove representing the Holy Spirit, this by Alan Collins and on the other side is another Collins carving of a chalice filled with Communion wine, this juxtaposed with the carving at the front of the South Garth which represented the Communion bread or wafer. Thus the two “welcoming arms” of the two garths show the two features of the Eucharist; the Communion wine and the Communion bread.

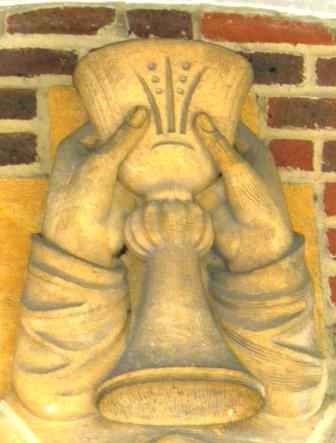
Carving on the front of the North Garth

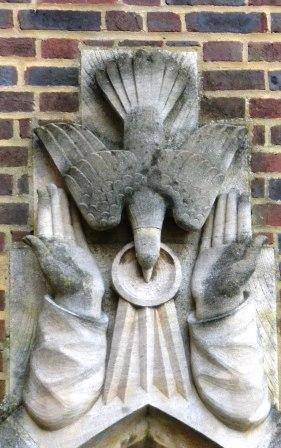
Carving on inside arch of North Garth
