= Mary Spencer Watson =

British sculptor

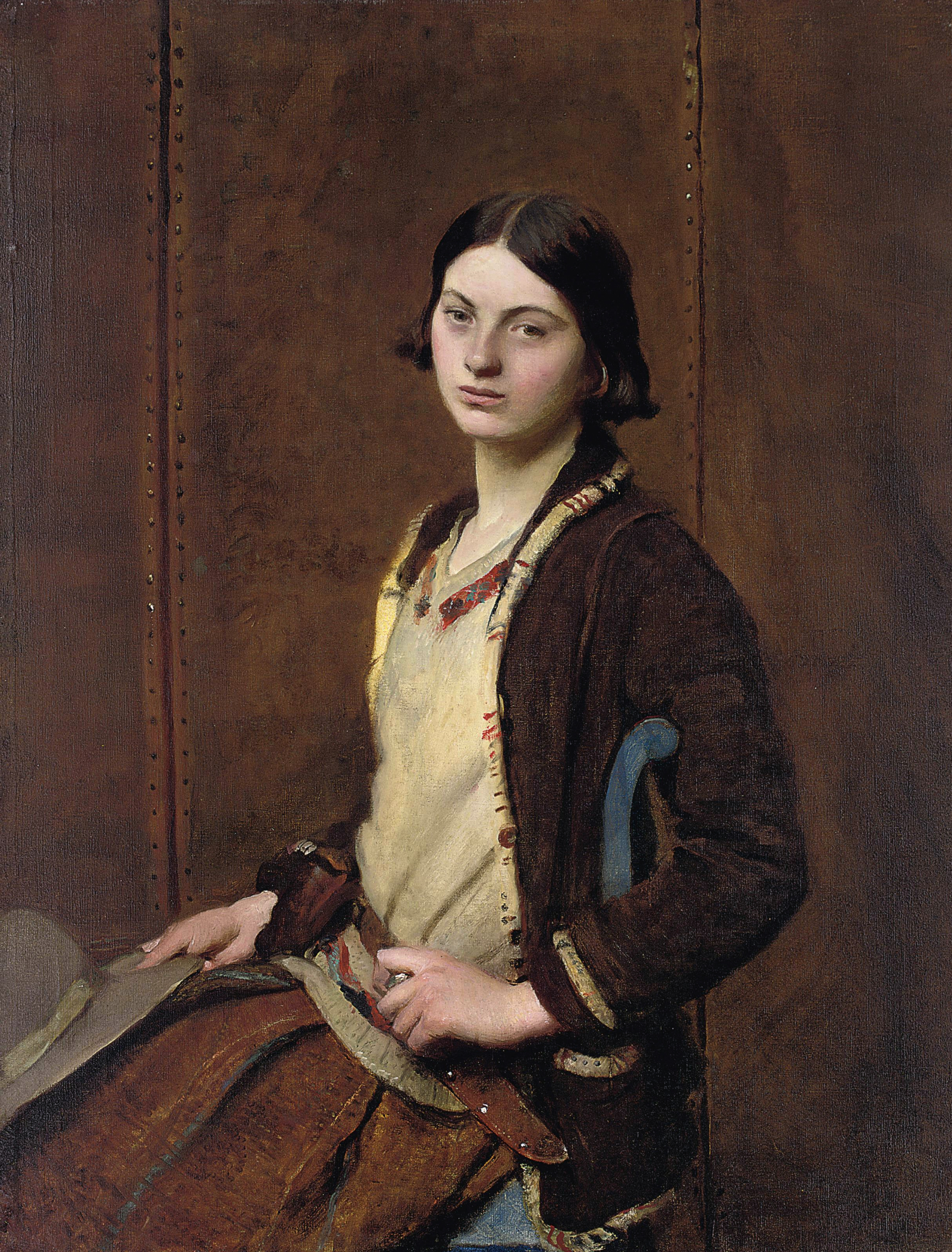
- Mary Spencer Watson by George Spencer Watson, 1930.
- Born: 7 May 1913; London, England
- Died: 7 March 2006 (aged 92); Langton Matravers, Dorset, England
- Education: Bournemouth Municipal College; Slade School of Fine Art; Royal Academy Schools; Central School of Arts and Crafts
- Known for: Sculpture

Mary Spencer Watson (7 May 1913 – 7 March 2006) was an English sculptor. Watson was born in London and spent most of her life in Dorset and was inspired by watching masons carving Purbeck stone, close to her family home there. Her works can be seen at Cambridge University and Wells Cathedrals, among other sites.

== Biography ==
Watson was born in London and in 1923 her family moved to a country house in Dorset. Her father was the artist George Spencer Watson and her mother, Hilda, was a dancer and mime artist. Her father purchased Dunshay Manor situated in the parish of Worth Matravers which became Watson's home for the rest of her life. The family decorated the Manor in the arts and crafts style and used its outbuildings as studios and for dance and theatre productions. Dunshay Manor was near Langton Matravers on the Isle of Purbeck and there were several stone quarries in the area. Watson became fascinated by the masons and quarrymen she saw working the local Purbeck stone with traditional tools and decided to become a sculptor.

Watson attended Bournemouth Municipal College one day a week during 1929 and 1930 to prepare a portfolio for the Royal Academy Schools entrance examination. Rejected by the Academy, Watson studied at the Slade School of Art in London for a year before she was accepted into the Royal Academy Schools in 1932. Watson studied there for three years during which time she won several prizes and awards. To get more experience of carving she enrolled at the Central School of Art and Crafts in 1936 where she was taught by John Skeaping and Alfred Turner.

In 1937, Watson had her first solo exhibition, consisting of pieces in terracotta, marble, wood and alabaster, at the Mansard Gallery at Heal's in Tottenham Court Road. Later that year she spent three months in the Paris studio of Ossip Zadkine at 100 bis, rue d'Assas, now the Musée Zadkine, where she carved a number of compositions, including an eight foot high figure. Watson returned to England in 1938 and remained there during World War II, which she spent doing farm work at Dunshay Manor and teaching art and sculpture in schools throughout Dorset.

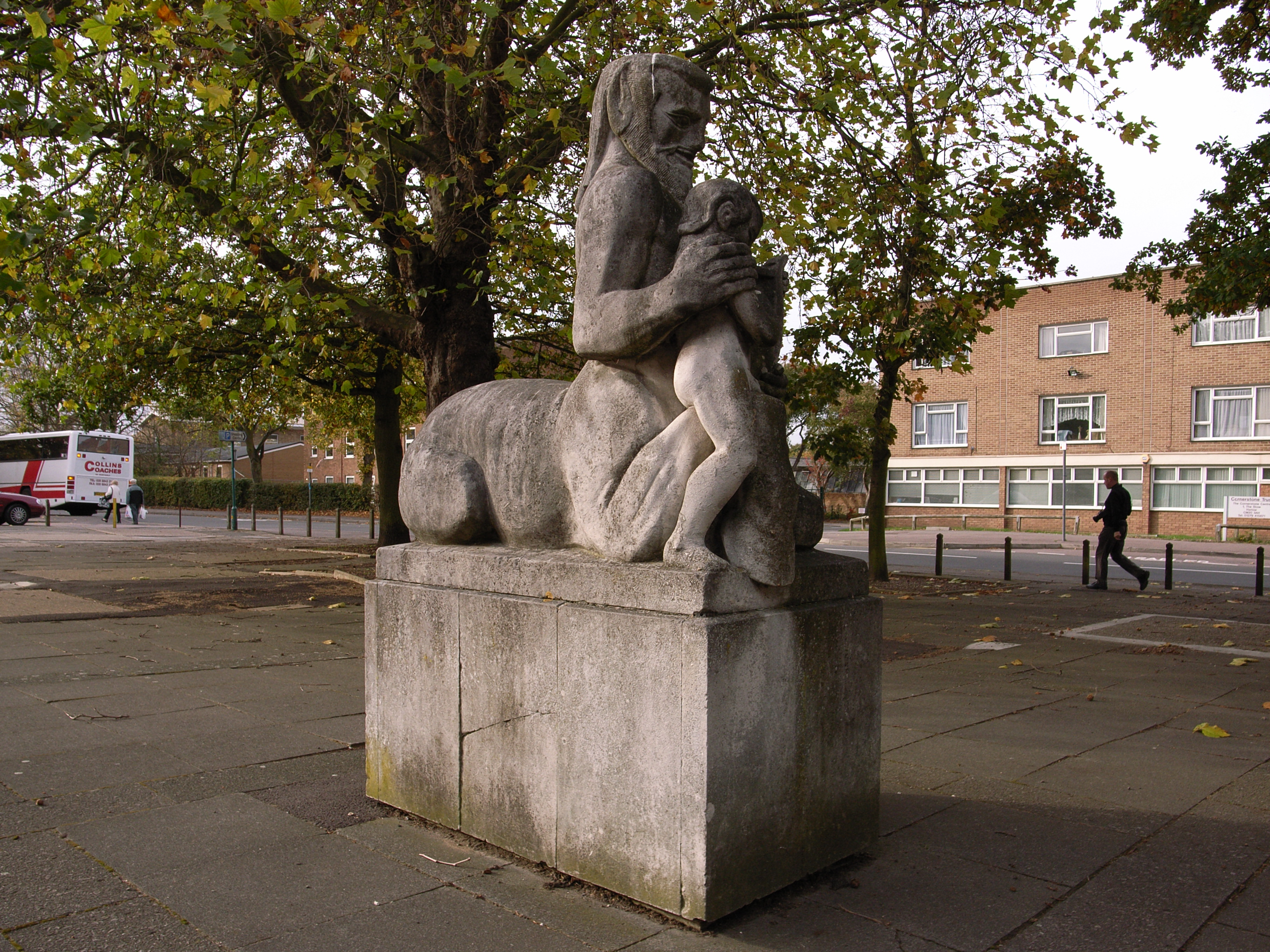
Chiron (1953), Harlow, Essex

After the War, Watson received several public commissions, often for large architectural pieces. These included two commissions from the architect Sir Frederick Gibberd for Magic Beast for Crofton Common Infant School at Longbridge and for Chiron Teaching the Young Hero for Harlow New Town. A visit to Greece in 1953 inspired Musician, a large Purbeck stone carving which was shown at the Royal Academy in 1955. Seen by Sir Edward Maufe this led to a commission for two gilded limewood angels for Guildford Cathedral. In 1958 Watson completed a commission for Cambridge University, creating a bas-relief series for the exterior of the Chemistry Faculty Building depicting the university arms and five alchemy symbols. Her Four Symbols of the Evangelists, in Purbeck stone, now lead to the north entrance of Wells Cathedral. In 2000, in the churchyard at Langton Matravers, Watson installed Purbeck Quarryman. Watson exhibited with the Fine Art Society, at Foyles Gallery, at the National Society of Painters, Sculptors and Gravers, with the New Art Centre and the Women's International Art Club. She had solo shows at Pelter/ Sands in Bristol, at the Dorset County Museum and a large retrospective at the Salisbury and South Wiltshire Museum, with pieces shown at Salisbury Cathedral, in 2004.

For fifty years until her death, Watson was in a relationship with Margot Baynes who lived at Dunshay Manor with her children. Watson bequeathed the property to the Landmark Trust who, after a lengthy legal argument with Margot's daughter, Hetty Baynes, restored the Manor and began hosting public events there in April 2019.

== Selected exhibitions ==
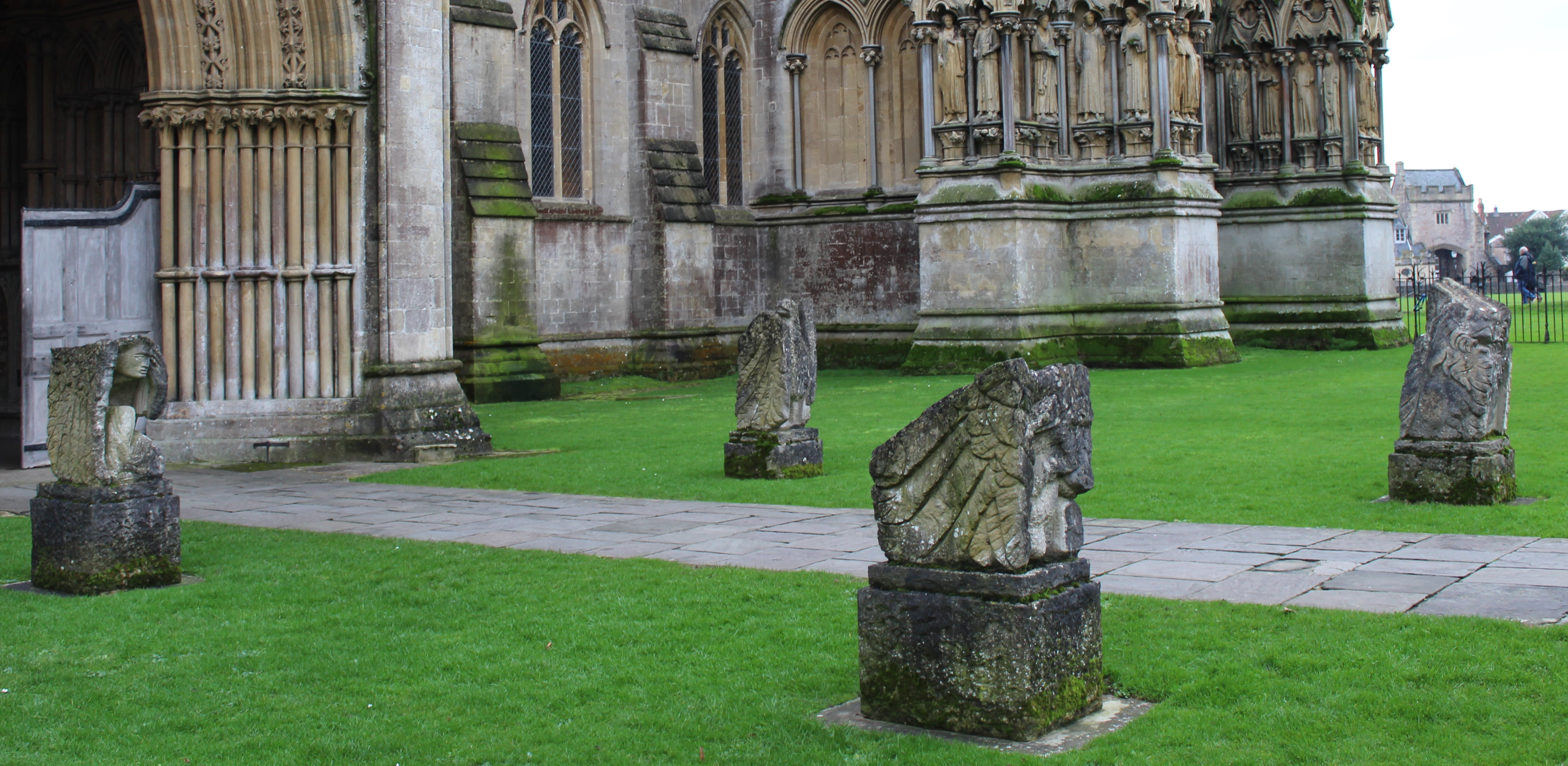
Four Symbols of the Evangelists, Wells Cathedral

- Mansard Gallery, Heal's, London, 1937 (first solo exhibition)
- National Society of Painters, Sculptors, Engravers, Potters, 1940, 1947
- Royal Academy, London, 1940–1934
- Women's International Arts Club, 1947, 1950, 1951
- Arts & Crafts Exhibition Society, Victoria & Albert Museum, 1950
- Dorset County Museum, 1976, 1981, 1998 (solo)
- New Art Centre, London, 1985, 1989, 1990 (solo)
- New Art Centre, Roche Court, Wiltshire, 1987–2004
- Pelter Sands, Bristol, 1988, 1990
- Cookham Trinity Arts Festival, 1994 (solo)
