= George Spencer Watson =

British painter

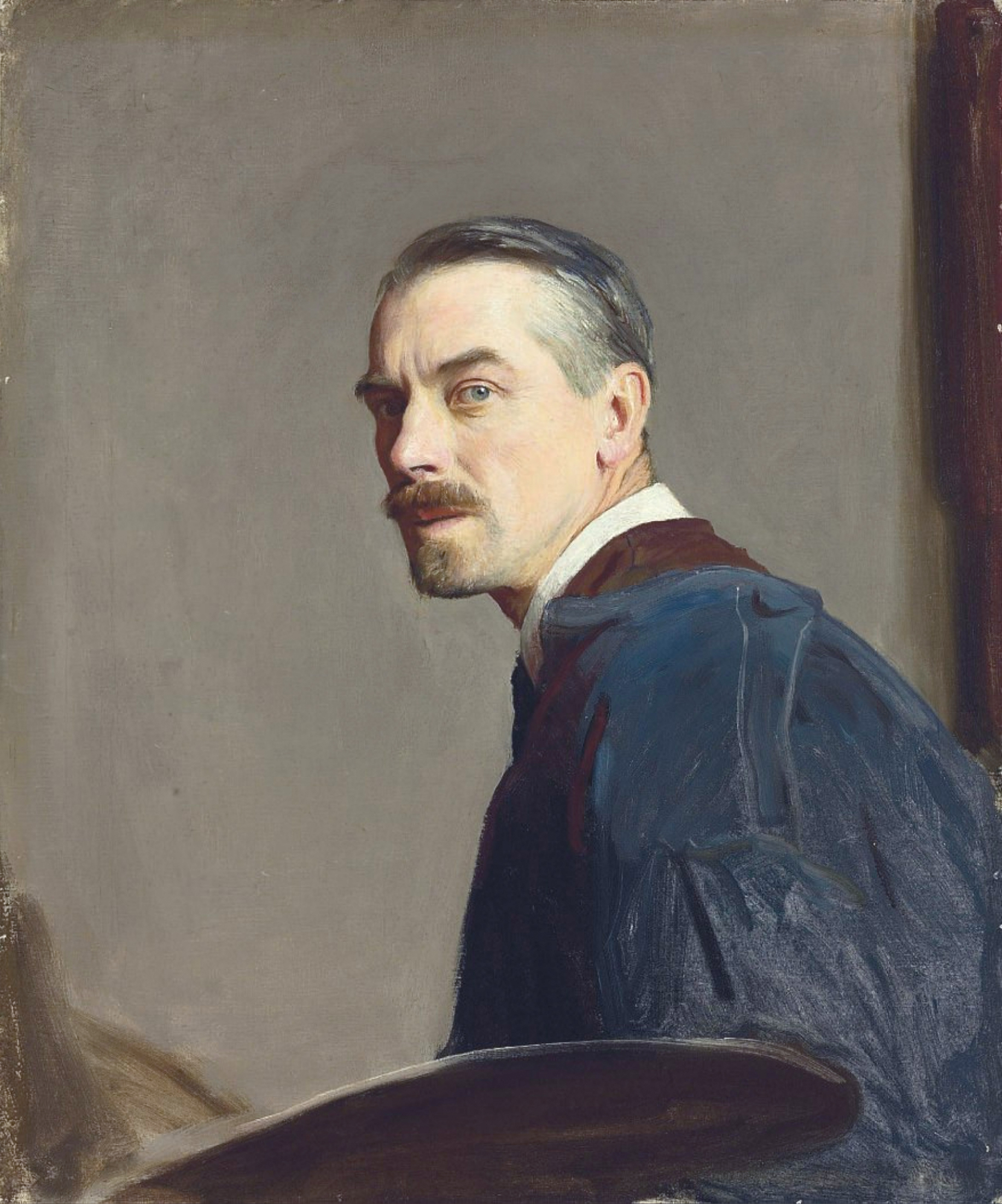
Self portrait

George Spencer Watson R.O.I., R.P., A.R.A., R.A. (8 March 1869, in London – 11 April 1934, in London) was an English portrait artist of the late romantic school who sometimes worked in the style of the Italian Renaissance.

== Career ==
He studied at the Royal Academy Schools from 1889, and exhibited at the Royal Academy from 1891. He won Royal Academy Schools Silver Medals in 1889 and 1891, and the Landseer Scholarship in 1892. He was elected to the Royal Institute of Oil Painters (ROI) in 1900, Royal Society of Portrait Painters (RP) in 1904, Associate of the Royal Academy in 1923, and a Member of the Royal Academy (RA) in 1932. His work was also part of the painting event in the art competition at the 1928 Summer Olympics.

== Personal life ==
In 1909 he married Hilda Mary Gardiner, a dancer and mime artist, and follower of the actor Edward Gordon Craig. They had a daughter, Mary Spencer Watson (1913–2006), who became a sculptor. In the year of 1923 he bought Dunshay Manor in the hills of the Isle of Purbeck, after already having spent holidays in nearby Swanage.

He died in London at age 65 and a memorial exhibition was held at the Fine Art Society in the same year. There is a memorial to him in the north vestibule of St James's Church, Piccadilly.

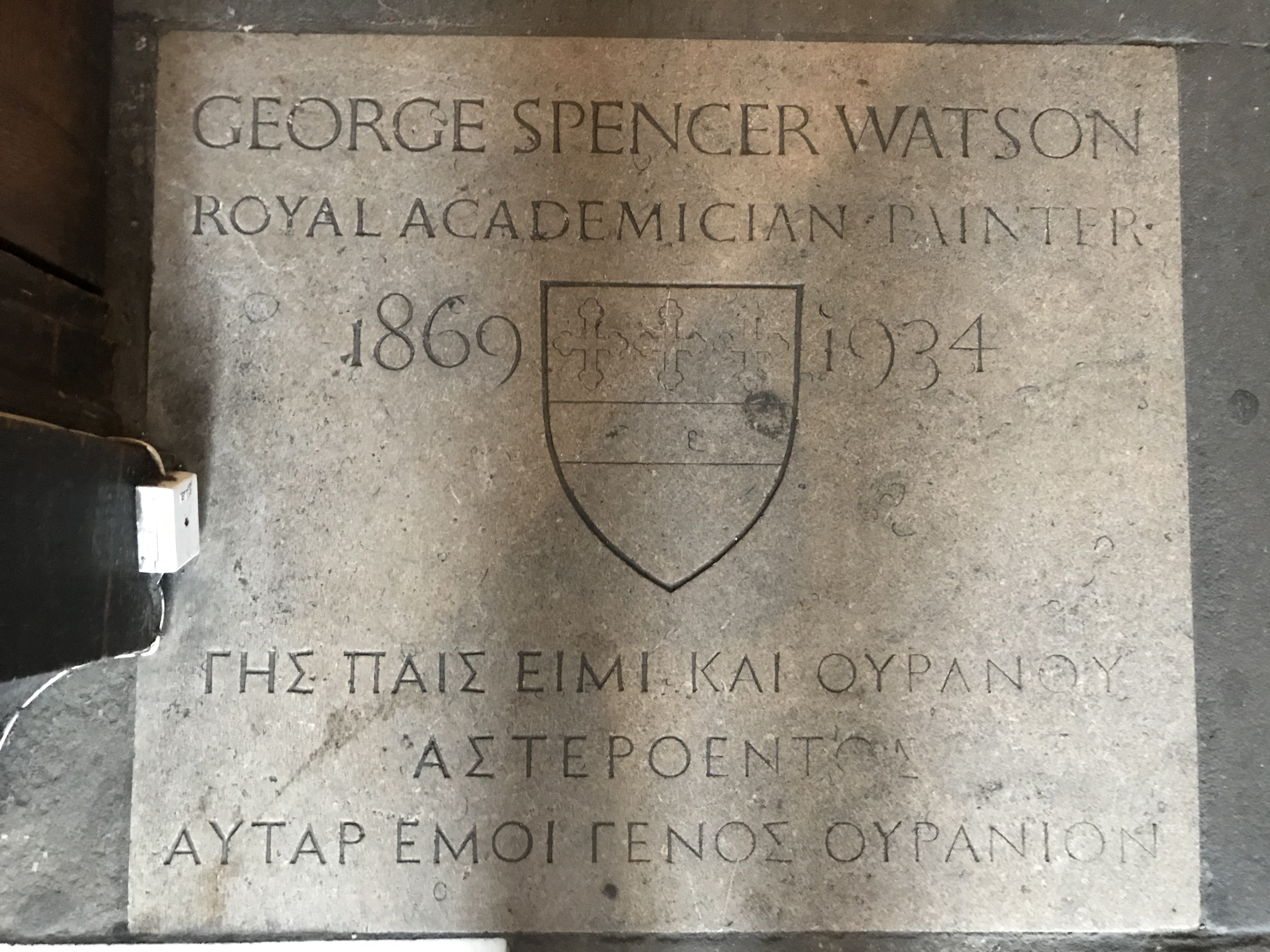
A memorial to George Spencer Watson in St James's Church, Piccadilly.

== Works ==
Some of his works are held at Tate Britain, the Harris Art Gallery, Preston and collections in Bournemouth, Liverpool, Plymouth and the National Gallery of Canada. Born in London, Watson studied at the Royal Academy from 1889; he exhibited there from 1891 and also at the Paris Salon. Retrospective exhibitions were held at the Galerie Heinemann, Munich in 1912, and at the Fine Art Society in 1914. His work A Lady in Black (1922) is owned by the Tate Collection.

- Cynthia - circa 1932
- A Cottage Garden - 1928 (view of Dunshay)
- The Adoration - 19??
- The Creation -1921 -Wolverhampton Art Gallery, West Midlands, UK
- The Birth of Venus - 1933 - Russell-Cotes Art Gallery and Museum, Bournemouth, UK
- Peter and the bear -1915
- Portrait of Monica Boyd - 1909
- Portrait of Esther Harris - 1904
- Portrait of James Harris (accountant) and his dog
- Dorothy Mulloch 1919
- The Fountain - 1900
- Sir Francis Eden Lacey, as Secretary of the MCC, 1928.
- Girl in a Feathered Hat
- Marishka - nude
- The Three Wise Kings - held by Rochdale Art Gallery, Lancashire, UK
- Nude 1927 - Harris Museum and Art Gallery, Preston, Lancashire, UK, purchase for £300 by Preston Town Council 1927
- Mary, 1932 Oil on canvas, of his daughter [Mary Spencer Watson] held by the Royal Academy
- My lady of the rose
- Miss Beaton, 1934, 'Baba' Beaton, (Mrs. Alec Hambro)
- George Elkington Past Master Quatuor Coronati Lodge (2076)
- Sir Montague Sharpe - Middlesex Guildhall Collection
- Four Loves I found, a Woman, a Child, a Horse and a Hound - 1922
- A picnic at Portofino, 1911
- The Saddler's Daughter (Mary Spencer Watson)
- The orange dress, 1926

== Gallery ==
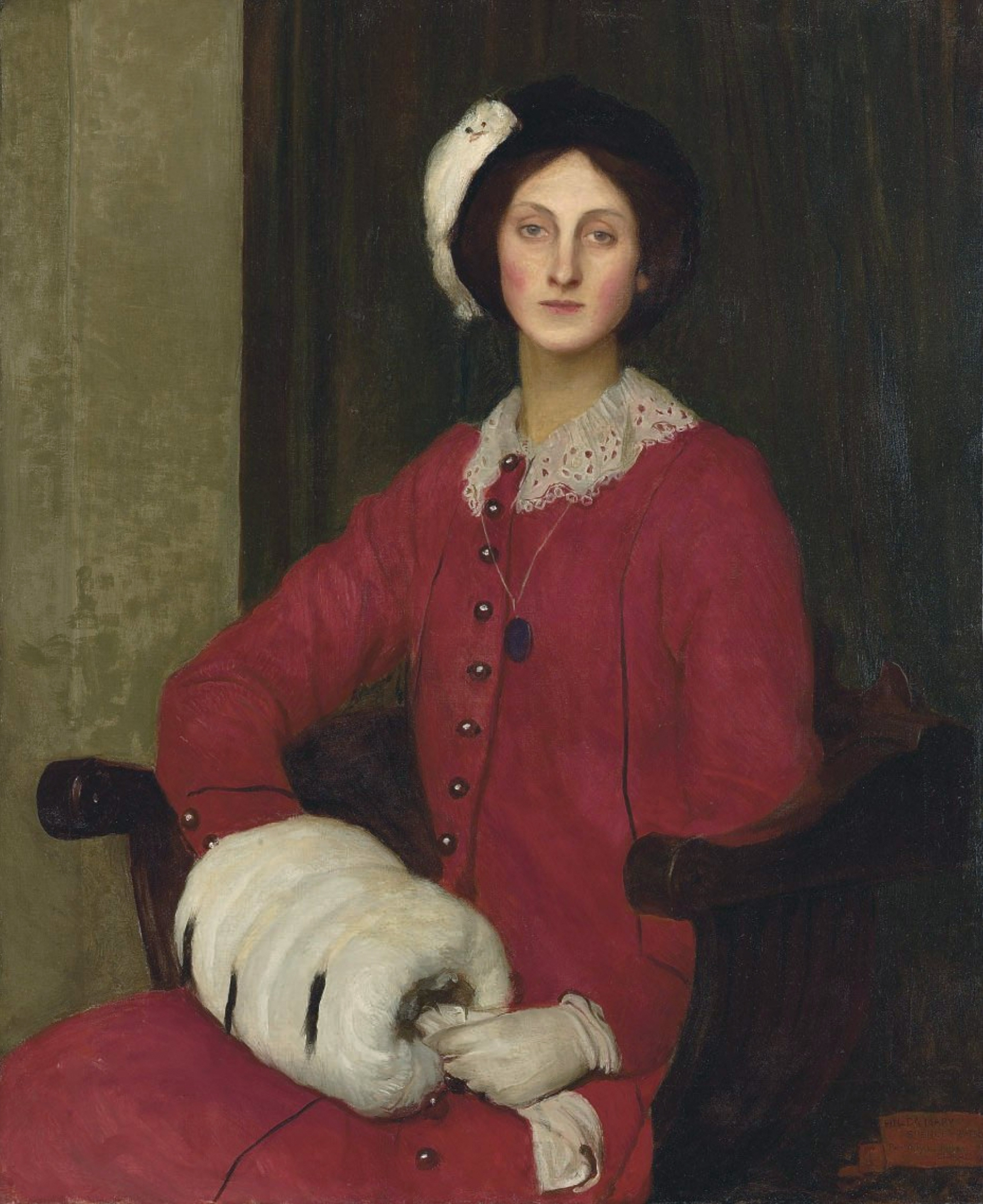
Portrait of Hilda Spencer Watson, c. 1902

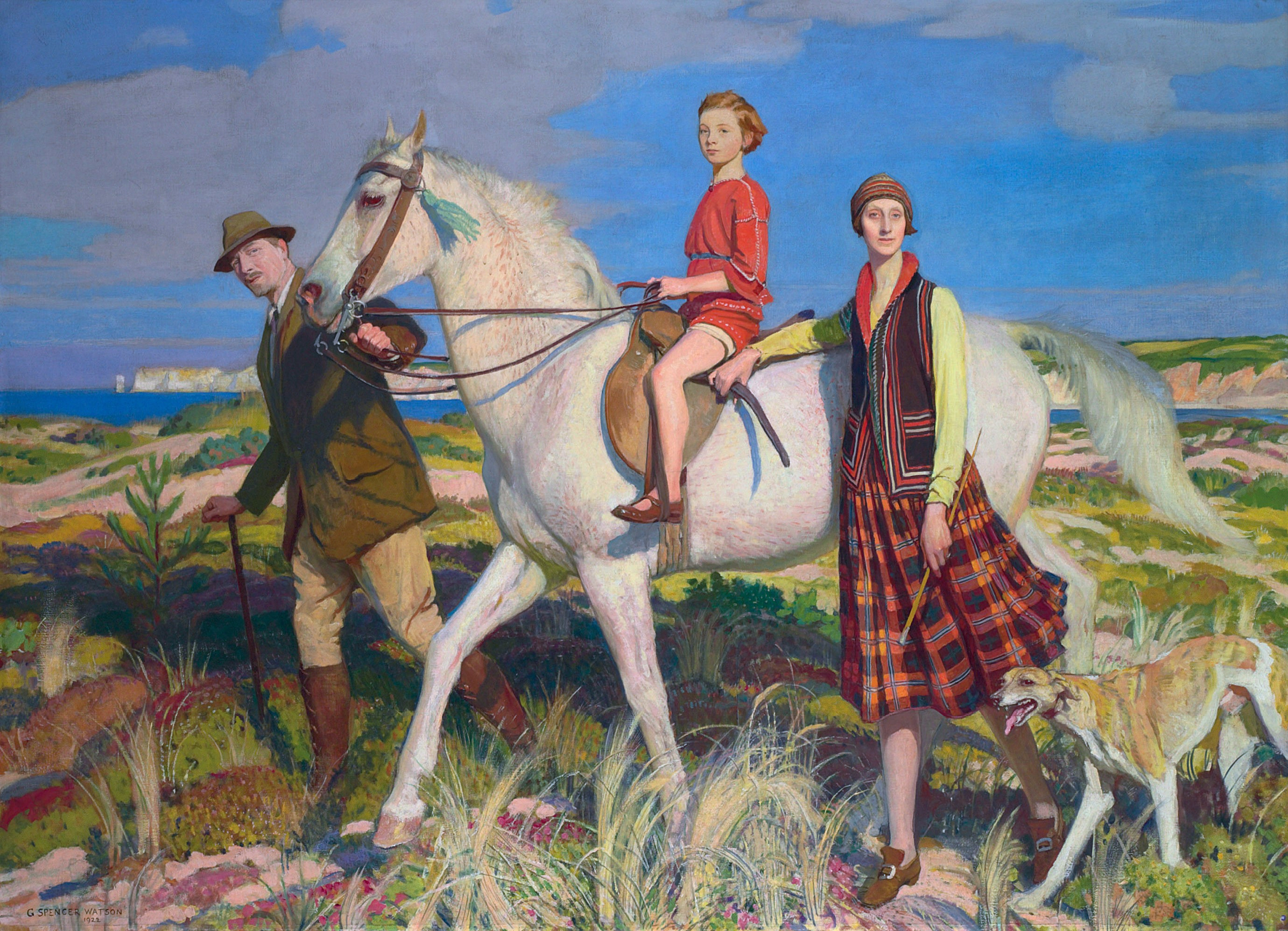
Four Loves I found, a Woman, a Child, a Horse and a Hound, 1922

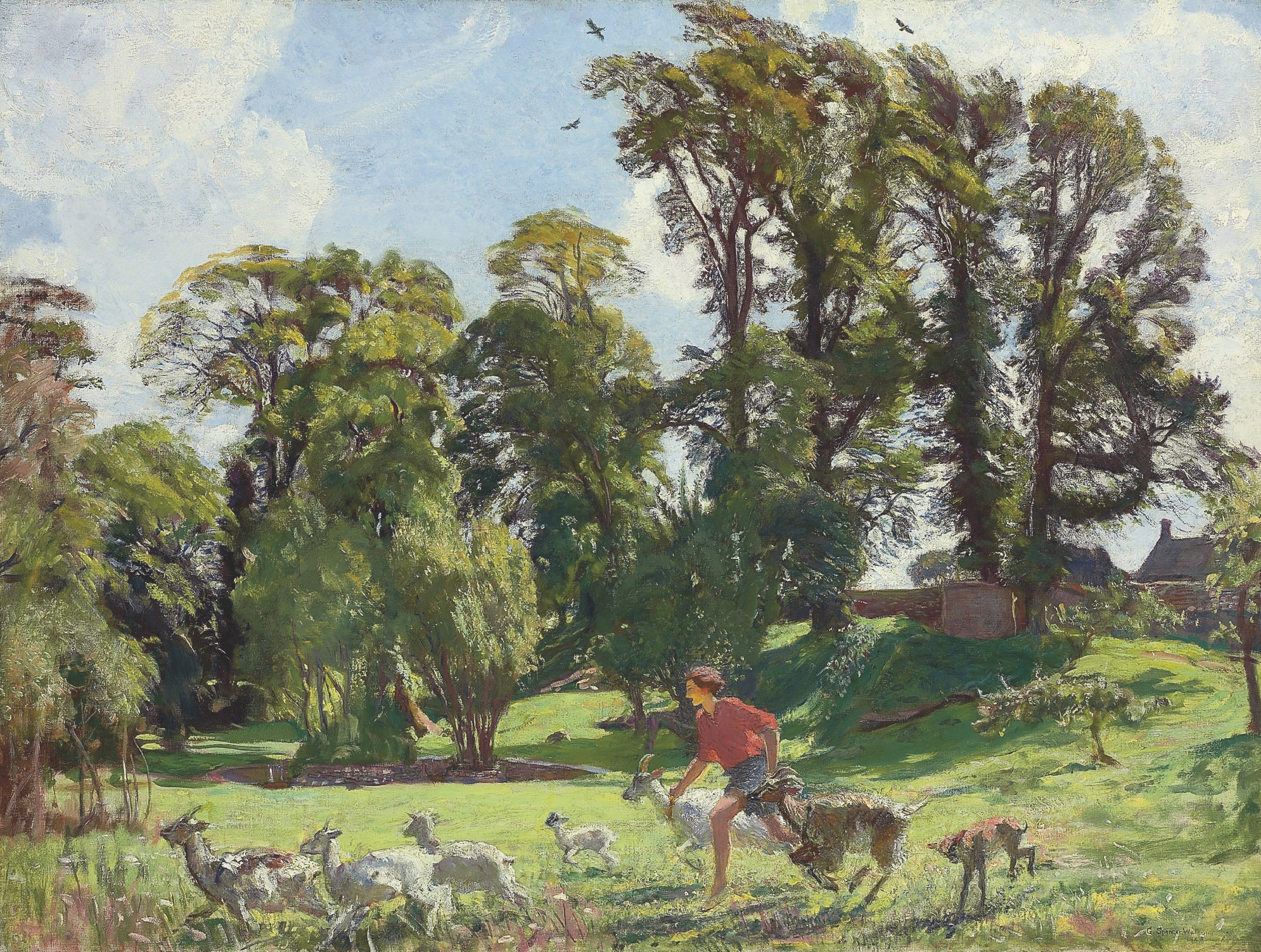
Mary in the gardens, Dunshay (Drat them Goats!), 1926

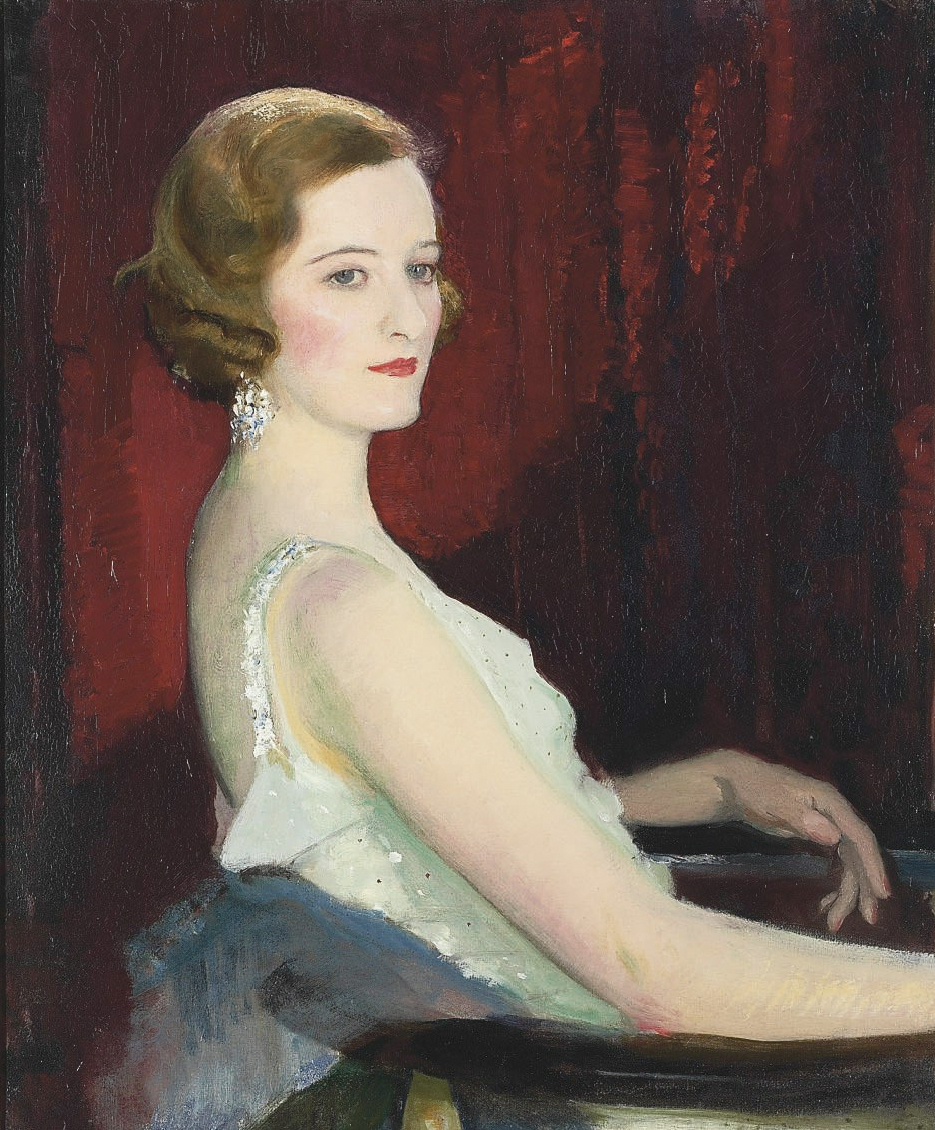
Portrait of Miss Beaton

== See also ==
- Royal Academy
