= Dennis Huntley =

British artist (1928–2021)

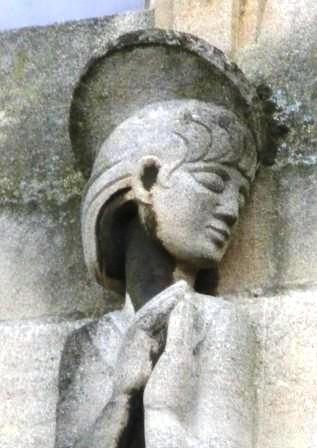
- "Piety" at Guildford Cathedral
- Born: 6 December 1928; Weybridge, Surrey, England
- Died: 2 December 2021 (aged 92); Sutton, Surrey, England
- Education: Wimbledon School of Art, The Royal College of Art

Dennis Huntley (6 December 1928 – 2 December 2021) was a British sculptor, furniture designer and author. A Fellow of the Royal British Society of Sculptors, he completed works for cathedrals, individual collectors and other organisations. Among his most notable works are his sculptures for Guildford Cathedral.

== Life and career ==
Dennis Huntley was born in Weybridge, Surrey, England on 6 December 1928. He studied at Wimbledon School of Art before attending London University.

Besides Huntley's work for Guildford Cathedral, his work, The Scholar, at the former Henry Thornton School in Clapham, London is also notable. His furniture was featured in an exhibition by the Crafts Council.

For several years, he was the Head of the Sir John Cass School of Art in Whitechapel. In 1970 he became a Fellow of the Royal British Society of Sculptors. He has broadcast on sculpture for BBC One and Thames Television and authored the book Modelling and Sculpture in 1976, which has been published by Hamlyn in London, New York, Sydney and Toronto.

In 1967, Huntley's statue of Anne Boleyn was awarded the Sir Otto Beit Medal for the best sculpture outside London anywhere in Britain or the Commonwealth.

Huntley latterly lectured on Comparative Anatomy, Perspective, Aesthetics and Painting and Drawing in all media.

Huntley died on 2 December 2021, at the age of 92.

== Works ==
Huntley's work ranges from figurative to abstract and includes lettering and furniture design. Materials worked include stone, marble, slate, terracotta, iron, lead, zinc, bronze, wood and fibreglass.

His works include:

- Clipsham stone figures for Guildford Cathedral: St Cecilia, Lady Margaret Beaufort, St Hubert, and Piety, as well as two limewood angels for the Children's chapel.
- Six figurative bath stone corbels at St. Mark's Church, Wimbledon: "Angel with Syrinx"; "Christ Turning Out Money Changers"; "Peter and the Tribute Money"; Saint Matthew; Saint John; and Saint Luke.
- Semi-abstract metal figure commissioned by the LCC Patronage of the Arts Scheme for the Henry Thornton Comprehensive School, Clapham London.
- Bronze portrait of Sir Seewoosagur Ramgoolam, Mauritian Prime Minister (won in competition).
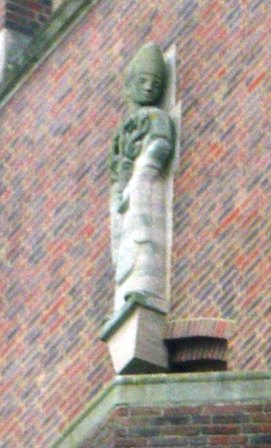
Dennis Huntley's statue of St.Hubert

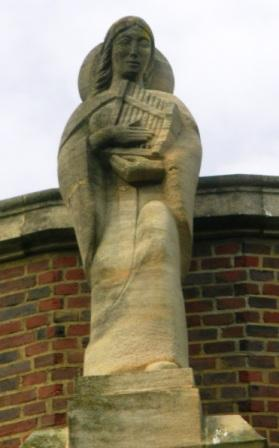
Statue of St Cecilia by Dennis Huntley

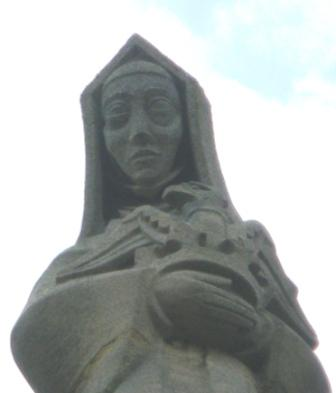
Close-up of Lady Margaret Beaufort by Dennis Huntley

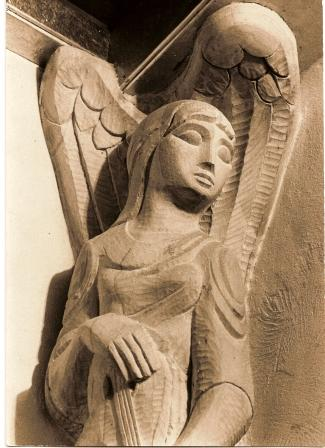
One of the limewood angels at Guildford Cathedral.

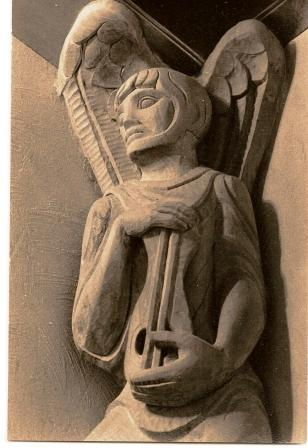
The second limewood angel at Guildford Cathedral.

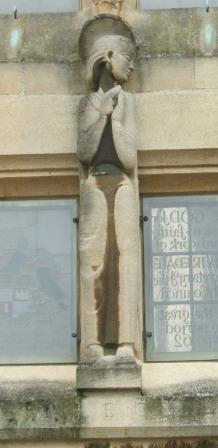
Another view of "Piety"

== See also ==
- Guildford Cathedral
  - exterior sculpture of Guildford Cathedral
