= John Cobbett =

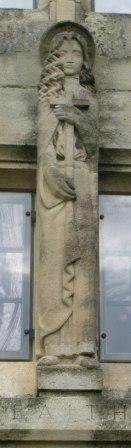
The work "Faith" by John Cobbett

John Cobbett is a sculptor born in Edinburgh in 1929. He was educated at Bournemouth Municipal College, before moving to the Royal Academy Schools.

He created three works for Sir Edward Maufe's Guildford Cathedral; the "Madonna and Child" and "St Francis" statues inside the cathedral, and the work "Faith". The latter was a gift to the cathedral from the Women's Royal Army Corps.
