= Edward Maufe =

English architect and designer (1882–1974)

Maufe, photographed by Howard Coster

Sir Edward Brantwood Maufe, RA, FRIBA (12 December 1882 – 12 December 1974) was an English architect and designer. He built private homes as well as commercial and institutional buildings, and is remembered chiefly for his work on places of worship and memorials. Perhaps his best known buildings are Guildford Cathedral and the Air Forces Memorial. He was a recipient of the Royal Gold Medal for architecture in 1944 and, in 1954, received a knighthood for services to the Imperial War Graves Commission, with which he was associated from 1943 until his death.

== Biography ==
=== Early life and career ===
Maufe was born Edward Muff in Sunny Bank, Ilkley, Yorkshire, on 12 December 1882. He was the second of three children and the youngest son of Henry Muff and Maude Alice Muff née Smithies. His older brother was Herbert Maufe, a geologist.

Henry Muff was a linen draper who was part owner of Brown Muff & Co a department store in Bradford, “the Harrods of the North”. Maude was the niece of Titus Salt, the founder of Saltaire. Maufe started his education at Wharfedale School in Ilkley, and later attended Bradford School.

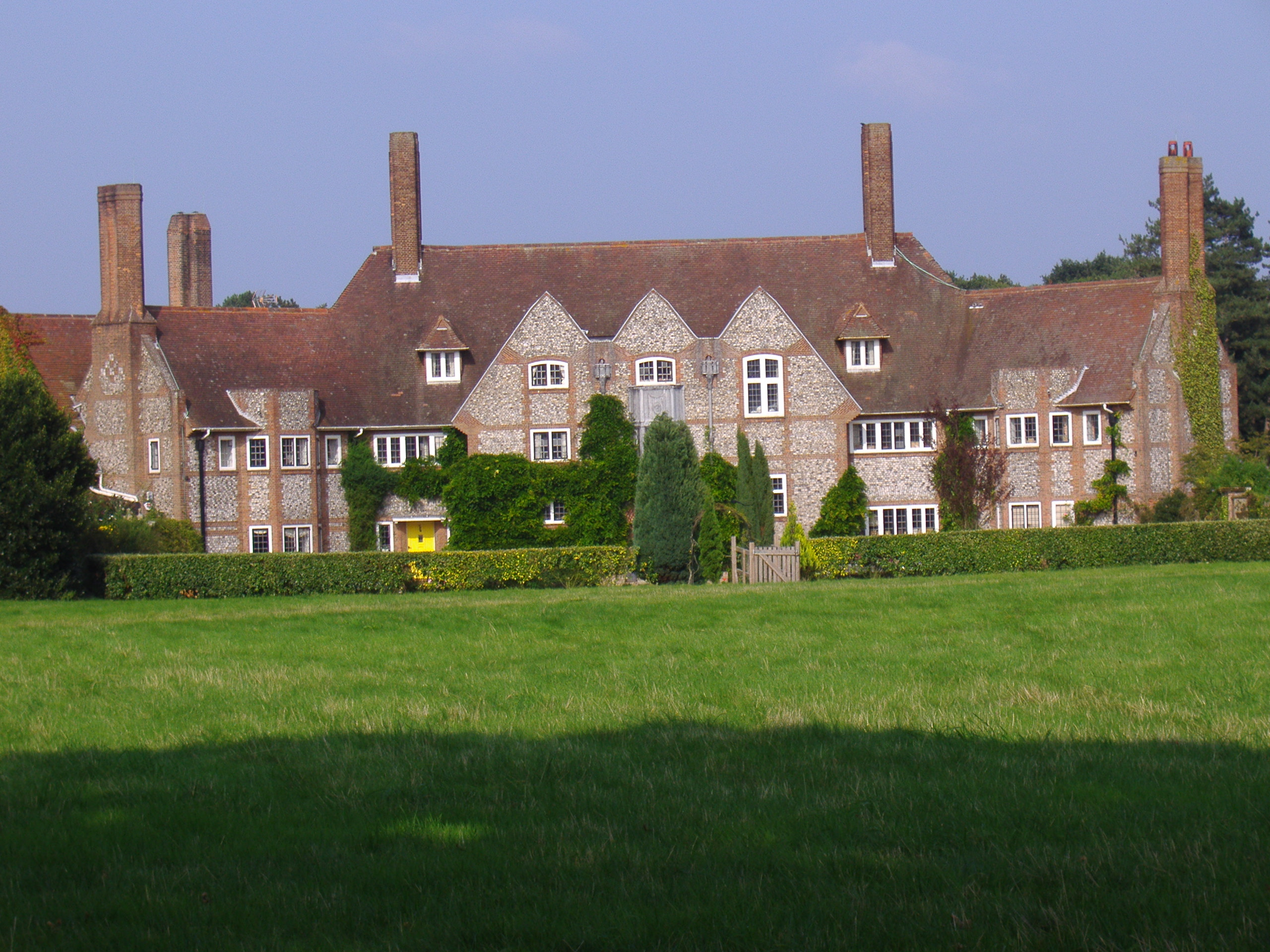
Maufe's first design: Kelling Hall, Norfolk

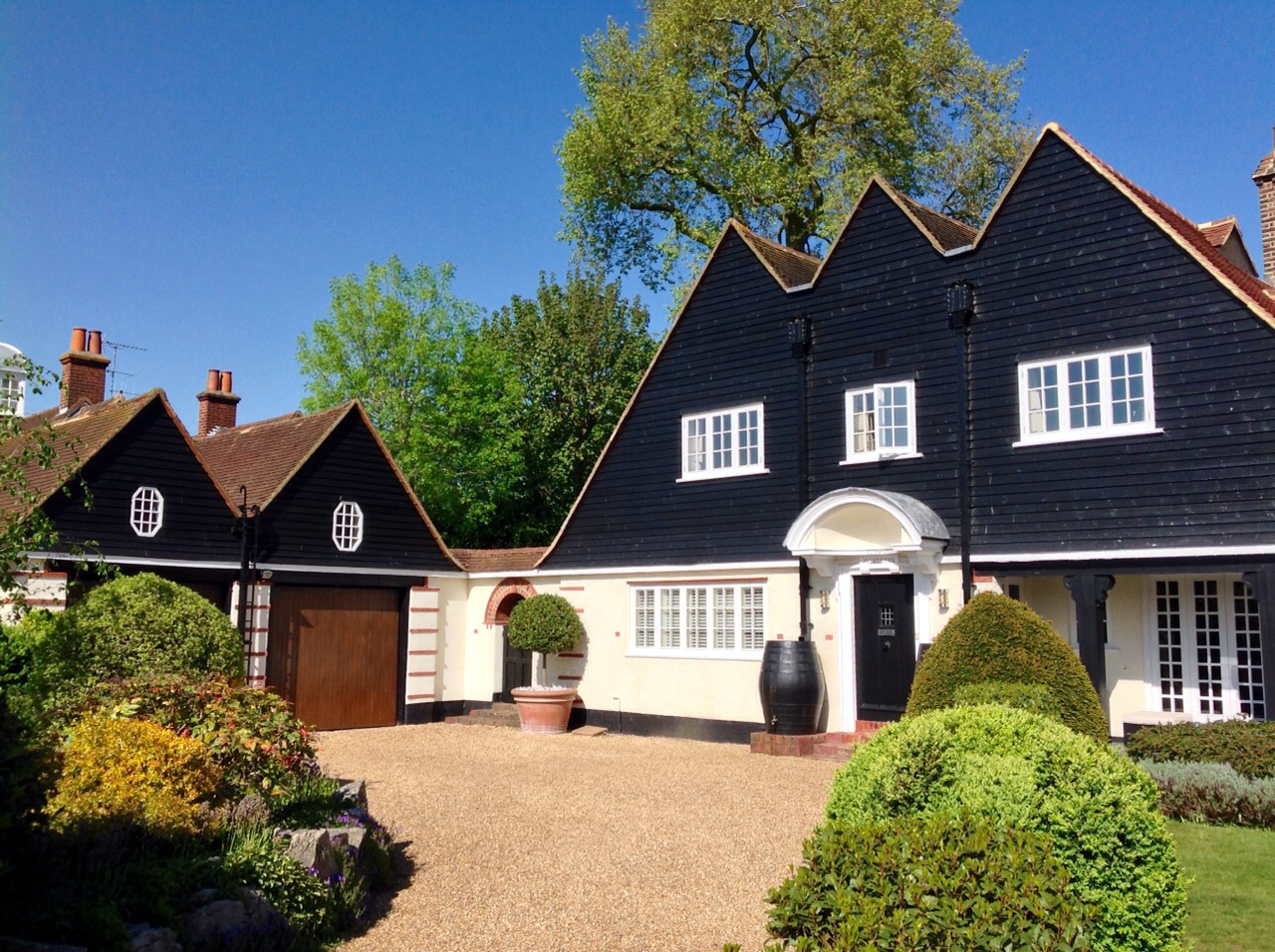
The Barn, Laleham, designed by Edward Maufe in 1909

During his adolescent years, Maufe became interested in architecture. In 1899 he was sent to London to serve a five-year apprenticeship under the direction of the architect William A. Pite, brother of Arthur Beresford Pite. Soon after, the Muff family moved from Yorkshire to Red House in Bexleyheath. The house was designed by Philip Webb for William Morris; Maufe later acknowledged the design as an early architectural influence. After completing his apprenticeship in 1904, Maufe attended St John's College, Oxford, where, in 1908, he received a B.A.; he also studied design at the Architectural Association School of Architecture.

In 1909 the Muff family name was changed by deed poll to Maufe by Henry and his brothers, Charles and Frederick, "for ourselves and our respective issue". The deed poll stated that they were "desirous of reverting to the old form of our surname". The following year Maufe, then aged 28, moved to 139 Old Church Street, Chelsea, London. On 1 October 1910, he married Prudence Stutchbury (1882–1976), the daughter of Edward Stutchbury of the Geological Survey of India. She was an interior designer and later a director of Heal's. They had a son who died in 1968.

During the First World War Maufe served in the Royal Naval Volunteer Reserve, before joining the army in 1917 with Dick Sheppard, who acted as his guarantor. Maufe enlisted in the Royal Garrison Artillery on 9 January 1917, was commissioned as a staff lieutenant that April, and saw action in Salonika. He was discharged on 26 February 1919. Having already been an associate member since 1910, Maufe was elected a fellow of the Royal Institute of British Architects (RIBA) in 1920.

In 1940 Maufe commissioned his portrait, which is now housed at the RIBA. The picture shows him in front of his winning design for Guildford Cathedral from Gluck, whose studio in Hampstead he had designed in 1932.

Another oil portrait of him by John Laviers Wheatley (1892-1955) was exhibited in 1956 and is in the Primary Collection of the National Portrait Gallery, London.

== Architecture ==
Maufe's first important commission after establishing his own practice was in 1912, the design of Kelling Hall, Norfolk, for Sir Henry Deterding. The building shows Maufe's early links with the arts and crafts movement due to its butterfly plan, knapped flint walls, and a grey tiled and gabled roof. Maufe's other pre-war work included the decoration of St Martin-in-the-Fields, the chapels and alterations at All Saints' Church, Southampton (destroyed in the Southampton Blitz in 1940), and restoration at St John's, Hackney, which first brought him into notice in church circles.

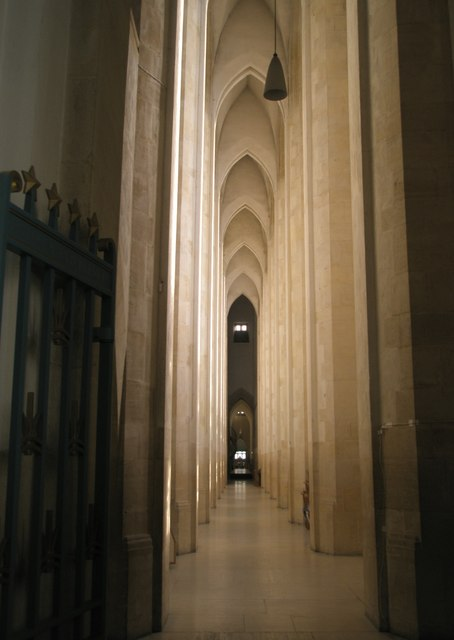
Interior of Guildford Cathedral

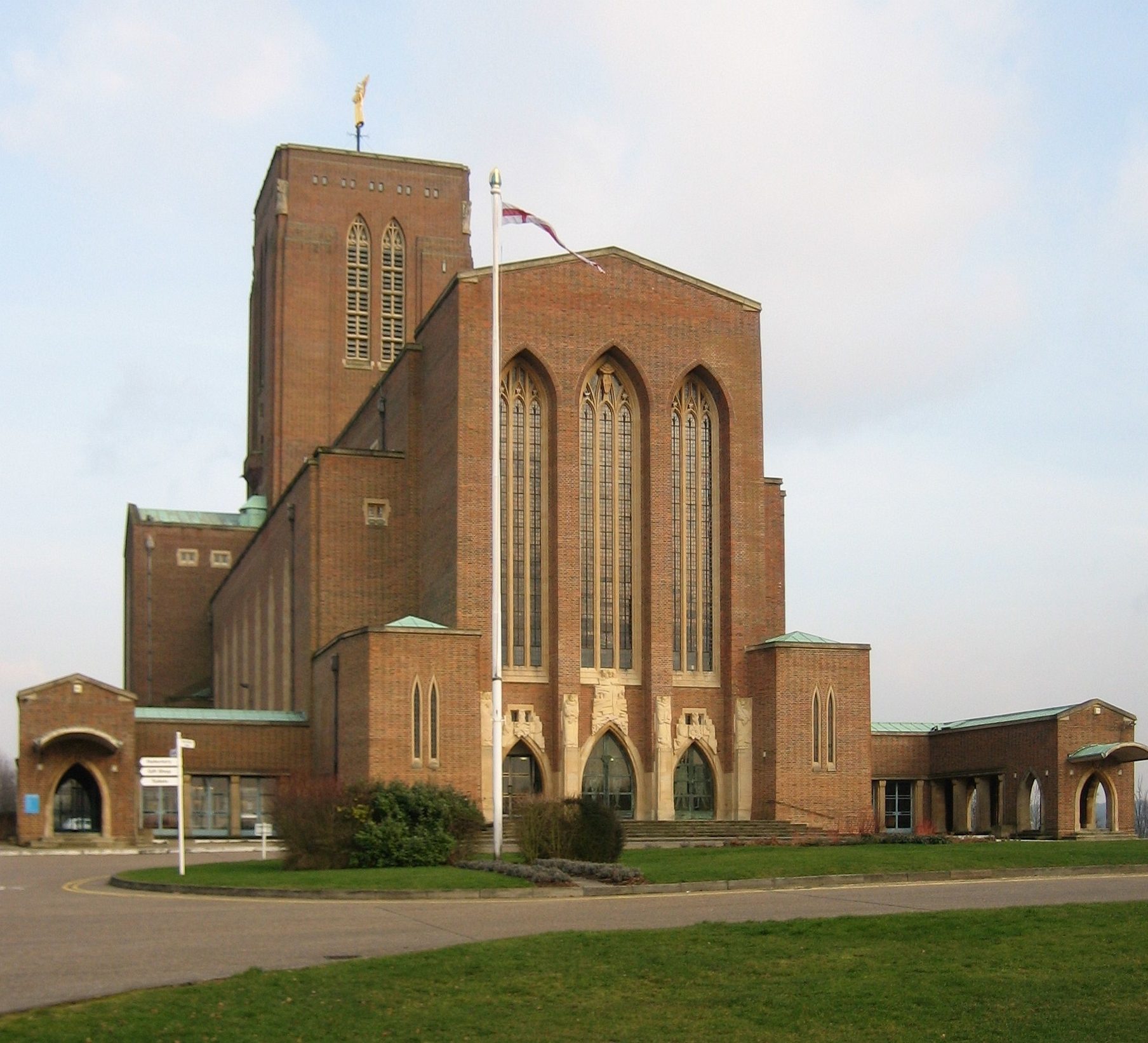
Exterior of Guildford Cathedral

Whilst Kelling Hall was Maufe's first major project. Prior to this in 1909 he was commissioned by Marie Studholme (the Edwardian Music Hall Star) to design a weekend house on the banks of the River Thames in Laleham, Middlesex. The house, known as The Barn, was heavily influenced by Edwin Lutyens's Homewood (1901), in particular the triple gabled roof, a device he used at Kelling Hall as well.

His 1924 proposals for the Palace of Industry at the British Empire Exhibition, Wembley attracted notice though an alternative design was built. Maufe was a silver medallist at the Paris Exhibition in 1925 which resulted in him securing a wide variety of commissions. The church of St Bede Clapham (1922) and St Saviour's in Acton (1924), were built for the Royal Association in Aid of the Deaf and Dumb and made. The latter church displays a simple structure and has a likeness to contemporary Swedish architecture. St Saviour's was loosely based on the design by Ivar Tengbom of Högalid Church in Stockholm, which Maufe described as being the most completely satisfying modern Swedish building he had seen. During this period, Maufe was a constant champion of modern Swedish architecture, and was often vocal on this theme in the architectural press, citing his own buildings as having simplified elevations, painted ceilings, and applied sculpture, similar to those found in Sweden. Maufe felt that Swedish architecture had a combined freshness without obviously breaking with tradition.

In 1932, Maufe won a competition to design the Guildford Cathedral, coming first among 183 entries with a Gothic design in concrete faced in brick. By the time the building was dedicated in 1961, it seemed even more of an anachronism. The cathedral's exterior including the nave and aisles together with Maufe's use of space, won him general admiration amongst fellow architects. As a result, he was described as a designer of churches by conviction, as he attempted to produce buildings of austere simplicity aiming directly at the creation of a religious atmosphere. At Guildford, he wanted to produce a design of the times, yet to keep in line with the great English cathedrals already established within the United Kingdom.

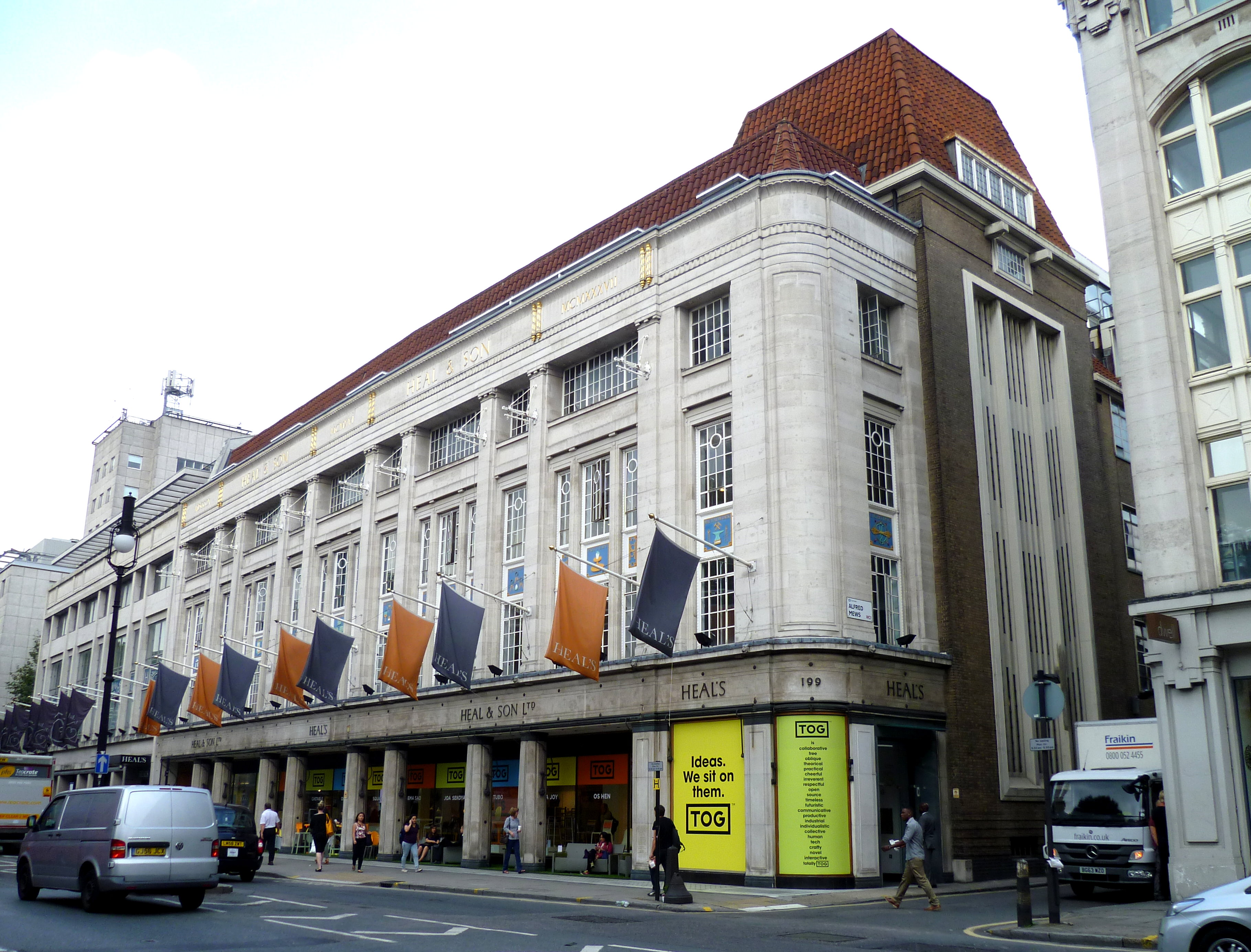
Heal and Son Ltd., Tottenham Court Road.

In 1936, King George VI commissioned Maufe to conduct various alterations to the Royal Chapel of All Saints in Windsor Great Park. The small private chapel stands in the grounds of Royal Lodge which was the Queen Mother's residence. Maufe designed a new ceiling for the chancel and a royal pew, new choir stalls and a casing for a new organ. In 1937, Maufe designed the extension to Heal's furniture store in Tottenham Court Road, where his wife Prudence worked, with his design including a full length Lenscrete Window inspired by his design for Guildford Cathedral. In 1944, he was awarded the Royal Gold Medal for architecture.

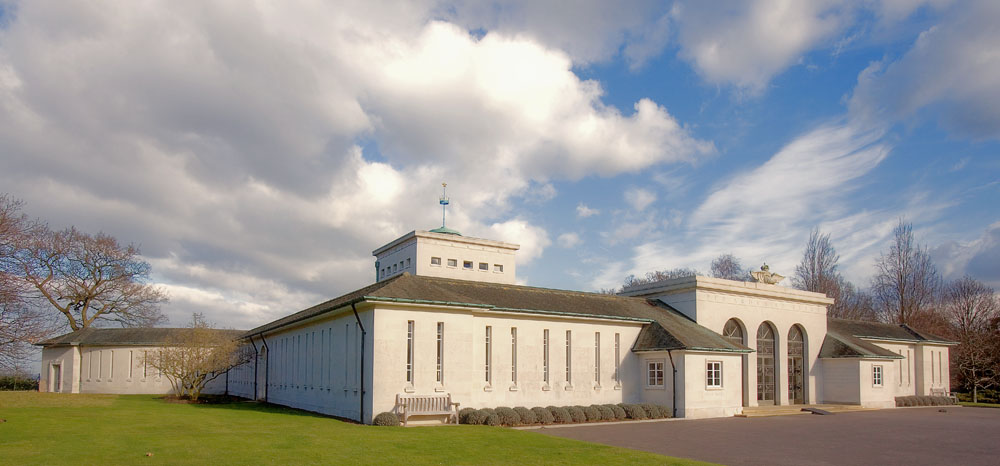
Exterior of The Air Forces Memorial in Egham, Surrey

From 1943, Maufe was principal architect UK to the Imperial War Graves Commission, eventually becoming chief architect and artistic adviser until 1969. Among his war memorial designs are those at Tower Hill which was an expansion to the already established memorial by Sir Edward Lutyens and the Air Forces Memorial at Cooper's Hill overlooking Runnymede (1950–53). Maufe's domestic work had a stylish modernity, in direct contrast with the new functionalism. In the architectural language of the time it was called ‘modernity with manners’ and very much reflected the established taste of the inter-war period. Maufe often wrote and lectured on architecture chiefly on furnishing within the home and on present-day architecture. His designs were considered by interior designers to be modern and stylish, with built-in fitments and pastel colour-schemes, particularly pink, mauve, and cream, contrasted with silver-lacquered furniture and mirrors. One of his house designs was Yaffle Hill, Broadstone, Dorset, built in 1929 for Cyril Carter of Poole Pottery. Other schemes included an extension to Baylins, Beaconsfield in 1927, for Ambrose Heal, Gluck's studio in Bolton Hill, Hampstead (1932), and the studio for religious services at Broadcasting House (1931). He also designed several branch banks for Lloyds Bank, including 50 Notting Hill Gate, London in 1930.

Other works include the Festival Theatre in Cambridge, St Thomas the Apostle in Hanwell, London and the Oxford Playhouse and St Columba's Church (Pont Street, London SW1). He designed buildings for Trinity and St John's College, Cambridge, Balliol and St John's College, Oxford (of which he was made an honorary fellow of in 1943). Maufe was later commissioned to re-design the war-damaged Middle Temple, Inner Temple and Gray's Inn, which made him an Honorary Master of the Bench in 1951.

Architectural historian Ian Nairn said that "Maufe is the rare case of a man with genuine spatial gifts but out of sympathy with the style of his time".

=== Retirement and death ===
Maufe retired in 1964 to Shepherd's Hill, Buxted, East Sussex, which he had restored as his second home in the late 1920s. He died aged 92 on his birthday, 12 December 1974, in nearby Uckfield Hospital. His architectural drawings and correspondence were deposited at the RIBA upon his death.

== Partial list of works ==
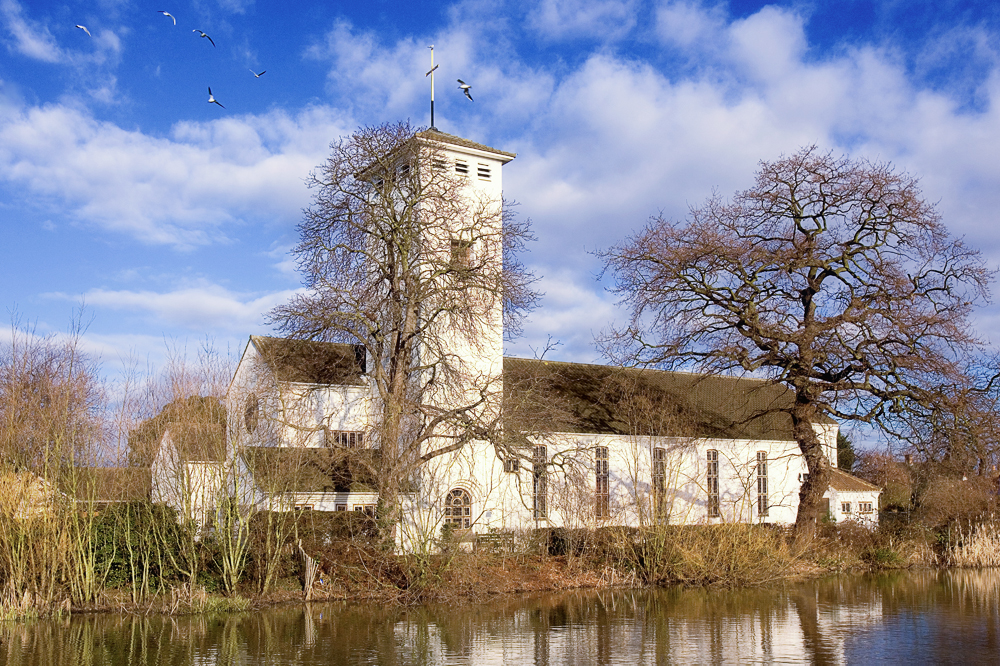
All Saints Weston, Esher, Surrey

- The Barn, Laleham, Middlesex (1909)
- Kelling Hall, Norfolk (1912)
- St Bede's, Clapham Road, London SW9 (1924)
- Palace of Industry at the British Empire Exhibition, Wembley (1924–25)
- Lloyds Bank, Wren Road, Camberwell (1925)
- Festival Theatre, Cambridge, (1926) (alterations only)
- St Saviour's, Old Oak Lane, Acton London, (1926)
- Trinity College, Cambridge (1927)
- Yaffle Hill, Broadstone, Dorset
- Tower at St Mary's, Liss, Hampshire (1930)
- Lloyds Bank, 50 Notting Hill Gate, London (1930)
- St John's Church, Hook, Hampshire (1931)
- Guildford Cathedral (1932)
- Studio for Religious Services, Broadcasting House, Portland Place (1932)
- Rawlinson Building extension, St John's College, Oxford (1933)
- St Thomas the Apostle, Boston Road, Hanwell, London (1934)
- The House, Round Island, Poole Harbour (c1935)
- Alterations to Royal Chapel of All Saints in Windsor Great Park (1936) – a new ceiling for the chancel and a royal pew, new choir stalls and a casing for a new organ
- Extension to Morley College, London SE1 (1937)
- St John's College, Cambridge Chapel Court and North Court (1938–40)
- The Oxford Playhouse, Oxford (1938)
- Heal's Department Store in Tottenham Court Road, London (1938) (southern extension)

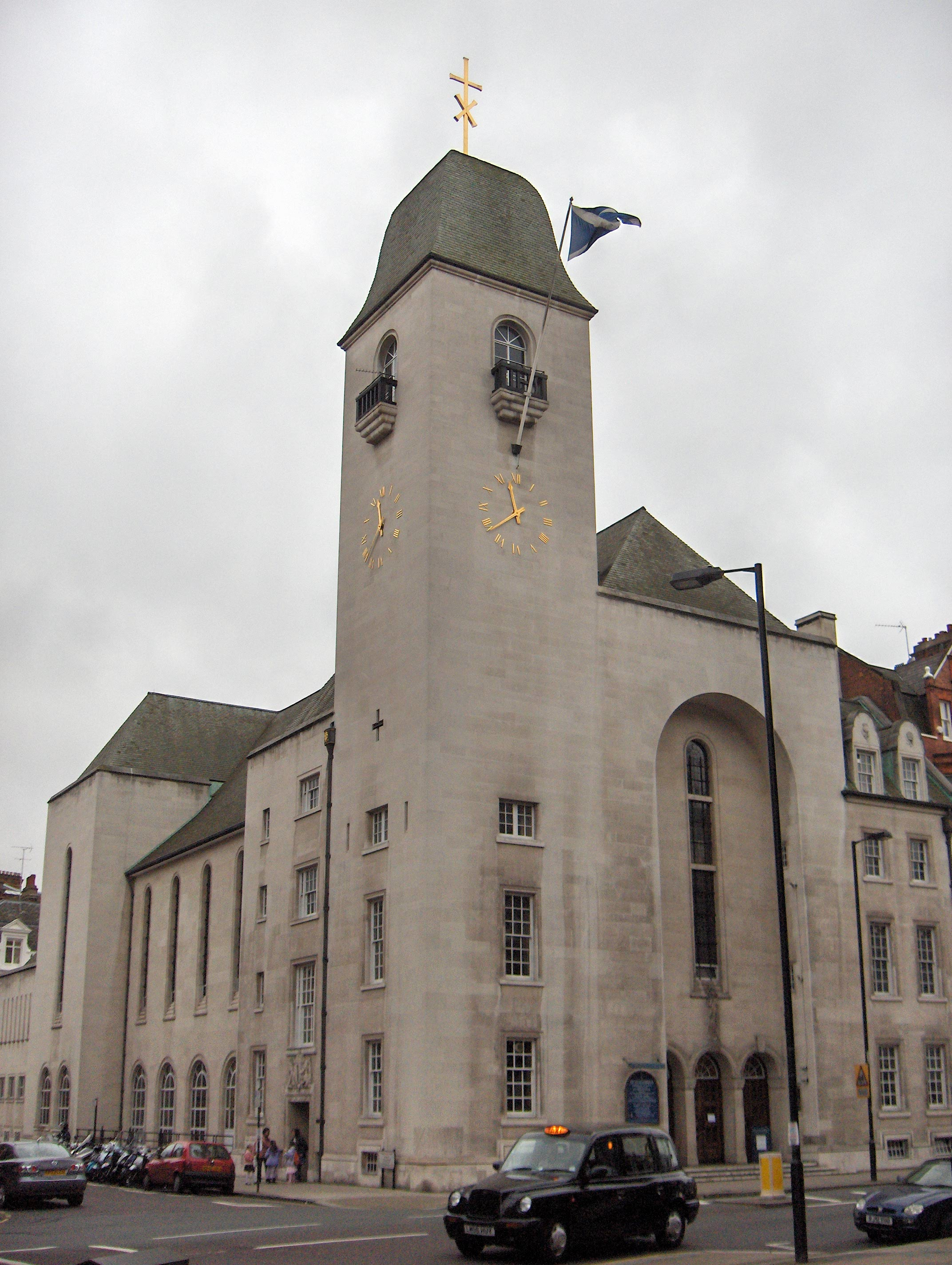
St Columba's Church, Pont St, London

- Bishop Hannington Memorial Church, Hove (1938)
- St Andrew's United Reformed Church, Cheam (1939)
- St George's Church, Goodrington, Paignton (1939)
- All Saints Weston, Chestnut Avenue, Esher, Surrey (1939)
- Walworth Methodist Chapel Clubland (1939)
- Northumberland Chapel, St Peter and St Paul Church, Albury, Surrey (1939)
- Chatham Naval Memorial, Chatham, Kent (1945) (extension only)
- Plymouth Naval Memorial, Plymouth, Devon (1945) (extension only)
- The RAF Shelter, Brookwood Cemetery, Surrey (1947)
- Dolphin Quad, St John's College, Oxford (1947)
- Dulwich Picture Gallery post-war restoration (1947–53)
- Commonwealth War Graves Commission cremation memorial, Golders Green Crematorium, London (1949)
- St Mary's Church, Hampden Park, Eastbourne (1952–54)
- Air Forces Memorial, Runnymede, Surrey (1953)
- The Tower Hill Memorial, London (1955) (extension only)
- The Master's House, Temple Church (c1955) (rebuilding following war-time bomb damage, work shared with Sir Hubert Worthington)
- St Columba's Church, London, Pont Street, London SW1 (1955)
- Crown Row Building, Inner Temple (1955) (rebuilding following wartime bomb damage)
- St Mary in the Park, Willingdon near Eastbourne (1956)
- Magna Carta Memorial, Runnymede, Surrey (1957)
- Francis Taylor Building, Inner Temple (1957)
- St Alphege's, Lower Edmonton, London (1958)
- The Chapel at Lewes Priory School Mountfield Road, Lewes (1960)
- Cathedral Church of St Peter, Bradford (1963) (extension)
- St Nicholas' Church, Saltdean (1964)

== See also ==
- Exterior sculpture of Guildford Cathedral

== Bibliography ==
- Nairn, Ian; Pevsner, Nikolaus (1971) [1962]. The Buildings of England: Surrey (2nd ed.). Harmondsworth: Penguin Books. ISBN 0-300-09675-5.
