= Whitworth =

Whitworth may refer to:

== Places ==
=== United Kingdom ===
- Whitworth, County Durham, a former civil parish in England
  - Whitworth Hall, County Durham
- Whitworth, Lancashire, a town in England
- Whitworth Art Gallery, an art gallery in Manchester, England
- Whitworth Gardens, Manchester
- Whitworth Hall, Manchester, part of the University of Manchester
- Whitworth Park, Manchester
- Whitworth Street, Manchester

=== Canada ===
- Whitworth, Quebec, an Indian reserve in Canada

=== Other ===
- Whitworth Ridge, Prince Charles Mountains, Mac. Robertson Land, Antarctica

== People ==
- Whitworth (surname)

== Other uses ==
- Whitworth rifle, a British made rifle used by the Confederacy in the American Civil War
- 70-pounder Whitworth naval gun and 120-pounder Whitworth naval gun, naval guns made on a similar principle
- Baron Whitworth, two titles in the Peerage of Ireland
- Whitworth University, a private, liberal-arts institution in Spokane, Washington
- Whitworth Park Academy, a secondary school in Spennymoor, County Durham, England
- Whitworths, a dried fruit, home baking and snack products company
- British Standard Whitworth (BSW), a specification for screw fasteners
