= Tom McGuinness (artist) =

British coal miner and artist

Tom McGuinness (1926–2006) was a British coal miner and artist. At 18 he was conscripted as a Bevin Boy during World War II, and later studied at the Darlington School of Art, and was one of the artists at the Spennymoor Settlement, where his contemporaries included Norman Cornish, Herbert Dees and Robert Heslop. In 1957 an oil The Miners' Bus was included as one of the 'Young Artists of Promise' in Jack Beddington's book.

In 2018 Frances O'Grady, General Secretary of the Trades Union Congress, exhibited his painting of Murton colliery in County Durham in her office. This is the same county as the other places mentioned (above) in his career.
