= Whitworth, County Durham =

Coordinates: 54.703°N 1.634°W

Whitworth
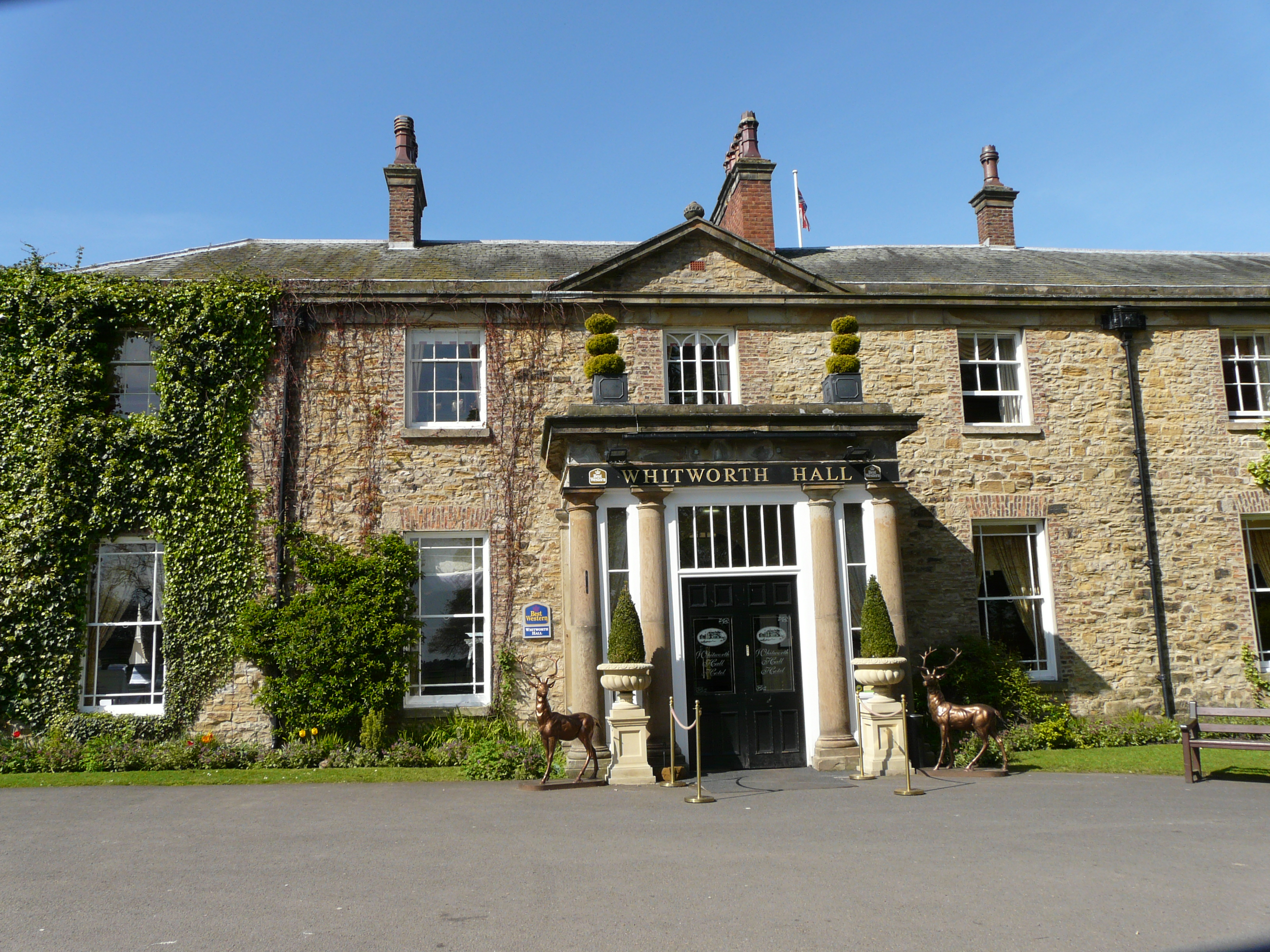
- Whitworth Hall

- Location within County Durham
- Civil parish: Spennymoor
- Unitary authority: County Durham
- Ceremonial county: Durham
- Region: North East
- Country: England
- Sovereign state: United Kingdom
- Police: Durham
- Fire: County Durham and Darlington
- Ambulance: North East

Whitworth is a former civil parish, now in the parish of Spennymoor, in County Durham, England, centred on Whitworth Hall. In 1931 the parish had a population of 6096. It was one of several parishes abolished on 1 April 1937 to create the parish of Spennymoor. Whitworth Hall (now a hotel) is on the road between Spennymoor and Brancepeth, and is close to Tudhoe. The house was in former times the home of the Shafto family, whose most famous member (from the 18th century) was Bobby Shafto, subject of a famous English nursery rhyme.
