= Church of St Philip and St James, Tow Law =

Church in County Durham, England

Coordinates: 54.7453°N 1.8101°W

Church of St Philip and St James
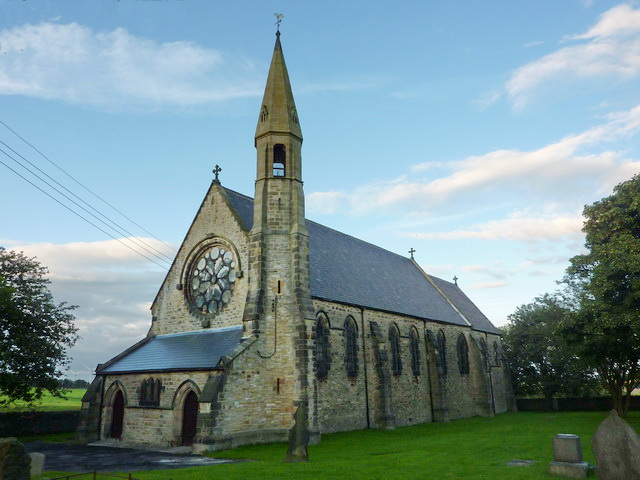
- Church of St Philip and St James
- OS grid reference: NZ 12328 38941
- Address: Church Lane
- Country: England
- Denomination: Anglican

History
- Status: Church
- Dedication: Saints Philip and James
- Consecrated: 24 July 1869

Architecture
- Heritage designation: Grade II listed building
- Designated: 5 June 1987
- Architect: Charles Hodgson Fowler
- Style: Gothic Revival
- Completed: 1869

Specifications
- Materials: Sandstone

Administration
- Diocese: Durham
- Parish: Tow Law

The Church of St Philip and St James is a church in Tow Law, County Durham, England. The church was designed by architect Charles Hodgson Fowler (1840-1910) and completed in 1869. Built of sandstone, the decorated church features a south-west tower. It became a Grade II listed building on 5 June 1987.

The church is administered as one of The Four Parishes - including St Mary & St Stephen Wolsingham, St Bartholomew Thornley Village and St.Cuthbert Satley.

== Notable people ==
The vicar of Tow Law from 1862 to 1888 was the Revd Michael Henry Simpson. Simpson's youngest daughter, Alice Pickering (1860–1939), was a tennis player who played twice in the Wimbledon Championship Final.

Another of Michael Henry Simpson's daughters, Florence Eva Simpson (1865–1923), known as Elva Lorence, became a published writer and composer, as well as a painter.

A third sister, Katherine Ashton Simpson (1858–1951), known as Kate A. Pearce Simpson, was a writer of books and musicals and poetry. She was also an artist, whose work was hung in the Royal Scottish Academy, at the Berwick Exhibition in Newcastle-on-Tyne. Her painting of her sister, Florence Eva Simpson, is part of the collection of Touchstones Rochdale gallery, run by Rochdale Arts & Heritage Service.
