= Norman Cornish =

British artist (1919–2014)

- "Berriman's Chip Van" by Norman Cornish
- Born: 18 November 1919
- Died: 1 August 2014 (aged 94)
- Occupation: Artist
- Spouse: Sarah
- Children: 2

Norman Stansfield Cornish (18 November 1919 – 1 August 2014) was an English miner and an artist, particularly in the field of painting, focusing on mining life and community.

== Biography ==
Norman Cornish was born in 1919 in Spennymoor, (later to house the Spennymoor Settlement) in County Durham in North East England. He started work as a miner in 1933, at the age of 14, and continued to work as a miner after his painting career was established, until he retired to become a full-time artist in 1966.

Married to Sarah, the couple had two children, John and Ann. Cornish died in 2014.

== Career ==
Cornish joined the "Pitman's Academy" art school, in the Spennymoor Settlement, at the age of 15, becoming known as a "pit painter", and was the last surviving member of the Spennymoor institute. A former miner, he was known for his pictures of mining community life. Other artistic contemporaries of Cornish from the Spennymoor Settlement included Herbert Dees, Robert Heslop and Tom McGuinness.

Cornish was granted an honorary Master of Arts degree by Newcastle University in 1974, and an honorary doctorate by Sunderland University in 2012. He was a contemporary and friend of the artist L. S. Lowry.

== Artworks ==
Cornish's 22 in × 29 in (560 mm × 740 mm) painting, Bar Scene, was found to contain a self-portrait of the artist on the enclosed back side of the canvas in 2024. Potentially unknown for 60 years, the self-portrait is the 29th known of Cornish.

The largest collection of Cornish's work is held by Northumbria University, with the oldest painting, Colliery Row, dating to 1947. A mural showing the Durham Miners Gala is in Bishop Auckland Town Hall. It was originally displayed in County Hall, Durham, but the building is scheduled for demolition.

== Legacy ==
To mark the 100th anniversary of Cornish's birth, the Bowes Museum organised the first "major retrospective" of Cornish's work. The exhibition was scheduled to run from November 2019 to February 2020. An exhibition of some of Cornish's 269 sketchbooks was scheduled for display over the same period at Durham University's Palace Green Library.

In 2019, a 'Norman Cornish Trail' was created in Spennymoor to allow people to follow a 1.5 mile route to view many of the scenes painted by Cornish.

A room within the art gallery at Spennymoor Town Hall has been dedicated to exhibiting paintings by Cornish.
