= Spennymoor Town Hall =

Municipal building in Spennymoor, County Durham, England

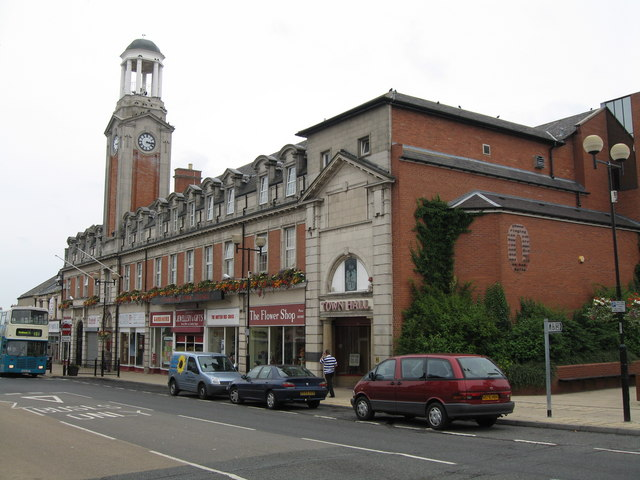
- Spennymoor Town Hall

- Shown in County Durham
- 54.6984°N 1.6028°W
- Location: High Street, Spennymoor

History
- Built: 1916

Site notes
- Architect: G. T. Wellburn
- Architectural style: Edwardian Baroque style

Spennymoor Town Hall is a municipal building in Spennymoor, County Durham, England. The town hall is the meeting place of Spennymoor Town Council.

== History ==
After population growth associated with the increasing number of coal mines in the town, the local board of health, which had been formed in 1864, established its offices in a market hall which was built in the High Street and completed in 1870. The market hall was a single storey structure with a small central tower with a pyramid-style roof. After the formation of Spennymoor Urban District Council in 1894, civic leaders decided to demolish the building and to erect a more substantial structure on the same site.

Construction of the new building began in 1913; the architect was G. T. Wellburn and the contractor J. Miller of South Shields. The new building included the Town Hall itself (a public hall measuring 84 ft (26 m) by 40 ft (12 m) and designed to seat 850 people) along with municipal offices and an adjacent market hall, measuring 141 ft (43 m) by 39 ft (12 m) (since demolished). It was designed in the Edwardian Baroque style, was built in red brick with stone dressings at a cost of £18,000 and was completed in 1916. The design involved an asymmetrical main frontage with fifteen bays facing onto the High Street. The second/third bay from the left had a rusticated arch which originally led to the market hall beyond. The fifth bay from the left, which slightly projected forward and was faced in stone, featured a doorway on the ground floor with the town's coat of arms in the tympanum, a tall window on the first floor and a clock tower with a roof lantern above. The final bay, pedimented and faced entirely in stone, was the entrance to the public hall. The other bays featured shops on the ground floor, baroque style windows on the first floor and pedimented baroque style windows at attic level. Internally, other than the hall, the principal room was a circular and domed council chamber, which was panelled.

The building continued to serve as a meeting place for Spennymoor Urban District Council for much of the 20th century but ceased to be the local seat of government after the enlarged Sedgefield District Council was formed in 1974. The town hall was refurbished in 1990 and continued to be used by Spennymoor Town Council as their meeting place.

The Durham Miners Museum, which was formed when a group of former miners started exhibiting their collection of artefacts in 1999 and which had been based in a small room at Thornley Community Centre since 2005, relocated to more substantial facilities in the town hall in October 2011. A simulation of a typical mine tunnel, which could be explored by visitors, was put on display in the museum April 2014.

With financial support from the Spennymoor Area Action Partnership, part of the first floor of the town hall was converted for use as an art gallery in 2011. The gallery was named the Bob Abley Art Gallery, in March 2014, after a former teacher and curator, Bob Abley, who helped establish the gallery. A room within the gallery was subsequently dedicated to exhibiting paintings by the locally-born artist and former miner, Norman Cornish.
