= Florence Eva Simpson =

British composer and writer

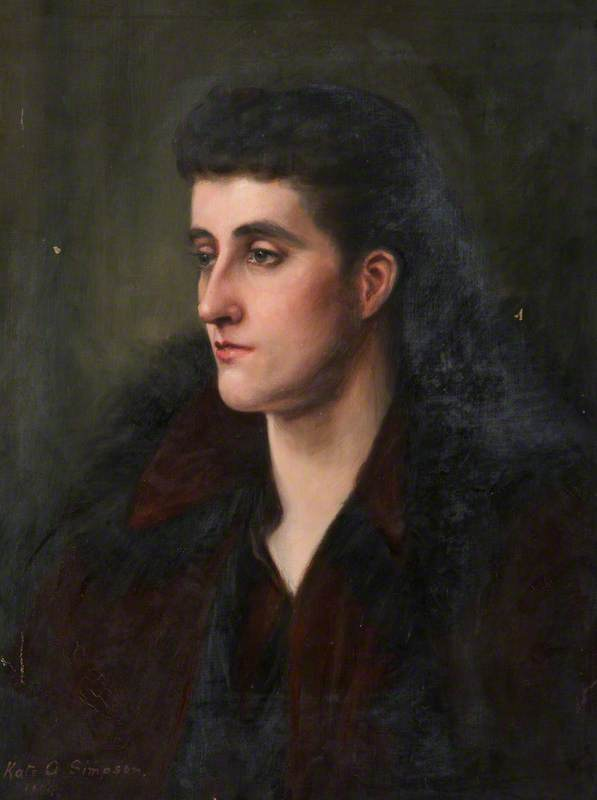
Florence Eva Simpson, better known as Elva Lorennce, painted by her sister Katherine Ashton Simpson in 1894. Part of the collection of Touchstones Rochdale gallery.

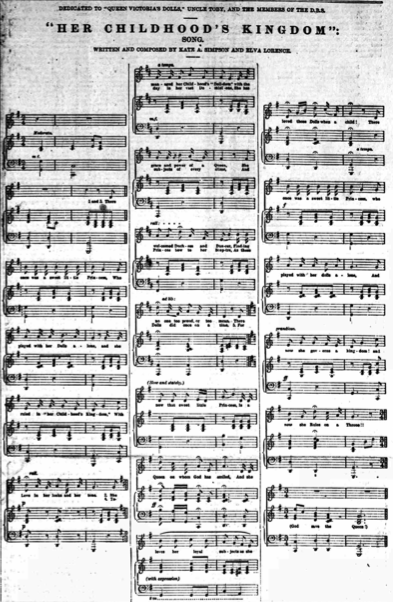
Her Childhood Kingdom a song by Florence Simpson (Elva Lorence) published in 1893.

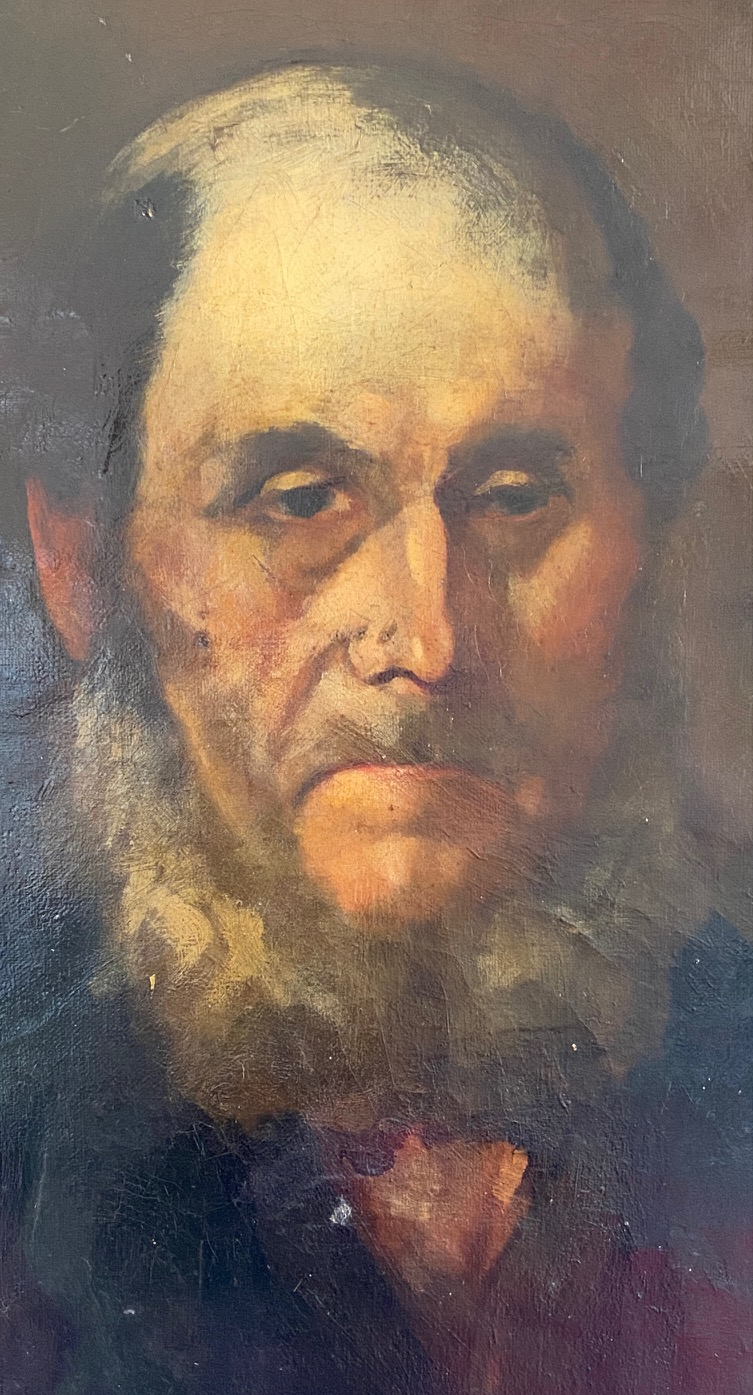
A portrait of Henry Read Pridgeon attributed to Florence Simpson

Florence Eva Simpson (1865–1923), who wrote under the name of Elva Lorence, was a popular British composer and writer.

== Work ==
Florence Simpson initially made a name for herself as a composer of songs and ballads – her first known published song being Her Childhood's Kingdom, written in 1893. Many of her songs set poems written and published by her sister Katherine Ashton Simpson, who became a well-known writer and artist. She also set a number of the poems of Fred G. Bowles, whose work she admired.

By the mid-1890s Simpson was widely known and acclaimed for her songs, which were popular and extensively performed by amateur and professional singers. The dramatic contralto Clara Butt regularly sang Simpson's song Old Donald's Lament, while American contralto Antoinette Sterling had Simpson's songs My ein Countrie and There is Rest is for the Weary in her repertoire. She performed There is Rest is for the Weary in a concert at Prince's Hall on Piccadilly, London, in May 1894, with the audience demanding an encore. Colleen Alannah and Barnbima were performed by singer Alice Gomez, while A Window in Spain was a favourite of the singers Madame Belle Cole and Osborne Rayner.

Florence Simpson and her sister Katherine Ashton Simpson collaborated on several operettas, including the comic opera Nanette or The Mermaid's Bubble (1896), and A Peep into Flowerland or Terra Flora (1902). The works were extremely popular and were performed numerous times across the country.

Another musical collaborator on both the operettas was George Kennedy Chrystie, Simpson's husband. Chrystie was a published composer in his own right, writing settings of a number of poems including those by his sister-in-law Katherine Ashton Simpson.

Simpson's creative partnership with Katherine Ashton Simpson effectively came to an end in 1906 when Katherine married and moved to Hartpury, Gloucestershire.

Simpson also published a number of short stories as well as plays, poetry and books. Her short stories were published in newspapers and were popular with readers. Most notable is perhaps her chilling Christmas ghost story, The Demon Motor: Story of New Year's Eve, published in 1901.

Like her sister, Katherine Ashton Simpson, Simpson received painting tuition as a young woman. An oil painting of Henry Read Pridgeon (1817–1886), District Registrar of Honiton, Devon, signed 'Eva Simpson' and with the monogram 'FES', is attributed to her.

== Private life ==
One of 14 children, Florence Simpson was born to the Reverend Michael Henry Simpson (1816–1888) and his wife Elizabeth, née Hendrick (1806–1905). On her mother's side, she was part of an old north country family, being a great-great-granddaughter of Lord Lever of Alkrington Hall.

Her father went on to be Vicar of the Church of St Philip and St James, Tow Law, County Durham, between 1862 and 1888. Simpson and her siblings grew up at the Vicarage in Tow Law. Her youngest sister, Alice Pickering (1860–1939), became a tennis player who twice reached the final of the Wimbledon Championship. Following their father's death Simpson and her sister Katherine Ashton Simpson lived at 7 Fern Road in Jesmond, Newcastle-Upon-Tyne. Following her marriage to George Kennedy Christie, she lived in Darlington in County Durham until her death in 1923.

== Compositions and writing ==
Operettas & Pagents

– Nanette or The Mermaid's Bubble (1896). Words by Katherine Ashton Simpson.

– A Peep into Flowerland or Terra Flora (1902) Music by Florence Simpson and George Kennedy Chrystie, and words by Katherine Ashton Simpson.

– Pegotty's Dream (1904). Music by Florence Simpson and George Kennedv Chrystie.

Songs

– Bambina. Publication date unknown but pre-1895.

– My ain Countrie. Publication date unknown but pre-1895.

– Coleen Alannah.Publication date unknown but pre-1895.

– Donna Dear. Publication date unknown but pre-1896.

– Her Childhood's Kingdom (1893). Words by Katherine Ashton Simpson.

– Old Donald's Lament (1894). Published by Ransford & Sons.

– There is Rest for the Weary (1894).

– A Window in Spain (1895). Published in London by Ascherberg & Co. Words by Fred G. Bowles (1895).

– Hips & Haws (1895). Published in London by Ascherberg & Co. Words by Fred G. Bowles.

– Thelma (1896). Words by Katherine Ashton Simpson.

– O’er the Water: Vesper Hymn of the Nuns (1896).

– Sailor Boy Blue (1898). Published in London by Evans & Co. Words by Fred G. Bowles.

– Flowerland (1904). Published by Novello & Co.

Selected Other Writing

– Sunday's Child (1898). Short story serialised in the Newcastle Chronicle.

– The Lass of Craigarrich (1900). Story serialised in the Weekly Record.

– The Demon Motor: Story of New Year's Eve (1901). Short ghost story published by the Buckingham Advertiser & Free Press.

– A Corner in Japan (1902). A one act comedy play.
