= Ray Garbutt =

English footballer

Personal information
- Full name: Raymond Hardiman Garbutt
- Date of birth: 9 May 1925
- Place of birth: Middlesbrough, England
- Date of death: 2 November 1994 (aged 69)
- Place of death: Middlestone Moor, England
- Position: Centre forward

Senior career*
Years	Team	Apps	(Gls)
19??–1947	South Bank East Enf		
	Middlesbrough	0	(0)
1947	Whitby Town	1	(4)
1947–1948	Manchester City	0	(0)
1948–1950	Spennymoor United		
1950–1951	Watford	22	(8)
1951–1952	Brighton & Hove Albion	32	(17)
1952–1953	Workington	8	(2)
- * Club domestic league appearances and goals

Raymond Hardiman Garbutt (9 May 1925 – 2 November 1994) was an English professional footballer who played as a centre forward in the Football League for Watford, Brighton & Hove Albion and Workington.

== Life and career ==
Garbutt was born in 1925 in Middlesbrough. During the Second World War, he served as a naval gunner; as a crew member of a rescue ship at the Dunkirk evacuation, he himself had to be rescued when his ship sank. After the war he played football for South Bank East End and was on Middlesbrough's books as an amateur before his single appearance for Whitby Town – he scored four goals in a Northern League match against Shildon in September 1947 – earned him a professional contract with Manchester City. He was unable to break through to City's first team, and at the end of the season joined Spennymoor United of the North Eastern League.

He signed for Watford of the Third Division South in 1950, and made his Football League debut on 30 August in a 1–0 defeat away to Reading. In ten months with the club, he scored 8 goals from 23 appearances before being swapped for Brighton & Hove Albion's centre forward Cyril Thompson. He scored 17 goals in 20 months for Brighton, at better than a goal every two games, but never established himself as a regular in the side, and moved on to Workington in November 1952. He fell out with the club over money, and left at the end of the season having played only eight times; Workington retained his registration for several years.

After football, Garbutt worked in the licensed trade and as a fitter for GEC. A keen golfer, he won the County Durham Seniors Championship and qualified for the Senior Open Championship in 1990. Garbutt died in Middlestone Moor, County Durham, in 1994 at the age of 69.
