= Weardale Iron and Coal Company =

The Weardale Iron and Coal Company, established in the 1840s, produced iron and steel at Tow Law and Tudhoe in County Durham in England, where it also owned collieries.

== History ==
The founder of the company, Charles Attwood (1791–1875), was born in Halesowen in the west midlands of England; his father and grandfather were involved in the iron industry of that area. His brothers Matthias Attwood and Thomas Attwood were bankers and politicians, and other brothers also had notable careers. Charles Attwood had other business interests during his career, and was a politician.

The company, founded in 1845 as the Weardale Iron Company, was created to exploit iron ore in Weardale; leasing rights were obtained there in the manors of Stanhope and Wolsingham. Six blast furnaces were built at Tow Law in County Durham, and the company built a railway to transport the iron ore to the ironworks. The company became in 1846 the Weardale Iron and Coal Company, with Attwood as a managing partner; it was controlled financially by Baring Brothers. Collieries were established in the area, and the company built houses for employees.

In 1853, an ironworks was built in Tudhoe, near Spennymoor in County Durham. Forges and rolling mills were built, and collieries were opened.

In 1861 the company began to make steel by the Bessemer process in Tudhoe, the first to do so in northern England. At Tow Law Attwood was the first licensee of the Siemens regenerative furnace to make steel.

In 1865 Attwood retired as managing partner of the company. The ironworks at Tow Law had closed by 1882; Tudhoe Iron and Steel Works had closed by 1901.
