= Cyril Thompson =

English footballer and cricketer

Personal information
- Full name: Cyril Alfred Thompson
- Date of birth: 18 December 1918
- Place of birth: Southend, Essex, England
- Date of death: 5 April 1972 (aged 53)
- Place of death: Folkestone, Kent, England
- Position: Centre forward

Senior career*
Years	Team	Apps	(Gls)
1945–1948	Southend United		
1948–1950	Derby County		
1950–1951	Brighton & Hove Albion		
1951–1953	Watford	78	(36)
1953–19xx	Folkestone Town		
- * Club domestic league appearances and goals

Cyril Alfred Thompson (18 December 1918 – 5 April 1972) was an English association footballer and cricketer. He played as a centre forward in the Football League for Southend United, Derby County, Brighton & Hove Albion and Watford. Aged 34, he then moved into non-league football with Folkestone Town, whom he later served as a trainer. Before beginning his career, he served in the British Armed forces in the Second World War, and spent five years in a Prisoner of War camp.

== Football career ==
After being freed from captivity, Thompson returned to his hometown, joining Southend United. However, the Football League remained suspended for the 1945–46 season, meaning that Thompson was 27 years old when he made his League debut. Despite this, his performances over the following two seasons earned him a transfer to Derby County in 1948, and to Brighton & Hove Albion during the 1949–50 season. His stay there lasted twelve months; in March 1951 he moved to Watford in a direct swap for fellow centre forward Ray Garbutt.

Thompson started his Watford career well, playing in all of Watford's remaining 12 league fixtures and scoring 5 goals in the process. Better was to follow in his first full season at the club, when he scored 25 goals from 43 appearances in all competitions. Thompson achieved these tallies despite playing in a team that had finished 23rd and 21st in the league in the respective seasons. Thompson started 1952–53 in a similar vein, but struggled to maintain his form under new manager Len Goulden, and left Watford at the end of the season.

After leaving Watford, Thompson finished his career at non-league Folkestone, and later coached the club, living in the area until his death.
