= Katherine Ashton Simpson =

British author

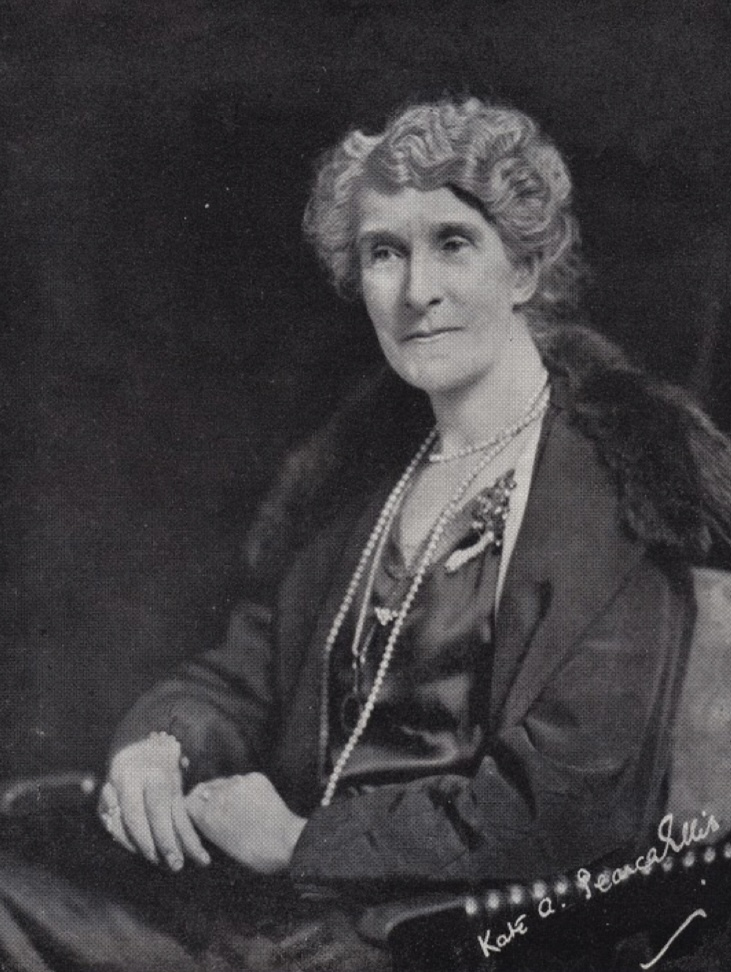
Katherine Ashton Simpson

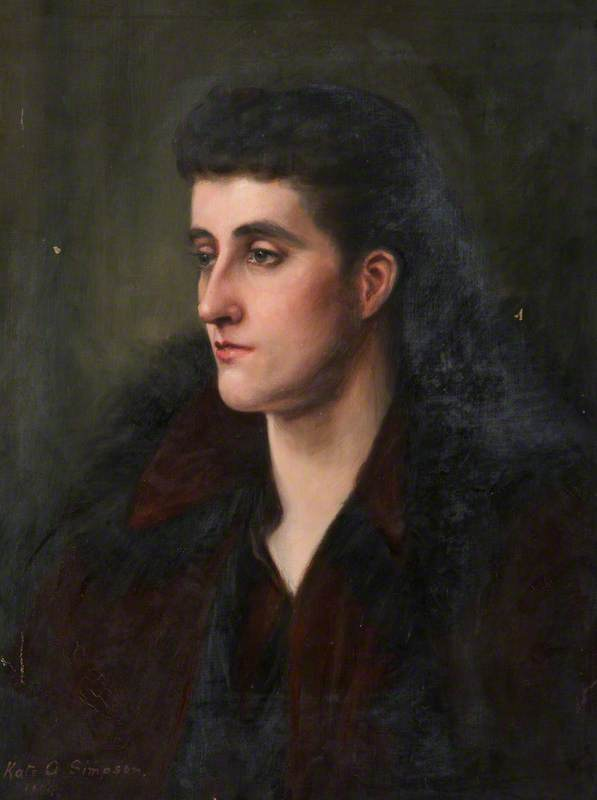
Katherine Ashton Simpson's 1894 portrait of her sister Florence Eva Simpson. Part of the collection of Touchstones Rochdale gallery.

Katherine Ashton Simpson (known as Kate A. Pearce Simpson; after marriage, Kate A. Pearce-Ellis; (1858–1951) was a British author, poet, and painter.

== Work ==
Simpson published several books and poetry collections. A number of her poems were set to music by her sister Florence Eva Simpson (Elva Lorence; 1865–1923) as songs which were published and widely performed. They also collaborated on several operettas; the comic opera Nanette or The Mermaid's Bubble (1896) and A Peep into Flowerland or Terra Flora. Simpson's poems were also set to music by the composers Frederick Crouch and George Kennedy Christie, the later being Florence Eva Simpson's husband.

Simpson was also a trained painter. Her picture of her sister Florence Eva Simpson was exhibited and at the Berwick Exhibition in Newcastle-on-Tyne. The painting is now in the collection Touchstones Rochdale gallery, run by Rochdale Arts & Heritage Service. Simpson exhibited several paintings in the painting at the Royal Scottish Academy. These included her painting 'The Artist's Little Model'.

After which marriage in 1906, Simpson wrote her poetry and journalism under the name of Kate A. Pearce-Ellis. However, she continued to write as Kate a. Pearce Simpson for the short stories she continued to publish in newspapers across the country – including in the Bristol Times & Mirror, The Weekly Northern Gazette, and in the Stalybridge Reporter.

Simpson became a leading figure in social welfare organisations and a sought-after speaker on a range of subjects.

== Personal life ==
Simpson was born in Fairburn, near Ledsham, West Yorkshire, on 8 March 1858. One of 14 children, her parents were the Reverend Michael Henry Simpson (1816–1888) and his wife Elizabeth, née Hendrick (1806–1905). She was baptised by her father on 5 April 1858.

On her mother's side, she was part of an old north country family, being a great-great-granddaughter of Lord Lever of Alkrington Hall. Her father went on to be Vicar of the Church of St Philip and St James, Tow Law, County Durham, between 1862 and 1888.

Simpson and her siblings grew up at the Vicarage in Tow Law. Her youngest sister, Alice Pickering (1860–1939), became a tennis player who twice reached the final of the Wimbledon Championship.

She was married in Darlington on 18 September 1906 to John Pearce Ellis (1838–1925), a farmer 20 years her senior, after which her writings were often created under the name of Kate A. Pearce-Ellis. After her marriage she and her husband lived at Longford House, in Longford, Gloucestershire. They attended St Mary the Virgin's Church, Hartpury, where Simpson became churchwarden, and later St. Matthew's Church Twigworth. John Pearce-Ellis died in 1925 and she died at Longford House on 24 December 1951. She was buried with her husband in the churchyard of St Mary the Virgin's Church Hartpury.
