= Whitworth Hall Country Park =

Country park in County Durham, England

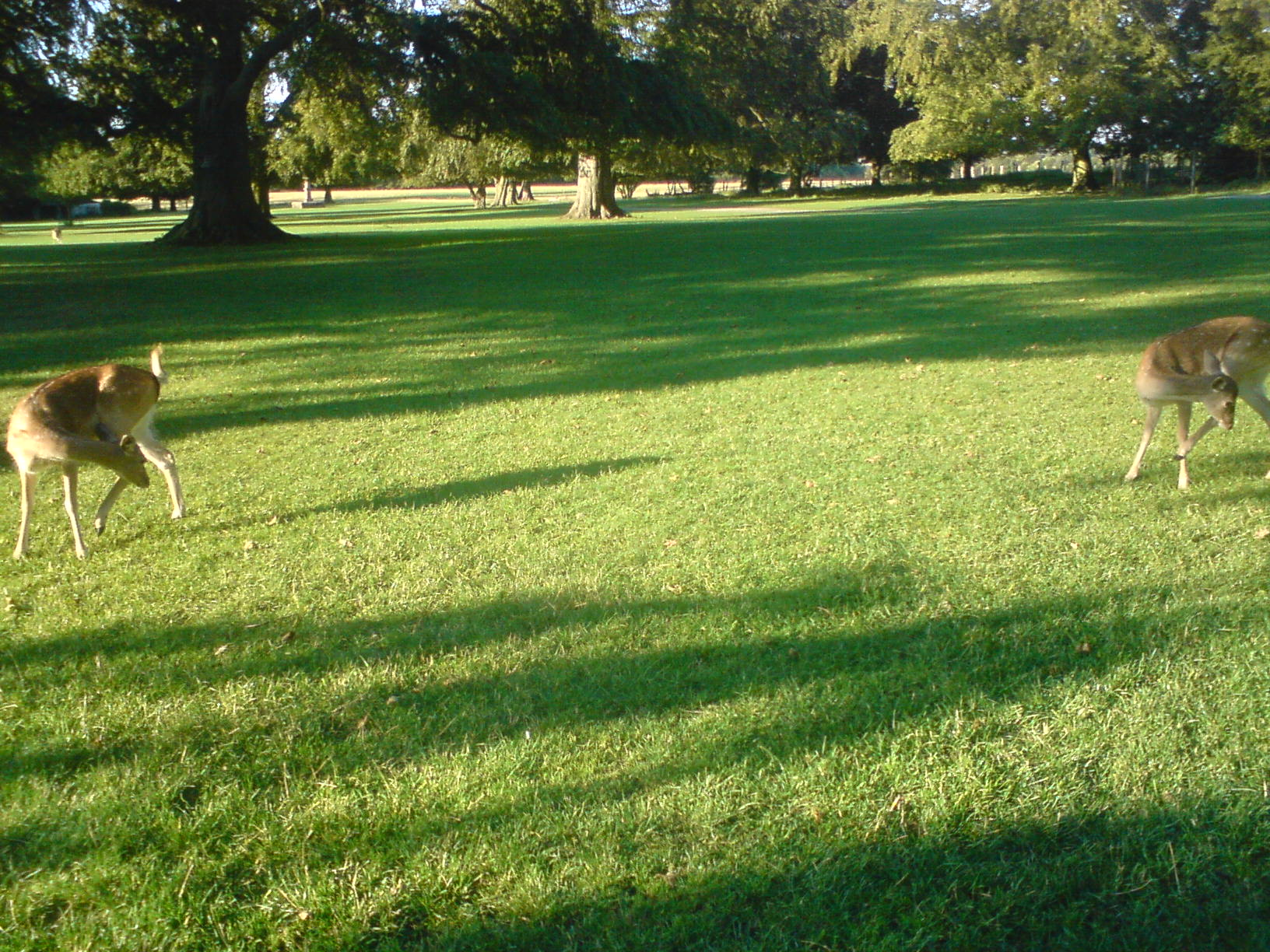
- The Deer Park

- Location within County Durham
- OS grid: NZ236347
- Coordinates: 54.707°N 1.634°W

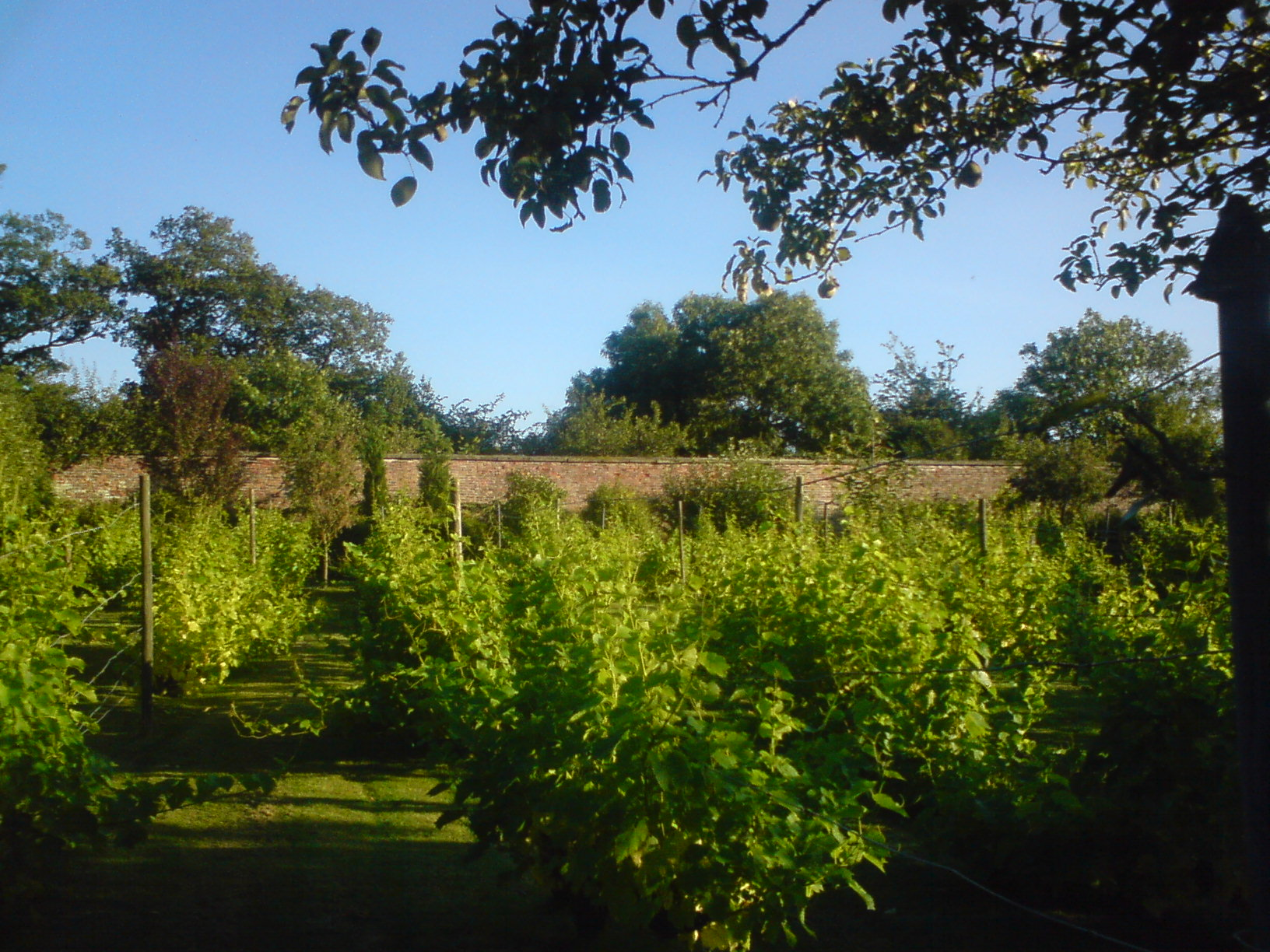
The Vineyard

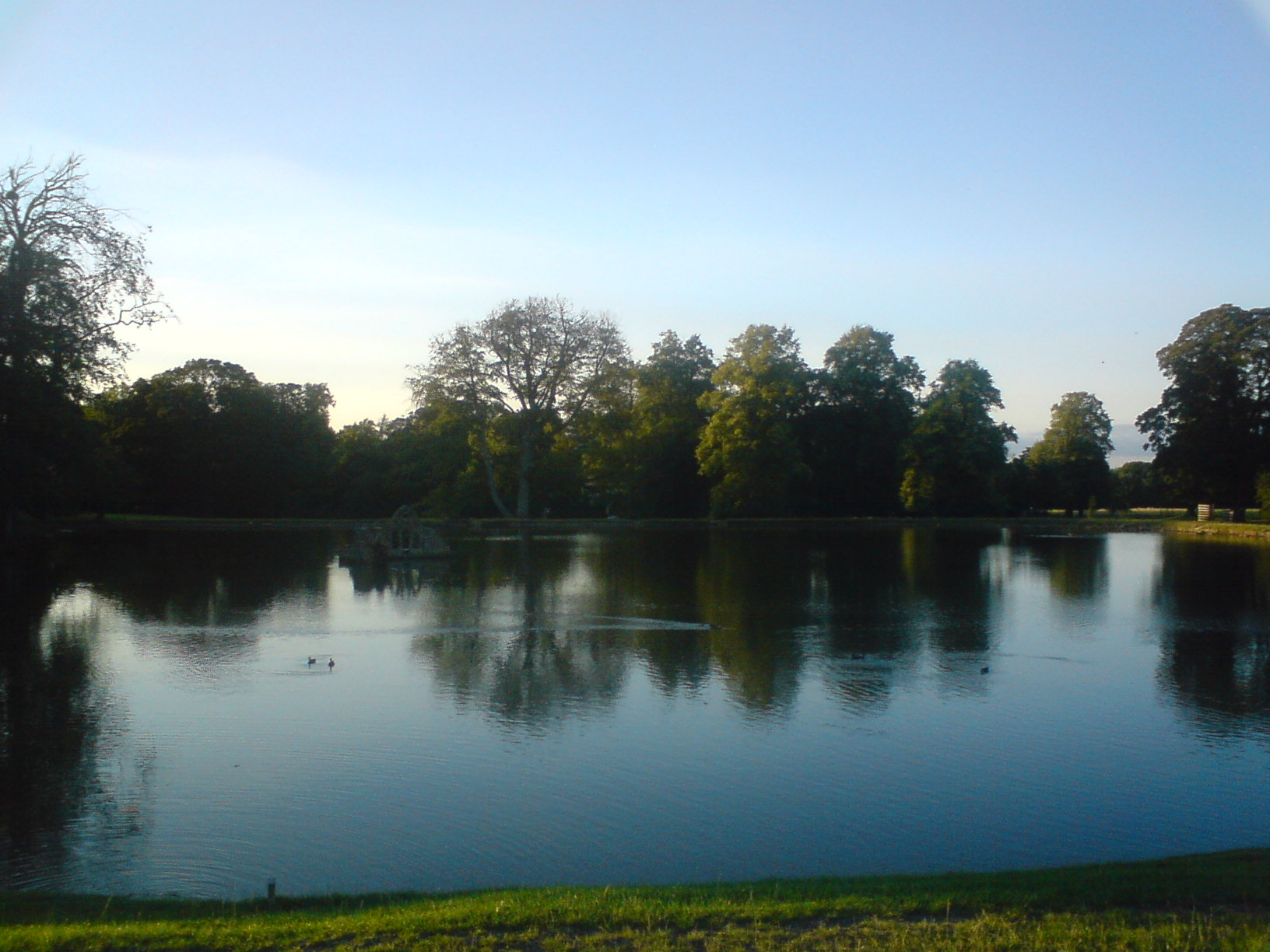
The Lake

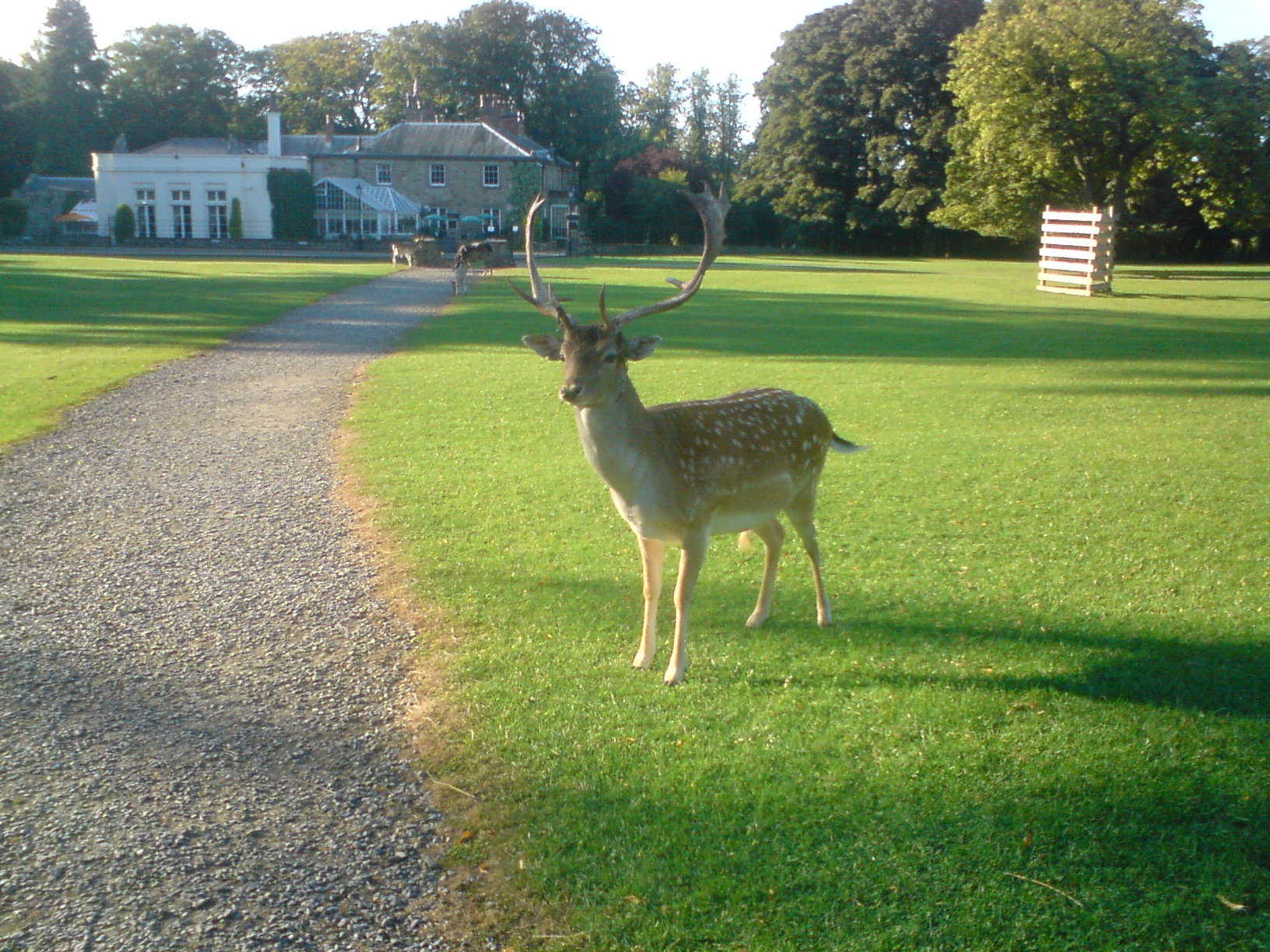
Grade II stately mansion which is now a hotel is situated within the park

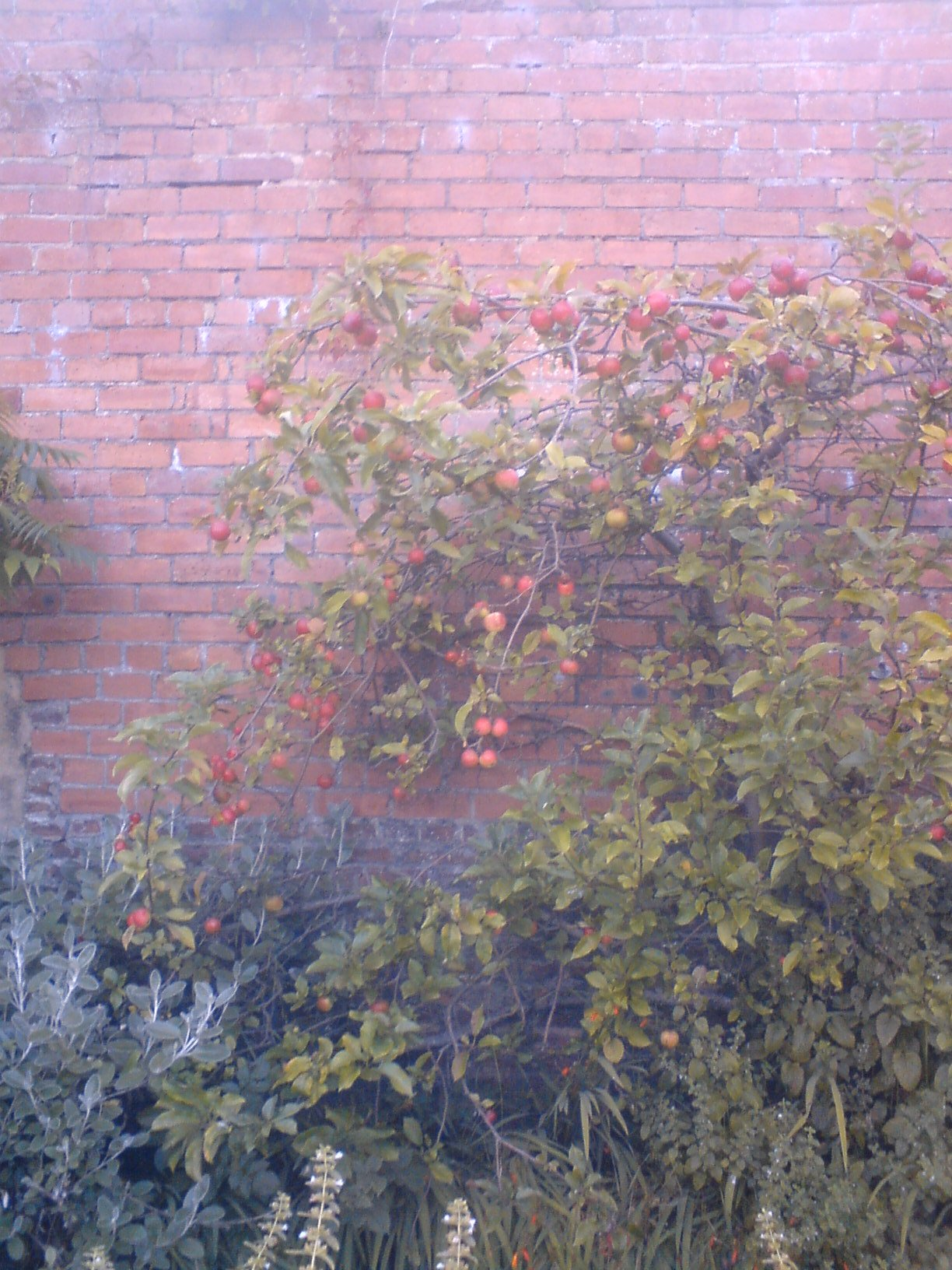
Apples grow up the wall of the garden

Whitworth Hall Country Park is a parkland based set in 73 acres (300,000 m^{2}) 8 miles (13 km) from Durham in England, which rests on the outskirts of the town of Spennymoor in County Durham.

The park includes Whitworth Hall, a Grade II listed stately mansion (the ancestral home of Bobby Shafto an 18th-century MP) hotel, deer park, lake and Shafto's Inn. The park includes a Victorian walled garden which contains England's most northerly vineyard. The current building was rebuilt in the 19th century.
