= Irthlingborough =

Town in Northamptonshire, England

Coordinates: 52.324°N 0.614°W

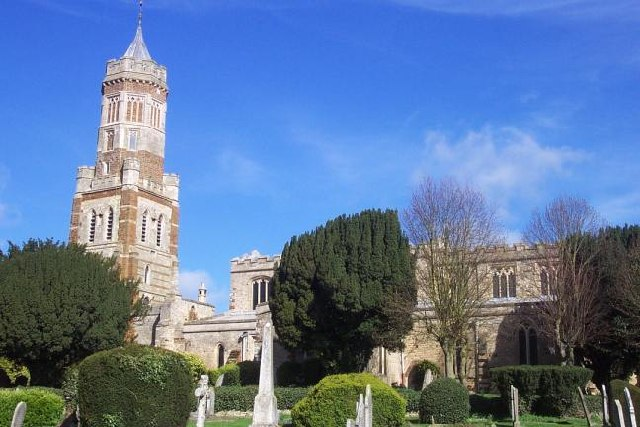
- St Peter's Church, Irthlingborough

- Location within Northamptonshire
- Population: 9,325 (2021)
- OS grid reference: SP945705
- Civil parish: Irthlingborough
- Unitary authority: North Northamptonshire
- Ceremonial county: Northamptonshire
- Region: East Midlands
- Country: England
- Sovereign state: United Kingdom
- Post town: WELLINGBOROUGH
- Postcode district: NN9
- Dialling code: 01933
- Police: Northamptonshire
- Fire: Northamptonshire
- Ambulance: East Midlands
- UK Parliament: Wellingborough and Rushden
- Website: Irthlingborough Town Council

Irthlingborough (/ˈɜːrθlɪŋbərə/) is a town on the River Nene in North Northamptonshire, England. As of 2021, it has a population of 9,325, and was at one point the smallest town in England to have had a Football League team, Rushden & Diamonds F.C. The parish church, St Peter, has a lantern tower, unusual for Northamptonshire churches, which was built to guide travellers across the Nene valley in foggy weather. It also has doors at the four cardinal points and has eight misericords in the chancel.

Irthlingborough railway station opened in 1845 and closed to passengers in 1964.

== History ==
The town's name origin is uncertain. Possible meanings include 'ploughmen's fortification', with the suggestion that oxen were once kept here, or 'fortification of Yrtla's people'. Alternatively, the first element may be connected to the Old English 'yrthling', a type of bird such as a wren, wagtail, or lapwing. Bird names are frequently used to form compounds with Old English 'burh'.

Irthlingborough was called Yrtlingaburg in the 8th century, Erdiburn in the Domesday Book of 1086, and Artleborough later. King Offa of Mercia held court near Irthlingborough circa 790.

John Pyel, the mayor of London in 1372, is believed to have been born at Irthlingborough circa 1310.

In 1913, a feature film showing the Battle of Waterloo was made in Irthlingborough, using hundreds of local people as extras. The town was chosen as the Duke of Wellington had once observed that the local countryside resembled the Waterloo battlefield.

Irthlingborough Viaduct carries the A6 across the River Nene. Opened in 1939, the concrete viaduct is 31 span concrete viaduct over the river was opened on 23 October 1936 by Leslie Hore-Belisha, Minister of Transport. 75% of the £55,750 costs were paid for by Ministry of Transport. It formed a southern extension of Irthlingborough Bypass which opened 1932. The location was featured in promotional images for English rock band NUMB’s self-titled album in 2017, as well as images for three songs from A Transmission of Hope (2024) by English rock musician Tyler Quantrill.

Next to the A6 is Irthlingborough Bridge, a 14th century arched bridge over the River Nene. One of the five cutwaters bears the date 1668. The bridge was widened in 1754 and repaired in 1922. It is listed on the National Heritage List for England.

=== Mining ===
In the past, ironstone was mined near Irthlingborough, and as part of the local ironstone mine, a tunnel was bored between Irthlingborough and nearby Finedon. The tunnel still exists, but the Irthlingborough end has been landscaped over, and the Finedon end sealed with concrete.

Iron ore was mined at Irthlingborough from 1918. The mine was owned and operated by Richard Thomas & Baldwin's Ltd., the ore being sent to RTB's Redbourne steelworks in Scunthorpe. The ore was extracted from a system of underground tunnels approximately 80–100 ft below the surface. The mine was closed down as no longer economic on 30 September 1965.

=== Quarrying ===
More recently, the River Nene floodplains between the town and its neighbour, Higham Ferrers, have been quarried for gravel. Quarrying in the area was extensive, stretching to Northampton in the west (upstream) and Thorpe Waterville in the north-northeast (downstream). The quarries were later left to fill with water to produce artificial lakes.

In 2012, the area was acquired by The Wildlife Trust, and has since been turned into Irthlingborough Lakes and Meadows, a nature reserve. It will be part of the Upper Nene Valley Special Protection Area.

== Main roads ==
The A6 used to pass through the town, but was bypassed in the 1930s to the north. The former route is the B5348. Irthlingborough Viaduct was built in 1936 and connects the town to Higham Ferrers and the busy A45. The A45 (former A605) is a straighter and more dependable road than the A6.

== Local economy ==
Whitworths, the home baking and fruit snack company, has been based in the town since 1886, and in 2024, employed 200 people at the plant on the B571 (Wellingborough Road). Sonifex, a manufacturer of radio broadcast products, has been in the town since its beginning in 1969 and has its research and manufacturing based on Station Road. Dr. Martens has a long history with the town; the manufacturer R. Griggs, owned by Max Griggs, had its head office in the town until production moved to China in 2003, after suffering large losses. The company's office is now in Wollaston.

== Education ==
There is an infant school, with nursery attached, a junior school and one secondary school, Huxlow Academy, which has a sixth form that is part of the east Northamptonshire sixth form college.

== Media ==
Local news and television programmes are provided by BBC East and ITV Anglia. Television signals are received from the Sandy Heath TV transmitter. Local radio stations are BBC Radio Northampton on 103.6 FM, Heart East on 96.6 FM and Smooth East Midlands (formerly Connect FM) on 107.4 FM.The town is served by the local newspaper, Northamptonshire Evening Telegraph.

== Sport ==
Between 2001 and 2006, Irthlingborough held the distinction of being the smallest town to hold a Football League club when Rushden & Diamonds F.C. were promoted to League 2 (then known as Division 3) after winning the 2000-01 Football Conference title. This was in part due to the funding of local businessman Max Griggs who bankrolled the club in the late 1990s until the mid millennium, when he sold to a fans group for just £1 in 2005. The club were relegated from the Football League in 2006 and went out of business in 2011 due to severe financial problems. A successor fans owned club, AFC Rushden & Diamonds, was formed two months after Rushden and Diamonds folded in July 2011. In its first season, it had an under-18 youth team which played at Raunds Town F.C., then joining the United Counties League (Step 6 in the FA Pyramid) in a ground share arrangement with Wellingborough Town at the Dog and Duck stadium. Two further promotions followed with AFCRD reaching Step 4. In 2018, having played for one season at Hayden Road ground in Rushden (the former home of Rushden Town before the forming of RDFC in 1992) in another ground share with Rushden and Higham Utd, the club won promotion to the FA's Step 3 Premier Division Central of the Southern Football League. The original stadium, Nene Park, was demolished in 2017.

== Notable people ==
Snooker player Shaun Murphy grew up in the town.
