= Irthlingborough Lakes and Meadows =

Nature reserve in Northamptonshire, England

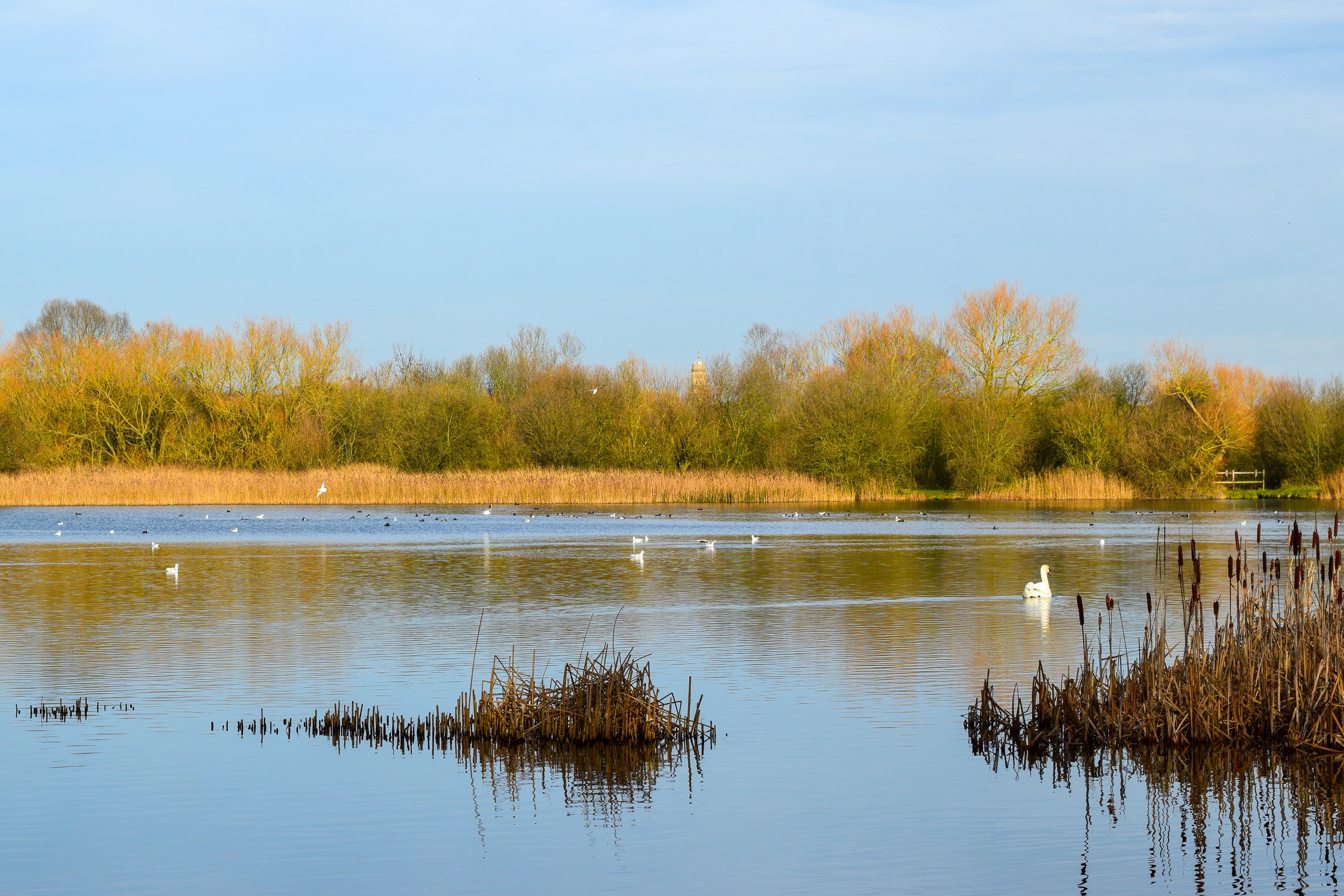
- View looking North across Corner Lake

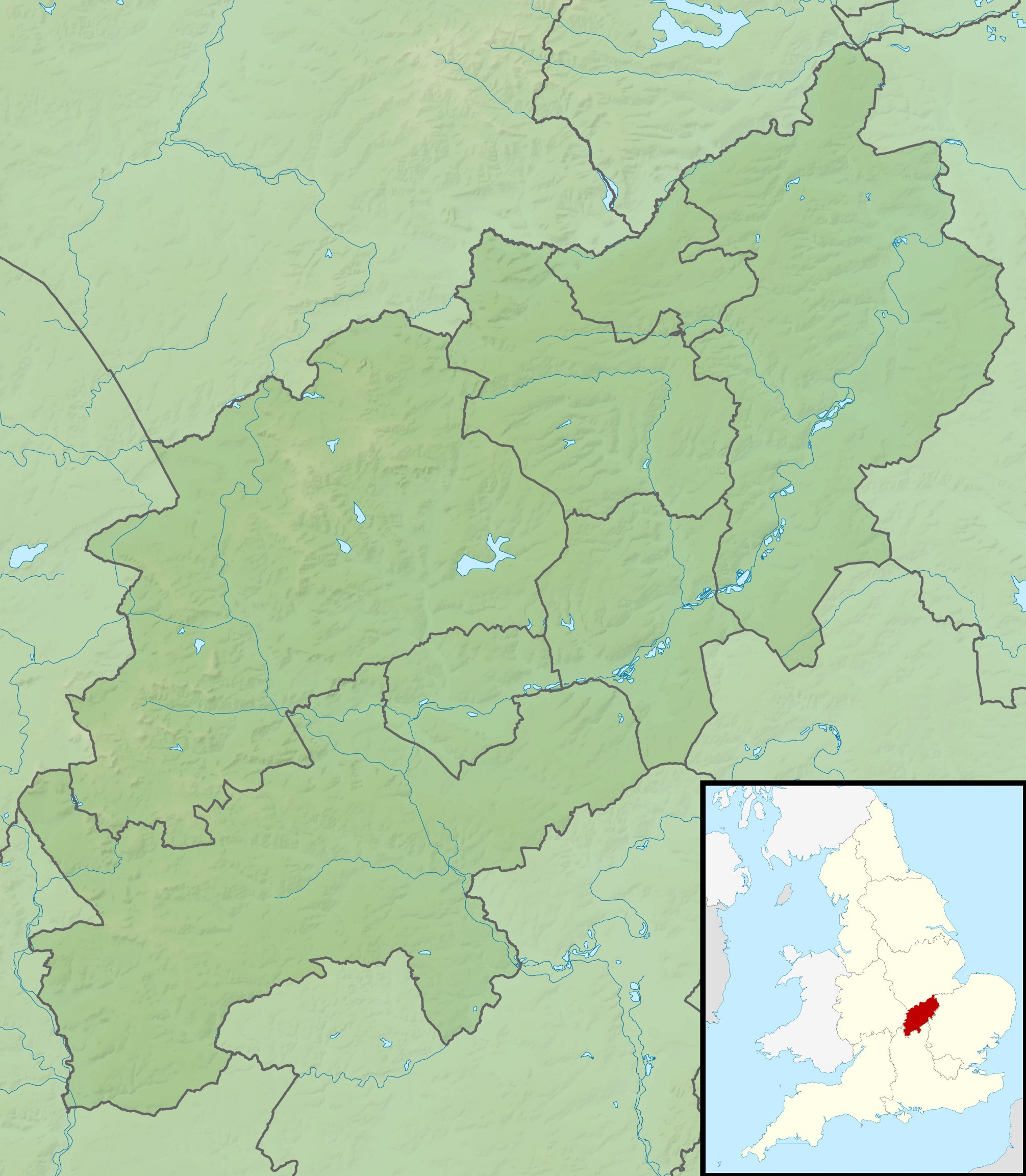
- Location within Northamptonshire
- Location: Irthlingborough, Northamptonshire
- Coordinates: 52°19′10.92″N 0°36′10.44″W
- Area: 117 hectares (290 acres)
- Created: 2012
- Operator: Wildlife Trust for Bedfordshire, Cambridgeshire and Northamptonshire
- Status: Open all year
- Website: http://www.irthlingboroughlakesandmeadows.org

Irthlingborough Lakes and Meadows (grid reference SP953699) is a 117-hectare (290-acre) nature reserve in Northamptonshire, owned and managed by the Wildlife Trust for Bedfordshire, Cambridgeshire and Northamptonshire. The character of the reserve is defined by flooded gravel pits and wet grassland, providing an excellent habitat for large variety of wetland flora and fauna.

The site forms part of the larger Upper Nene Valley Gravel Pits Site of Special Scientific Interest (SSSI) and Special Protection Area.

It is situated in close proximity to several other Wildlife Trust nature reserves, such as Higham Ferrers Pits, Wilson's Pits and Ditchford Lakes and Meadows, significantly improving the benefit for wildlife by creating joined-up protected landscapes. It is adjacent to Stanwick Lakes, a reserve managed by the Rockingham Forest Trust.

== History ==
Originally water meadows and agricultural fields straddling both sides of the River Nene, the site has been transformed significantly in recent history. The first such intervention was the construction of the Northampton to Peterborough Railway, which opened in 1845. During its construction, ironstone was discovered in the Nene Valley.

Following the outbreak of World War I, in 1916, the Ebbw Vale Mining Company commenced operations, producing around 6000 tons of ore per week.

The most recent and most impactful intervention on the landscape began in the 1970s, with the large scale extraction of sand and gravel along the Nene Valley. An electric conveyor belt was constructed following the now disused railway line to transport the material to a processing plant at nearby Stanwick Lakes. By the time operations ceased in 2002, more than 1.5 million tons of aggregate had been extracted from the area. The pits were then allowed to flood, creating the present day series of lakes and channels.

In 2012, with help from a Heritage Lottery Fund grant and public donations, the Wildlife Trust for Bedfordshire, Cambridgeshire and Northamptonshire purchased the neglected site. It is now the focus of some of the trust's most important work as part of the Nene Valley Living Landscapes conservation scheme. To maximize the reserve's benefit for wildlife and biodiversity, numerous improvement works have been undertaken. These include the creation of new islands and removal of willow and electricity pylons.

== Wildlife ==
The Nene Valley is one of the most important wetlands in England and has gained international recognition for its significance as a stop-over for thousands of wildfowl and waders that visit during the winter. The quantity and variety of birdlife varies greatly with the seasons, with the following overwintering at the site:

- Golden Plover (Pluvialis apricaria)
- Wigeon (Anas penelope)
- Gadwall (Anas strepera)
- Tufted duck (Aythya fuligula)

Surrounding the river and lakes, fragments of now rare meadow survive. These provide ideal conditions for meadowsweet, great burnet and common spotted orchid.

== Management ==
A variety of different management techniques are being used to maintain and bolster the reserve's benefit for wildlife. Within the wetland areas, ditches are periodically cleared, scrub is removed and trees copsed to maintain the open nature of the gravel pits. The grassland is grazed and cut on rotation to maintain a mosaic of grassland scrub habitats.
