= Sedgefield (borough) =

Former local government district in England

Coordinates: 54.654°N 1.448°W

Borough of Sedgefield
- Shown within ceremonial County Durham
- History
  - Origin: Sedgefield Rural District; Spennymoor Urban District; Shildon Urban District; Darlington Rural District
  - Created: 1974
  - Abolished: 2009
  - Succeeded by: County Durham
- Status: District, Borough
- ONS code: 20UG
- Government: Sedgefield Borough Council
  - HQ: Spennymoor

Sedgefield District was, from 1974 to 2009, a local government district and (from 1996), borough in County Durham, in North East England. It had a population of about 87,000 (2001 UK census). It was named after Sedgefield, but its largest town was Newton Aycliffe. Other places included Shildon, Ferryhill and Spennymoor.

The borough was formed (as Sedgefield District), in 1974, under the Local Government Act 1972, by the merger of Sedgefield Rural District, Spennymoor and Shildon urban districts and part of Darlington Rural District.

The borough was abolished as part of the 2009 structural changes to local government in England.

From 1983 to 2007, most of the district was represented in parliament by Tony Blair, who became Leader of the Labour Party in 1994, and Prime Minister in 1997.

== Electoral divisions of the district in pre-2009 Durham County Council ==
- Aycliffe East Aycliffe Village, Neville and Shafto St Mary's parish wards of Great Aycliffe parish
- Aycliffe North Woodham ward; Woodham South parish ward of Great Aycliffe parish
- Aycliffe West West ward; Simpasture parish ward of Great Aycliffe parish
- Chilton Chilton ward; Cornforth parish; Merrington parish ward of Spennymoor parish
- Ferryhill Broom ward; Ferryhill ward
- Sedgefield Sedgefield ward; Bishop Middleham parish
- Shildon East Greenfield Middridge ward; Thickley ward
- Shildon West Byerley ward; Sunnydale ward
- Spennymoor and Middlestone Spennymoor ward; Byers Green and Middlestone parish wards of Spennymoor parish
- Trimdon Fishburn and Old Trimdon ward; New Trimdon and Trimdon Grange ward
- Tudhoe Low Spennymoor and Tudhoe Grange ward; Tudhoe ward
