= Touchstones Rochdale =

Art and heritage centre in Greater Manchester, England

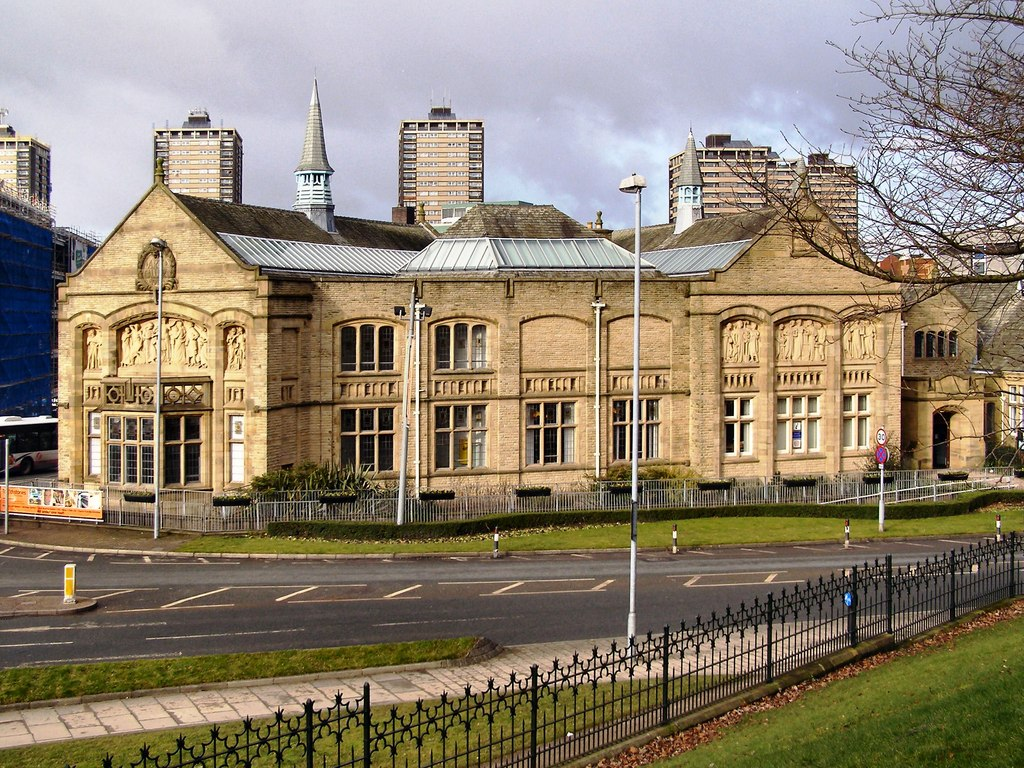
- Touchstones Rochdale seen from Broadfield Park

- Location within Greater Manchester

General information
- Location: The Esplanade, Rochdale, Greater Manchester, England
- Coordinates: 53.6152°N 2.1620°W
- Years built: 1883 (library); 1903 (museum); 1913 (art gallery)

Technical details
- Material: Yorkshire stone, slate

Website
- Official website

Listed Building – Grade II
- Official name: Rochdale Central Library, Museum and Art Gallery
- Designated: 12 February 1985
- Reference no.: 1367096

Touchstones Rochdale is an art gallery, museum, local studies centre, visitor information centre and café forming part of the Central Library, Museum and Art Gallery in Rochdale, Greater Manchester, England. It is a Grade II listed building.

The first part of the stone building was opened as a library in 1884 with the museum and gallery being added in 1903 and extended in 1913. It became an art and heritage centre in 2003. It houses collections relating to local history and related topics, with changing exhibitions over time.

== History ==
The library was built first, opening in 1884, after a fire at Rochdale Town Hall destroyed the "Clock Tower Library" in 1883. The art gallery and museum were built and linked to the library in 1903, and an extension added in 1913. The building was converted into an art and heritage centre in 2003.

== Collections ==
The museum has collections relating to: social history, costume and textiles, archaeology, Egyptology, geology, natural history and decorative arts. It also hosts changing exhibitions.

The collection includes a painting by Katherine Ashton Simpson (1858–1951), of her sister, the writer, composer and artist Florence Eva Simpson, known as Elva Lorence (1865–1923).

== Architecture ==
It is in Yorkshire stone and has a slate roof. The library has one storey, a front of three gables with ball finials, a central porch with an arcaded parapet, an elliptical-headed doorway, and mullioned and transomed windows with elliptical heads and hood moulds. The museum and art gallery have two storeys, a four-bay central block, a three-bay gabled block to the right, and a diagonally-set gabled block to the left. On the gables are panels of carved figures.

== See also ==
- Listed buildings in Rochdale
