= Whitworths =

Dried fruits, nuts, home baking and snack products company

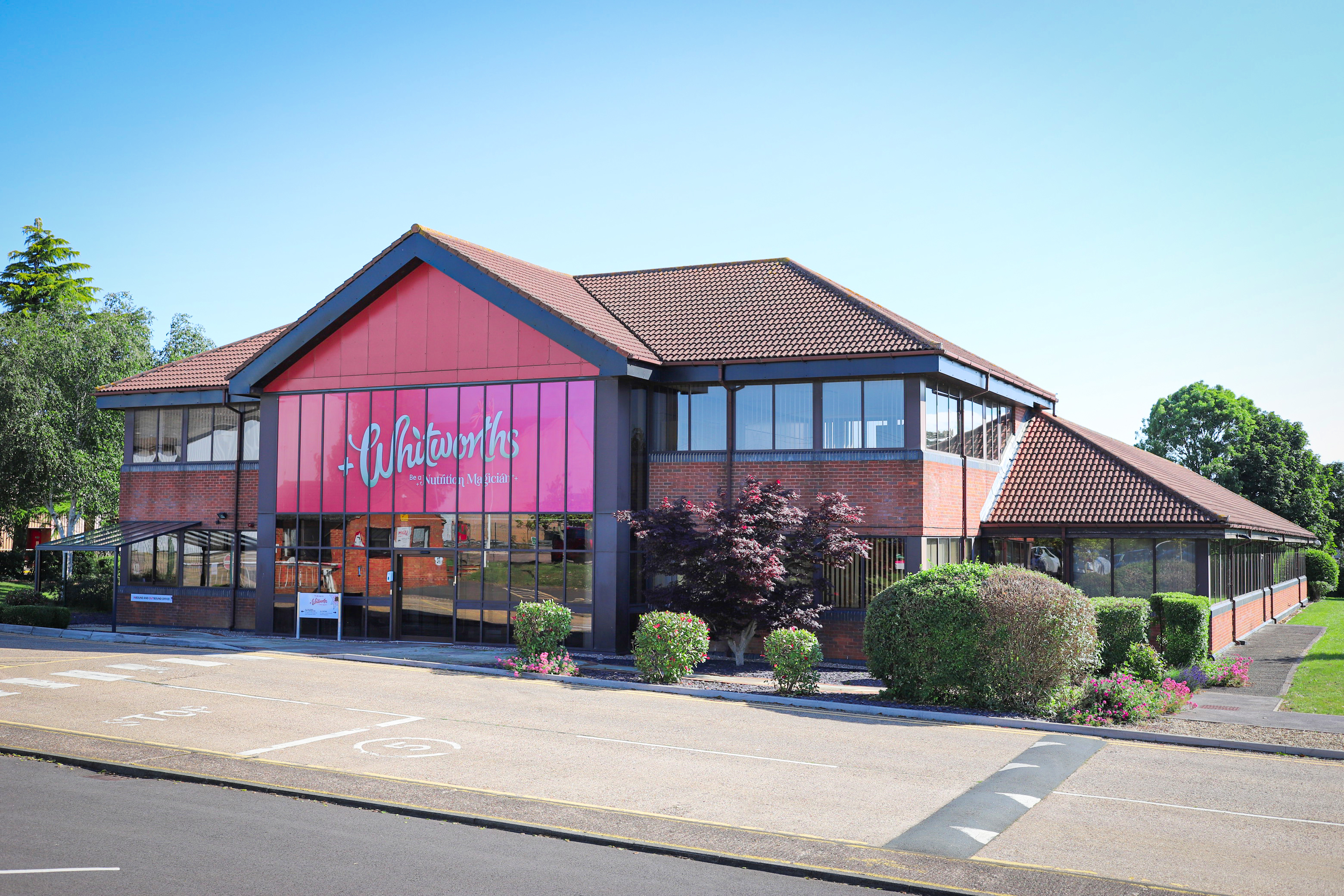
- Whitworths head office Wellingborough Road Irthlingborough.
- Formerly: Whitworth Bros.
- Industry: Snacks
- Founded: 1886
- Headquarters: Irthlingborough, Northamptonshire, United Kingdom
- Owner: Anatolia
- Website: https://whitworths.co.uk/

Whitworths is a dried fruit, nuts, home baking and snack products company, established in 1886 based in Irthlingborough, Northamptonshire, UK. As of March 2009 it employed 310 people. The company was begun by the three Whitworth brothers John, Herbert and Newton trading under the name of Whitworth Bros. The current Whitworths business is no longer associated with Whitworth Bros who are based nearby, and produce flour.

In 1971 they were awarded the Royal Warrant by Queen Elizabeth the Queen Mother and in 1974 by Queen Elizabeth II.

== History ==
In September 2013 they were purchased by private equity firm Equistone, and in May 2017 they were sold to Anatolia, a Turkish producer of dried fruit.

== See also ==
- Wellingborough Whitworth F.C.
