= Tow Law =

Town in County Durham, England

Coordinates: 54°44′52″N 1°48′54″W

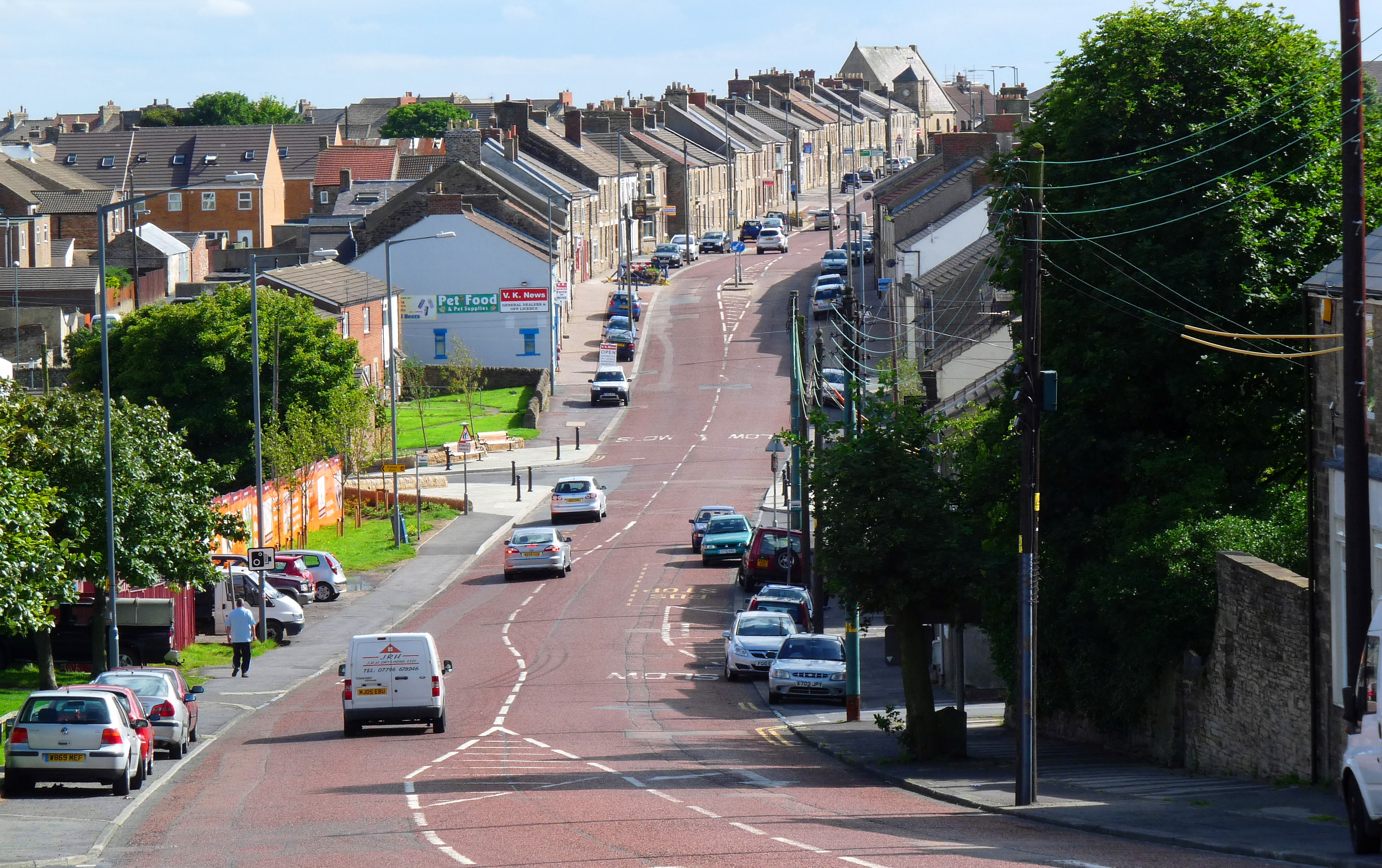
- High Street, Tow Law, A68

- Location within County Durham
- Population: 2,138 (2011)
- OS grid reference: NZ119393
- Unitary authority: County Durham
- Ceremonial county: County Durham
- Region: North East
- Country: England
- Sovereign state: United Kingdom
- Post town: BISHOP AUCKLAND
- Postcode district: DL13
- Dialling code: 01388
- Police: Durham
- Fire: County Durham and Darlington
- Ambulance: North East
- UK Parliament: Bishop Auckland

Tow Law /taʊˈlɔː/ is a town and civil parish in County Durham, England. It is situated a few miles to the south of Consett and 5 miles to the north west of Crook.

According to the 2001 census it had a population of 1,952, increasing to 2,138 at the 2011 Census.

The main road through the town is the A68, which starts in Darlington and goes on north, ending near Dalkeith, just south-east of Edinburgh. The River Deerness rises from a spring on the eastern edge of the town.

Tow Law Town football club is based in the town. The town is mentioned in Mark Knopfler's song "Hill Farmer's Blues" from his album The Ragpicker's Dream.

== History ==
The name "Tow Law" is from the Old English tot hlaw meaning "lookout mound," the name of a house which stood there before the iron works and the village were built.

St Philip & St James' Church Tow Law, designed by C. Hodgson Fowler, was completed in 1869.

There was rapid growth in the mid 19th century after the Weardale Iron and Coal Company was established here in 1845. Blast furnaces were built and collieries were opened; the population was about 2000 in 1851, and 5000 in 1881.

The town constituted an urban district from 1894 until 1974.

=== 21st century ===
Since December 2001 the town has had a 2.3 Megawatt wind farm consisting of three 50 m (160 ft)-high wind-powered turbines. During the 2001 foot and mouth crisis, MAFF buried diseased animals at the former Inkerman Pit site. This was an emotive issue for local residents, who were disturbed by vehicle movements and smells from the pit. Many protesters attended the site every day for six months but had no effect and Defra continued to keep the site operational until the spring of 2002.

== Notable people ==
- Albert Ernest Hillary, English chocolate manufacturer and Liberal politician
- Sean Hodgson, Britain's longest serving prisoner (27 years) found to be innocent
- Alan Milburn, British Labour politician
- Alice Pickering (1860-1939), tennis player who twice reached the Wimbledon Championship Final.
- Katherine Ashton Simpson (1858–1951), the British author, poet and painter.
- Chris Waddle, former Premier League footballer played for Tow Law Town A.F.C.
