= Middlestone Moor =

Village in County Durham, England

Coordinates: 54.688°N 1.625°W

Middlestone Moor is a village in County Durham, England. It is situated to the south west of Spennymoor - within the town council's limits.

On 12 February 2007, there was a major gas leak causing homes in Spennymoor, Crook, Howden-Le-Wear, and some in the Coundon area, to lose their gas supply. 30 houses in Westerton Close were evacuated and their inhabitants put into overnight accommodation.

It is home to local football club, Middlestone Moor Masons Arms FC, who play from Middlestone Moor Community Centre playing fields/the South Durham Bowl, running from the Masons Arms public house. The club runs a Saturday team that competes in the 'Crook and District League', and a Sunday side competing in the 'Spennymoor Sunday League'.

The club has achieved Chartered Standard status from the Football Association. During the annual 'Pups Vs. Veterans' football match in 2006, there was the second recorded occurrence of the horrific football injury Boothy Knee.

There is also a working men's club and a pub called the Binchester in the village.
