= Tudhoe =

Village in County Durham, England

Coordinates: 54.709°N 1.585°W

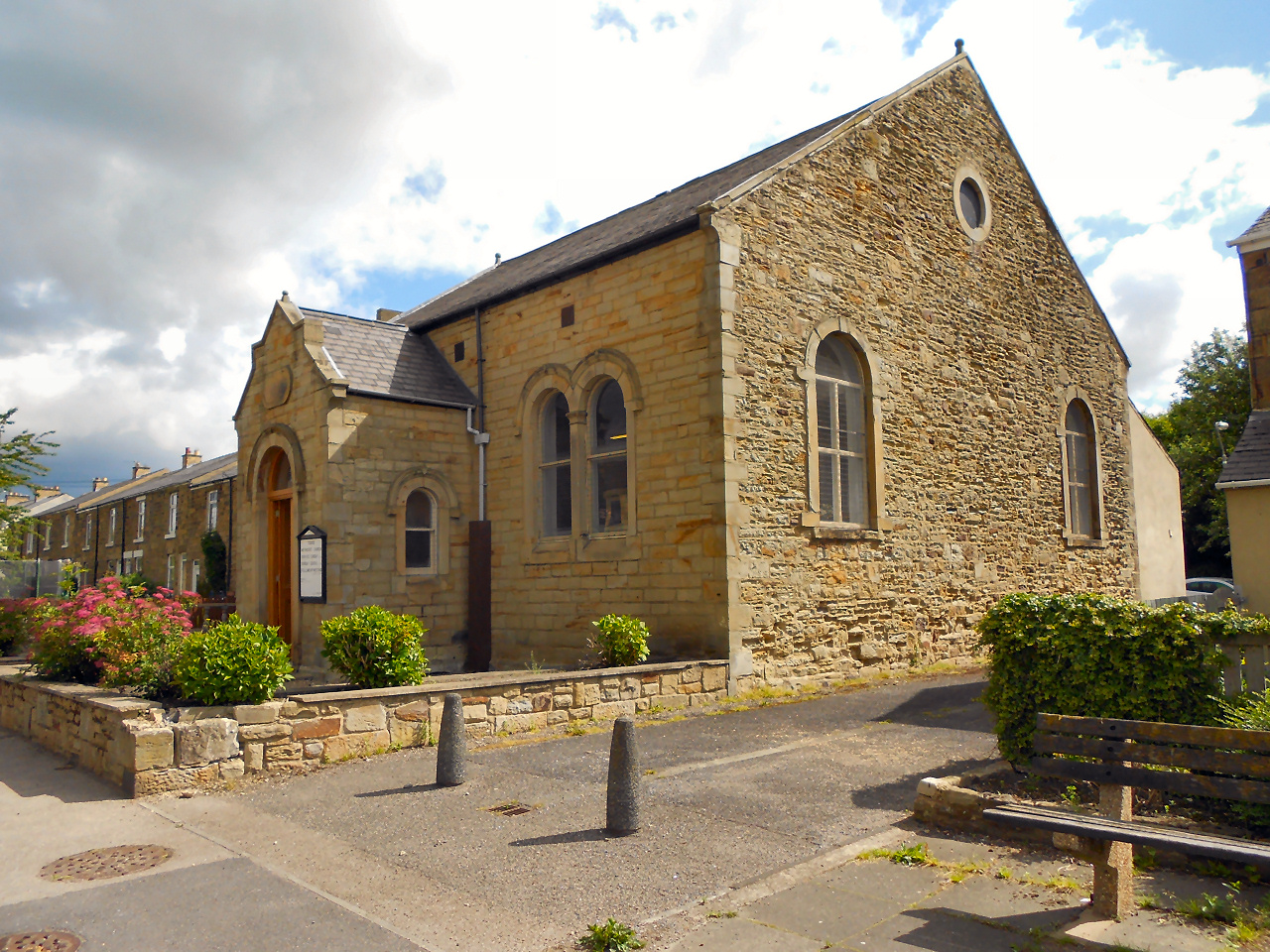

- Location within County Durham
- Population: 8,976 (2011.Ward)
- OS grid reference: NZ265349
- Civil parish: Spennymoor
- Unitary authority: County Durham
- Ceremonial county: Durham
- Region: North East
- Country: England
- Sovereign state: United Kingdom
- Post town: SPENNYMOOR
- Postcode district: DL16
- Police: Durham
- Fire: County Durham and Darlington
- Ambulance: North East
- UK Parliament: Newton Aycliffe and Spennymoor

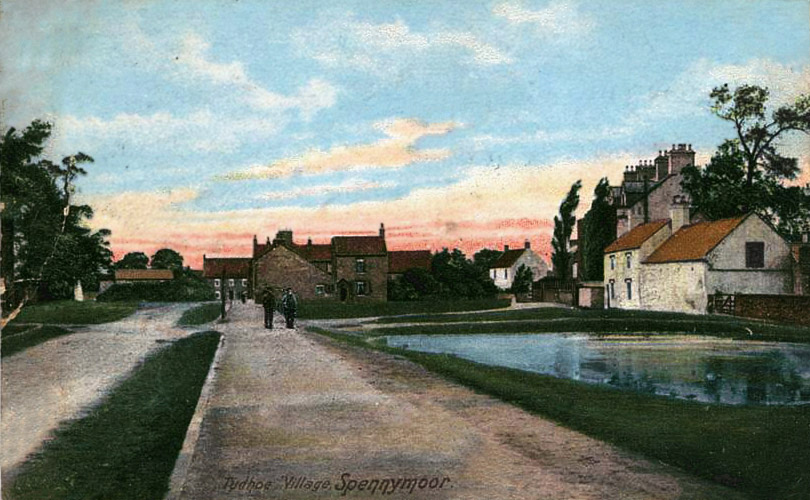

Tudhoe is a village in the civil parish of Spennymoor, in County Durham, England, just outside the town of Spennymoor.

== Governance ==
Tudhoe was formerly a township and chapelry in the parish of Brancepeth, in 1866 Tudhoe became a separate civil parish, on 1 April 1937 the parish was abolished and merged with Spennymoor. In 1931 the parish had a population of 6865.
