= Spennymoor =

Town in County Durham, England

Coordinates: 54.70°N 1.59°W

- Town and civil parish
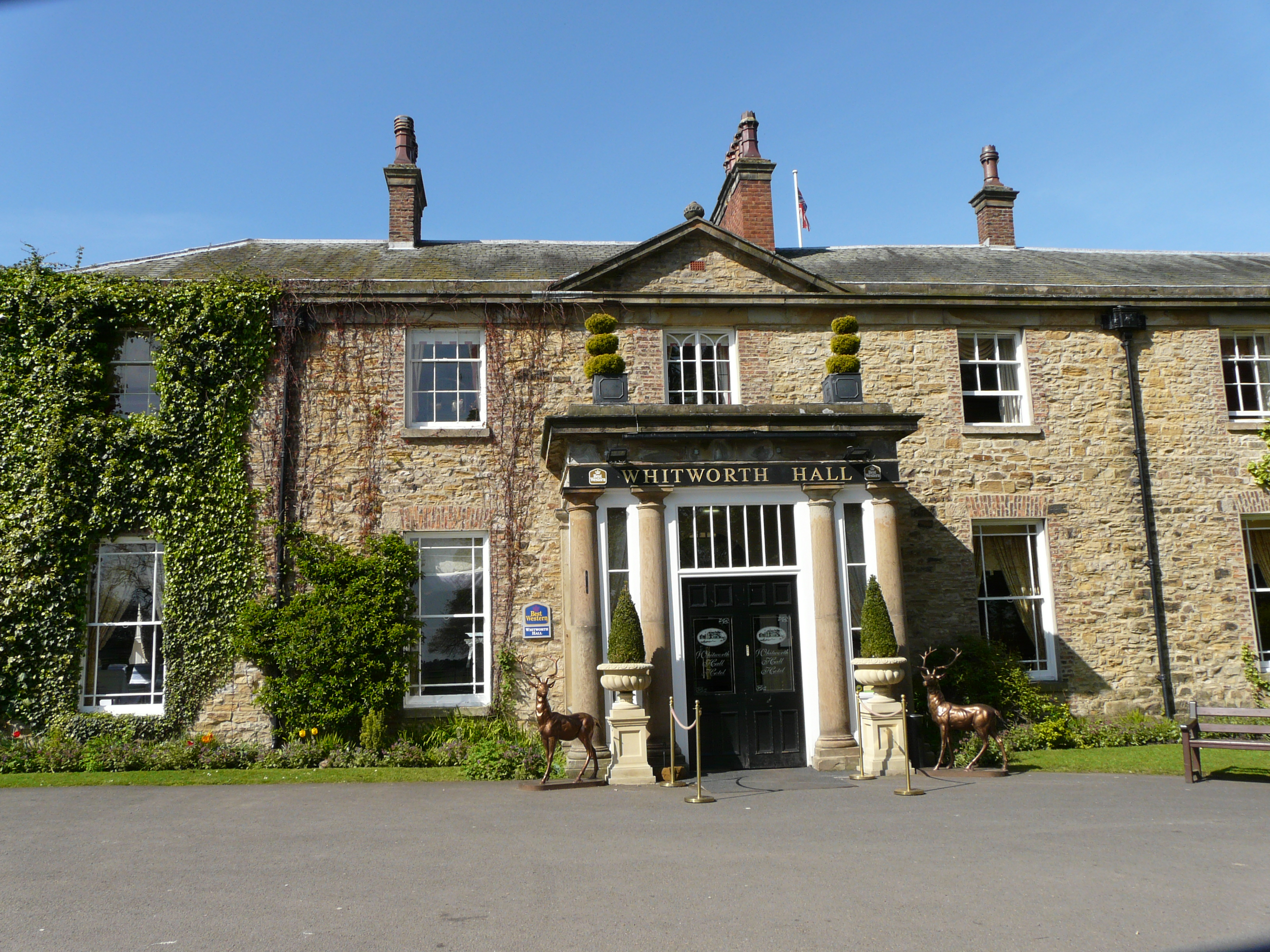
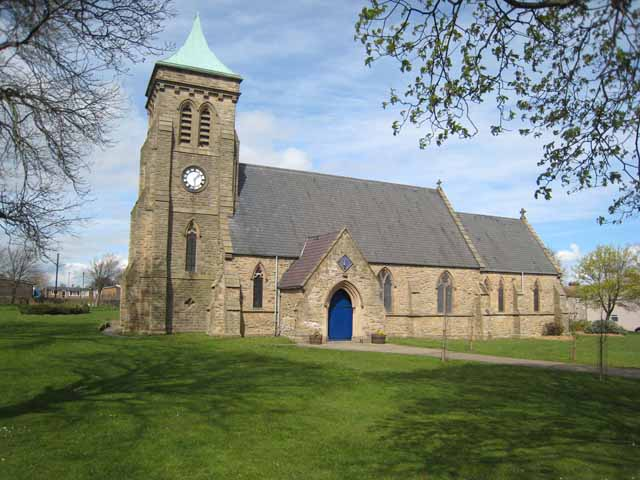
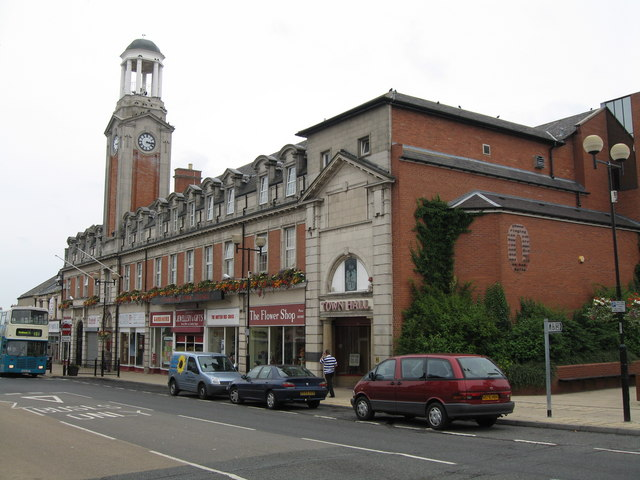
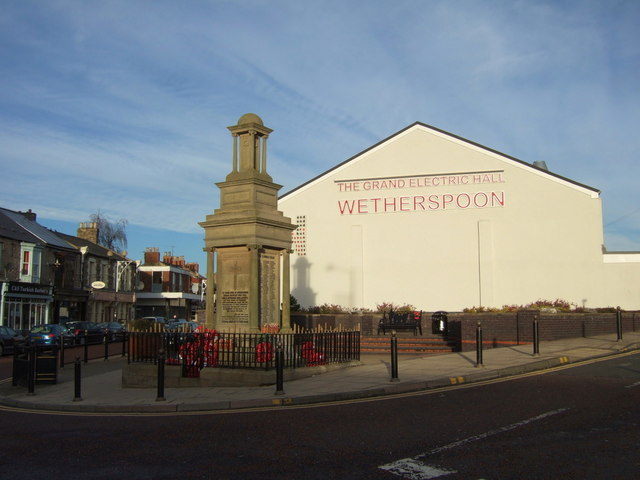
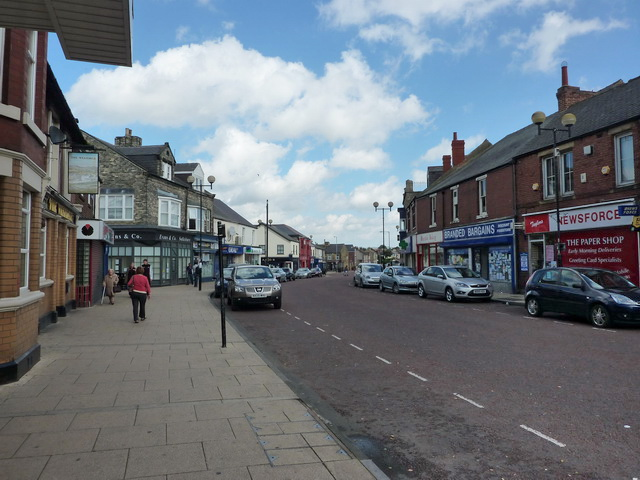
- Whitworth Hall St Paul’s Church Spennymoor Town Hall War Memorial Cheapside

- The town council arms Motto: SPE NEMO RUET "With hope, no one shall fail"

- Location within County Durham
- Population: 19,816 (2011 Census)
- OS grid reference: NZ261340
- Civil parish: Spennymoor
- Unitary authority: County Durham
- Ceremonial county: County Durham
- Region: North East
- Country: England
- Sovereign state: United Kingdom
- Post town: SPENNYMOOR
- Postcode district: DL16
- Dialling code: 01388
- Police: Durham
- Fire: County Durham and Darlington
- Ambulance: North East
- UK Parliament: Newton Aycliffe and Spennymoor

Spennymoor is a town and civil parish in County Durham, England. It is south of the River Wear and is 7 mi (11 km) south of Durham. The civil parish includes the villages of Kirk Merrington, Middlestone Moor, Byers Green and Tudhoe. In 2011 the parish had a population of 19,816.

== History ==
=== Origins ===
The land on which Spennymoor now stands was once a vast expanse of moorland covered with thorn and whin bushes (Spenny Moor). In 1336 its place-name was recorded as Spendingmor. The name is probably derived from the Old English or Old Norse spenning and mōr, meaning a moor with a fence or enclosure.

Another theory of the place-name's origin is from the Latin spina, meaning thorn (possibly from the Roman influence at Binchester) combined with the Old English or Old Norse mōr. CE Jackson, in his Place Names of Durham published in 1916 suggested a combination of the Old Norse spaan with Old English mar, meaning the moor named after the shingle-hut erected thereon.

Neither Britons nor Romans cultivated the moor, but on the site of Binchester, a village about 5 miles (8 km) to the southwest, the Romans built a camp around which grew up the settlement of Vinovia. The name Binchester is the usual Old English corruption or adaptation of the Roman site name.

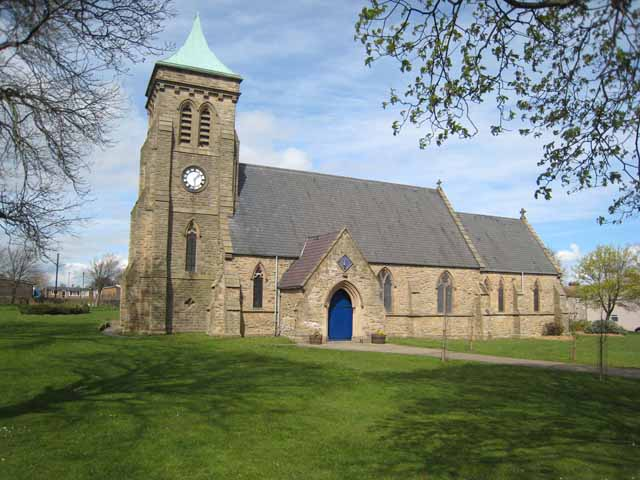
St Paul's Church

This fortress must have been of great strength, for it stood on a height above the River Wear; many coins, urns, altars and pieces of Roman pottery have been found, as well as the remains of a hypocaust of the heating system. Later, Binchester became one of the "vills" of the Earl of Northumberland who held it until 1420 when it passed to the Nevilles who finally forfeited it with other lands in 1569. As is to be expected, the moor itself offers little of historical interest but it is linked with the records of Kirk Merrington, Whitworth Old Park, Binchester, Byers Green and Tudhoe, all of which form a part of the early days of Spennymoor. All these villages had common rights on the moor but, as it became denuded by increasing flocks, some of the local people were induced to relinquish their rights and so, gradually, the common became the property of just one owner – Merrington Priory. The Manor of Merrington belonged successively to the priors, monks and dean and chapter of Durham Cathedral.

Today, Merrington church is one of the most prominent local landmarks. It was originally built by the Normans and its splendid strategic position led to it being fortified in 1143 by the Scots intruder, William Cumyn. When he was finally attacked and overcome, the church roof was destroyed but the building remained as one of the most interesting Norman churches in the county until 1850 when it was almost wholly rebuilt – although retaining the form of its predecessor. Inside, the most interesting feature is the screen, a typical example of late-17th-century work.

=== Troubled years ===
The Norman Conquest meant little to the border folk at first, for they had lived with the constant threat of massacre by raiding Picts and Danes, but then William's soldiers "laid waite" the county and distributed the Saxon nobles' estates among themselves. However, William allowed some of the previous owners to retain their lands, and one of these was Whittleworth – now Whitworth – whose first known proprietor was Thomas de Acle who held it in 1183. Nevertheless, the whole of this countryside was made desolate by William's soldiers, and for many years it was the haunt of outlaws and wild animals.

On 16 October 1346 David of Scotland was encamped with a great army on the hills near Durham, and raiding bands under a Douglas had been terrorising the neighbourhood. Edward lll was otherwise engaged at Crecy in France at the time, but his Queen, Phillipa, with the Archbishop of York, the Bishops of Durham, Lincoln and Carlisle, and the Lords Neville and Percy and others marched North, and with an array of 16,000 men, moved along the ridge from Auckland to Merrington. Her advance guards clashed with some of Douglas' men near Ferryhill and chased them back to the bridge at Croxdale (Sunderland Bridge). Butchers Race, one of the Five Lanes which meet at Tudhoe Crossroads, was so named after this foray. The next day the main bodies of the two armies met at Neville's Cross, near Durham, and the Scots were slaughtered. During the battle, the prior from Durham and his monks knelt on a little hillock in the Shaw Wood and prayed for an English victory while holding aloft, impaled on a spear, the Holy Corporax Cloth from the Cathedral.

In 1420 the Manor of Whitworth and much of the other land in the vicinity, from Raby to Brancepeth, and including Old Park, Byers Green, Newfield and Tudhoe, became Neville property, and the Earl of Westmorland (a Neville) was granted a licence from Bishop Langley to impark 40 acres at Whitworth, and so began the Whitworth park of today.

The moor itself comes into the record in 1615 as the result of "a general muster on the moor of all men able to bear arms within the bishopric, between the ages of 15 and 60; the gathering amounted to 8,320" (Fordyce). Some military training seems to have been given, doubtless with a view to the then unsettled state of the country due to the growing tension between Parliament and the King. Quite a few of these men must have been miners, as at that time "coale pits" were being worked at Whitworth, Byers Green and Fernhill. In 1677 the small freeholders and the local gentry divided 243 acres of the moor between themselves, an act which was confirmed by the Chancery Court. The only portion of the common that was left was a small plot reserved for the use of a spring of water.

=== The rise of industry ===
Up to 1800 the moor remained largely barren and the few roads across it were dangerous. The one good road was maintained by tolls collected at turnpike gates. Some of the largest horse-race meetings in the North took place on the moor, and miners and their families attended in all their holiday splendour. These men, early industrial workers, wore their hair long and on these gala days it flowed freely over their shoulders instead of, as usually was the case, being tied in curls. Floral waistcoats and ribboned hats were worn on these highly colourful occasions.

Modern Spennymoor was built on mining and has its origins with the sinking of the Wittered pit in 1839. Rough houses were built for the pit workers – houses with two rooms and a loft, more like "piggeries than human habitation" according to Dodd. The first coal from Merrington Colliery was brought up in 1841; a pit with a chequered career which only prospered under the partnership of L.M Reay and R.S. Johnson, who made a fortune out of it. The trade depression of the late 19th century, however, caused its closure in 1882.

The coal mining at Whitworth and a small foundry at Merrington Lane were the earliest industries, but in 1853 the Weardale Iron and Coal Company opened its great ironworks at Tudhoe. As a result, many hundreds of immigrant workers came here from the Midlands and more rows of dark little houses were erected. More workers came from Wales and Lancashire, with the opening of the mine at Page Bank (ten people died in a pit fire here in 1858), and with the sinking of a new pit at Tudhoe in the 1880s. The latter resulted in colliery workers' houses springing up on the main Durham road. Slightly before that, in the 1860s, a rather advanced area of working-class housing had been erected at Tudhoe Grange, built by Marmaduke Salvin to house local workers. These houses were, unusually, semi-detached and arranged in a chequerboard layout, in contrast to the dreary terraces that were then the standard.

Although these days of rapid industrialisation and rapid growth of population were days of ignorance and squalor, they also saw the 19th-century drive for education and religion. A National School was built and opened in 1841; St Paul's Church was built at Spennymoor in 1858 and all through these formative years the Non-conformist churches combined welfare work with prayer. An era of prosperity dawned in the 1860s and 1870s when the miners were earning £1 per day. Spennymoor was ringed with collieries, black furnaces and coke ovens and the new prosperity showed itself in the building of better houses and in the opening of Co-operative stores. The comparative isolation of its moorland situation ended too with the opening of a branch railway from the mainline at Ferryhill in 1876.

However, as always in industrial life, boom was followed by "bust" – or "near bust", and by 1879 miners' wages were down to 4s 9d a day and those of ironworkers to a mere 3s a day. On top of these economic misfortunes came the terrible explosion at Tudhoe Colliery in 1882 when 37 people died. A strike, which lasted 13 weeks, paralysed the area in 1892, although out of the enforced idleness came foundations of new growth, for the machinery at the Tudhoe Iron works was then renovated and a new mill laid down. The works then possessed the largest mill in Europe, capable of rolling plates up to 13 feet in width.

=== 20th century ===
When, in 1894, Spennymoor and its adjacent villages achieved a measure of self-government on the Spennymoor Urban District Council, the new authority found itself facing a legacy of poor housing. With few exceptions, the housing situation was little better than when Dodd had described the houses as "more like piggeries". In 1874 the then Local Government Board had reported: "Nothing could well exceed the nuisance attendant on the disposal of excrement and refuse in Spennymoor. There are entire streets without any closet accommodation whatever and in its stead open wooden boxes are placed opposite nearly every doorway for the reception of the excrement, ashes and other refuse; an arrangement which, besides being revolting to every sense of decency, is stated to be offensive in the extreme, especially in hot weather. It is impossible to walk between the rows of cottages without being convinced that the surface of the ground is to a large extent composed of the overflowing contents of these midden boxes. The back streets stand deep in filth and mud." These appalling conditions continued into the 20th century and even by 1920 fewer than 10% of the town houses had water closets. In 1923 only four houses were built and there was still massive overcrowding in back to back properties. In the next few years only between one and four houses were built in any year and in 1929 the housing situation was still reported as acute which, from the recorded facts, seems self-evident.

These squalid conditions were paralleled by the ever-uncertain economic conditions in industry. Although coal-mining continued and the ironworks and engineering businesses were also providing employment, the start of the 20th century saw the start, too, of a long period of depression. The first blow was the closure in 1901 of the ironworks which had been rendered obsolete by the pace of change elsewhere. The effect of the closure was relieved by the sinking of the Dean and Chapter colliery in 1904, but the reliance on this one basic industry was to persist until the 1960s. Even before the big coal strike of 1926 the collieries had begun to close. Three closed in 1924 and the strike saw another two fail. Spennymoor became part of the South West Durham depressed area. Although schemes were inaugurated to relieve the gloom nothing could make up for the lack of steady employment. In 1930 the coke ovens which remained on the ironworks site were only working intermittently. Even by 1938 the situation had improved little. The Cleveland iron trade, which used the coal and coke produced at Spennymoor, was depressed. The production of these raw materials at Coulson's engineering works, Kenmir's furniture factory and newly opened brickworks at Todhills were the main, if limited, sources of employment. Unemployment was over 33%.

=== Modern era ===
Despite the high levels of unemployment, the housing situation at last took an upturn in the 1930s when the Urban District Council began to use its wider powers to take action on unfit houses. By 1935 the first 66 Council houses had been built, and a year later the first 106 North Eastern Housing Association houses were erected on the Racecourse Estate site. Although these were the only houses built before the war, they did provide some hope and allowed the clearance of some of the worst of the squalid areas. Nevertheless, the situation remained bad and there were still far too many damp, badly lit and ventilated houses opening onto small paved yards or back streets.

World War II had diverse effects upon the town. On the one hand it brought housing efforts almost to a standstill, but on the industry front it saw the resurgence of Spennymoor as a major centre. The main factor was the opening in 1941 of a Royal Ordnance Factory at Merrington Lane and since then this estate has provided a constant source of alternative employment to the coal industry. The end of World War II, however, saw this industrial activity greatly curtailed and hard times returned, although without the severity of the earlier pre-war years. The run-down of the mining industry, however, was nevertheless a serious blow.

On 24 December 1944, Tudhoe's cricket ground was hit by a rogue V-1 flying bomb, which had been air-launched by a German Heinkel He 111 and was aimed at Manchester. The explosion cratered the field and blew out the windows of surrounding houses and of St Charles' Church. This was the furthest north any V-1 landed during World War II.

In 1963 changes were indicated and Durham County Council and then Ministry of Housing and Local Government agreed that Spennymoor should be a new "growth point" and that town centre redevelopment should take place; that the Tudhoe ironworks site should be reclaimed; that a major highway scheme should be put into hand; that the Royal Ordnance Factory Industrial Estate should be extended and that the Green Lane Industrial Estate should be developed.

Spennymoor shared some brief film success in the early 90's with the production of 'Anymore for Spennymore' starring a few of the locals.

There were, of course, early problems, but the new industries became established and, in most cases, began to expand. The coal industry has been replaced by manufacturers of consumer goods, and factories of Electrolux, Thorn Lighting and Black and Decker were established. Rothmans International also had a cigarette factory, employing more than 400 people, in Spennymoor from circa 1980 up until 2000.

Housing, too, has made great strides since the end of the War. By the end of 1963 over 1,120 sub-standard houses had been cleared and as many new Council houses built for letting – whilst over 400 houses had been improved by grant aid. In 1963 too there came the first private building developments to take place since back in the days of the 19th-century colliery owners. The 800 house estate at Greenways and the 300 house estate at Tudhoe Grange were started, although it was not until the industrial prosperity of the 1970s that private house building reached 100 a year.

The greatest project came with the development of the Tudhoe ironworks site – 70 acres that was turned into the Bessemer Park Housing Estate. In 1968 work commenced on blocks of flats and houses there (comprising 1,009 household units in total) and this allowed the clearance of 500 unfit houses as well as the provision of housing for workers coming to the new factories. The blocks of flats on the Bessemer Park Housing Estate were subsequently demolished in the 1980s, due to serious problems with damp in the flats that rendered them extremely unpopular with tenants.

In 1966 the town opened a new bus station, between Cambridge Street and Silver Street, to relieve traffic congestion on the High Street. This bus station was subsequently redeveloped as a car park circa 1990. Also in 1966, the nearby Parkwood Shopping Precinct (which included a Woolworths and a supermarket) was opened. In 2016 it was announced that the Parkwood Precinct would be substantially redeveloped due to low tenancy rates in the shops, an escalating issue since the turn of the millennium.

== Transport ==
Spennymoor railway station opened in November 1845 and operated under several different companies before the nationalisation of Britain's railways. It closed on 31 March 1952.

Buses continue to serve Spennymoor, most notably the thrice-per-hour Arriva North East route 6 between Durham and Bishop Auckland, as well as the twice-per-hour Go North East limited-stop route X21 between Newcastle and Bishop Auckland.

== Media ==
Local news and television programmes are provided by BBC North East and Cumbria and ITV Tyne Tees. Television signals are received from the Pontop Pike TV transmitter. Local radio stations are BBC Radio Newcastle, Capital North East, Heart North East, Smooth North East, Sun FM, Greatest Hits Radio North East, Durham On Air and Bishop FM, a community based station which broadcast from Bishop Auckland. The town is served by the local newspapers, The Northern Echo and South West Durham News.

== Notable people ==
- John Bain, video game commentator and consumer rights advocate, lived and went to school in the town.
- Actor Gibson Gowland, was born in the town.
- Anne Wood, creator of the Teletubbies and In The Night Garden, was born and brought up in Spennymoor.
- Chloe Castro, singer and songwriter.
- Norman Cornish (18 November 1919 – 1 August 2014) was an English mining artist.
- George Courtney, football referee.

== Politics ==
Spennymoor had elected Labour MPs for many years, but in recent times the area has become more marginal. From 1918 to 1950 it had its own parliamentary constituency, from 1950 to 1974 it was in the Durham constituency and from 1974 to 1983 in the North West Durham constituency. From 1983 to 1997 it was part of the Sedgefield constituency; during this time the MP was Tony Blair, who was Leader of the Opposition for the last three years of his tenure as the town's MP. The town had been moved out of the constituency by the time Blair became Prime Minister. Since 1997 it has been part of the Bishop Auckland constituency, whose MP from 2005 to 2019 was Helen Goodman, from the Labour Party. In 2019 the seat elected its first Conservative MP, Dehenna Davison.

Spennymoor returns 5 County Councillors to Durham County Council from two Electoral Divisions covering the town, and its constituent villages. Tudhoe Division covers Tudhoe Village, Tudhoe Moor, and Low Spennymoor. Spennymoor Division covers Spennymoor, Middlestone Moor, and Byers Green.

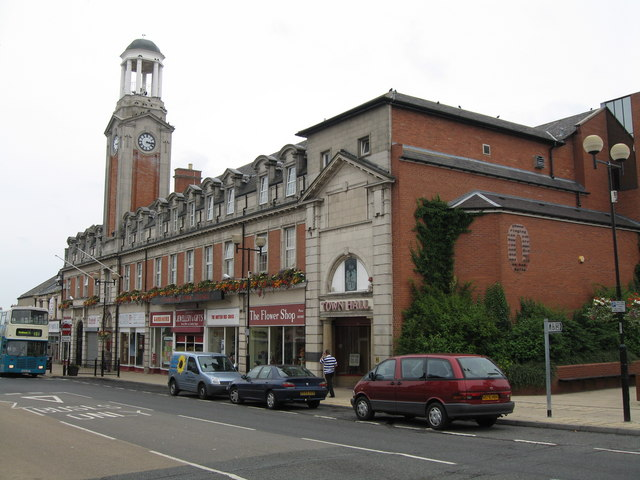
Spennymoor Town Hall

Spennymoor also has its own Town Council, Spennymoor Town Council, which provides local services such as Jubilee Park, the Spennymoor Town Hall, Allotments and various play areas and community centres throughout the Town.

== Landmarks ==
=== Whitworth Hall ===
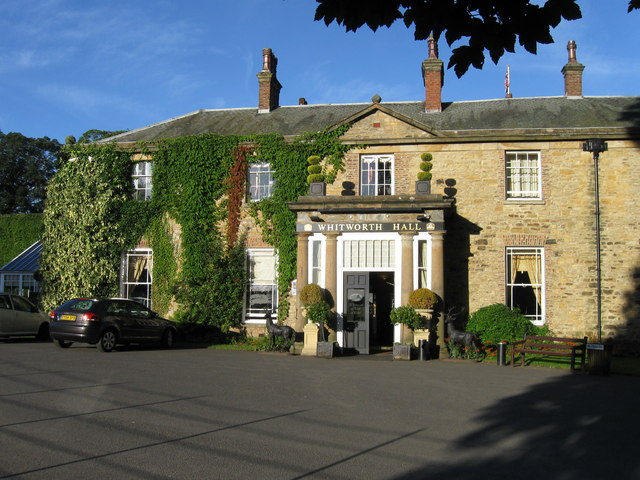
Whitworth Hall

Dating from 1183, the Whitworth Hall estate was owned by and home to the Shafto family for over 300 years, including County Durham MP "Bonnie Bobby Shafto", made famous by the well known ballad and nursery rhyme. It is now the site of Whitworth Hall Hotel and the deer park for which the estate is famed is still well tended, as is the walled garden.

=== Spennymoor Settlement ===
A local arts community founded in the 1930s by Bill & Betty Farrell with the aid of the Pilgrim Trust, "To encourage tolerant neighbourliness and voluntary social services and give its members opportunities for increasing their knowledge, widening their interests, and cultivating their creative powers in a friendly atmosphere". The Settlement was home to the town's first library, and amongst famous local people who were a part of its history were Norman Cornish, "the pitman painter" and Shildon-born writer Sid Chaplin. The building is a centre for the arts- mostly drama and music, but other community events take place here.

=== Durham Mining Museum ===

The Durham Mining Museum is housed in Spennymoor Town Hall, and covers mining in the north of England - mines in the historic counties of County Durham, Northumberland, Cumberland, and Westmorland, and North Yorkshire's ironstone mines. The displays comprise three sections: a display of small mining artefacts, models of larger machines, and a simulation of a mine tunnel for visitors to experience. It was opened in 1998, has been a registered charity since 2000, and is supported by a Friends group. Its display rooms are open to the public on weekdays and Saturdays except bank holidays, and it maintains a website holding a large amount of archive material. The museum is "dedicated to the memory of more than 24,000 men, women and children who have lost their lives in mining related accidents in the North of England since 1293".

== Miners' banner ==
A new banner was marched for the first time in the 2006 Durham Miners' Gala (The Big Meeting), representing 13 (former) local collieries. The banner was unfurled on the night before the big meeting, by MEP Stephen Hughes and long-time trade unionist Rodney Bickerstaffe, General Secretary of the trade union UNISON from 1995 to 2001. Its first outing on the following day began with visits to 'The Tubs', a miners' memorial made from tubs once used underground in Ellington Colliery, Northumberland, which honours the memory of all of the men and boys who died in the mines of Spennymoor and district, then went on to two war memorials, the main cenotaph outside the leisure centre and a smaller memorial in Tudhoe Cemetery.

== Facilities and sport ==
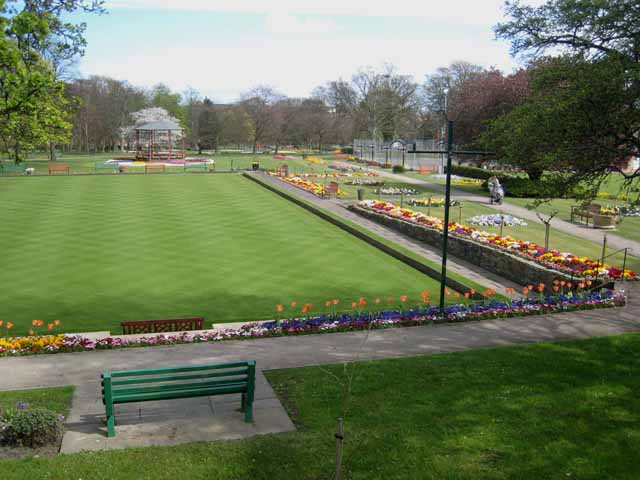
Jubilee Park

The main attraction in Spennymoor is Victoria Jubilee Park which was given to the people of the town by Queen Victoria to celebrate the jubilee of her reign, and is sited on land which was once part of the Whitworth Hall estate of the Shafto family. Until World War II there was a cannon from the Crimean War on display in the park, this was taken away to be melted down for munitions. A Millennium arch was erected in the park.

The leisure centre houses a swimming pool, and offers swimming lessons, football coaching, martial arts tutoring, fitness classes, multi sensory room, badminton practice, a Lifestyle Fitness gym and gymnastic workouts and is also home to Regional Gymnasium Centre, made possible by funding from the National Lottery, Sport England and Sedgefield Borough Council, and is amongst the most modern in the country. There are also plans for a new regional arts centre to be added to the leisure centre, which stands at the junction of High Street and Cheapside in the town centre.

Spennymoor Town F.C. are the main local football team and won the FA Vase in 2013, after winning 2–1 in the final at Wembley Stadium against Tunbridge Wells.
