= Whitworth Hall, County Durham =

Whitworth Hall Hotel & Deer Park
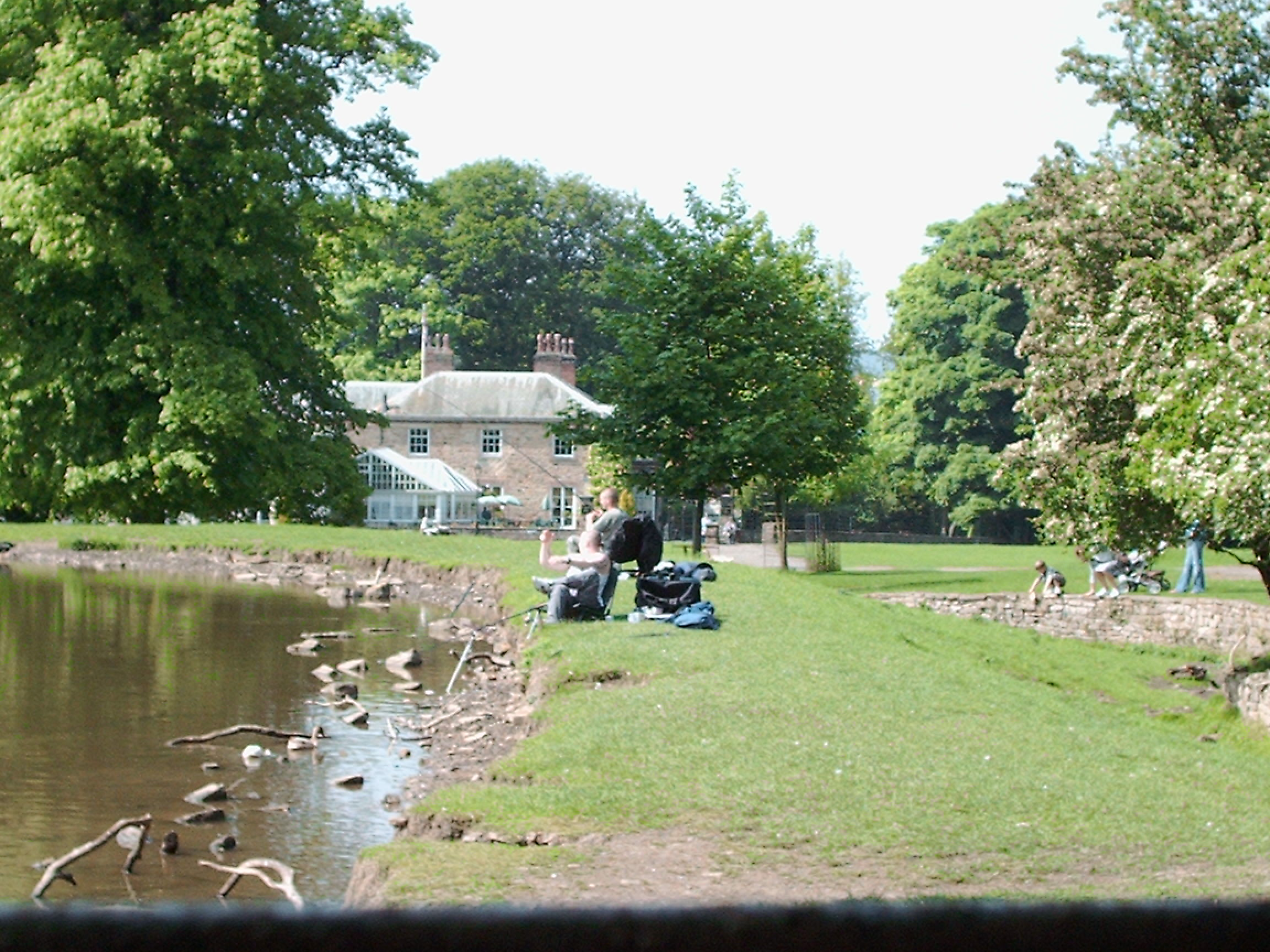

- Location in County Durham

General information
- Location: Stanner's Lane, Spennymoor, County Durham DL16 7QX, England
- Coordinates: 54.707°N 1.633°W
- OS grid: NZ237347

Whitworth Hall which stands in Whitworth Hall Country Park, near Spennymoor, County Durham England, is a country house, formerly the home of the Shafto family and now a hotel. It is a listed building.

Descendants of the Shafto family of Shafto Crag, Northumberland, served as Aldermen, Mayors and Sheriffs of Newcastle upon Tyne in the 16th and 17th centuries. In 1652 Mark Shafto, Recorder of Newcastle, purchased the manor of Whitworth. His son Robert, knighted in 1670 was Recorder from 1660 and his grandson was High Sheriff of Durham in 1709.

Two sons of Mark Shafto junior represented Durham City in Parliament: Robert Shafto 1712/3 and 1727/30 and John Shafto 1729-42. John was the father of Robert Shafto, better known as Bobby Shaftoe, who vastly increased the family fortune by his marriage in 1774 to Anne Duncombe of Duncombe Park. Their son Robert Eden Duncombe Shafto, (also Member of Parliament for Durham City and later High Sheriff in 1842), who married Catherine Eden, daughter of Sir John Eden Bt of Windlestone Hall, replaced the old manor house with a new mansion in 1845. The house was substantially destroyed by fire and all that now remains of the 1845 rebuild is the detached library wing. The present two-storey seven-bayed house dates from the rebuild of about 1900.

Branches of the Shafto family had seats at Bavington Hall, Beamish Hall and Windlestone Hall.

In the 21st century Whitworth Hall has been operated as a hotel and wedding venue and has formed part of the Apartment Group’s portfolio of wedding venues in the North East.
