= Robert Heslop =

English footballer (1907–1969)

Personal information
- Full name: Robert Heslop
- Date of birth: 5 February 1907
- Place of birth: Annfield Plain, England
- Date of death: 1969 (aged 61–62)
- Height: 5 ft 6 in (1.68 m)
- Position: Inside forward

Senior career*
Years	Team	Apps	(Gls)
1925–1926	South Pontop Villa		
1926–1927	Annfield Plain		
1927–1928	Burnley	0	(0)
1928	Annfield Plain		
1928–1934	Nottingham Forest	92	(23)
1934	Annfield Plain		
1934	Bishop Auckland		
1935–1939	Gateshead	95	(13)
1939	Bedlington United		
Total		187	(36)
- * Club domestic league appearances and goals

Robert Heslop (5 February 1907 – 1969) was an English footballer who played in the Football League for Gateshead and Nottingham Forest.
