= St Mary's Church, Norton =

- St Mary the Virgin
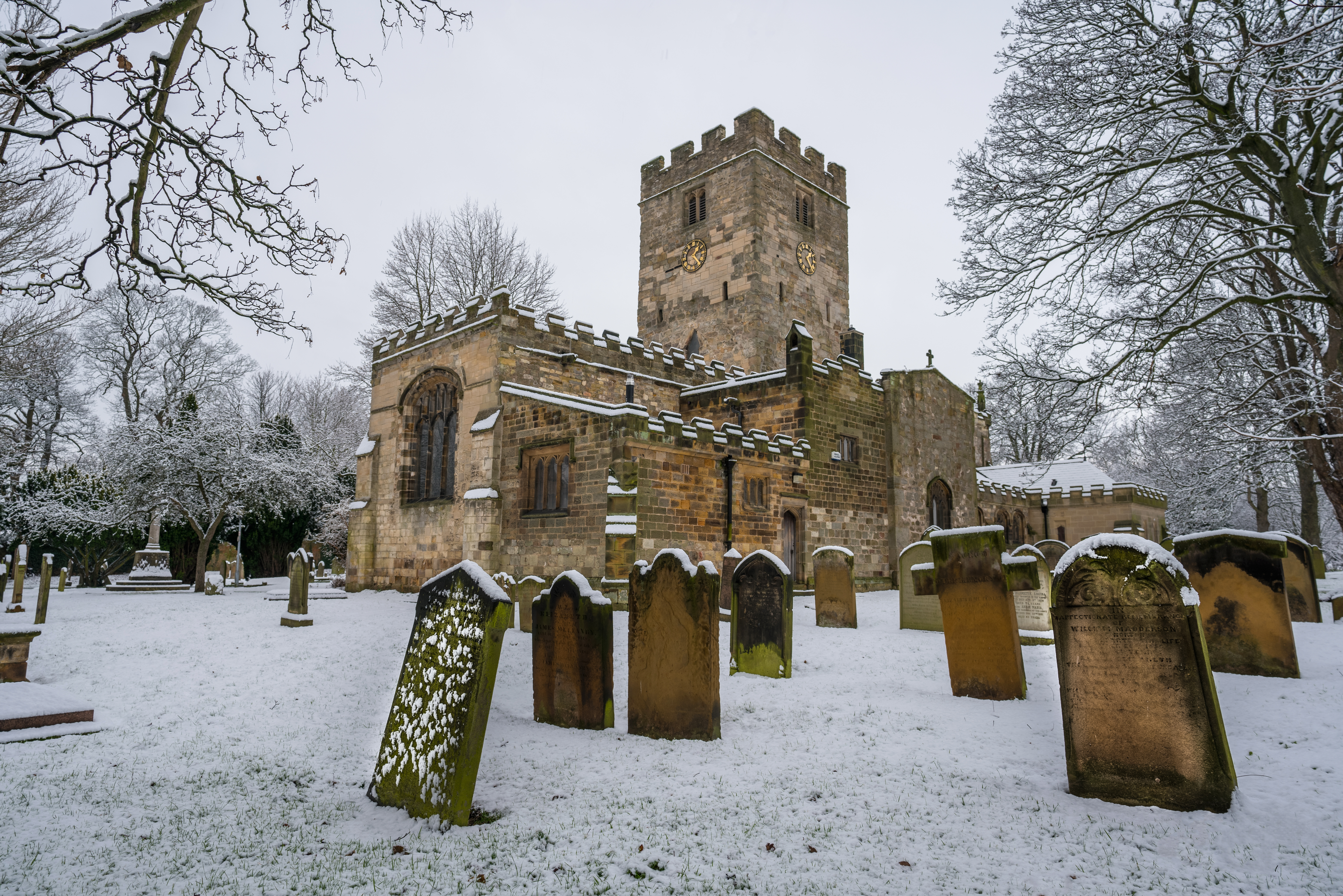
- St Mary's Church, Norton
- 54°35′33″N 1°18′59″W
- OS grid reference: NZ 44277 22134
- Location: The Green, Norton, Stockton-on-Tees TS20 1EJ
- Country: England
- Denomination: Church of England
- Website: www.stmarysnorton.co.uk

History
- Status: Active
- Founded: 1020
- Dedication: St Mary the Virgin

Architecture
- Functional status: Parish church
- Heritage designation: Grade I

Administration
- Diocese: Diocese of Durham
- Archdeaconry: Archdeaconry of Auckland
- Deanery: Stockton

Clergy
- Vicar: Martin Anderson

St Mary's Church, Norton, is an ancient parish church located on the village green of Norton, County Durham. It is the only cruciform Anglo-Saxon church in northern England and a Grade I listed building.

== History ==
=== Early Christian Roots ===
Christianity reached the Tees Valley in the early 7th century, when missionaries from Lindisfarne, including St Aidan, brought the Christian faith to Northumbria. The influence of St Cuthbert further established Christian worship throughout the region. By the early 11th century, Norton had become an important ecclesiastical centre. The village and its people were granted to St Cuthbert at Durham, as recorded in the Liber Vitae:

“7 ic Ulfcytel Osulfes sunu sylle Norðtun mið mete & mið mannan into S’ce Cuðberhte 7 all ðer into hyreð mið sace 7 mið socne 7 se ðe þis aþende sy he ascyred from Godes dæde 7 from eallum haligdome.”

This dedication established Norton as a place of worship and sanctuary around 1020 AD.

=== Foundation and Collegiate Period ===
Around 1020, St Mary’s Church was founded as one of the earliest stone-built cruciform churches in northern England. In 1083, Bishop William of St Calais (also known as Bishop Carileph) re-established Norton as a collegiate church by papal rescript. He relocated secular canons from Durham to Norton, assigning a vicar and eight canons to maintain daily services. The church thus became known as *The Collegiate and Parish Church of St Mary the Virgin, Our Lady of the Assumption*.

The emblem of the Assumption—a heart pierced by a sword and flanked by golden wings—remains the church’s symbol today. From 1083 until the Reformation, the collegiate community upheld the full cycle of masses and offices as part of its daily worship.

=== The Mother Church of the Parish ===
For centuries, St Mary’s served as the Mother Church of a large parish encompassing Stockton, Preston, and Hartburn. Parishioners from the surrounding area gathered annually on August 15, the Feast of the Assumption, to pay their dues and attend the main mass of the year. A chapel was later built in Stockton in 1236 to serve the growing population, though Stockton did not become a separate parish until 1713.

=== The Saxon Church and Its Development ===
The original Saxon church was built in stone and designed in a cruciform layout, with the nave, chancel, and transepts roughly equal in size. Early worshippers stood during the Latin mass, as seating was not yet customary. The floor was covered with straw, and the transepts each contained a chapel with its own altar.

As Norton’s population expanded over the centuries, the church underwent several enlargements and modifications. These included the extension of the nave, the addition of later medieval features such as the battlemented tower, and the installation of stained glass and stone effigies reflecting the influence of regional noble families.

=== Post-Reformation and Modern Era ===
Following the Reformation, the collegiate structure was dissolved, and St Mary’s continued as a parish church within the Church of England. Restoration efforts over the centuries have preserved much of its early Saxon and Norman fabric. Excavations beneath the floor during recent renovations revealed Saxon remains and artefacts near the entrance of a medieval drainage tunnel, reinforcing the church’s ancient origins.

Today, St Mary’s Church remains a central landmark on Norton Green, serving as both a place of worship and a symbol of the region’s enduring Christian heritage.

== Design ==
The church features a crossing tower with eight triangular-headed windows and a battlemented top, added in a later period.

Beneath the church floor lies a tunnel that local tradition claims was used by Saxons and priests as an escape route in times of danger. Scholars, however, believe it is more likely to have been constructed as a drainage culvert. The tunnel is said to extend under Norton Green and re-emerge in the Albany housing estate. During recent renovations of the church floor, Saxon remains and artefacts were discovered near the tunnel entrance.

=== North Transept and the Knight Effigy ===
The north transept, originally known as the "Blakiston Porch", contains the burial vault of the Blakiston family beneath its floor. A survey of 1555 records that Sir William Blakiston endowed £4 per annum for twenty years to support a mass priest, suggesting the transept served as his chantry chapel.

Within the transept lies a knight effigy. The shield bears the arms of Sir William Blakiston, who married in 1575. However, the mason's mark "I OOO" on the slab corresponds to John Cheyne, a fourteenth-century mason, and the additional shields of Langton and Fulthorpe suggest that the monument originally commemorated Sir Roger Fulthorpe, who died in 1337. It is thought that Sir William Blakiston appropriated the effigy by erasing its original arms and replacing them with his own.

The transept also contains a broken piscina, indicating the historical presence of an altar, likely associated with the chantry. The stained-glass windows above the effigy depict Saint Cuthbert, Saint Aidan, and Saint Bede, who are collectively regarded as the “three saints of the North.”

=== Tower ===
The tower stands over the crossing and is notable for its eight triangular-headed windows. Its battlemented parapet is a later medieval addition, distinguishing it from earlier Norman and Saxon work in the structure.

=== Tunnel and Renovations ===
Beneath the nave floor is the entrance to a tunnel that has long been associated with escape legends. Although local tradition attributes it to Saxon and medieval clerics, architectural historians suggest it is more plausibly a drainage feature. Excavations and floor renovations have uncovered Saxon remains and artefacts at the tunnel entrance, providing evidence of the church’s early origins.

== Churchyard ==
The churchyard of St Mary's, Norton, surrounds the building on the village green and contains graves dating from at least the early 18th century through the 20th century. Among the features of the churchyard is a Grade II listed World War I memorial cross, unveiled in 1921 to commemorate those who died in the First World War, with later additions honoring the fallen of the Second World War. Inside the church, there is also a memorial tablet behind the font under the west window listing local men who died in the Great War (1914–1919). The churchyard remains an important historical site, though records of recent burials are limited.

=== Notable Burials and Memorials ===
- John Walker (1781–1859) — Inventor of the friction match. His original gravestone at St Mary's Churchyard eventually deteriorated due to weathering, and in 1974 it was replaced with a replica headstone. The replacement stone marks his burial site in the churchyard, while the original gravestone is preserved at Preston Hall Museum.
- Jeremiah Moore (d. 20 July 1753, aged 57) — Buried near the west wall of St Mary's, his grave is marked by a headstone engraved with a skull and crossbones. Moore was formerly enslaved on a Turkish galley, rescued by the Royal Navy, and later settled in Norton. Contrary to popular local legend, the skull and crossbones motif is a typical 18th-century memento mori, symbolizing mortality and resurrection rather than piracy.
- The Hogg Family (19th–20th centuries) — Several members of the prominent Hogg family, influential landowners and merchants in Norton and Stockton, are buried in the churchyard. Their family tomb is Grade II listed, reflecting both its architectural significance and historical importance. The plot, located near the southern boundary of the churchyard, features substantial sandstone and granite monuments with ornate Victorian carvings and classical urn motifs. Among the best-known memorials is Thomas Hogg (1823–1898), a merchant and benefactor who contributed to parish restoration efforts. Later generations remained active in church life and local philanthropy, and the Hogg tomb remains one of the most distinctive in the churchyard.
- White Family Tomb (18th–19th centuries) — Located south of the Hogg vault, the White family tomb is a Grade II listed table tomb, commemorating several members with inscriptions dating to 1812. Constructed of sandstone with classical detailing, the tomb reflects funerary style of the late 18th and early 19th centuries and highlights the family’s historical involvement in local civic and religious life.

== Notable events ==
On 11 November 2006, entrepreneur and television personality Duncan Bannatyne married Joanne McCue at St Mary's Church, Norton. The ceremony was attended by several notable figures, including Anna Ryder Richardson, Cherie Lunghi, Gary McCausland, and fellow Dragons' Den investors Theo Paphitis, Richard Farleigh, Simon Woodroffe, and Deborah Meaden.
