= Granville Gibson (priest) =

British priest and convicted sex offender

George Granville Gibson (born 28 May 1936) is a retired British Anglican priest and convicted sex offender. He was the Archdeacon of Auckland in the Diocese of Durham from 1993 to 2001.

== Early life and education ==
Gibson was educated at Queen Elizabeth Grammar School, Wakefield and Barnsley College. He was a Mining Surveyor for the NCB from 1952 to 1962; then a Field Officer for Boys' Brigade from 1962 to 1969. He studied for ordination at Cuddesdon. He was ordained deacon in 1971 and priest in 1972.

== Ordained ministry ==
Gibson was a curate at St Paul's, Cullercoats from 1971 to 1973. After that he was Team Vicar of Cramlington from 1973 to 1977; Vicar of Newton Aycliffe from 1977 to 1985; and then Rector of St Michael and All Angels, Bishopwearmouth from 1985 until his appointment as Auckland. He was Interim Priest at St James the Great, Darlington from 2012 to 2014.

== Later life and conviction ==
Gibson was arrested in April 2014 in relation to historic sexual offences. In August 2016, he was found guilty of two counts of indecent assault, and also "not guilty of one serious sexual offence and four indecent assault charges". He had assaulted two men, who were 18 and 26 at the time of the offences, in the 1970s and 1980s when he was vicar at St Claire's Church, Newton Aycliffe. In October 2016, he was given a 12-month prison sentence.

In 2018, he was charged with three further counts of indecent assault in the 1980s. He denied the charges, but was convicted and sentenced to 10 months' imprisonment in July 2019. A 2017 independent report on the Diocese of Durham's handling of cases involving Gibson, which found that complaints about his behaviour had been dismissed as "drunkenness", and that he had been arrogant about his senior position in the Church, was published in December 2020. Gibson was jailed again for similar offences, for 21 months, in November 2022. The trial judge said that Gibson could have avoided this prosecution by admitting to these offences at either of his previous trials.

== Personal life ==
In 1958, Gibson married Edna (née Jackson), and they had three sons and a daughter. Edna died in 2016.
