= George Marchant (priest) =

British priest (1916–2006)

The Venerable George Marchant
- Archdeacon of Auckland
- Church: Church of England
- Diocese: Durham
- In office: 1974 to 1983
- Predecessor: Charles James Stranks
- Successor: Derek Hodgson

Orders
- Ordination: 1939 (deacon); 1940 (priest)

Personal details
- Born: George John Charles Marchant; 3 January 1916
- Died: 3 February 2006 (aged 90)
- Denomination: Anglicanism
- Education: St John's College, Durham; Tyndale Hall, Bristol

George John Charles Marchant (3 January 1916 – 3 February 2006) was a British Anglican priest. From 1974 to 1983, he was Archdeacon of Auckland in the Diocese of Durham. He had previously been Vicar of St Nicholas' Church, Durham (1954 to 1974), and before that ministered in the Diocese of London, the Diocese of Ely, and the Diocese of Lincoln.

== Early life and education ==
Marchant was born on 3 January 1916 in Little Stanmore, Middlesex, England. He studied at St John's College, Durham, from which he graduated with four degrees: Licentiate in Theology (LTh) in 1938; Bachelor of Arts (BA) in 1939; Master of Arts in 1942; and Bachelor of Divinity (BD) in 1964. From 1935 to 1939, he trained for ordained ministry at Tyndale Hall, Bristol.

== Ordained ministry ==
Marchant was ordained in the Church of England as a deacon in 1939 and as a priest in 1940. From 1939 to 1941, during The Blitz, he served his curacy at St Andrew's Church, Whitehall Park in the Diocese of London. From 1941 to 1944, he held a Licence to Officiate in the Diocese of London and was also the leader of the Young Churchmen's Movement, an Evangelical youth organisational. From 1944 to 1948, he served in the Diocese of Ely: he was a curate of St Andrew-the-Less, Cambridge and curate-in-charge of St Stephen's church, Cambridge (a new church that had grown out of a Sunday School).

In 1948, Marchant moved to the Diocese of Lincoln to take up his first incumbency as Vicar of Holy Trinity Church, Skirbeck, Boston. In 1954, he moved to the Diocese of Durham where he would spend the rest of his full-time ministry. From 1954 to 1974, he was Vicar of St Nicholas' Church, Durham, a large Evangelical Anglican church in the centre of the City of Durham. He also served as Rural Dean of Durham from 1964 to 1974. He was made an Honorary Canon of Durham Cathedral in 1972. From 1974 to 1983, he served as Archdeacon of Auckland and was a Canon Residentiary of Durham Cathedral.

Outside of his parish ministry, Marchant was a Member of General Synod from 1970 to 1980. He also served as Proctor in Convocation for the Diocese of Durham. He co-founded the journal The Anvil as a moderate evangelical alternative to the increasingly conservative Churchman. He served as the Chair of the Editorial Board of The Anvil from 1983 to 1991.

== Later life ==
Marchant retired from full-time ministry in 1983, and he moved to Norwich, Norfolk. From 1983 to 2001, he held Permission to Officiate in the Diocese of Norwich, which allowed him to lead services when needed.

Marchant died on 3 February 2006, aged 90.

== Personal life ==
In 1944, Marchant married Eileen Lillian Kathleen Smith. Together they had four children: one son and three daughters.
