= David V. Day =

British theologian, teacher, academic and priest (born 1936)

The Reverend David V. Day

Principal of St John's College, Durham
- In office 1992–1999
- Preceded by: Anthony Thiselton
- Succeeded by: Stephen Sykes

Personal details
- Born: David Vivian Day; 11 August 1936 (age 89)
- Spouse: Lorna Rosemary Taylor (m. 1959)
- Children: Three
- Education: Tottenham Grammar School
- Alma mater: Queen Mary College, University of London; University of Nottingham

Ecclesiastical career
- Religion: Christianity
- Church: Church of England
- Ordained: 1999 (deacon); 2000 (priest)
- Congregations served: St Nicholas' Church, Durham (1999–present)

David Vivian Day (born 11 August 1936) is a retired British theologian, school teacher, academic, and Anglican priest. From 1992 to 1999, he was Principal of St John's College, Durham.

== Early life and education ==
Day was born on 11 August 1936 to Frederick Vivian Day and Enid Blodwen (née Evans). He was educated at Tottenham Grammar School, a state grammar school in north London. He studied classics at Queen Mary College, University of London, and graduated with a Bachelor of Arts (BA) degree in 1957.

Day continued his university studies in later life. He studied education at the University of Nottingham while he was a teacher in the city, and graduated with a Master of Education (MEd) degree in 1973. He later studied theology at Nottingham, graduating with a Master of Theology (MTh) degree in 1977.

== Career ==
Day's early career was spent as a school teacher. From 1958 to 1964, he was a classics master at Southgate County School, the a state grammar school in the London Borough of Enfield. Then, from 1964 to 1966, he was Head of Religious Education at Southgate. He moved to Bilborough School, then a grammar school in Bilborough, Nottingham, and was its Head of Religious Education between 1966 and 1973.

Day then moved into academia. From 1973 to 1979, he was a senior lecturer in theology at Bishop Lonsdale College, an Anglican teacher training college in Derby. In 1979, he moved to the University of Durham. He was a senior lecturer in education between 1979 and 1997, and was Principal of St John's College, Durham between 1992 and 1999. As head of St John's College, he was also part of the leadership of Cranmer Hall, Durham, an Anglican theological college that trains people for ordained ministry.

Having retired from academia, Day felt the call to ordination. He was ordained in the Church of England as a deacon in 1999 and as a priest in 2000. From 1999 to 2007, he was a non-stipendiary minister at St Nicholas' Church, Durham. Since 2007, he has held Permission to Officiate in the Diocese of Durham, and continues to preach at St Nicholas' as of 2021.

== Personal life ==
In 1959, Day married Lorna Rosemary Taylor. Together they have three children; one daughter and two sons.

== Honours ==
On 31 March 2016, Day was awarded the Lanfranc Award for Education and Scholarship by Justin Welby, the Archbishop of Canterbury, during a ceremony at Lambeth Palace.

== Selected works ==
- Day, David (1981). This Jesus (2nd ed.). Leicester: Inter-Varsity. ISBN 978-0851104294.
- Day, David (1987). Jeremiah: speaking for God in a time of crisis. Leicester: Inter-Varsity. ISBN 978-0851104997.
- Day, David; May, Philip (1991). Teenage beliefs. Oxford: Lion. ISBN 978-0745919638.
- Astley, Jeff; Day, David, eds. (1992). The contours of Christian education. Great Wakering, Essex: McCrimmons. ISBN 978-0855974954.
- Day, David; Astley, Jeff (1996). Beyond the here and now. Oxford: Lion. ISBN 978-0745923659.
- Day, David (1998). A preaching workbook. London: Lynx. ISBN 978-1901443158.
- Day, David (2001). Pearl beyond price: the attractive Jesus. London: Fount. ISBN 978-0007115686.
- Day, David (2005). Embodying the word: a preacher's guide. London: SPCK. ISBN 978-0281056897.
- Day, David; Astley, Jeff; Francis, Leslie J., eds. (2006). A reader on preaching: making connections. Aldershot: Ashgate. ISBN 978-0754650096.
- Day, David (2013). Christ our life: Colossians. London: Church House Publishing. ISBN 978-0715143520.

Academic offices
Preceded by Anthony Thiselton	Principal of St John's College, Durham; 1992 to 1999	Succeeded by Stephen Sykes
