= Tan Hills =

Village in County Durham, England

Coordinates: 54.823°N 1.601°W

- Location within County Durham
- OS grid reference: NZ257476
- Unitary authority: County Durham
- Ceremonial county: County Durham
- Region: North East
- Country: England
- Sovereign state: United Kingdom
- Post town: DURHAM
- Postcode district: DH2
- Police: Durham
- Fire: County Durham and Darlington
- Ambulance: North East

Tan Hills is a village in County Durham, in England. It is situated close to Sacriston, Kimblesworth and Nettlesworth, between Durham and Chester-le-Street.
