= George Marchant (disambiguation) =

George Marchant (1857–1941) was an Australian businessman and philanthropist.

George Marchant may also refer to:

- George Marchant (priest) (1916–2006), British Anglican priest
- George Marchant (politician) (1849–1943), New Zealand dairy farmer and politician
