= Nick Barker (priest) =

British Anglican priest

Nicholas John Willoughby Barker (born 12 December 1949) is a British Anglican priest. He was the Archdeacon of Auckland in the Diocese of Durham from 2007 until his retirement on 31 July 2017.

Barker was educated at Sedbergh School and Oriel College, Oxford. After studying for ordination at Trinity College, Bristol he was a curate at St Mary, Watford from 1977 to 1980. After that he was Team Vicar of St James & Emmanuel, Didsbury from 1980 to 1986 then Team Rector, St George, Kidderminster from 1986 to 2007. He is also Priest in charge of Holy Trinity Church, Darlington.
