= St Nicholas Church, Durham =

- St Nics
- The church viewed from the marketplace

- Location within Durham, England
- 54°46′39″N 1°34′31″W
- OS grid reference: NZ 27418 42587
- Location: Durham, County Durham
- Country: England
- Denomination: Church of England
- Previous denomination: Roman Catholic
- Churchmanship: Open Evangelical
- Website: www.stnics.org.uk

History
- Status: Civic church
- Dedication: Saint Nicholas

Architecture
- Functional status: Active
- Heritage designation: Grade II
- Architect: James Pigott Pritchett junior
- Completed: 1858

Administration
- Province: Province of York
- Diocese: Diocese of Durham
- Archdeaconry: Archdeaconry of Durham
- Deanery: Deanery of Durham
- Parish: St Nicholas Durham

Clergy
- Vicar: Will Foulger
- Priest: Maeve Sherlock

St Nicholas Church, commonly known as St Nics, is a Church of England parish church located in Durham in County Durham, England. The church is part of the open evangelical tradition of the Church of England.

== History ==
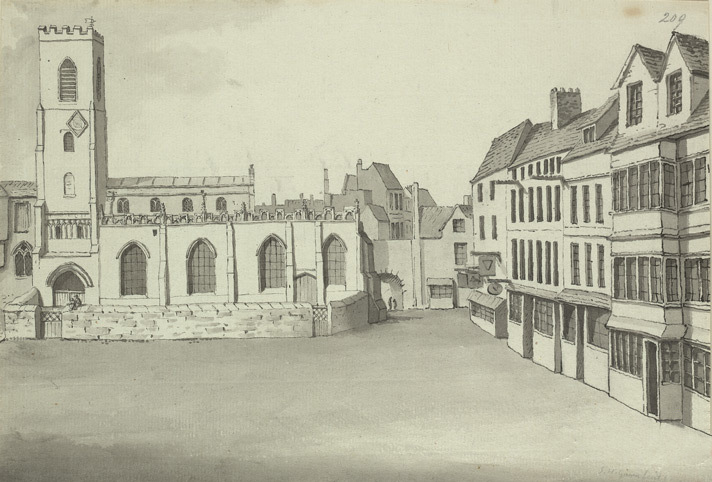
The church in the 18th century, before shortening of the east end

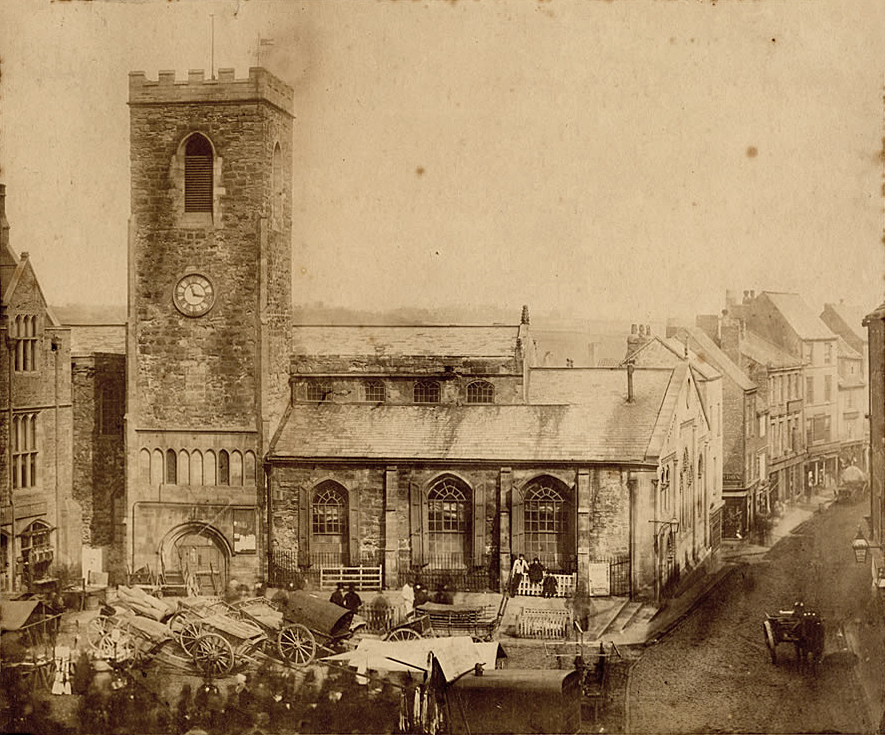
Old church before its 1857 demolition

=== Old St Nicholas' Church ===
The original St Nicholas' Church is thought to have been founded in the early 12th century by Ranulf Flambard, Prince Bishop of Durham. He cleared Palace Green, between the cathedral and his castle, and established the current marketplace below the castle, with the church of St Nicholas, patron saint of merchants, beside it. The first recorded vicar was Galfrid de Elemer, in 1133.

This church had a buttressed nave and chancel, and a square tower with battlements. Its north wall formed part of the city walls, and abutted the ancient Clayport Gate on one side until the gate's demolition in 1791. A graveyard lay between the church and the marketplace, and another behind the church.

The building was extensively modified over the centuries, including shortening of the east end to allow widening of the road, and in the 19th century a market piazza was built against its south wall. It was described in 1803 as "very ruinous", while Sir Stephen Glynne, who visited in 1825, said it was "a large structure, & displays some marks of antiquity, although the barbarous hand of innovation has swept nearly all before it", and that its windows "alas! are of too sad a description to be mentioned". He did, however, note that it was "neatly pewed" and that the South porch was "good Perpendicular".

=== 1858 rebuilding ===
The main portal

In 1854, a competition was held to secure an architect to renovate the church, which was won by 24-year-old Darlington-based architect James Pigott Pritchett junior. However, when the market piazza was demolished, it was found that the church was beyond repair, and Pritchett was engaged instead to design and build a new church. The incumbent, George Townshend Fox, gave an initial donation of £1000 (equivalent to £96,000 in 2025) towards the cost of rebuilding.

The old church was demolished in June 1857. Almost all that remains from it is its font, dating from 1700, and its five bells, dating from 1687 and therefore the oldest ring of bells in the diocese. Though the bells were not rung from the 1970s onwards due to fears for the safety of the tower, ringing resumed in 2000 and the 17th-century bells, along with a sixth added in 1889, are now rung frequently.

Fundator dei gloriae regno augustissimi Iacobi secundi Nathaniele : : Epise Robert Delaval Arm: Praetore Ralph Trotter Rob: Robson Ch Wardens 1687
Founded to the glory of God in the reign of the most august James II, Nathaniel bishop, Robert Delaval mayor, Ralph Trotter and Robert Robson Church Wardens, 1687

— Inscription on the five original bells

Pritchett's new church, in the decorated gothic style, was estimated to cost £3,600 (equivalent to £387,000 in 2025) and was opened with great ceremony in December 1858. The building was described by the Illustrated London News at the time as "the most beautiful specimen of church architecture in the north of England", and was considered by Nikolaus Pevsner to be one of Pritchett's best. It was the first church in Durham to have a spire; which had not been part of Pritchett's original plan, but was added at the behest of Fox, who paid the £400 cost himself. It is a Grade II listed building.

=== Reordering and later ===
George Carey, later Archbishop of Canterbury, was vicar of St Nicholas from 1975 to 1982. During that time he led a project, supervised by ecclesiastical architect Ronald Sims, in which the pews and the majority of the Victorian interior features of the church were removed to allow the church to be used more flexibly for worship and community activities. Carey's book The Church in the Marketplace describes the process and its impact on the life of the parish.

During the 2020 COVID-19 pandemic, the church moved many of its activities online, producing morning and evening services each Sunday as well as daily prayer. Vicar Arun Arora reported that the church had seen increased attendance at some online services compared to previous in-person events, and intended to continue livestreaming its services once in-person gatherings resumed.

== Parish and population ==
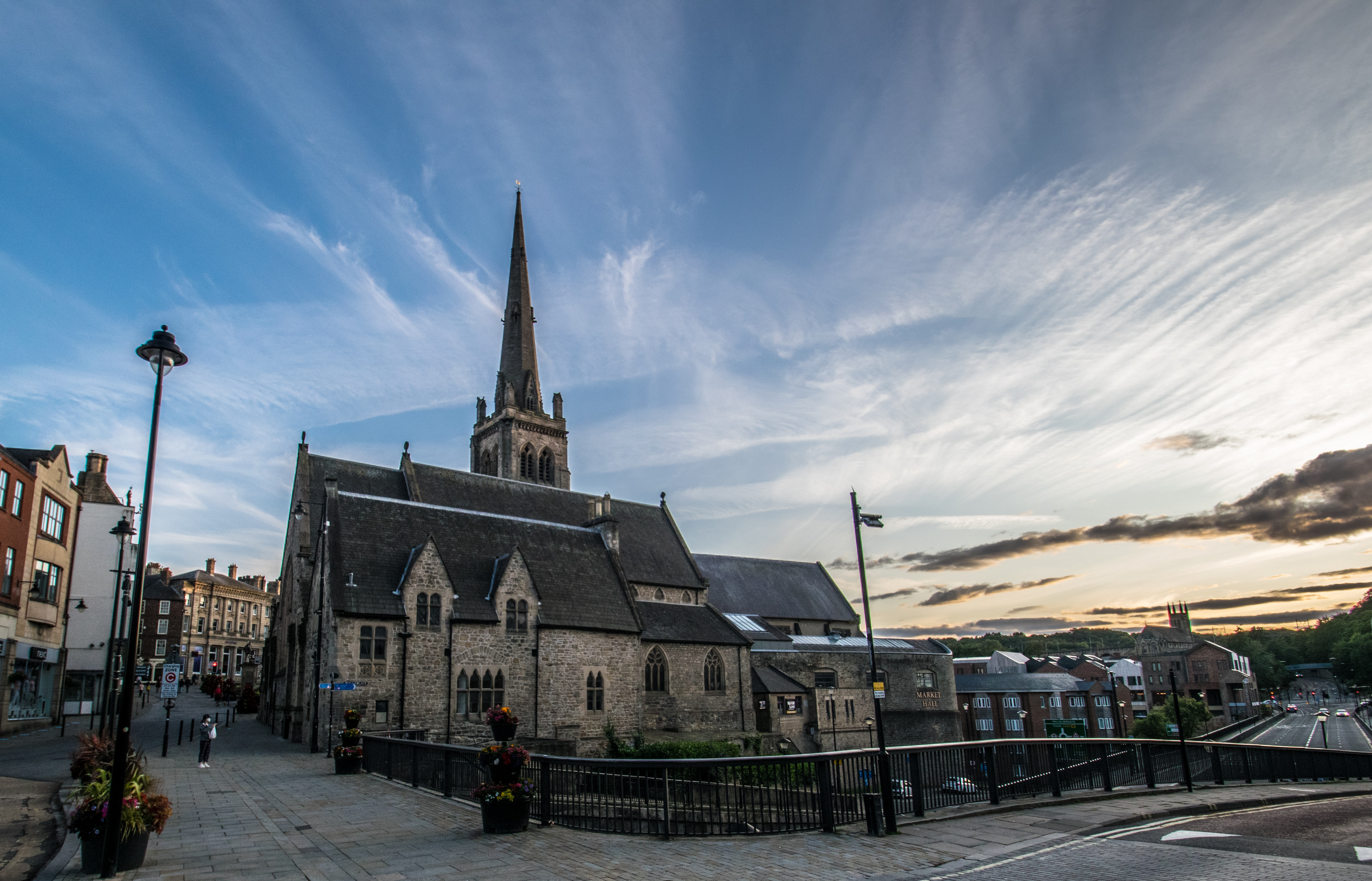
St Nicholas Church from the back, showing the compact design with the church hall at left as part of the same structure. The lighter-grey roof at centre right belongs to the Market Hall.

The parish is small (covering only the area around the Market Place, Claypath and The Sands) and is bounded by the parishes of Durham's three other ancient city churches – St Giles', St Oswald's and St Margaret's. Historically the parish was densely populated; however, slum clearance in the 1920s (as well as commercial development of previously residential areas) greatly reduced the population of the parish, and though more recent building has increased this a little, the church draws the majority of its congregation from outside its own parish. It has a large student population, and is classified by the Diocese of Durham as its own locality, meaning that its mission is recognised as distinctly different from those of other city centre churches. The church has a long tradition of evangelicalism, and its patronage has been held by the Church Pastoral Aid Society since the mid-19th century.

== Outreach ==
One notable feature of the reordered church was the Gateway World Shop, which occupied the south-east corner of the church, having its own outside entrance, and sold Fair trade goods. The shop reflected the church's long involvement with the fair trade movement; Richard Adams, founder of Traidcraft, was a member of the church. The shop closed in February 2023 (shortly after Traidcraft went into administration), citing increasing costs and falling profits linked to the COVID-19 pandemic, and the increased availability of fair-trade goods through mainstream supermarkets.

St Nics has a long history of supporting overseas mission. The first bishop of Uganda, Alfred Tucker, left his curacy at St Nics to bring Christianity to Uganda. This support is currently expressed by the church's financial support of the Church Mission Society, South American Missionary Society, the Bible Society, Spanish Outreach Ministries and the Diocese of Lesotho.

== Notable clergy ==
- Arun Arora, previously Director of Communications for the Church of England and subsequently Bishop of Kirkstall, was vicar 2017-2022
- Pete Broadbent, later Bishop of Willesden, served his curacy here in the late 1970s.
- George Carey, later Archbishop of Canterbury, was vicar of St Nicholas from 1975 to 1982.
- David V. Day, former Principal of St John's College, Durham, was a non-stipendiary minister from 1999 to 2007, and remains part of the ministry team as of 2021.
- Alistair Magowan, later Bishop of Ludlow, was curate here 1984–9.
- George Marchant, later Archdeacon of Auckland, was vicar of St Nicholas from 1954 to 1974.
- Maeve Sherlock, Baroness Sherlock, became curate here in 2018, and Associate Minister in 2022.
- Alfred Tucker, later Bishop of Eastern Equatorial Africa, served his curacy here in the 1880s.
- John Wenham, Biblical scholar, was vicar 1948–1953.
- Frank White, later Bishop of Brixworth, served his curacy here in the 1980s.
