= Woodhouse Colliery =

Proposed coal mine in Cumbria, England

- Location in Copeland Borough Location in Cumbria
- Location: Whitehaven, Cumbria, England; 54°31′31.8″N 3°35′49.7″W
- Products: Coal
- Production: 3,000,000 tonnes (3,300,000 tons) projected per annum
- Opened: (cancelled)
- Company: West Cumbria Mining (WCM)
- Website: Official website

Woodhouse Colliery, also known as Whitehaven coal mine, was a proposed coal mine near to Whitehaven in Cumbria, England. The coal mine had been advertised as bringing jobs to a deprived area, but had also come in for criticism by green campaigners. The mine was proposed by West Cumbria Mining and planned to extract coking coal from beneath the Irish Sea for 25 years. The plan was criticised by some MPs, scientists and environmentalists due to the coal mine's environmental impact and the British government's legal commitments to reduce carbon emissions.

The planning application had been under consideration since 2019, when Cumbria County Council granted planning permission for the venture. The colliery would have been the first new deep coal mine in the United Kingdom in 30 years (the last such development was the Asfordby pit in 1986). It is not to be confused with the former Woodhouse Close Colliery in Woodhouse Close, Bishop Auckland (County Durham) which operated between 1835 and 1934.

The government initially took the view that the decision should be a local one, but became involved in March 2021, putting the project on hold. There was speculation that Robert Jenrick, the Secretary of State involved, was influenced by the forthcoming United Nations Climate Change Conference, held that year in Glasgow, but he did not give a reason. Michael Gove, Jenrick's successor as Secretary of State, gave planning consent in December 2022, but faced legal challenges which had not been resolved by the time of the 2024 United Kingdom general election. After the election, as well as uncertainty about the outcome of the court case, there was some uncertainty about whether the incoming Labour government would oppose the project. However, shortly before the court hearing, the new Secretary of State expressed the view that the previous government's decision to approve Woodhouse Colliery was unlawful because emissions had not been taken into consideration.

On 31 March 2025, West Cumbria Mining withdrew its planning application for Woodhouse Colliery at Whitehaven after the High Court had quashed the mine’s 2022 approval in September 2024 for failing to consider downstream greenhouse‑gas emissions, effectively cancelling what would have been the United Kingdom’s first deep coal mine in more than three decades. Environmental organisations, including Friends of the Earth and South Lakes Action on Climate Change, welcomed the decision and called for investment in well‑paid, low‑carbon jobs for the region, ensuring West Cumbria benefits from the transition away from coal.

== History ==
In June 2014, West Cumbria Mining announced its intention to invest £14.7 million in a venture to explore for premium quality coking coal underneath the sea off Whitehaven. The project had started before as a plan to find and gasify the coal for energy use, but when the quality of the coal was discovered, it precipitated a shift into mining the coal for steelmaking. It was intended to use the coal only for coking rather than for the electricity supply industry (ESI). The fall in the price of ESI coal in the world markets also precipitated the closure of mines taking coal only for ESI. (Note: Such as Kellingley in West Yorkshire, the last deep coal mine in operation in Britain which closed after a drop in the world coal price.) If approved, the mine would have been England's first deep coal mine since the Asfordby pit was sunk in 1987.

The inferred resources suggest that the mine could produce over 3,000,000 tonnes (3,300,000 tons) of coking coal per year from across a 77-square-mile (200 km^{2}) section underneath the Irish Sea. Backers of the scheme pointed out that Britain imports 6,000,000 tonnes (6,600,000 tons) of coal per year (from which coke is synthesised at large steel plants), of which none is sourced in Europe, with most being from Australia and the USA. (Note: This was before the SSI UK steelworks at Redcar closed in 2015, and imports of coal have dropped in line with demand with supply from Canada stopping completely in 2015.)

The Cumberland Coalfield was previously mined. Haig Colliery, the last deep coal mine in Cumbria, closed in 1986. The new mine would have used former but extant tunnels from previous mining ventures for coal and anhydrite. The mine head would have been located on the former Marchon chemical works site close to Haig Colliery and the suburb of Woodhouse just south of Whitehaven town centre in Cumbria. (Note: The Guardian article stated that the proposed mine site was south of Kendal, but this is incorrect. A letter the following week by Marianne Kirkby amended this error.) The proposal was to mine the carboniferous coal seam up to a maximum depth of 1,804 feet (550 m).

In 2017, a geological team were working offshore from St Bees Head drilling into the rock 82 feet (25 m) below the sea bed to a depth of 2,000 feet (600 m). This was to determine the quality of the coal and check for any geological conditions that could affect the planning of the mine. On 8 September 2017 West Cumbria Mining's drilling contractors accidentally caused a methane leak in the Irish Sea. HM Coastguard said they were notified that drilling operations from a jack-up barge had struck a gas pocket approximately one nautical mile from St Bees Head.

The mine was expected to have a life of 50 years and employ 500 workers with the possibility the area contains over 750,000,000 tonnes (830,000,000 tons) of coal in its reserves. 80% of the output from the mine was promised to be railed out of the area to Redcar Bulk Terminal on Teesside for export. A conveyor was to move the coal from the site to a loader 2 miles (2.5 km) away. Trains were to number up to six per day including Saturdays, though the company acknowledged that the increase in traffic on the railway would require signalling improvements on the Cumbrian Coast Line. Additionally, West Cumbria Mining applied to install a solar farm on the estate that would cover 600 acres (240 ha) and provide 40% of the electricity needs of the mining operation.

West Cumbria Mining is owned by EMR Capital, a company based in Australia that has injected over £20 million into the venture by June 2017. A further £200 million was projected to be spent in final testing, acquisition of rights and the implementation of the mine. The facility itself was expected to cost in the region of £165 million.

The prospect of England's first new coal mine in over 30 years was first opposed by nuclear safety campaigners Radiation Free Lakeland with their slogan: 'Keep Cumbrian coal in the hole.

The project was officially cancelled in 2025.

== Approvals and appeals ==
In March 2019, a meeting of Cumbria County Council's planning committee voted unanimously in favour of the project citing "the desperate need for jobs, particularly in deprived wards close to the proposed new mine". Green campaigners announced that they would launch a legal challenge. A spokesperson for South Lakes Action on Climate Change, said that the mine would "totally undermine Cumbria's chances of hitting emission targets".

In November 2019, the government decided not to intervene in the appeals process and stated the "...[Cumbria County] Council should take the decision". Work on the site was expected to start in 2020, with coaling operations starting in 2022.

In exercise of his powers under Article 31 of the Town and Country Planning (Development Management Procedure) (England) Order 2015, Robert Jenrick, the Secretary of State for Housing, Communities and Local Government, directed the Council, in a letter dated 28 September 2020, not to grant permission to the West Cumbria Mining (WCM) application without specific authorisation. The Council's Development Control and Regulation Committee were nevertheless reported to have approved West Cumbria Mining plans for the mine in October 2020 for a third time.

In January 2021 Robert Jenrick refused the request of Cumbrian MP Tim Farron to "call in" the plans for review at national level. In January 2021 the chair of the Committee on Climate Change (CCC), Lord Deben, sent a letter to Jenrick rebuking him for allowing the planning permission to stand. The government responded that the decision not to call in the coal mine would not be reversed.

On 28 January 2021 the Coal Authority announced that on 18 January 2020 West Cumbria Mining had applied for, and been granted, an indefinite extension to the duration of two of their three Coal Authority licences, as both licences were due to run out on 24 January 2021.

On 9 February 2021 Cumbria County Council officers told West Cumbria Mining it had decided to return the planning application for Woodhouse Colliery back to their Development Control and Regulation Committee for re-determination.

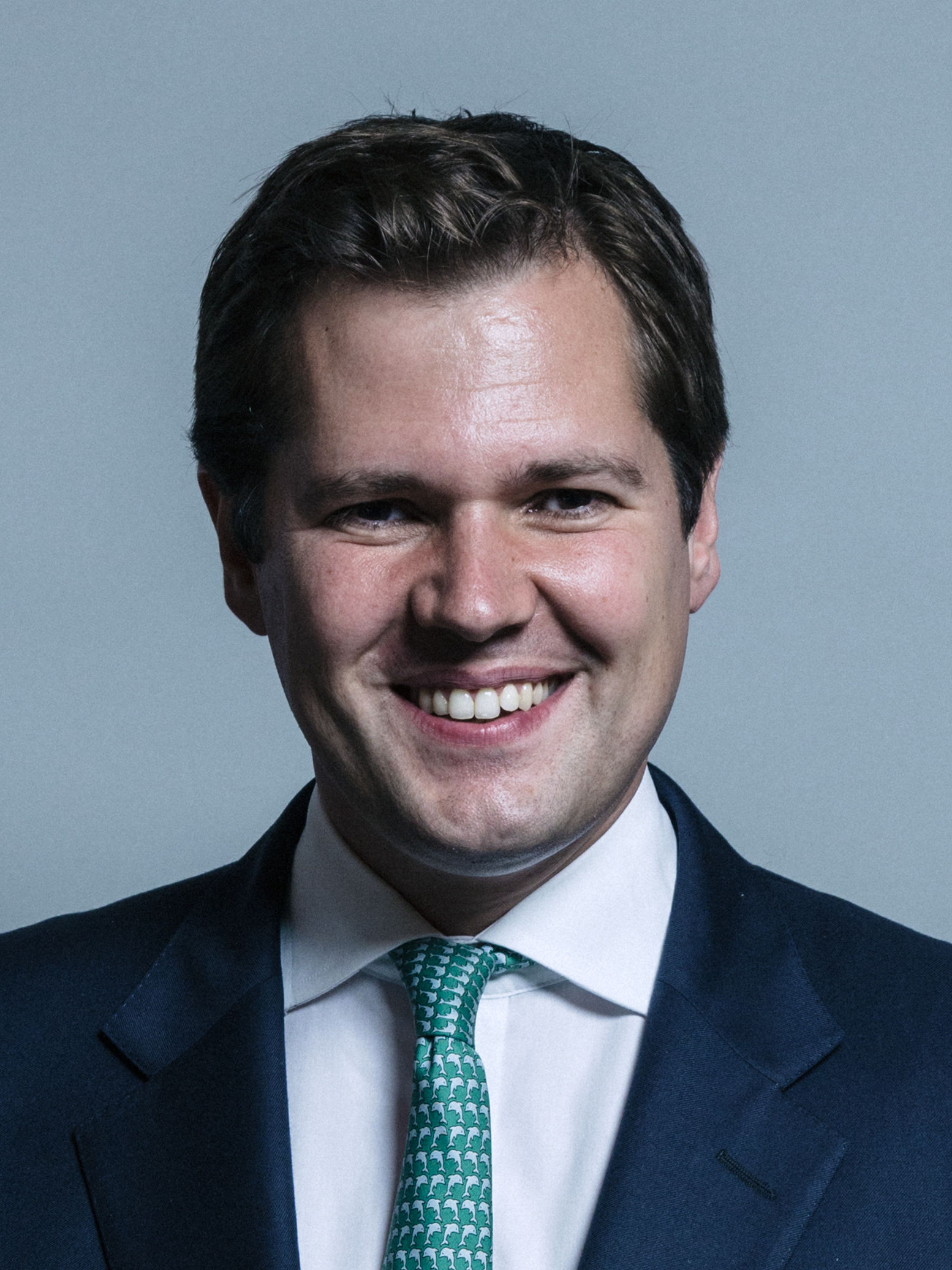
Secretary of State Robert Jenrick who initially refused requests to call in the plans for review.

In March 2021 Jenrick announced he was 'calling in' the planning application. Jenrick's successor Michael Gove, as Secretary of State for Levelling Up, Housing and Communities, approved the application in December 2022, although the decision was subject to legal challenges.

== Extraction and environmental impact ==
The mine planned to extract 2.7m tonnes of coking coal per year, to be used in steel-making. Around 85% of the coal was planned to be exported.

It was estimated that the coal extracted from the mine would emit 8.4 million tonnes of carbon dioxide per year. In 2019 the UK's total carbon emissions were 354 million tonnes. Climate Change Committee chair Lord Deben stated that "this is greater than the level of annual emissions we have projected from all open UK coalmines to 2050".

== Economic impact ==
Supporters of the mine claimed that supplying coking coal for steel manufacture in the UK would reduce coal imports. West Cumbria Mining projected the mine would create 500 jobs and said they would pay into a community fund for 10 years. A report by Cumbria Action For Sustainability 2021 however proposed the potential for green jobs for Cumbria as an alternative to the proposed mine. A Facebook page "We Support West Cumbria Mining" rallied local support to counter the protests from environmental groups.

== Reactions ==
Some MPs, developing country experts, scientists, green campaigners and government advisers criticised the mine.

Climate change campaigner Greta Thunberg criticised the approval of the mine stating: "The UK government has decided not to intervene with the plans of opening a brand new English coal mine. This really shows the true meaning of so called 'net zero 2050'. These vague, insufficient targets long into the future basically mean nothing today."

James Hansen, adjunct professor directing the Program on Climate Science, Awareness and Solutions of the Earth Institute at Columbia University and former director of the NASA Goddard Institute for Space Studies stated approving the mine showed a "contemptuous disregard for the future of young people" and that "It shows they (the government) are really not serious," about climate change.

Prof Sir Robert Watson who has worked on atmospheric science issues including ozone depletion, global warming and paleoclimatology since the 1980s called the coal mine 'absolutely ridiculous'.

MP Tim Farron described the coal mine as a "complete disaster for our children's future". Greenpeace UK stated "claims that it will be carbon neutral are like claiming an oil rig is a wind turbine."

A climate change campaigner went on a 10 day hunger strike in protest in February 2020.

Mohamed Adow, winner of the Climate Breakthrough Award and director of the Power Shift Africa thinktank stated: "It's a bizarre and shocking decision. People in the developing world who are suffering from the effects of the climate crisis will be horrified. They are relying on the UK to be their champion on climate change and be an example, not returning to the dirty days of coal."

In February 2021, 40 Conservative Party MPs signed a letter to the local council's Labour leader urging them to approve the project.

In August 2023, environmental direct action group Earth First! squatted the site for a week for their 2023 summer gathering, and called for the proposed mine to not go ahead.

== Notes ==
=== Sources ===
- Woodhouse Colliery Planning Application Environmental Statement Non-Technical Summary (PDF) (Report). Whitehaven: West Cumbria Mining. 2017.
