= Tan Hill =

Tan Hill may refer to:

- Tan Hill, North Yorkshire, England
- Tan Hill, Wiltshire, England

== See also ==
Tan Hills
