= Stranks =

Stranks is a British surname.

Notable people with this surname include:

- Charles Stranks (1901–1981), British author
- Donald Richard "Don" Stranks (1929–1986), 14th vice-chancellor of the University of Adelaide
- Jonathan Stranks (born 1994), British gymnast
- Sidney Stranks (c. 1868–1953), British trade unionist
- Susan Stranks (born 1938), British actress

== See also ==
- Strank
