= Paul Butler (bishop) =

Bishop of Durham from 2014 to 2024

The Right Reverend Paul Butler
- Bishop of Durham
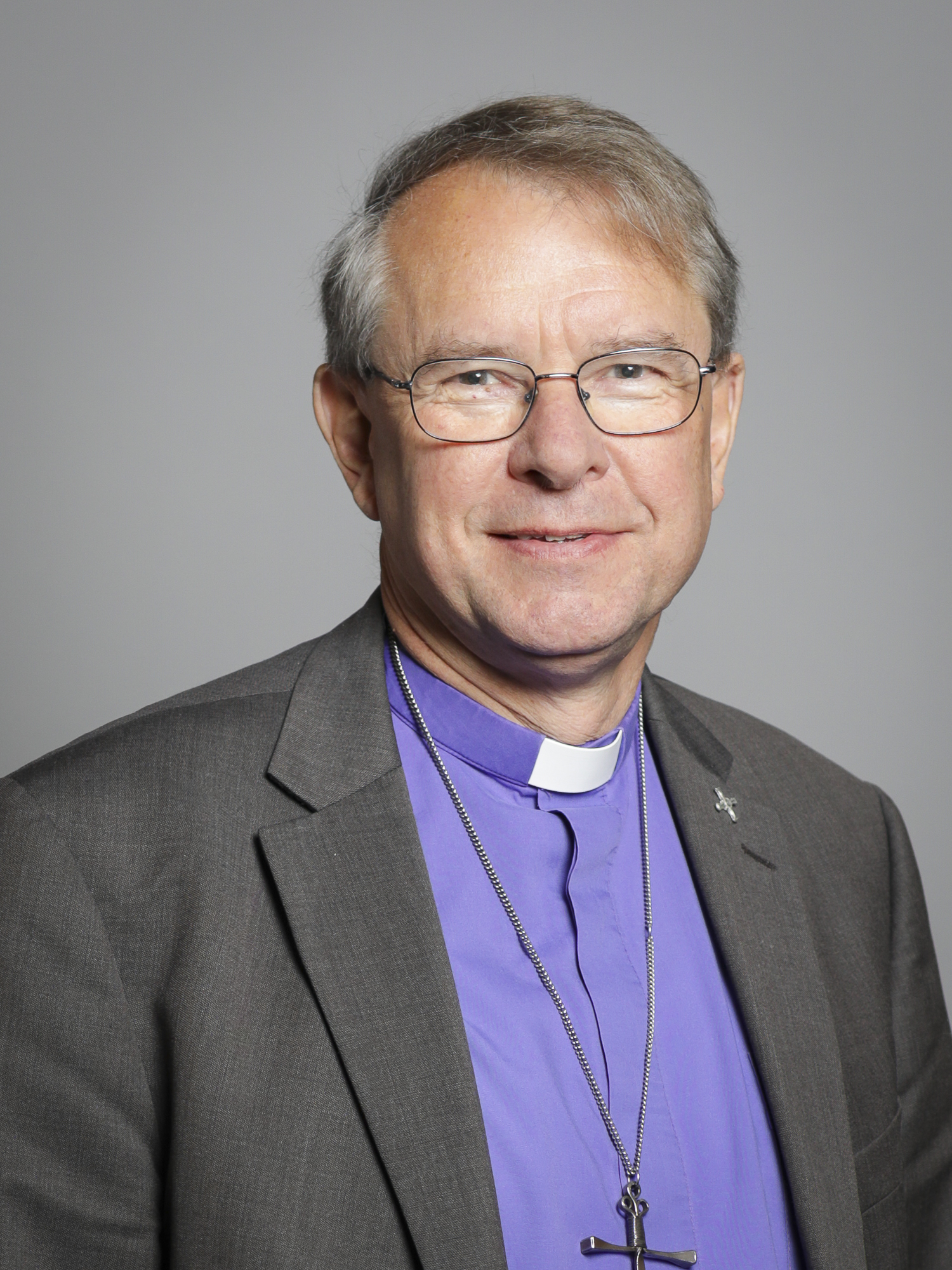
- Official portrait, 2019
- Church: Church of England
- Diocese: Durham
- Installed: 22 February 2014
- Retired: 29 February 2024
- Predecessor: Justin Welby
- Successor: Rick Simpson
- Previous posts: Bishop of Southwell and Nottingham (2010–2014); Bishop of Southampton (2004–2009)

Orders
- Ordination: 1983 (deacon); 1984 (priest) by Ronald Bowlby
- Consecration: 24 June 2004 by Rowan Williams

Personal details
- Born: 18 September 1955 (age 71)
- Denomination: Anglican
- Spouse: Rosemary
- Children: Four
- Education: University of Nottingham; Wycliffe Hall, Oxford

Member of the House of Lords
- Lord Spiritual
- Ex officio as Bishop of Durham; 11 February 2014 – 29 February 2024

Member of the House of Lords
- Lord Spiritual
- as Bishop of Southwell and Nottingham; 18 December 2013 – 20 January 2014

Paul Roger Butler (born 18 September 1955) is a retired British Anglican bishop and a former Lord Spiritual of the House of Lords. He was the Bishop of Durham, the diocesan bishop of the Diocese of Durham, from January 2014 to February 2024. He had previously been Bishop of Southampton from 2004 to 2009, and then Bishop of Southwell and Nottingham from 2010 to 2014.

== Early life ==
Butler was educated at Kingston Grammar School and received a BA in English and history with honours from the University of Nottingham in 1977. He worked for the Universities and Colleges Christian Fellowship (UCCF) in their Bookstall Service (1978–1980) before training for Ordained ministry at Wycliffe Hall, Oxford from 1980 to 1983.

== Ordained ministry ==
He was ordained a deacon at Petertide (on 3 July) 1983 and a priest the following Petertide (1 July 1984), both times by Bishop Ronald Bowlby in Southwark Cathedral. He served his curacy between 1983 and 1987 at All Saints with Holy Trinity in Wandsworth in the Diocese of Southwark. He then moved to Scripture Union to become Inner London Evangelist, holding this post until 1992. Between 1992 and 1994 he was Deputy Head of Mission at Scripture Union. Between 1987 and 1994, he was also a non-stipendiary minister at St Paul's East Ham in the Diocese of Chelmsford.

Butler then moved to the Diocese of Chelmsford. Between 1994 and 1997 he was priest-in-charge of St. Mary's Church, Walthamstow with St Stephen's and St Luke's, becoming team rector of Walthamstow in 1997 until 2004. He was also area dean of Waltham Forest from 2000 to 2004 and was appointed an honorary canon of Byumba in Rwanda in 2001.

=== Episcopal ministry ===
Butler was consecrated by the archbishop of Canterbury, Rowan Williams, at St Paul's Cathedral on 24 June 2004 and then installed at Winchester Cathedral on 4 July 2004. He served as the suffragan Bishop of Southampton in the Diocese of Winchester from 2004 until 2010. He was then Bishop of Southwell and Nottingham. He was installed at Southwell Minster on 27 February 2010.

Butler also acted as an "Advocate for Children" amongst the bishops of the Church of England and as chairman of the Churches National Safeguarding Committee.

On 12 September 2013, it was announced that he had been appointed as the next Bishop of Durham, the diocesan bishop of the Diocese of Durham, succeeding Justin Welby. He was elected as Bishop of Durham on 20 January 2014. He was installed and enthroned as the 79th Bishop of Durham during a service in Durham Cathedral on 22 February 2014. On 14 July 2023, he announced his retirement, effective 29 February 2024.

On 18 December 2013, Butler gained a seat in the House of Lords when he became the next most senior diocesan bishop through length of service while Bishop of Southwell and Nottingham. However, he did not take up his seat as he had "stopped actively working" while waiting to transfer episcopal see from Southwell and Nottingham to Durham. As Bishop of Durham, he held an ex-officio seat in the House of Lords by virtue of his ecclesiastical office being one of five most senior bishoprics of the Church of England. He made his maiden speech in the Lords on 10 June 2014 during the debate following that year's Queen's Speech.

Butler is known for his annual "prayer-walks" in which he spends a week each year walking round a part of his diocese praying with local people.

In the 2018 Lambeth Awards given by the archbishop of Canterbury, Paul Butler received the Hubert Walter Award for Reconciliation and Interfaith Cooperation for service to the church in his role as lead bishop on safeguarding.

He took part in the 2023 Coronation as one of the two Bishops Assistant to Charles III, alongside Michael Beasley, Bishop of Bath and Wells.

== Views ==
Butler is concerned about Universal Credit and fears the two child limit will force children in families with more than two children into relative poverty. In 2018 Butler said, "If people fall out of work for whatever reason they will not get the protection if they've got three children now. The predictions from people like the independent financial services are that the child limit is actually going to have the biggest impact on increasing the number of children living in relative poverty. I would love the government to have the willingness to revisit that whole policy."

Butler is also concerned about monthly payments and about delays in paying benefit, he feels moving people from weekly payments to monthly payments is unrealistic.

Butler has stated that he would not conduct same-sex marriages as he continues to view marriage as a union between a man and a woman. He voted against introducing "standalone services for same-sex couples" on a trial basis during a meeting of the General Synod in November 2023; the motion passed. Nevertheless, in February 2023 he voted in favour of blessings for same-sex couples in the Church of England.

== Personal life and other work ==
He was a trustee of the Church Mission Society from 2000 to 2010 and its chairman from 2008 to 2010. He regularly visits Rwanda, Burundi and Uganda, and visited Natal, South Africa in January 2011 as part of a diocesan visit.

He has also served the YMCA at Forest (1995–2004), Southampton (2004–09), Nottingham (2010–13), Teesdale (2014-present).

In 2012 he was appointed president of Scripture Union, the charity he had worked for from 1987 to 1994.

He is a patron of the Scargill Movement (which operates Scargill House) as well as the Nottingham-based charity the Ear Foundation.

In March 2015, it was revealed that Butler had, a year previously, reported former Conservative MP Enoch Powell as being involved with a Westminster paedophile ring in the 1980s, after the allegations were passed to him by Dominic Walker, the former bishop of Monmouth.

== Safeguarding controversy and the Elliott Review ==
Butler was the bishop at the centre of the Elliott Review which led to damning headlines across UK media in March 2016. The review ushered in major change to the church's response to survivors of church sex abuse, and condemned as "reckless" the way in which Butler cut contact with a survivor following advice from insurers to limit liability. The highly critical report concluded there had been a string of "deeply disturbing" failures by senior Church of England figures, including the office of the archbishop of Canterbury, Justin Welby. It highlighted the need for all bishops to be urgently retrained. The church described the review "embarrassing and uncomfortable". The survivor called Butler's response "inadequate" and in a public letter urged him to lead a call for repentance across the House of Bishops.

== Publications ==
He has a number of publications, including Reaching Children (1992), Reaching Families (1995) (both Scripture Union); Temptation & Testing (SPCK, 2007) and is a contributor to Through the Eyes of a Child (Church House 2009). His most recent publication is Living Your Confirmation (SPCK, 2012).

Church of England titles
Preceded by Jonathan Gledhill	Bishop of Southampton; 2004–2009	Succeeded by Jonathan Frost
Preceded by George Cassidy	Bishop of Southwell and Nottingham; 2010–2014	Succeeded by Paul Williams
Preceded by Justin Welby	Bishop of Durham; 2014–2024	Succeeded by Rick Simpson
