= Rick Simpson (bishop) =

British Anglican priest (born 1966)

The Right Reverend Rick Simpson
- Bishop of Durham
- Church: Church of England
- Diocese: Diocese of Durham
- Predecessor: Paul Butler
- Previous post: Archdeacon of Auckland (2018–2026)

Orders
- Consecration: 30 April 2026 by Stephen Cottrell

Personal details
- Born: 5 July 1966 (age 60)
- Denomination: Anglican
- Education: Keble College, Oxford; Westminster College, Oxford; Wycliffe Hall, Oxford

Richard Lee "Rick" Simpson (born 5 July 1966) is a British Anglican bishop. Since 2026, he has been Bishop of Durham. He was the Archdeacon of Auckland in the Diocese of Durham from 2018 to 2026.

== Early life and education ==
Simpson was born on 5 July 1966. He studied theology at Keble College, Oxford, graduating with a Bachelor of Arts (BA) degree in 1988. He was president of the Oxford Inter-Collegiate Christian Union in 1986. He then undertook teacher training at Westminster College, Oxford, and completed his Postgraduate Certificate in Education (PGCE) in 1989. He returned to Keble for postgraduate study and graduated with a Master of Philosophy (MPhil) degree in 1991. From 1991 to 1993, he trained for ordained ministry at Wycliffe Hall, Oxford, an evangelical Anglican theological college.

== Ordained ministry ==
Simpson was ordained in the Church of England as a deacon in 1993 and as a priest in 1994. He was a curate in Heaton, Newcastle until 1997. He was Priest in charge of Holy Trinity, Jesmond from 1997 to 2006; and then of St Brandon, Brancepeth from 2006. In addition to his parish ministry, he was involved in the training of the next generation of Anglican clergy: first as director of initial ministerial education for the Dioceses of Durham and Newcastle from 2006 to 2009; and then as a formational tutor with the Lindisfarne Regional Training Partnership from 2009 to 2018.

He was announced as the next Archdeacon of Auckland in October 2017. He was installed as archdeacon during a service at Durham Cathedral on 11 February 2018.

=== Episcopal ministry ===
On 19 February 2026, Simpson was announced as the next Bishop of Durham, vacant following the retirement of Paul Butler. He was elected by the College of Canons during a ceremony at Durham Cathedral on 11 March 2026, and the confirmation of election took place at York Minster on 29 April. He was consecrated as a bishop by Stephen Cottrell, Archbishop of York, during a service on 30 April 2026 at York Minster. He was installed as the 80th Bishop of Durham during a service at Durham Cathedral on Sunday 7 June.

As the fourth most senior bishop in the Church of England, he is one of five bishops who have ex-officio seats as Lords Spiritual in the House of Lords.
