= Percy Derry =

British Anglican priest

Percy Augustus Derry (5 October 1859 – 13 October 1928) was a British Anglican priest, most notably the Archdeacon of Auckland from 1914 until his death.

Price was born in Plymouth, educated at Harrow and Trinity College, Oxford; and ordained in 1882. His first curacy was at Holy Trinity, Stockton-On-Tees and his second in Sunderland. He held incumbencies in Rawtenstall, Norbiton, Gateshead and Sedgefield.
