= Edwin Price (priest) =

British Anglican priest (1846–1914)

Edwin Price (1846–1914) was a British Anglican priest, most notably the Archdeacon of Auckland from 1908 until his death.

Price was born in Warborough, educated at Clare College, Cambridge and ordained in 1871. After a curacy at St George the Martyr, Holborn he was a Minor Canon at Westminster Abbey from 1877 to 1890. He was Vicar of St Andrew with St Anne, Bishop Auckland from 1890 to 1903; and an Honorary Chaplain to the Queen from 1895 to 1901.

He died on 16 March 1914.
