= Diocese of Durham =

Diocese of the Church of England

Coordinates: 54.717°N 1.594°W

Diocese of Durham Dioecesis Dunelmensis
- Coat of arms

Location
- Country: United Kingdom
- Ecclesiastical province: York
- Archdeaconries: Auckland, Durham, Sunderland

Statistics
- Parishes: 249
- Churches: 292

Information
- Denomination: Church of England
- Cathedral: Durham Cathedral
- Language: English

Current leadership
- Bishop: Rick Simpson, Bishop of Durham
- Suffragan: Bishop of Jarrow (vacant; Jitesh Patel, announced)
- Archdeacons: Rick Simpson, Archdeacon of Auckland; Libby Wilkinson, Archdeacon of Durham; Katherine Bagnall, Archdeacon of Sunderland

Website
- durham.anglican.org

The diocese of Durham is a diocese of the Church of England in North East England. The boundaries of the diocese are the historic boundaries of County Durham, meaning it includes the part of Tyne and Wear south of the River Tyne and contemporary County Durham north of the River Tees. It contains 249 parishes and 292 churches. Durham Cathedral is the seat of the bishop of Durham, and the diocesan offices are located just outside the city at Stonebridge. The bishop lives in Bishop Auckland and has offices in Auckland Castle.

The diocese is the successor to the diocese of Lindisfarne, founded in 635, which moved its seat to Chester-le-Street in 882 and subsequently moved again to Durham in 995. Most of Northumberland and the part of Tyne and Wear north of the Tyne were part of the diocese until 1882, when the diocese of Newcastle was created.

== History ==
=== Origins ===
The line of bishops of Durham stretches back to the 10th century, when Aldhun, Bishop of Lindisfarne (995–1018), transferred his see to Durham around 995. The diocese was founded, with its See at Lindisfarne, in 635; until the See was removed from there around 875 and translated to Chester-le-Street (Cuncacestre) in around 882.

The Bishop owes his unique position to the 7th and 8th century Kingdom of Northumbria, which stretched from the Humber estuary to the Firth of Forth. Subsequently, the Kingdom came under Danish and English sovereignty and was transformed into an Earldom.

When William the Conqueror became king of England in 1066, he soon realised the need to control Northumbria to protect his kingdom from Scottish incursions. He gained the allegiance of both the Bishop of Durham and the Earl of Northumbria by confirming their privileges and acknowledging the remote independence of Northumbria.

To quell rebellions, William installed Robert Comine, a Norman noble, as the Earl of Northumbria, but Comine and his 700 men were massacred in Durham. In revenge, the King raided Northumbria in the Harrying of the North. Aethelwine, the Anglo-Saxon Bishop of Durham, tried to flee with Northumbrian treasures, but was caught and imprisoned. He later died in confinement, leaving his see vacant for William the King to appoint Walcher as bishop of Durham in 1071.

=== County Palatine ===
The King also appointed Waltheof, an Anglo-Saxon of the old Northumbria house, as the new earl. Bishop William was on friendly terms with Earl Waltheof, who built a castle at Durham for the bishop. After another rebellion, Waltheof was executed in 1075 and in his place Walcher was appointed earl, becoming the first bishop to exercise secular authority over the area. Walcher was well-intentioned but proved an incompetent leader. He was murdered in Gateshead in 1081.

King William Rufus divided the Earldom into two parts: the lands north of the rivers Tyne and Derwent were ruled by the Earls of Northumberland, while the lands south of the rivers were put under the control of the Bishop of Durham.

The lands between the Tyne and Tees, ruled by the bishops, became known as the 'County Palatine of Durham', a defensive buffer zone between England and the Northumbria-Scottish borderland. Due to its strategic importance and its remoteness from London, the county palatine became a virtually autonomous entity, in which the bishop possessed the powers of a king. Specifically, the bishops had the authority to

- hold their own parliaments;
- raise their own armies;
- appoint their own sheriffs and justices;
- administer their own laws;
- levy taxes and customs duties;
- create fairs and markets;
- issue charters;
- salvage shipwrecks;
- collect revenue from mines;
- administer the forests;
- mint their own coins.

For a period Carlisle was also placed under the bishop's jurisdiction, to protect the north west of England.

Durham's exceptional status reached its zenith by 1300, when bishop Antony Beck remarked that:

There are two kings in England, namely the Lord King of England, wearing a crown in sign of his regality and the Lord Bishop of Durham wearing a mitre in place of a crown, in sign of his regality in the diocese of Durham.

To ensure that episcopal functions continued to be performed while the diocesan bishop was playing his part in political affairs of state, suffragan bishops were appointed. For instance, Bishop Thomas Langley served as chancellor to the Kings Henry IV, Henry V and Henry VI and was frequently away in London and occasionally overseas.

=== Demise ===
In 1536 Henry VIII greatly diminished the bishop's secular authority, which was further reduced during and after the English Civil War.

From 1537 to 1572, there was one suffragan Bishop of Berwick. Since 1572, the see has remained in abeyance (until 2016), and Berwick-upon-Tweed is now in Newcastle diocese.

After the Union of the crowns of England and Scotland in 1603, the County Palatinate, founded to check Scottish incursions, increasingly became an anachronism.

The palatinate was finally abolished on 5 July 1836. In 1844 the Islandshire exclave was transferred to the jurisdiction of Northumberland, while the Bishop's duty to maintain a major fortress overlooking the Tweed at Norham also came to an end. 1882 saw the Bishop lose the religious leadership for the whole of Northumbria when the part north of the River Tyne became the newly created Diocese of Newcastle. In 1971 the Courts Act modernised the English courts system and abolished the Palatinate courts.

Since 1906, there has again been a suffragan bishop in the diocese – the Bishop of Jarrow.

Still, people born in Bedlington or the other parts of old North Durham, had birth certificates issued with the County Palatine of Durham printed on them, and the North Durham satellite areas governed their areas as Urban District Councils still under the rule of Durham. This prevailed until 1974, when administrative boundaries were changed and all of these areas, and other "autonomous" towns connected to Durham, lost their independence.

Reuse of the title: in March 2016, when announcing the retirement of the assistant Bishop of Newcastle, the new suffragan bishop, when appointed, will have the title Bishop of Berwick.

=== Seals ===
To differentiate his ecclesiastical and civil functions, the bishops used two or more seals: the traditional almond-shaped seal of a cleric, and the oval seal of a nobleman. They also had a large round seal showing them seated administering justice on one side, and, on the other, armed and mounted on horseback. That design was, and still is, used by monarchs as the Great Seal of the Realm.

=== Coat of arms ===
As a symbol of his palatine jurisdiction, the Bishop of Durham's coat of arms was set against a crosier and a sword, instead of two crosiers, and the mitre above the coat of arms was encircled with a coronet, usually of the form known as a 'crest coronet' (and which is blazoned as a 'ducal coronet' though not actually the coronet of a duke). Although the jurisdiction was surrendered to the Crown in 1836, these heraldic symbols of their former power remain.

== Bishop's Palace ==
The bishop's palace is Auckland Castle in Bishop Auckland. Until the 1830s and the national mood at the time of the Great Reform Act, the bishop had at least two more castles; Norham Castle in Northumberland and his main Palace at Durham Castle, now occupied by Durham University. The bishop still has the right to use "his" suite at Durham Castle, although the right he retained to stable his horses in buildings adjacent to Palace Green in Durham has lapsed – it was noted in the preamble to the University of Durham Act 1935 (25 & 26 Geo. 5. c. 29) that the bishop no longer kept horses.

== Bishops ==
The diocesan Bishop of Durham, Rick Simpson, is supported by the Bishop suffragan of Jarrow, currently Sarah Clark. Alternative episcopal oversight (for parishes in the diocese who reject the ministry of priests who are women) is provided by the provincial episcopal visitor (PEV) the Bishop suffragan of Beverley, Stephen Race; he is licensed as an honorary assistant bishop of the diocese in order to facilitate his work there. Besides Race, there is also a retired honorary assistant bishops licensed in the diocese: retired Bishop of Salisbury David Stancliffe who lives in Stanhope since 2013 (he is also licensed in Europe diocese.)

== Archdeaconries and deaneries ==
The diocese is divided into three archdeaconries, those of Auckland, Durham and Sunderland.

=== Archdeacons of Sunderland ===
The archdeaconry of Sunderland was created from the Durham archdeaconry on 1 March 1997 to acknowledge Sunderland's new status as a city. The first archdeacon was Frank White (from 1997 to 2002) who was elevated as Bishop of Brixworth in 2002. He was succeeded by Stuart Bain in 2002, who resigned to become Provost of Sunderland Minster on 17 March 2018. Bain was succeeded by Bob Cooper on 3 July 2018 and Cooper left to become Dean of Guildford, effective 26 January 2025. Katherine Bagnall was collated Archdeacon of Sunderland on 30 September 2025.

=== Archdeaconries and deaneries ===
Diocese	Archdeaconries	Rural Deaneries
Diocese of Durham	Archdeaconry of Durham	Deanery of Durham
Diocese of Durham	Archdeaconry of Durham	Deanery of Easington
Diocese of Durham	Archdeaconry of Durham	Deanery of Hartlepool
Diocese of Durham	Archdeaconry of Durham	Deanery of Lanchester
Diocese of Durham	Archdeaconry of Auckland	Deanery of Auckland
Diocese of Durham	Archdeaconry of Auckland	Deanery of Barnard Castle
Diocese of Durham	Archdeaconry of Auckland	Deanery of Darlington
Diocese of Durham	Archdeaconry of Auckland	Deanery of Stanhope
Diocese of Durham	Archdeaconry of Auckland	Deanery of Stockton
Diocese of Durham	Archdeaconry of Sunderland	Deanery of Chester-le-Street and Houghton
Diocese of Durham	Archdeaconry of Sunderland	Deanery of Gateshead
Diocese of Durham	Archdeaconry of Sunderland	Deanery of Gateshead West
Diocese of Durham	Archdeaconry of Sunderland	Deanery of Jarrow
Diocese of Durham	Archdeaconry of Sunderland	Deanery of Wearmouth

== Churches ==
- Annfield Plain: St Thomas, Collierley
- Barnard Castle: St Mary
- Bearpark: St Edmund
- Billingham: St Aidan
- Billingham: St Cuthbert
- Billingham: St Luke
- Birtley: St John the Evangelist
- Bishop Auckland: St Andrew, South Church
- Bishop Auckland: St Anne
- Bishop Auckland: LEP, Woodhouse Close
- Bishop Middleham: St Michael
- Bishopton: St Peter
- Blackhall Colliery: St Andrew
- Blaydon: St Cuthbert
- Blaydon: St Paul, Winlaton
- Bolam: St Andrew
- Boldon Colliery: St Nicholas, Hedworth
- Bournmoor: St Barnabas
- Bowburn: Christ the King
- Brancepeth: St Brandon
- Brandon: St John the Evangelist
- Burnhope: St John the Evangelist
- Burnopfield: St James
- Byers Green: St Peter
- Castleside: St John the Evangelist
- Chester-le-Street: SS Mary & Cuthbert
- Chilton Moor: St Andrew
- Chilton: St Aidan
- Chopwell: St John the Evangelist
- Cleadon: All Saints
- Cockfield: St Mary
- Coniscliffe: St Edwin
- Consett: Christ Church
- Consett: St Cuthbert, Benfieldside
- Consett: St Ives, Leadgate
- Cornforth: Holy Trinity
- Coundon: St James
- Cowshill: St Thomas, Heatherycleugh
- Coxhoe: St Mary
- Crawcrook-and-Greenside: St John the Evangelist, Greenside
- Crawcrook-and-Greenside: Holy Spirit, Crawcrook
- Crook: St Catherine
- Croxdale: St Bartholomew
- Dalton-le-Dale: St Andrew
- Darlington: All Saints, Blackwell
- Darlington: St Andrew, Haughton-le-Skerne
- Darlington: St Columba
- Darlington: St Cuthbert
- Darlington: St Herbert
- Darlington: St James the Great
- Darlington: St Mark
- Darlington: St Mary, Cockerton
- Darlington: St Matthew
- Darlington: Holy Trinity
- Durham: Cathedral
- Durham: St Aidan, Framwellgate Moor
- Durham: All Saints, Newton Hall
- Durham: St Cuthbert
- Durham: St Giles
- Durham: St John the Evangelist, Neville's Cross
- Durham: St Margaret of Antioch
- Durham: St Mary Magdalene, Belmont
- Durham: St Nicholas
- Durham: St Oswald
- Easington: St Mary
- Easington Colliery: The Ascension
- Easington Lane: St Michael & All Angels, Lyons
- East-and-West-Boldon: St George, East Boldon
- East-and-West-Boldon: St Nicholas, Boldon
- East Rainton: St Cuthbert
- Eastgate: All Saints
- Ebchester: St Ebba
- Egglescliffe: All Saints, Preston-on-Tees
- Egglescliffe: St John the Baptist
- Eggleston: Holy Trinity
- Eldon: St Mark
- Elton: St John the Baptist
- Elwick Hall: St Peter
- Escomb: Parish Church
- Esh: St Michael & All Angels
- Etherley: St Cuthbert
- Evenwood: St Paul
- Ferryhill: St Luke
- Fishburn: St Catherine
- Forest-in-Teesdale: St James the Less
- Gainford: St Mary
- Gateshead: St Alban, Windy Nook
- Gateshead: All Saints, Lobley Hill
- Gateshead: St Andrew, Leam Lane
- Gateshead: St Chad, Bensham
- Gateshead: Christ Church, Felling
- Gateshead: St Edmund's Chapel (previously Holy Trinity / Trinity Chapel)
- Gateshead: St George
- Gateshead: St Helen, Low Fell
- Gateshead: SS James & Bede
- Gateshead: St John the Evangelist, Gateshead Fell
- Gateshead: St Mary, Heworth
- Gateshead: St Nicholas, Dunston
- Gateshead: St Ninian, Harlow Green
- Gateshead: St Thomas, Eighton Banks
- Girsby: All Saints
- Great Lumley: Christ Church
- Greatham: St John the Baptist
- Hamsterley: St James
- Hart: St Mary Magdalene
- Hartlepool: St Aidan
- Hartlepool: All Saints, Stranton
- Hartlepool: St Columba
- Hartlepool: St Hilda
- Hartlepool: St James, Owton Manor
- Hartlepool: St Luke
- Hartlepool: St Oswald
- Hartlepool: St Paul
- Hartlepool: Holy Trinity
- Hartlepool: Holy Trinity, Seaton Carew
- Haswell: St Paul
- Hawthorn: St Michael & All Angels
- Hebburn: St Cuthbert
- Hebburn: St John
- Hebburn: St Oswald
- Heighington: St Michael
- High Spen: St Patrick
- Horden: St Mary
- Houghton-le-Spring: St Michael & All Angels
- Hunwick: St Paul
- Hurworth-on-Tees: All Saints
- Ingleton: St John the Evangelist
- Jarrow: Christ Church, Jarrow Grange
- Jarrow: St John the Baptist
- Jarrow: St Paul
- Jarrow: St Peter
- Kelloe: St Helen
- Kimblesworth: SS Philip & James
- Kirk Merrington: St John the Evangelist
- Lamesley: St Andrew
- Lanchester: All Saints
- Langley Park: All Saints
- Longnewton: St Mary
- Low Dinsdale: St John the Baptist
- Low Westwood: Christ Church
- Lynesack: St John the Evangelist
- Marley Hill: St Cuthbert
- Medomsley: St Mary Magdalene
- Middleton St George: St George
- Middleton-in-Teesdale: St Mary the Virgin
- Murton: Holy Trinity
- New Brancepeth: St Catherine
- Newbottle: St Matthew
- Newton Aycliffe: St Andrew, Aycliffe
- Newton Aycliffe: St Clare
- Newton Aycliffe: St Elizabeth of Hungary, Woodham
- Newton Aycliffe: St Francis, Horndale
- Pelton: Holy Trinity
- Peterlee: St Cuthbert
- Piercebridge: St Mary
- Pittington: St Laurence
- Redmarshall: St Cuthbert
- Rowlands Gill: St Barnabas
- Ryton: Holy Cross
- Sadberge: St Andrew
- St Helen Auckland: St Helen
- Satley: St Cuthbert
- Seaham: All Saints, Deneside
- Seaham: Christ Church, New Seaham
- Seaham: St John the Evangelist, Seaham Harbour
- Seaham: St Mary the Virgin
- Sedgefield: St Edmund
- Shadforth: St Cuthbert
- Sherburn: St Mary
- Shildon: St John the Evangelist
- Shincliffe: St Mary the Virgin
- Shiney-Row-and-Penshaw: St Aidan, Herrington
- Shiney-Row-and-Penshaw: All Saints, Penshaw
- Shiney-Row-and-Penshaw: St Oswald, Shiney Row
- Shotton Colliery: St Saviour
- South Hetton: Holy Trinity
- South Shields: All Saints
- South Shields: St Hilda
- South Shields: St Jude, Rekendyke
- South Shields: St Lawrence the Martyr, Horsley Hill
- South Shields: SS Mark & Cuthbert, Cleadon Park
- South Shields: SS Mary & Martin, Whiteleas
- South Shields: St Michael & All Angels, South Westoe
- South Shields: St Peter, Harton
- South Shields: St Simon
- South Shields: St Stephen
- Spennymoor: St Andrew, Tudhoe Grange
- Spennymoor: St David, Tudhoe
- Spennymoor: St Paul
- St John's Chapel: St John the Baptist
- Staindrop: St Mary
- Stanhope: St Thomas
- Stanley: St Andrew
- Stillington: St John the Divine
- Stockton-on-Tees: Parish Church
- Stockton-on-Tees: All Saints, Hartburn
- Stockton-on-Tees: St Chad
- Stockton-on-Tees: St John the Baptist
- Stockton-on-Tees: St Mary the Virgin, Norton
- Stockton-on-Tees: St Michael & All Angels, Norton
- Stockton-on-Tees: St Paul
- Stockton-on-Tees: St Peter
- Stockton-on-Tees: Holy Trinity
- Sunderland: St Aidan, Grangetown
- Sunderland: All Saints, Monkwearmouth
- Sunderland: St Andrew, Roker
- Sunderland: St Chad
- Sunderland: St Cuthbert, Red House
- Sunderland: St Gabriel, Bishopwearmouth
- Sunderland: Good Shepherd, Bishopwearmouth
- Sunderland: St Ignatius, Hendon
- Sunderland: St Luke, Pallion
- Sunderland: St Matthew, Silksworth
- Sunderland: St Mary Magdalene, Millfield
- Sunderland: St Mary the Virgin, Springwell
- Sunderland: Minster Church of St Michael & All Angels & St Benedict Biscop, Bishopwearmouth
- Sunderland: St Nicholas, Bishopwearmouth
- Sunderland: St Paul, Ryhope
- Sunderland: St Peter, Monkwearmouth
- Sunderland: St Thomas, Pennywell
- Sunderland: Holy Trinity, Southwick
- Tanfield: St Margaret of Antioch
- Thornley: St Bartholomew
- Thorpe Thewles: St James (previously Holy Trinity)
- Tow Law: SS Philip & James
- Trimdon: St Mary Magdalene
- Trimdon Grange: St Alban
- Ushaw Moor: St Luke
- Washington: St George, Fatfield
- Washington: St Michael & All Angels, Sulgrave
- Washington: Holy Trinity
- Washington: Holy Trinity, Usworth
- Washington: LEP, Oxclose
- Waterhouses: St Paul
- West Pelton: St Paul
- West Rainton: St Mary
- Wheatley Hill: All Saints
- Whickham: St Mary the Virgin
- Whickham: Holy Trinity, Swalwell
- Whitburn: Parish Church
- Whitworth: Parish Church
- Whorlton: St Mary
- Willington: St Stephen
- Wingate: Holy Trinity
- Winston: St Andrew
- Witton Gilbert: St Michael & All Angels
- Witton-le-Wear: St Philip & St James
- Wolsingham: St Mary & St Stephen
- Wolviston: St Peter
- Woodland: St Mary

=== Dedications ===
St Aidan 6 - St Alban 2 - All Saints 17 - St Andrew 14 - St Anne 1 - Ascension 1 - St Barnabas 2 - St Bartholomew 2 - St Brendan 1 - St Catherine of Alexandria 3 - St Chad 3 - Christ Church 6 - Christ, St Mary & St Cuthbert 1 - Christ the King 1 - St Clare of Assisi 1 - St Columba 2 - Holy Cross 1 - St Cuthbert 14 - St David 1 - St Ebba of Coldingham 1 - St Edmund the Martyr 3 - St Edwin of Northumbria 1 - St Elizabeth of Hungary 1 - St Francis 1 - St Gabriel 1 - St George 4 - St Giles 1 - Good Shepherd 1 - St Helen 3 - St Herbert of Derwentwater 1 - St Hilda 2 - St Ignatius of Antioch 1 - St Ives 1 - St James 7 - SS James & Bede 1 - St James the Less 1 - St John the Baptist 7 - St John the Evangelist 15 - St Jude 1 - St Lawrence 2 - St Luke 5 - St Margaret 2 - St Mark 2 - SS Mark & Cuthbert 1 - St Mary the Virgin 21 - SS Mary & Cuthbert 1 - SS Mary & Martin 1 - SS Mary & Stephen 1 - St Mary Magdalene 5 - St Matthew 3 - St Michael 10 - SS Michael & Benedict Biscop 1 - St Nicholas 5 - St Ninian 1 - St Oswald of Northumbria 4 - St Patrick 1 - St Paul 12 - St Peter 8 - SS Philip & James 3 - St Saviour 1 - St Simon 1 - Holy Spirit 1 - St Stephen 2 - St Thomas 5 - Holy Trinity 14 - LEP 2 - No dedication 4

=== Former churches ===
- Billingham: St Mary Magdalene
- Castle Eden: St James
- Consett: St Aidan, Blackhill
- Darlington: St Hilda
- Darlington: St John the Evangelist
- Darlington: St Luke
- Darlington: St Paul
- Darlington: The Salutation
- Dipton: St John the Evangelist
- Durham: St Mary-le-Bow
- Frosterley: St Michael & All Angels
- Gateshead: Venerable Bede
- Gateshead: Christ Church
- Gateshead: Christ Church, Dunston
- Gateshead: St Cuthbert
- Gateshead: St Edmund
- Gateshead: St James
- Gateshead: St Mary the Virgin
- Grindon: St Thomas a Becket
- Hartlepool: Christ Church
- Hesleden: St John the Evangelist
- Hetton-le-Hole: St Nicholas
- Hutton Henry: St Francis
- Monk Hesleden: St Mary
- Quarrington Hill: St Paul
- Quebec: St John the Baptist
- Rookhope: St John the Evangelist
- Sacriston: St Peter
- Sockburn: All Saints
- South Shields: St Aidan
- South Shields: St Thomas
- Stanley: St George, South Moor
- Stanley Crook: St Thomas
- Stockton-on-Tees: St Mark
- Sunderland: St Mark, Millfield
- Sunderland: St Mary, Pennywell?
- Sunderland: St Mary, South Hylton
- Sunderland: St Oswald
- Sunderland: St Peter
- Sunderland: Holy Trinity
- Sunderland: St Wilfrid
- Sunnybrow: St John the Evangelist
- Westgate: St Andrew
