= Dianna Gwilliams =

American-British Anglican priest

The Very Reverend Dianna Gwilliams
- Dean Emerita of Guildford
- Diocese: Diocese of Guildford
- In office: 2013 to 2023
- Predecessor: Victor Stock

Orders
- Ordination: 1992 (deacon); 1994 (priest)

Personal details
- Born: Dianna Lynn Gwilliams; 26 May 1957 (age 69)
- Denomination: Anglicanism
- Education: University of California; King's College London

Dianna Lynn Gwilliams DL (born 26 May 1957) is an American-British retired Anglican priest. She served as Dean of Guildford, 2013–2023.

== Early life and education ==
Gwilliams was born on 26 May 1957 in Colorado, United States. She grew up in California, and was educated at Villa Park High School in Villa Park, California. She studied at the University of California, majoring in physics and chemistry, and graduating with two Bachelor of Arts (BA) degrees in 1978.

In 1978, she travelled to the United Kingdom to work as Sound Engineer on tour for a musical called The Witness. She was a sound engineer for 12 years.

From 1989 to 1992, she trained for ordained ministry on the Southwark Ordination Course, a part-time theological training course. She later studied youth ministry and theological education at King's College London, graduating with a Master of Arts (MA) degree in 2001.

== Ordained ministry ==
Gwilliams was ordained in the Church of England as a deacon in 1992 and as a priest in 1994. From 1992 to 1997, she was a non-stipendiary minister and assistant curate at St Saviour's Church, Peckham, known locally as the Copleston Church, in the Diocese of Southwark. She then moved into full-time ministry and became an assistant curate at St Barnabas' Church, Dulwich. In 1999, she was appointed vicar of St Barnabas' Church and chaplain of Christ's Chapel of God's Gift. She was additionally area dean of Dulwich from 2005 to 2012 and dean of women's ministry for the Diocese of Southwark from 2009 to 2012. In 2006, she was made an honorary canon of Southwark Cathedral. From 2007 to 2011, she was also priest-in-charge of Copleston Church, where she had started her ministry.

In April 2013, it was announced that Gwilliams had been appointed the next Dean of Guildford. She was installed as dean at Guildford Cathedral on 15 September 2013. She was the first female Dean of Guildford and, in 2013, was one of the most senior female priests in the Church of England, alongside five other female deans. She retired as dean in September 2023, after ten years in the role; her final service was evensong on 17 September.

=== Views ===
She was chair of Inclusive Church from 2012 until 2022; an organisation that educates on full inclusion of every person in the church regardless of "disability, economic power, ethnicity, gender, gender identity, learning disability, mental health, neurodiversity, or sexuality".

== Personal life ==
She has three children (including a daughter who died in infancy), five grandchildren and her husband is a stonemason. She is a Deputy Lieutenant of Surrey.

Church of England titles
Preceded by Victor Stock	Dean of Guildford; 2013–2023	Succeeded by Bob Cooper
