= Robert Long (priest) =

British Anglican priest

Robert Long (1833–1907) was a British Anglican priest, most notably Archdeacon of Auckland from 1881 until his death.

Long was born in Norfolk, educated at Corpus Christi College, Cambridge and ordained in 1856. 1856; After a curacy at St George, Bloomsbury he held incumbencies in Chelsea, Erith, Bishop Auckland and Bishop Wearmouth.
