= Alex Wedderspoon =

Alexander Gillan Wedderspoon (3 April 1931 – 10 June 2014) was an Anglican priest, academic, and British Army officer. He was Dean of Guildford from 1987 to 2001.

== Early life ==
Wedderspoon was born on 3 April 1931 in Glasgow, Scotland. His father was a Church of Scotland minister. He was educated at Westminster School, then an all-boys public school in London. After his military service, he went on to study at Jesus College, Oxford.

== Career ==
=== Military service ===
Wedderspoon undertook National Service as a commissioned officer in the British Army. He was commissioned on 1 April 1950 as a second lieutenant in the Royal Regiment of Artillery. On 16 December 1951, he was granted the acting rank of lieutenant. He relinquished his commission, therefore ending his liability for call up, on 1 February 1962.

=== Religious life ===
Wedderspoon was ordained in 1961. He was then a curate in Kingston upon Thames, a lecturer in religious education at the University of London, priest in charge of St Margaret's, Westminster and then a canon residentiary at Winchester Cathedral before his appointment at Guildford Cathedral, a position he held for 14 years.

== Later life ==
He died on 10 June 2014.

== Notes ==
Church of England titles
Preceded by Anthony Cyprian Bridge	Dean of Guildford; 1987–2001	Succeeded by Victor Andrew Stock
