= Victor Stock =

English Anglican priest

Victor Andrew Stock AKC (born 24 December 1944) is a retired English Anglican priest. He was the Dean of Guildford in the Church of England. Apart from his being an Associate of King's College, he is also a member of the Order of Australia (OAM), an (Honorary) Doctor of the University of Surrey, and Fellow of the Royal Society of Arts (FRSA). He is now Priest Vicar of Westminster Abbey.

He has taken part in many discussions on science and religion and was featured as a guest on BBC Radio 4's The Infinite Monkey Cage 2012 and 2015 Christmas specials.

Stock was educated at Christopher Wren School, West London and King's College London. Ordained in 1970, he was a curate in Pinner and then Chaplain of the University of London’s Church of Christ the King, Gordon Square. He was Rector of St James and St John Friern Barnet from 1979 to 1986 and of St Mary-le-Bow in the City of London from 1986 until 2002. He retired as Dean of Guildford on 31 July 2012, becoming dean emeritus. He is an honorary assistant priest at St Paul's Church, Knightsbridge.

Church of England titles
Preceded by Alex Wedderspoon	Dean of Guildford; 2002–2012	Succeeded by Dianna Gwilliams
