= Nettlesworth =

Village in County Durham, England

Coordinates: 54.824°N 1.602°W

- Location within County Durham
- OS grid reference: NZ256477
- Unitary authority: County Durham
- Ceremonial county: County Durham
- Region: North East
- Country: England
- Sovereign state: United Kingdom
- Post town: CHESTER LE STREET
- Postcode district: DH2
- Dialling code: 0191
- Police: Durham
- Fire: County Durham and Darlington
- Ambulance: North East
- UK Parliament: North Durham

Nettlesworth is a small village in County Durham, in England. It is situated to the south of Chester-le-Street, near Sacriston. Nettlesworth is adjoined with an old mining village called Kimblesworth. Nettlesworth has a school, Nettlesworth Primary School. As of the 2021 census, Nettlesworth has a population of 899. Nettlesworth was home to The Black Bull Public House which was permanently closed and demolished in 2009, leaving the closest pub the nearby Red Lion.
