= Stuart Bain =

Archdeacon of Sunderland

John Stuart Bain (born 12 October 1955) was the Archdeacon of Sunderland from 2002 until 2018.

== Early life ==
White was educated at Van Mildert College, Durham and trained for ordination at Westcott House, Cambridge.

== Ordained ministry ==
Bain was ordained in 1981 and served curacies in Washington and Dunston. He was Area Dean of Auckland from 1996 to 2002; was made an Honorary Canon of Durham Cathedral from 1998 to 2002; and Archdeacon of Sunderland in 2002.

== Personal life ==
Bain married Angela Forster in 1978: they have two sons and one daughter.

Stuart was the father of video game commentator John Bain (TotalBiscuit).

== Styles ==
- The Reverend Stuart Bain (1981–2002; 2018–present)
- The Venerable Stuart Bain (2002–2018)

Church of England titles
Preceded by Frank White	Archdeacon of Sunderland; 2002–2018	Succeeded by Bob Cooper
