= Tony Bridge =

British artist and Anglican priest

Antony Cyprian "Tony" Bridge (5 September 1914 – 23 April 2007) was a British artist who became an Anglican priest. He was Dean of Guildford for 18 years, from 1968 to 1986, and wrote several books on the history of Constantinople and the Crusades.

== Education and painting ==
Bridge's father was Royal Navy Commander Cyprian Dunscomb Charles Bridge. Bridge and his younger brother, Nigel, were educated at Marlborough College. His brother became a barrister and then a judge, serving as a Lord of Appeal in Ordinary from 1980 to 1992.

After school, where his artistic talent had been recognised, Bridge studied at the Royal Academy School of Art, where he was influenced by Post-Impressionism. Living on a small private income, he became an artist in the 1930s. For a period, he shared a studio with Dylan Thomas and spent the summers from 1934 to 1937 in Sark, Channel Islands, in the colony of artists which included Mervyn Peake and Peter Scott.

== During and after World War II ==
Bridge enlisted as a private in the British Army on the outbreak of the Second World War in 1939. He was commissioned in the Buffs in 1940, and served in Egypt and North Africa, interpreting aerial photographs. He joined the staff at the School of Military Intelligence at Matlock in Derbyshire in 1943. He was demobilised in 1945 in the rank of major.

He returned to painting after the war, and exhibited in London, but his wartime experiences had affected him profoundly: he found his earlier atheism dissolving, being replaced by a strong Christian belief. He described his conversion in his book, One Man's Advent, published in 1985.

== Ordained ministry ==
Bridge decided to seek ordination and, in an interview with the Archbishop of Canterbury, Geoffrey Fisher, said that he did not really want to become a priest but could see little alternative. He studied at Lincoln Theological College from 1953 and was ordained as a priest in the Church of England in 1955. He moved to Romney Marsh to become curate of Hythe in Kent. He was appointed as vicar of Christ Church at Lancaster Gate in Paddington in 1958.

Prostitution was prevalent in his parish, but it also contained many young professionals living in bedsits. He preached on intellectual themes, such as the theological purpose of Picasso and Iris Murdoch, and brought in large congregations. Bridge was appointed as Dean of Guildford Cathedral in 1968, only seven years after the new cathedral was consecrated, serving in that post for 18 years until 1986. He took little pleasure in his administrative duties, but continued to enjoy preaching. He was a member of the advisory council of the Victoria and Albert Museum from 1976 to 1979, and also lectured on Greek and Turkish art on cruises in the Mediterranean.

He retired in 1986. He later became a Fellow of the Society of Antiquaries.

== Publications ==
He wrote several books, including Theodora: Portrait in a Byzantine Landscape (1978), The Crusades (1980), Suleiman the Magnificent (1983), One Man's Advent (1985) and Richard the Lionheart (1989).

== Marriage and family ==
Bridge married twice. He married artist Brenda Lois Streatfeild in 1937. They had two daughters and a son together Bridge married a second time in 1996, to Diana Joyce Readhead. He was survived by his second wife and the three children from his first marriage.

== Sources ==
- "Obituary", The Times, 26 April 2007
- "Obituary" The Daily Telegraph, 2 May 2007
- Site produced by Diana Bridge, wife to the late Antony Bridge, in memorial of his life and works

Church of England titles
Preceded by George William Clarkson	Dean of Guildford; 1968–1986	Succeeded by Alexander Gillan Wedderspoon
