= Church of St James the Great, Darlington =

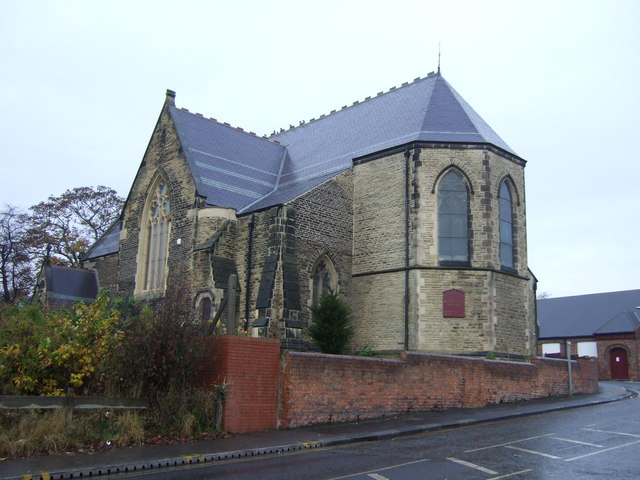
- Church of St James the Great, Darlington
- Church of St James the Great, Darlington
- 54°31′59″N 1°32′19″W
- OS grid reference: NZ 29950 15395
- Location: Allen Street, Albert Hill, Darlington, DL1 2LD
- Country: England
- Denomination: Church of England
- Churchmanship: Traditional Catholic

History
- Status: Active
- Consecrated: 30 August 1876

Architecture
- Functional status: Parish church
- Heritage designation: Grade II listed
- Architect(s): Ross and Lamb, Darlington
- Groundbreaking: 14 April 1875
- Completed: 30 August 1876

Specifications
- Length: 104 feet (32 m)

Administration
- Diocese: Diocese of Durham
- Archdeaconry: Archdeaconry of Auckland
- Parish: St. James, Albert Hill

Clergy
- Bishop: The Rt Revd Stephen Race SSC (AEO)

The Church of St James the Great is a Church of England parish church in Darlington, County Durham. The church is a grade II listed building.

== History ==
The parish was created in 1872 when it was taken out of the parish of St John's Church, Darlington. The plans for the new church were drawn up in 1873 by the architects Ross and Lamb of Darlington and the foundation stone was laid by the Mayor of Darlington, H.F. Pease on 14 April 1875. Simpson and Cowling were the contractors responsible for the masonry. The joinery was undertaken by R.T. Smith. The slating was given to Pattison and Son and the plumbing and glazing to R. Smith. The clerk of works was Mr. Davison. All of the contractors were local employers.

The church was built in a cruciform shape with an aisleless nave. It was consecrated by the Bishop of Durham Rt Revd Charles Baring on 30 August 1876.

On 28 April 1952, the church was designated a grade II listed building.

=== Present day ===
In 2012, the parish priest and at least 50 members of the congregation left St James' and the Church of England to join the Ordinariate of the Roman Catholic Church.

The parish stands in the Traditional Catholic tradition of the Church of England. As it rejects the ordination of women, the church receives alternative episcopal oversight from the Bishop of Beverley (currently Stephen Race).

== Organ ==
A pipe organ was installed in 1900 by Lewis and Co and dedicated on 28 June 1900 by the vicar of Darlington, Revd. F. W. Mortimer. The specification can be found on the National Pipe Organ Register. This organ was later sold to St Andrew's Church, Ingleby Greenhow in North Yorkshire and replaced by an electronic instrument.
