= Bob Cooper (priest) =

British Archdeacon

The Very Reverend Bob Cooper
- Dean of Guildford
- Diocese: Diocese of Guildford
- In office: 2025 – present
- Predecessor: Dianna Gwilliams
- Previous post: Archdeacon of Sunderland (2018–2025)

Orders
- Ordination: 1993 (deacon); 1994 (priest)

Personal details
- Born: Robert Gerard Cooper; 26 July 1968 (age 58) Oldham, Lancashire, England
- Denomination: Anglicanism
- Spouse: Katherine (m. 1991)
- Children: 4
- Education: Blue Coat School, Oldham
- Alma mater: UCW Aberystwyth, Lincoln Theological College, University of Nottingham

Robert Gerard "Bob" Cooper (born 26 July 1968) is the Dean of Guildford, an honorary canon of Durham Cathedral and a canon of Musoma Cathedral in Mara, Tanzania; he was previously Archdeacon of Sunderland from 2018.

He was formerly Area Dean of Pontefract and Vicar of St Giles' Church, Pontefract.

He held parish ministry positions in the former Dioceses of Ripon and Leeds and Wakefield (now the Diocese of Leeds) and was a school chaplain in Leeds before spending a year as a chaplain in a school in Essex. He has been visiting Mara, Tanzania since 2000.

He was elected to General Synod of the Church of England by the Diocese of Leeds.

On 3 October 2024, it was announced that Cooper was to become the next Dean of Guildford on 26 January 2025; as such he is the primus inter pares (first among equals) of the clergy at Guildford Cathedral, the mother church of the Diocese of Guildford.

Church of England titles
Preceded by Stuart Bain	Archdeacon of Sunderland; 2018–2025	TBA
Preceded by Dianna Gwilliams	Dean of Guildford; 2025–present	Incumbent
