= Strank =

Strank is a British surname. Notable people with the surname include:

- Angela Strank (born 1952), British geologist
- Michael Strank (1919–1945), United States Marine Corps sergeant

== See also ==
- Stranks
