= Fulthorpe =

Fulthorpe is a surname. Notable people with the surname include:

- Helen Fulthorpe, contestant on season 11 of The X Factor
- Robert Fulthorpe (1683–1753), English lawyer and politician
