= St Aidan's Church, Blackhill =

Church building in Blackhill, County Durham, England

Coordinates: 54.8587°N 1.8435°W

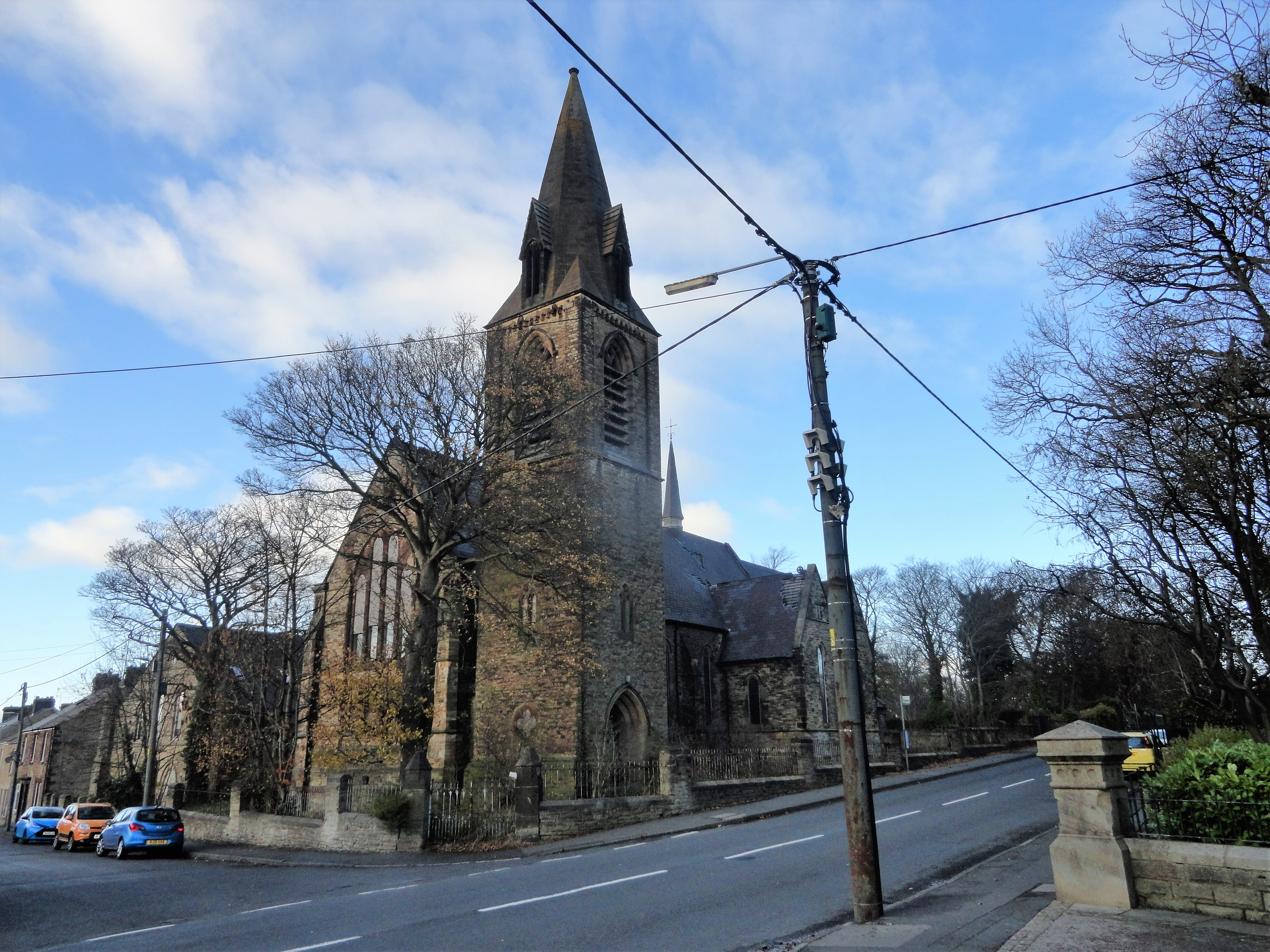
St Aiden's Church, Laburnum Street, Consett

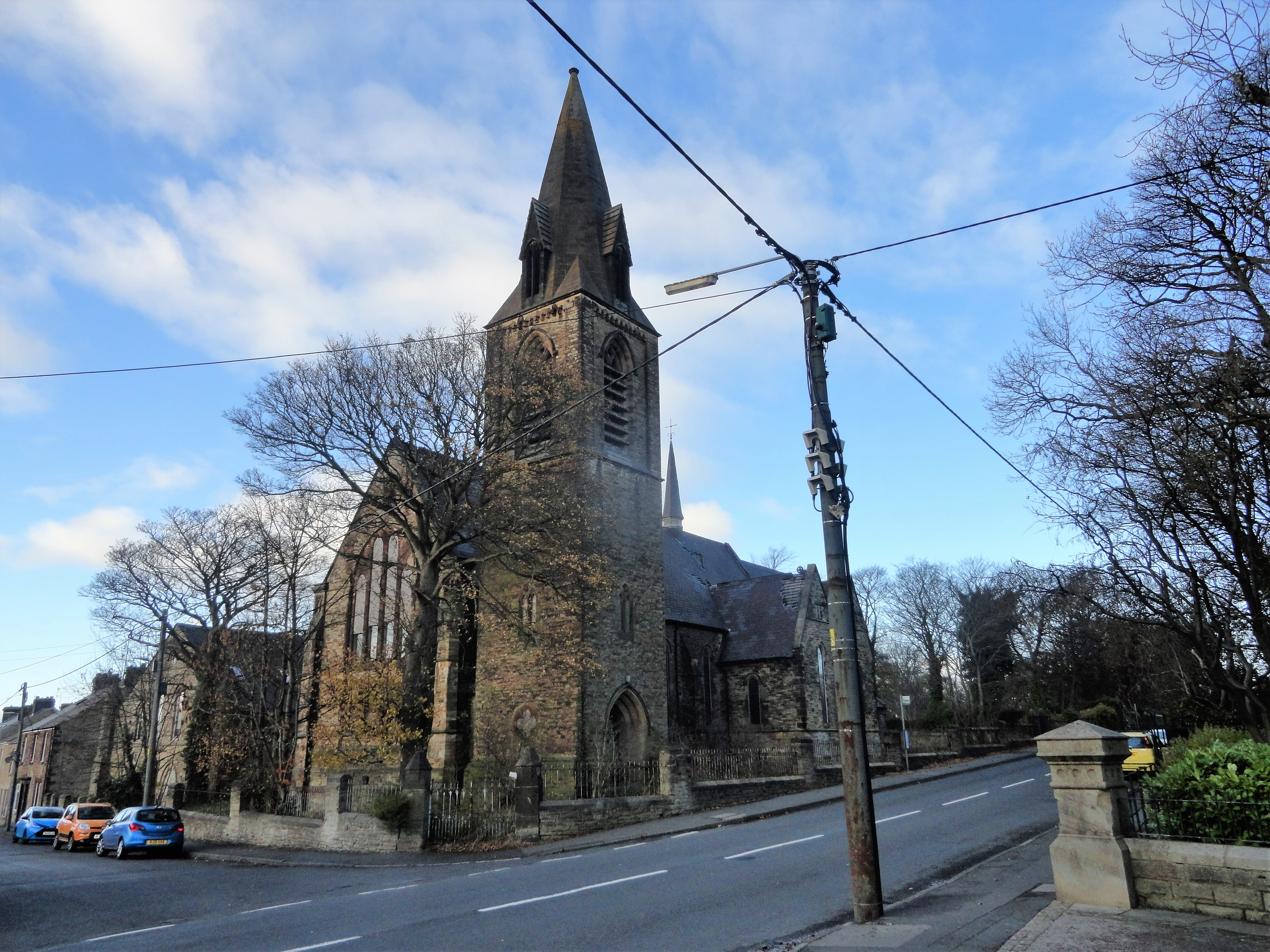
Disrepair of the church roof

St. Aiden's Church is a former church in the Blackhill area of Consett, County Durham, England. It was built in 1885 from sandstone with a slate roof, on land donated by the Consett Iron Company. A tower was added in 1903, which housed 8 bells cast by Mears & Stainbank in 1922. The church was granted grade II listed status in January 1987, it closed on 31 December 1995 and the bells were later transferred to South Shields.

The church then fell into disrepair and by December 2024 was considered such an "eyesore" that Durham County Council fined the current owners, Purvis Construction NE Ltd, £10,000 for failing to carry out essential repairs. In July 2025 it was found that no further works had started and they were fined an additional £124,800 which amounted to £500 per day since the original prosecution.
