= Dean of Guildford =

Church of England senior clergy member

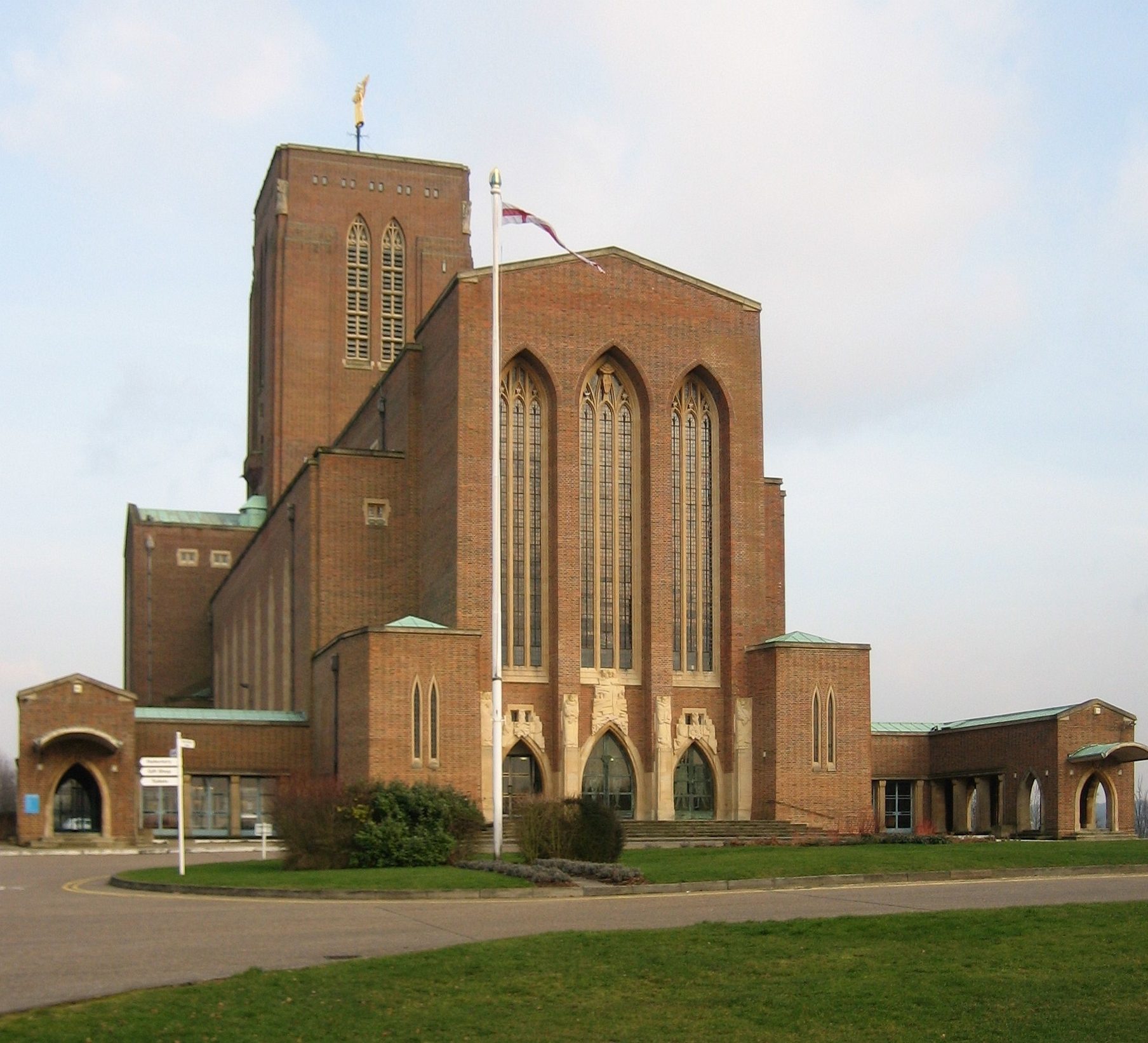
Guildford Cathedral

The Dean of Guildford is the head (primus inter pares – first among equals) and chair of the chapter of canons, the ruling body of Guildford Cathedral. The dean and chapter are based at the Cathedral Church of the Holy Spirit in Guildford. The cathedral is the mother church of the Diocese of Guildford and seat of the Bishop of Guildford. The current dean is Bob Cooper, since his institution on 26 January 2025.

== List of deans ==
- 1961–1965 George Clarkson
- 1968–1986 Tony Bridge
- 1987–2001 Alex Wedderspoon
- 2002–2012 Victor Stock
- 31 July 2012 – 4 September 2013 Nicholas Thistlethwaite (Acting Dean)
- 4 September 2013 – 30 September 2023 Dianna Gwilliams
- 26 January 2025 – present Bob Cooper

== Sources ==
- Window on Woking – 1927 Diocese of Guildford Bishops Deans and Archdeacons of Dorking
