= Derek Hodgson (priest) =

Anglican priest (1931-2007)

John Derek Hodgson (15 November 1931 – 22 November 2007) was an Anglican priest in the last decades of the 20th century and the first of the 21st.

Born on 15 November 1931, he was educated at King James School, Bishop Auckland and St John's College, Durham. After a short service commission in the Durham Light Infantry he was ordained in 1954 and began his career with curacies in Hartlepool and Sunderland. He held incumbencies at Stillington, Consett, and Gateshead before becoming Archdeacon of Auckland in 1983, serving for a decade. In 1993 he became Archdeacon of Durham and served for four years. He died on 22 November 2007.
