= Tudhoe Grange =

Coordinates: 54.702°N 1.607°W

- Location within County Durham
- OS grid reference: NZ254341
- Unitary authority: County Durham
- Ceremonial county: County Durham
- Region: North East
- Country: England
- Sovereign state: United Kingdom
- Post town: Darlington
- Postcode district: DL16
- Police: Durham
- Fire: County Durham and Darlington
- Ambulance: North East

Tudhoe Grange is a suburb of Spennymoor, in County Durham, in England. Originally it was just a couple of farms on the edge of Tudhoe township, swallowed up as Spennymoor expanded through the 19th and 20th centuries, especially by housing for workers at Tudhoe Iron Works.

The area included Tudhoe Grange School, formally Tudhoe Grange Comprehensive School. After the 100 year anniversary of its opening, Tudhoe Grange School closed in September 2012. Present students joined and moved sites to Spennymoor School, where the newly refurbished site was named as Whitworth Park School and Sixth Form College in 2012. The school is now named Whitworth Park Academy.
