= Woodhouse Close Estate =

Housing estate in England

Coordinates: 54°38′47″N 1°41′19″W

Woodhouse Close Estate: Woodhouse
- Housing Estate
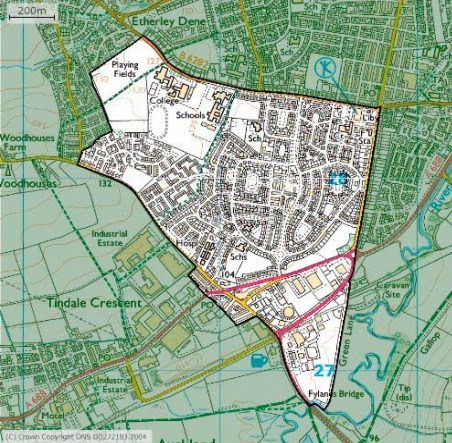

- Location within the United Kingdom
- Area: 2.284 km^{2} (0.882 sq mi)
- Population: 8,238
  - Density: 3604/km²
- Country: England
- Sovereign state: United Kingdom
- UK Parliament: Bishop Auckland

Woodhouse Close Estate or locally "Woodhouse" is a post-war former council housing estate, located to the south of Bishop Auckland, County Durham, England. It is not to be confused with a nearby hamlet named "Woodhouses". The estate was built to house hundreds of families who were displaced due to their villages being ruled a "Category D" Village. In an area classified as D, this meant that no future development would be permitted, and property would be acquired and demolished. Woodhouse Close now has multiple villages which are situated on the outskirts of the estate such as Tindale Crescent and Etherley Dene.

== History ==
=== 1800–1940 ===
Originally the land housed Woodhouse Close Farm, and Woodhouse Close Colliery (also known as Tindale Colliery) from 1835. The Colliery was located just south of where "Woodhouse Lane" is today. There was also a "New" Woodhouse Close Colliery built where "Weardale Drive" is situated now and a tramway linked the two. Both collieries were owned by The "Woodhouse Close Colliery Co., Ltd". The collieries both closed in March 1934 and the site remained derelict. In the 1930s a plan for a new housing development called "Woodhouse Close" was proposed but was interrupted by World War II.

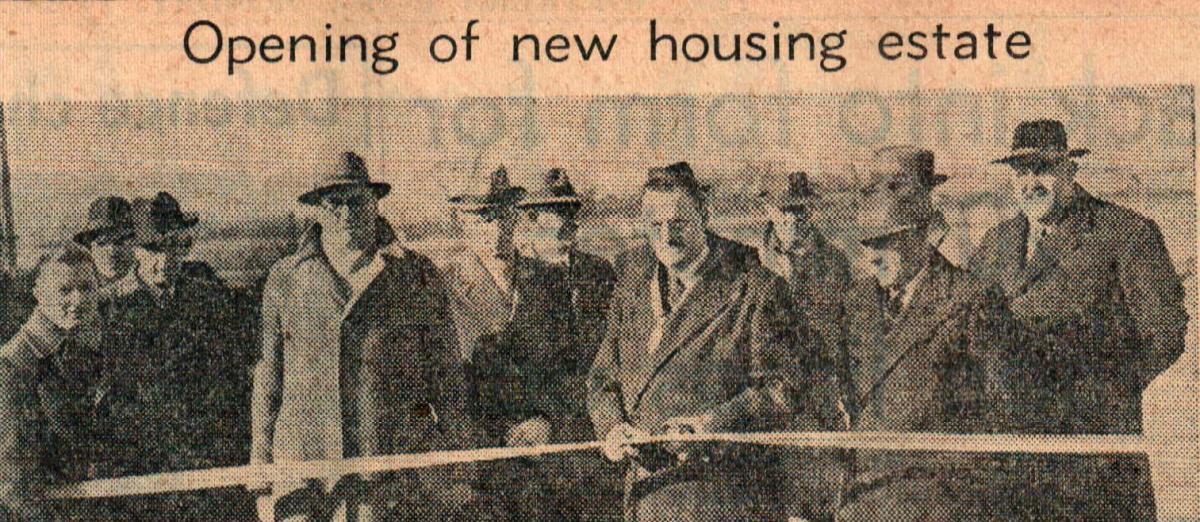
The Official Opening Of Woodhouse Close

=== 1940–1980 ===
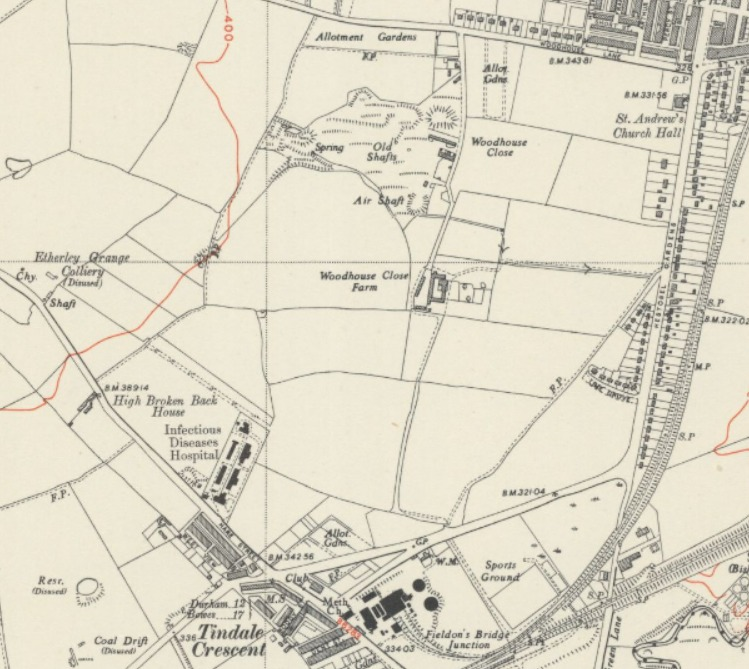
Woodhouse Close in 1939

In 1947 168 acres of land including Woodhouse Close Farm was bought from the Ecclesiastical Commissioners, for £100,000 by Bishop Auckland Urban District Council they then spent £17,651 levelling the pit-heaps and filling in three pit-shafts. Construction of the first homes was delayed due to a shortage of cement and then again by a shortage of bricks. On 17 February 1951 six "permanent traditional type houses" were complete and the official opening was held at the Watling Road entrance to the estate. Streets were originally numbered but eventually were given names after local councillors.

=== 1980–present ===
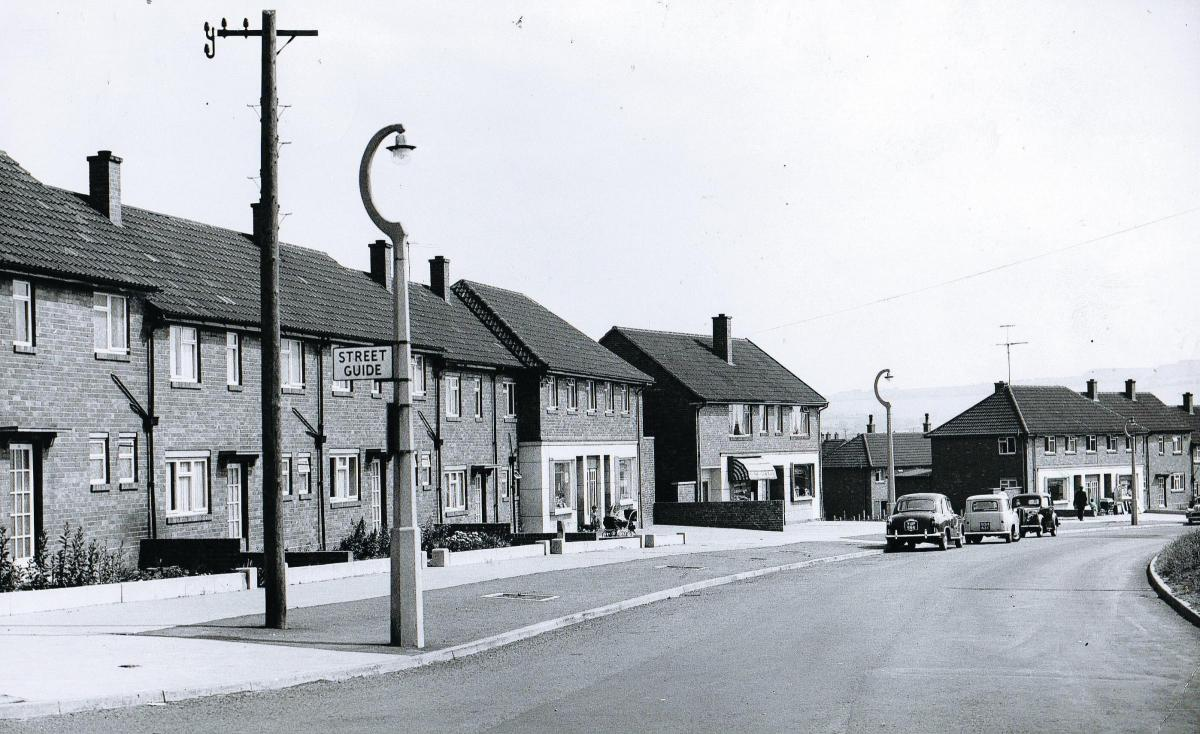
Proudfoot Drive Shopping Street in Woodhouse Close

In the early 1980s a mineshaft opened up on Fawcett Close/Lusby Crescent part of the estate. In the late 90s early 2000s many properties on the estate were empty and were beginning to attract crime and anti-social behaviour so Wear Valley District Council earmarked properties that were empty to be demolished this resulted in a big portion of Kitchen Avenue and Ford Way to be demolished. Along with the houses in the late 2000s "The Two Blues" pub in the centre of the estate closed and was demolished.

In 2008 the Woodhouse Close Children's Centre was opened. In 2012 work started on the estate to refurbish the council owned homes, the bathrooms and kitchens mainly this accompanied the work which began in 2015 of replacing all the fencing on the council owned properties and providing off street parking for all council owned houses. In 2020 all homes within the estate which were council owned were sold to Believe Housing. In 2020 Believe Housing unveiled plans to replace homes which were demolished by Wear Valley District Council in the early 2000s and work began on sites in Howard Close and Lusby Crescent, work on the site on Kitchen Avenue has entered the planning stages and Archer Avenue's site is yet to see progress. In 2022 work began on making the homes on Proudfoot Drive greener this included rendering the front of the homes and applying solar panels to the roofs to decrease energy bills for residents.

== Woodhouse Close Church ==
Woodhouse Close Church was built by the Methodist Church in 1962 When a nearby Anglican Church closed, the congregation began sharing the building. In 1971 the people came together as a single congregation. The Church shares its building with a community centre which is led by Anne Ramshaw.

== Auckland Youth and Community Centre ==
The Auckland Youth and Community Centre (AYCC) or sometimes called "The Boysy" is a community hub in the centre of Woodhouse Close Estate which opened in 1964. They provide support to people of all ages and needs, through a wide range of activities, interventions, learning experiences and events. The AYCC also host trips and events to support people in the local community. The AYCC's building has a range of spaces which accommodate a lot of events and activities for residents of the area.
