= Charles Stranks =

British Anglican priest and author

Charles James Stranks (10 May 1901 – 30 August 1981) was a British Anglican priest and author.

Stranks was born in Buckinghamshire, educated at Durham University and St Boniface College, Warminster; and ordained in 1926. After a curacy in Leeds he was a missionary in Japan from 1928 to 1940. He was the Vicar of Morecambe from 1941 to 1947; Warden of Whalley Abbey from 1947 from 1947 to 1953; a Canon at Durham University from 1954; and Archdeacon of Auckland from 1958 to 1973.
