= Archdeacon of Auckland =

Church of England ecclesiastical office

The archdeaconry of Auckland is a post in the Church of England Diocese of Durham. It was created from the Archdeaconry of Durham by Order-in-Council on 23 May 1882, when the Diocese of Newcastle was created from Durham's other two archdeaconries.

== List of archdeacons ==
- June – November 1882: Henry Watkins
- 1882-1907: Robert Long
- 1908-1914: Edwin Price
- 1914–1928: Percy Derry
- 1929–1936: Alfred Rawlinson, Canon of Durham and bishop's examining chaplain (afterwards Bishop of Derby)
- 1936–1943: Leslie Owen (Bishop suffragan of Jarrow from 1939; afterwards Bishop suffragan of Maidstone and Bishop of Lincoln)
- 1944–1949: Colin Dunlop, Bishop suffragan of Jarrow (afterwards Dean of Lincoln)
- 1950–1958: John Ramsbotham, Bishop suffragan of Jarrow
- 1958–1973: Charles Stranks
- 1974–1983: George Marchant
- 1983–1993: Derek Hodgson (afterwards Archdeacon of Durham)
- 1993–2001: Granville Gibson
- 2001–2006: Ian Jagger (afterwards Archdeacon of Durham)
- 2007–2017: Nick Barker
- 2018–2026: Rick Simpson
- 2026–present: Stephen Edmonds
