= Kimblesworth =

Village in County Durham, England

Coordinates: 54.819°N 1.597°W

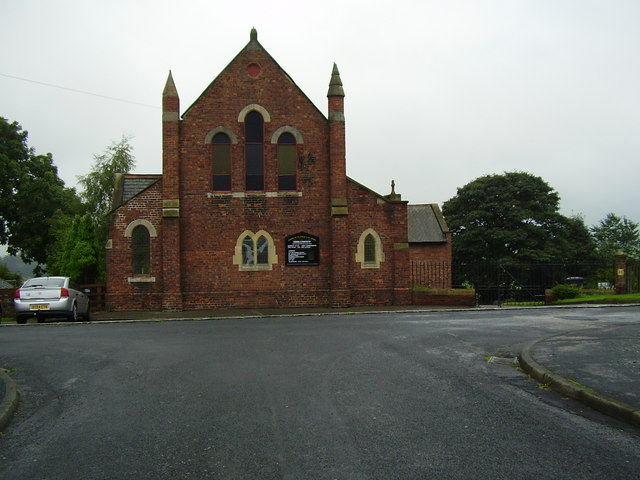
- Local Church in Kimblesworth, County Durham

- Location within County Durham
- Population: 1,614
- OS grid reference: NZ259473
- Civil parish: Kimblesworth and Plawsworth
- Unitary authority: County Durham
- Ceremonial county: Durham
- Region: North East
- Country: England
- Sovereign state: United Kingdom
- Post town: CHESTER LE STREET
- Postcode district: DH2
- Dialling code: 0191
- Police: Durham
- Fire: County Durham and Darlington
- Ambulance: North East
- UK Parliament: North Durham

Kimblesworth is a village and former civil parish, now in the parish of Kimblesworth and Plawsworth, in the County Durham district, in the ceremonial county of Durham, England. It is situated between Durham and Chester-le-Street. The population Kimblesworth and Plawsworth at the 2011 Census was 1,614.

It is home to Kimblesworth Cricket club, who due to financial reasons now play in the North East Durham cricket league.

== Civil parish ==
Kimblesworth was formerly an extra-parochial tract, from 1858 Kimblesworth was a civil parish in its own right, on 1 April 1937 the parish was abolished and became part of "Kimblesworth & Plawsworth", Sacriston and Witton Gilbert. In 1961 the parish had a population of 478.
