= Water trough =

Device to fill steam locomotives

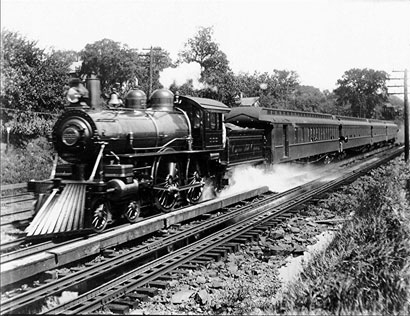
New York Central Railroad's Empire State Express takes on water from the track pan at Palatine, New York, in 1905.

A water trough (British terminology), or track pan (American terminology), is a device to enable a steam locomotive to replenish its water supply while in motion. It consists of a long trough filled with water, lying between the rails. When a steam locomotive passes over the trough, a water scoop can be lowered by the fireman, and the speed of forward motion forces water into the scoop, up the scoop pipe and into the tanks or locomotive tender.

== Origin ==
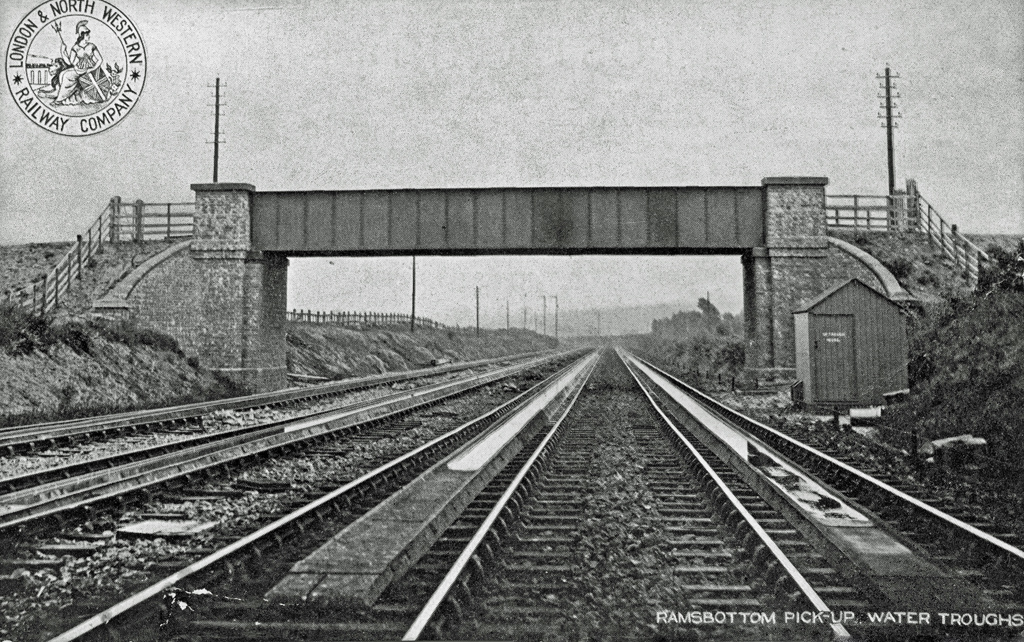
Ramsbottom water troughs on a four-line stretch of the West Coast Main Line, England, in 1904

Steam locomotives consume a considerable amount of water, and the tender or side tanks need to be replenished at intervals. Traditionally the engine water was replenished during station stops, but if it was desired to run long distances without stopping, the requirement to take water was a significant limitation. The Railway Magazine reported a development by John Ramsbottom:

In the year 1860 the London and North-Western Company having decided to accelerate the Irish mail [express train], Mr. Ramsbottom, then their chief mechanical engineer, was asked to make the run between Chester and Holyhead, 84 3/4 miles [136.4 km], in 2 hours 5 minutes... It was clear that if the usual stop on the road to take in water could be avoided, an important point would be gained; but there were no tenders of sufficient capacity to hold the quantity of water required to enable an engine to run through without stopping. In an ordinary way, from 1,800 to 1,900 gallons [8,200 to 8,600 L] were consumed, but in the rough and stormy weather frequently experienced along the exposed coast of North Wales it was not unusual for the consumption to rise to 2,400 gallons [11,000 L]; whilst the largest tenders only held 2,000 gallons [9,100 L].

Ramsbottom arranged some experiments and showed that the forward motion of a scoop in a trough of water would force water up a connected pipe and into a tank. He calculated the quasi-static head produced by the forward motion:

…at a velocity of 15 miles an hour [24 km/h] the water is lifted 7 1/2 ft. [2.3 m], this was exactly the result attained in practice by the apparatus; at this speed the water was raised to the top of the delivery pipe (7 1/2 ft. [2.3 m]), and was there maintained without running over into the tender whilst the scoop was in action. Again, theoretically the maximum amount of water the pipe was capable of raising was 1,148 gallons [5,220 L]—5 tons—and this was reached when the engine was moving at the rate of about 80 miles an hour [130 km/h]. The result of experiments made at different speeds was that at 22 miles an hour [35 km/h] the delivery was 1,060 gallons [4,800 L]; 33, 1,080; 41, 1,150; and 50, 1,070 [53, 4,900; 66, 5,200; and 80, 4,900]; showing that the quantity delivered varies very little at speeds above 22 miles an hour [35 km/h], which is accounted for by the shorter times the scoop is passing through the water.

The track is raised a little over a short distance at each end of the trough, so that the engine, and the scoop which may already be lowered, descend into the trough:

Many people think the scoop is let down into the water whilst the engine is passing over the trough, and has to be withdrawn immediately it readies the further end; but this method would not work, the time is too short. The scoop may be lowered at any distance before it arrives at the trough, and will run clear of everything until, by a very simple and ingenious arrangement, it dips automatically into the water to the required depth of 2 in [5 cm]. The rails at each side of the trough are laid on a level slightly lower than the surface of the water, and as the engine descends to this level, the scoop, which is so adjusted that the lower edge is the same height as the rails, descends with it and becomes immersed in the water. To save lowering the line the whole distance, a short incline is made, rising to a height of about 6 in. [15 cm] at a point 16 yards [15 m] from the commencement of the trough; the line then falls to the level it maintains until it reaches the further extremity of the trough, when there is again a slight rise which carries the scoop out of the water and clear of the end of the trough.

The first installation was brought into use on 23 June 1860 at Mochdre, Conwy, on the London and North Western Railway's (LNWR) North Wales Coast Line, midway between Chester and Holyhead.

The siting of the troughs requires a long enough length of straight and level track (although very large radius curves could be accommodated). For instance, the LNWR placed water troughs within the Standedge Tunnels, as they were the only sufficiently straight and level portion of the line between Huddersfield and Manchester. There must be a good water supply nearby. In hard water areas, water softening plant may have been considered necessary.

== Locomotive equipment ==
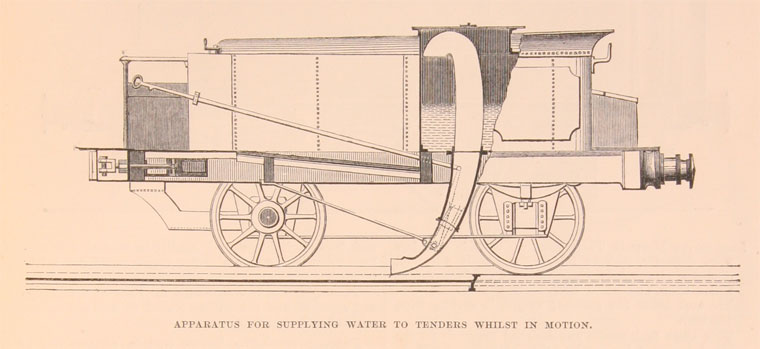
Diagram of LNWR tender apparatus from 1862

A scoop was fitted to the underside of the locomotive's tender (or the locomotive itself in the case of tank locomotives) in such a way that it could be raised or lowered, by a hand-operated screw or a power mechanism. The scoop fed into a vertical pipe that discharged into the water tank. The scoop was purposely made of light construction so that, should it strike an obstruction, it tore away, causing no serious damage to the locomotive or its trailing vehicles.

Tender locomotives generally picked up in the forward direction only. Tank locomotives were not usually fitted with water scoops, but some larger tank locomotives, such as on the Lancashire and Yorkshire Railway, were and in these cases they were equipped to pick up in either direction.

The scoop needed to be lowered at speed at the correct location – shortly before the start of the trough – and raised again when either the tank is full, or at the end of the trough. Failure to raise the scoop promptly when the tanks are full would resulted in large volumes of water being expelled from the vents, soaking the tender and footplate. The fireman therefore had to observe the water level indicator (a float in the tank, connected to an external pointer) carefully and be poised to retract the scoop as necessary. Lineside indicators were provided to assist engine crews in determining the location; in the UK it was a large white rectangular board with a black horizontal zigzag marking. On American railroads, illuminated trackside signals were employed for night-time usage, to indicate the start and approaching end of the track pan.

A 1934 report said that the LMS had carried out tests recently and introduced a deflector 1 ft 4 in (41 cm) ahead of the scoop to pile water in the centre of the trough, thus reducing spillage out of the troughs by about 400 gallons (1,800 L) (about 20%) for each use.

Venting on the tender needed to be free to allow a high rate of release of expelled air from the tank.

== Operational considerations ==
The LNWR quickly installed water troughs at other locations, but other companies were slow to adopt the new apparatus. The Great Western Railway (GWR) did so from 1895, and subsequently all the major railways in England, with the exception of the lines south of the River Thames, installed the equipment.

Taking water at speed results in considerable spray behind the scoop; this risks drenching passengers in the leading vehicles, and in Great Britain it was customary for the guard or other traincrew to warn passengers in the first coach to keep the windows closed. In one incident on the LMS railway in Britain, two streamlined trains with Coronation class locomotives happened to pass each other at a water trough when one of the trains was taking on water. The other train suffered broken windows due to lumps of tender coal scattered by the spray and the complaints from drenched passengers caused the management to retimetable the trains to ensure this could not happen again. Vaughan says that the Royal Train when conveying royalty was not permitted to be passed by another train in a section where there was a water trough.

Vaughan states that the GWR investigated the effectiveness of varying train speed, and found that 45 mph (72 km/h) was the optimum speed; but water could be picked up successfully as low as 15 mph (24 km/h). At that speed 944 imp gal (4,290 L) could be picked up in 440 yards (400 m), but Vaughan suggests that this is a low theoretical figure, and that it overlooks the bow wave effect which enables a greater take-up rate. There was a significant resistance to the forward motion of the engine during the process, enough to require special care by the driver to avoid problems on unfitted freight trains.

The considerable water spray made track maintenance difficult, and the physical trough equipment limited access for packing sleepers, exacerbating the problem. In very cold weather the water would freeze, preventing water pick-up, unless a heating apparatus was installed.

Track pans normally took a while to fill up after being used, so they could not be used immediately by a close-following train. They were also expensive to maintain, generally requiring a pumping station, a lot of plumbing, and an employee or two to maintain. They were thus only justified on a railroad with a high traffic volume. In the United States, several big eastern railroads used them, primarily the New York Central Railroad and Pennsylvania Railroad.

They could be found on all main lines in Britain, except on the Southern Railway. They were removed as use of steam trains decreased. When the Aber troughs were removed in 1967, the only remaining troughs were in north-west England and Scotland.

== Use by diesel locomotives ==
Diesel locomotives were introduced in the United Kingdom by British Railways in the 1950s, working alongside steam traction until 1968. Passenger vehicles were heated by steam from the locomotive boiler at that time, and the early diesel locomotives were provided with auxiliary boilers to provide the steam. Locomotives intended for long non-stop runs (such as the Class 40 and Class 55) were fitted with water scoops to allow them to replenish the steam generator's water supply from troughs. The withdrawal of steam traction and the introduction of rolling stock with electric rather than steam heating removed the need for such equipment on later types and scoop-equipped locomotives had their scoops removed.

== Locations ==
At its creation at the start of 1923, the London and North Eastern Railway (LNER) inherited ten sets of water troughs from its constituents, and also became a co-owner (with the Great Western Railway) of one more.

LNER water troughs
Location	Previous station	Next station	Milepost (origin)	Pre-group
Charwelton	Charwelton	Woodford and Hinton	135 (Manchester)	Great Central Railway
Eckington	Killamarsh	Eckington & Renishaw	51 (Manchester)	Great Central Railway
Halifax Junction	Bentley	Ipswich	67 (Liverpool Street)	Great Eastern Railway
Langley	Knebworth	Stevenage	26 (King's Cross)	Great Northern Railway
Lucker	Newham	Lucker	48 (Newcastle)	North Eastern Railway
Muskham	Newark	Carlton-on-Trent	123 (King's Cross)	Great Northern Railway
Ruislip	Ruislip & Ickenham	Denham	2 (Northolt Junction)	Great Western and Great Central Joint Railway
Scrooby	Scrooby	Bawtry	146 (King's Cross)	Great Northern Railway
Tivetshall	Burston	Tivetshall	100 (Liverpool Street)	Great Eastern Railway
Werrington	Peterborough	Tallington	80 (King's Cross)	Great Northern Railway
Wiske Moor	Northallerton	Danby Wiske	32 (York)	North Eastern Railway

A map showing the location of GWR troughs in the 1930s is reproduced in the book 'The Great Western Railway'. They are typically at spacings of 40 to 50 miles (64 to 80 km), but with some wide variations. There are a few instances of trough locations very close to major stopping points; for example Fox's Wood, near St Annes Park, two miles from Bristol Temple Meads; however this was installed when trains to South Wales travelled via Bath and Filton, using these troughs; after the opening of the South Wales direct route via Badminton, numerous passenger and goods trains continued to use the route and required the troughs. The lengths are also given: they vary from 524 to 620 yards (480 to 570 metres).

The locations were (in 1936):

Location	Milepost	In use from	Length
Pangbourne - Goring	43 1/2	1 October 1895	620 yd (570 m)
Aldermaston - Midgham	45 1/2	by 1904	620 yd (570 m)
Fairwood Junction (up)	111 1/2		553 yd (506 m)
Fairwood Junction (down)	111 3/4		495 yd (453 m)
Cogload Jn – Creech Jn	159 1/4	March 1902	560 yd (510 m)
Exminster – Starcross	200	July 1904	560 yd (510 m)
Keynsham – Fox's Wood	114 3/4	1 October 1895	620 yd (570 m)
Chipping Sodbury	104	1 January 1903	524 yd (479 m)
Undy – Magor	150 1/4		560 yd (510 m)
Ferryside	240 3/4		620 yd (570 m)
Denham – Ruislip	2 1/4	20 November 1905	560 yd (510 m)
Kings Sutton	81 1/2		560 yd (510 m)
Rowington Jn	114 1/2	by July 1902	440 yd (400 m) (560 yd (510 m) from 1908)
Charlbury	78		560 yd (510 m)
Bromfield – Ludlow	22 1/2		613 yd (561 m)
Lostwithiel			

Similar 1934 maps showed troughs on the main East, Midland and West Coast routes from London to Scotland:

London Kings Cross to Edinburgh Waverley
Location	Mileage apart	Length
Langley – Stevenage	27 mi (43 km)	694 yd (635 m)
Peterborough – Werrington Jn	52 mi (84 km)	638 yd (583 m)
Muskham	42 mi (68 km)	704 yd (644 m)
Scrooby – Bawtry	24 mi (39 km)	704 yd (644 m)
Northallerton – Danby Wiske	76 mi (122 km)	613 yd (561 m)
Lucker – Berwick	98 mi (158 km)	613 yd (561 m)
Edinburgh	73 mi (117 km)	

London Euston to Edinburgh and Glasgow
Location	Mileage apart	Length
Hatch End – Bushey	15 mi (24 km)	505 yd (462 m)
Wolverton – Castlethorpe	38 mi (61 km)	559 yd (511 m)
Rugby – Brinklow	32 mi (51 km)	554 yd (507 m)
Tamworth – Lichfield	28 mi (45 km)	642 yd (587 m)
Whitmore – Madeley	36 mi (58 km)	563 yd (515 m)
Preston Brook – Moore	29 mi (47 km)	579 yd (529 m)
Brock – Garstang	40 mi (64 km)	561 yd (513 m)
Hest Bank – Bolton-le-sands	18 mi (29 km)	562 yd (514 m)
Low Gill – Tebay	26 mi (42 km)	553 yd (506 m)
Floriston – Gretna	45 mi (72 km)	560 yd (510 m)
Thankerton – Carstairs	64 mi (103 km)	557 yd (509 m)
Glasgow	32 mi (51 km)	
Edinburgh	31 mi (50 km)	

London St Pancras to Glasgow
Location	Mileage apart	Length
Oakley – Sharnbrook	55 mi (89 km)	557 yd (509 m)
Loughborough – Hathern (via Leicester)	58 mi (93 km)	557 yd (509 m)
Melton Mowbray (via Nottingham)	45 mi (72 km)	557 yd (509 m)
Garsdale water troughs	144 mi (232 km)	554 yd (507 m)
Floriston – Gretna	45 mi (72 km)	560 yd (510 m)
Kirkconnel – New Cumnock	58 mi (93 km)	564 yd (516 m)
Glasgow	49 mi (79 km)	

Other British troughs are mentioned in articles on Ipswich and Tivetshall railway stations (Norfolk).

== Continuous water trough supply ==
The Railway Magazine writer, quoted above, contemplated nearly-continuous water troughs, avoiding the transport of large quantities of water in the train:

The question has been discussed as to whether it would be possible to have a continuous supply of water all along the lines, and so obviate the necessity for tenders. Some years ago a writer in the "Engineer" put it in this way; One ton of coal will last a heavy goods train 40 miles [64 km], and an express nearly 100 miles [160 km]; but from 6 to 8 or 9 tons of water are required for the same distance. If the tender were done away with, the coals, and a small tank with a capacity of forty or fifty gallons [180 or 230 L] to receive the water, and from which to supply the boiler, would have to be carried on the engine. After allowing for these, 15 or 20 tons of paying load might be added to the train, which would be an advantage additional to the primary object—the saving of time.

== Alternative techniques ==
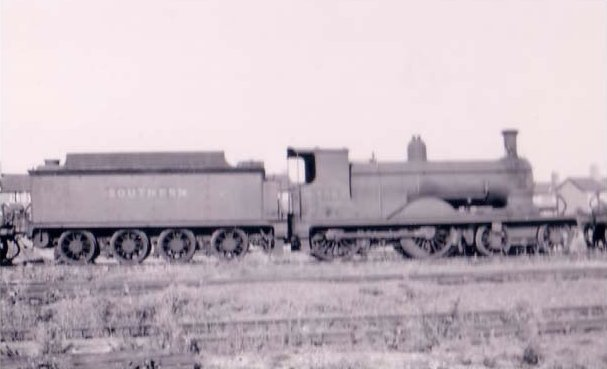
LSWR K10 class locomotive with "water cart" tender

Railway companies were well aware of the cost of installing and maintaining this equipment, and the provision of tenders with a large water capacity was an alternative employed in some cases. The London and South Western Railway in England used large 8-wheel tenders nicknamed "water carts".

== See also ==
- Water crane
