= Doncaster iPort =

Rail terminal in Doncaster, England

Coordinates: 53.47944°N 1.10476°W

Doncaster iPort or Doncaster Inland Port is an intermodal rail terminal; a Strategic Rail Freight Interchange, (Note: "Strategic Rail Freight Interchange"s (as identified by the UK's DfT) are large intermodal freight interchanges, serving large population centres, which were identified for governmental support as contributing in part to overall plans of increasing transport efficiency, and supporting development.) under construction in Rossington, Doncaster at junction 3 of the M18 motorway in England. It is to be connected to the rail network via the line of the former South Yorkshire Joint Railway, and from an extension of the former Rossington Colliery branch from the East Coast Main Line.

The development includes a 171-hectare (420-acre) intermodal rail terminal to be built on green belt land, of which over 50 hectares (120 acres) was to be developed into warehousing, making it the largest rail terminal in Yorkshire; the development also included over 150 hectares (370 acres) of countryside, the majority of which was to remain in agricultural use, with other parts used for landscaping, and habitat creation as part of environment mitigation measures.

== History ==
In 2006 developer HelioSlough began a public consultation around their proposals to create a rail freight depot west of Rossington.

In 2007 the Rossington Eco Town Partnership, an association of Rossington Forward, Rossington Development Trust, and local landowners and property developers UK Coal, Persimmon Homes, Helios Properties and Rossington Hall Limited presented plans to build a large 898-acre (363 ha) 'eco town' development over a 20-year timespan of ten to fifteen thousand homes on land to the south and west of Rossington. The plan included redevelopment of the Rossington Colliery site, and included as part of the employment proposals the plan from Helios Properties for an Inland port. The development, which would have used significant amounts of agricultural land was opposed by a large majority of local residents. The project was shortlisted as one of 15 potential sites in the UK for a new town development in 2008, by 2009 the scope of the plan had been reduced to a five thousand home 'eco-village'.

In 2009 developer HelioSlough submitted a planning application for a $516 million rail terminal with 6,000,000 sq ft (0.56 km^{2}) of warehousing; the plan represented the largest rail logistics development in Yorkshire, and was to be operated and part funded by Hutchinson Ports. The application, which included development on green belt land was approved by City of Doncaster Council but opposed by the Campaign to Protect Rural England, and four parish councils. In January 2010 local MPs Caroline Flint (Don Valley) and Jeffrey Ennis (Barnsley East and Mexborough) voiced their support for the plan. (Note: It was requested that the planning application was not delayed by being 'called in' for final planning approval to be made by the Secretary of State, but that the planning decision was left to local agencies (Doncaster Council); Department for Communities and Local Government minister Shahid Malik agreed the project was of strategic importance and promised to submit the proposal to the Secretary of State within three weeks of the Highways Agency completing analysis of road alterations relating to the development.) In March 2010 the UK government decided that no public enquiry would be needed for the project.

In June 2011 developers Helios Europe, Shepherd Aligned and Segro entered into a joint agreement to develop the site, which would be road connected via the £18 million Finningley and Rossington Regeneration Route Scheme (FARRRS) road scheme, (Note: Built to connect the A638/B6463 junction and the M18 motorway, giving Doncaster Sheffield Airport better motorway access.) and be built for international trade, with customs clearance. In September 2011 planning consent was given for the rail port; construction of the facility was initially planned to begin in 2012.

The tendering process for a rail operator of the port was begun in 2012: DB Schenker Rail UK, Associated British Ports, Stobart Group and Freightliner were listed as potential operators. Hutchinson Whampoa had also been reported as a potential rail operator in 2011.

In 2013 the successor company to Helios Europe, Verdion obtained financial backing for its projects through Healthcare of Ontario Pension Plan (HOOPP). HOOPP planned to invest €1 billion in European logistics facilities through Verdion including the £400 million "iPort Doncaster" development. Work on the FARRRS connecting road began in late 2013.

=== Site development plan ===
The railport lies directly adjacent to and south, west, and east of the M18 motorway, Rossington Colliery and spoil heaps, and former South Yorkshire Joint Railway respectively. Historically the land was entirely agricultural, known as Little Moor, and part of Potteric Carr; Potteric Carr farm was located in the northwestern portion of the site. The land is low lying, about 5m above sea level, and was drained by man made cuts. (Note: Drainage of the land was begun in the mid-1700s by engineer John Smeaton.) Potteric Carr Nature Reserve is to the north of the site.

The entire site covers 397.4 ha (982 acres), of which 171 ha (420 acres) is used for the development, 68.3 ha (169 acres) is access land, and 158.1 ha (391 acres) is countryside. Construction of the first phase was estimated to take 2 years including roads and rail access, 200,000 m^{2} (240,000 sq yd) of warehousing and rail terminal; with further warehousing constructed at a development rate of approximately 70,000 m^{2} (84,000 sq yd) per year; the entire project was estimated to be complete in 8 years.

The rail terminal is planned to connect to the rail network via both the single track freight only (since 1929) former South Yorkshire Joint Railway (SYJR) (northward and southward connections), and from an extension of the former Rossington Colliery branch off the East Coast Main Line. The terminal is to be built to handle containerised (ISO Container, Swap body), and wagon-load trains, with a capacity of 20 trains per day.

The connection from the SYJR would be the primary route to the facility, which would have 4 reception sidings and 5 handling sidings, as well as all distribution warehouses rail connected, with addition lines for damaged wagons, and locomotive storage. Gauging enhancements to loading gauge W10 are planned for connecting lines, with construction design allowing overhead electrification at a later date. The track plan allows train lengths of up to 775 metres (2,543 ft), with siding lengths between 589 and 775 metres (1,932 and 2,543 ft); trains over 450 metres (1,480 ft) would be handled by an on site shunter.

In addition to the rail terminal, track work, and road access further civil engineering works was required as part of the plan, mainly environmental mitigation, including diversion of St. Catherine's Well Stream, landscaping, flood mitigation and drainage, footpaths, cyclepaths and bridleways. Developer estimates of job creation were over 4,000 jobs net created on site as a direct result when fully operational.

=== Construction and development ===
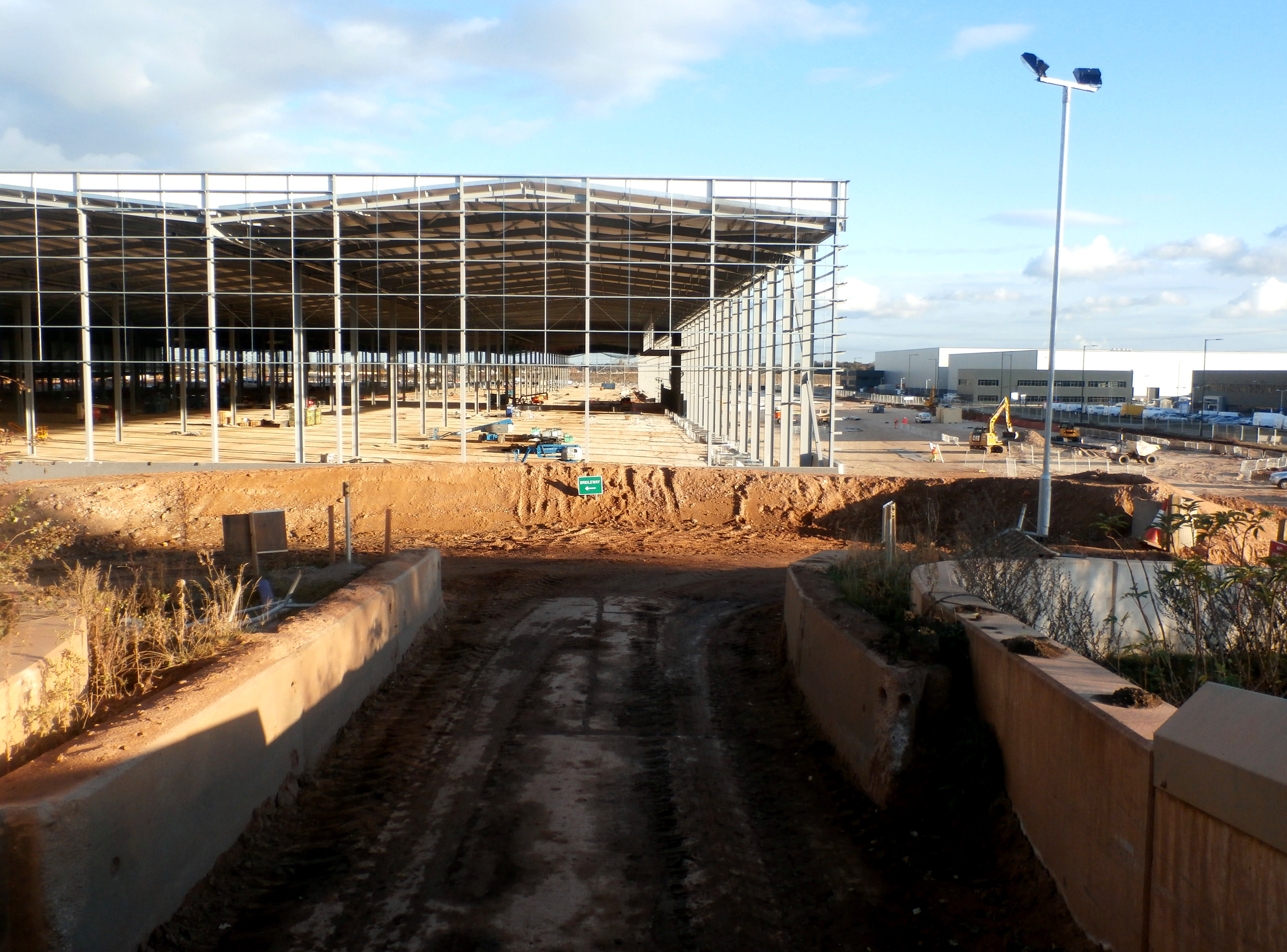
Construction work (2016)

Verdion began the construction of a c. 200,000-square-foot (19,000 m^{2}) and a 120,000-square-foot (11,000 m^{2}) warehousing unit in May 2015; erection of the warehousing's frames began in November 2015.

In April 2016 Fellowes acquired a 144,373-square-foot (13,412.7 m^{2}) warehouse space, also to function as the company's new UK headquarters.

After some testing in late 2017, the site officially opened to railway traffic in February 2018, however, regular freight trains did not start until 12 September 2018 when Princess Anne officially unveiled the new terminal. A week later, container trains from Southampton were arriving at the site at a rate of one per day site. From April 2019, the iPort is also served by two trains daily from Teesport. The terminal is also now served by two trains daily to and from the Port of Felixstowe. All of these trains are operated by GB Railfreight.

== See also ==
- Strategic rail freight interchange
