= Bentley Crossing Halt railway station =

Disused railway station in South Yorkshire, England

Bentley Crossing Halt

General information
- Location: Bentley, Metropolitan Borough of Doncaster; England
- Coordinates: 53.54258°N 1.14965°W
- Grid reference: SE564054
- Platforms: 2

Other information
- Status: Disused

History
- Original company: West Riding and Grimsby Railway
- Pre-grouping: West Riding and Grimsby Railway
- Post-grouping: London and North Eastern Railway

Key dates
- 1914: opened
- 1943: closed
Location

Bentley Crossing Halt was a small railway station on the West Riding and Grimsby Railway line between Doncaster and Carcroft & Adwick-le-Street. It was a workman's halt built in 1914 to serve the community of Bentley, near Doncaster, South Yorkshire, England at the point where the main line crosses the road through the village on the level. The road links Bentley with York Bar. The station consisted of wooden platforms with wooden buildings to act as waiting shelter and office.

The station was closed around 1943 and little can now be seen of the buildings (a regular fault with wooden built stations), however the Bentley (South Yorkshire) railway station was built on the same site.
