= A6182 road =

Road in South Yorkshire, England

Coordinates: 53.5061°N 1.1164°W

A6182

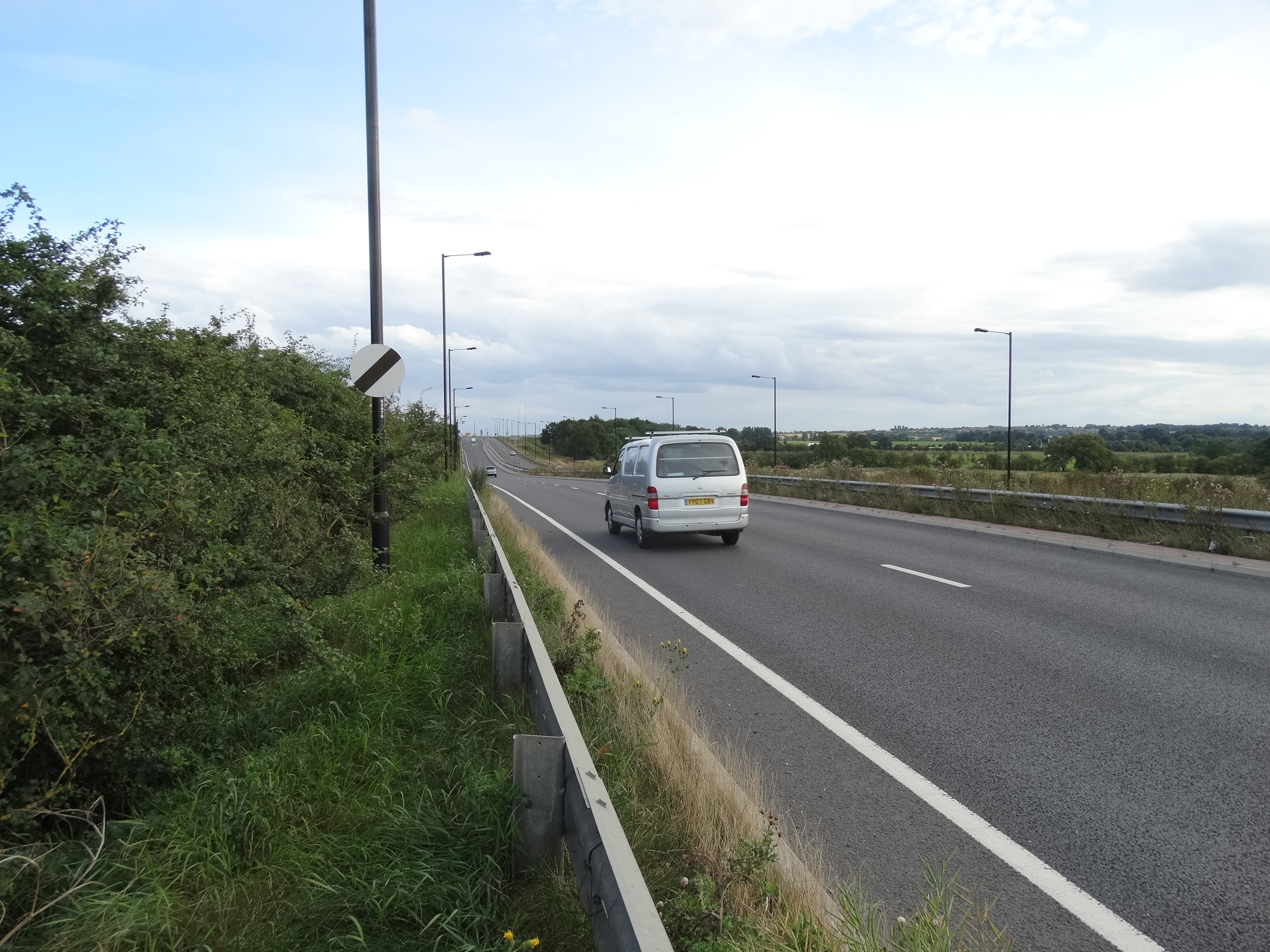
- White Rose Way towards Doncaster

Route information
- Length: 4.9 mi (7.9 km)

Major junctions
- South end: Doncaster Sheffield Airport
- A638 M18; A18 A638
- North end: Hyde Park, Doncaster

Location
- Country: United Kingdom
- Primary destinations: Rossington, Doncaster

Road network
- Roads in the United Kingdom; Motorways; A and B road zones

The A6182 is a dual carriageway in Doncaster that runs west and north from the former Doncaster Sheffield Airport to junction 3 of the M18 and then on to Hyde Park, an inner suburb of Doncaster.

The road is named "White Rose Way" north of the M18, and "Great Yorkshire Way" south of the M18.

The road's purpose is to link the city centre with the M18, from which drivers can reach the A1 and M1, and the now-closed Doncaster Sheffield Airport.

== 21st century extensions ==
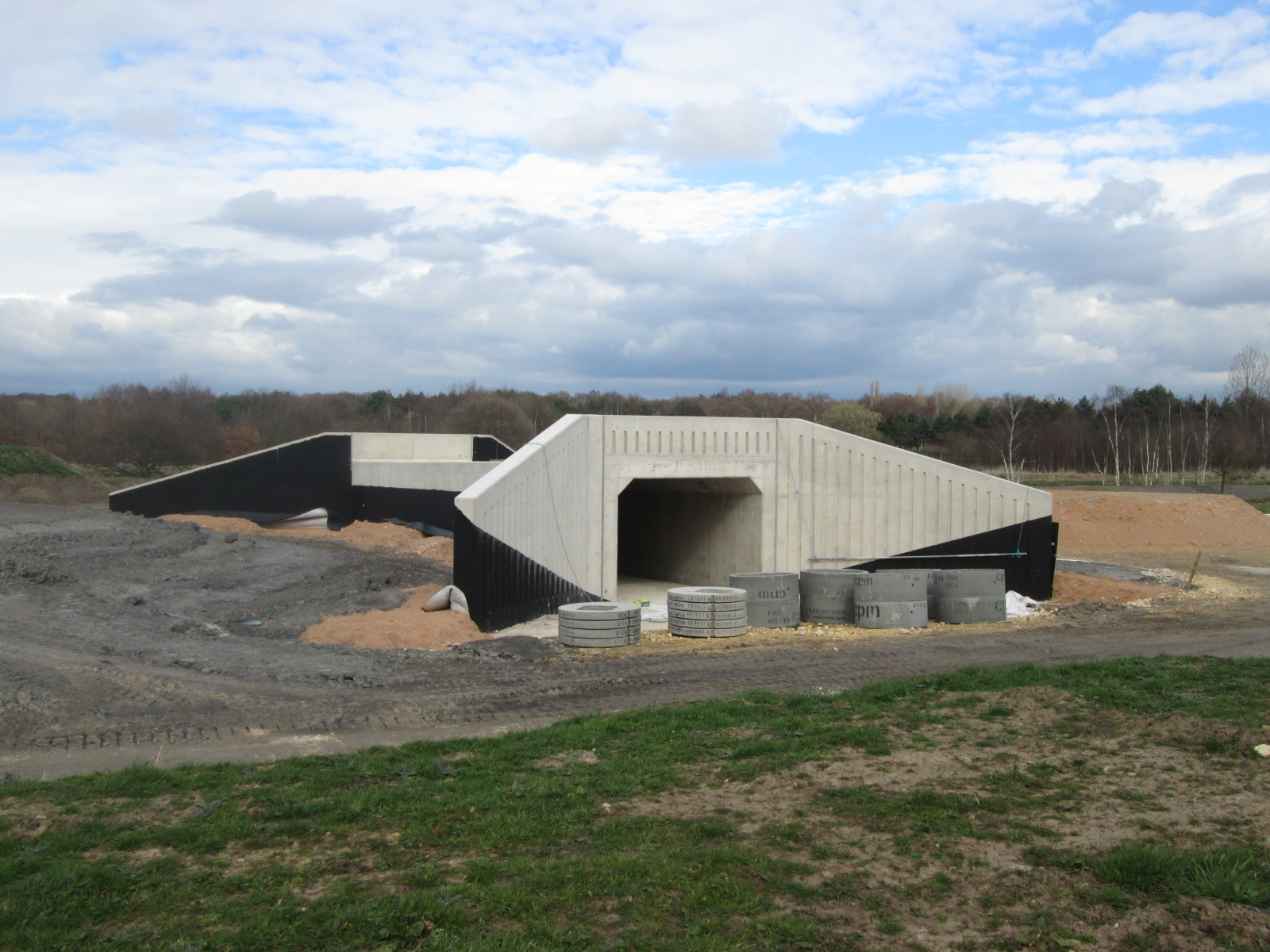
Underpass for the new road near Rossington under construction (2015)

The upgrade of the part of the road from Lakeside Village Outlet to the M18 to dual carriageway was completed in June 2013.

=== Great Yorkshire Way ===
The Great Yorkshire Way (formerly Finningley and Rossington Regeneration Route Scheme (FARRRS)) is a new road scheme running between the M18 at Junction 3 and Doncaster Sheffield Airport, improving access primarily to the airport, Rossington and the new Doncaster iPort. Work started in 2013 and the first phase of the road between M18 junction 3 and the A638 road became operational in February 2016. Work on the second and final phase connecting the A638 and the airport began in June 2017 and was completed in June 2018.

== Industrial estates ==
Due to the nature of the road, a large number of industrial estates line the A6182, as well as the Lakeside Village and the main Royal Mail sorting office for Doncaster and most of East Yorkshire. British Telecom, Royal Bank of Scotland, Tesco Insurance and Direct Line possess large call centres situated just off the road. There is a new iPort near Rossington.
