= Scrooby railway station =

Former railway station in Nottinghamshire, England

Coordinates: 53.4096°N 1.0156°W

Scrooby
- This picture was taken in July, 1979. The station house has since been renovated.

General information
- Location: Scrooby, Bassetlaw; England
- Platforms: 2

Other information
- Status: Disused

History
- Opened: 4 September 1849
- Closed: 1938; 88 years ago
- Original company: Great Northern Railway
- Post-grouping: London and North Eastern Railway

Key dates
- 14 September 1931; 94 years ago: Closed to Regular services
Location

Scrooby was a railway station on the Great Northern Railway running between Retford and Doncaster. The station served the small village of Scrooby until closed in 1931, though an excursion stopped in 1938. Sunday trains ended in 1924. In 1897 it had a booking office, waiting room, stationmaster's house, signal box and 5 passenger trains a day each way, but no goods facilities. About 1978 the signal box was replaced by Doncaster power box.

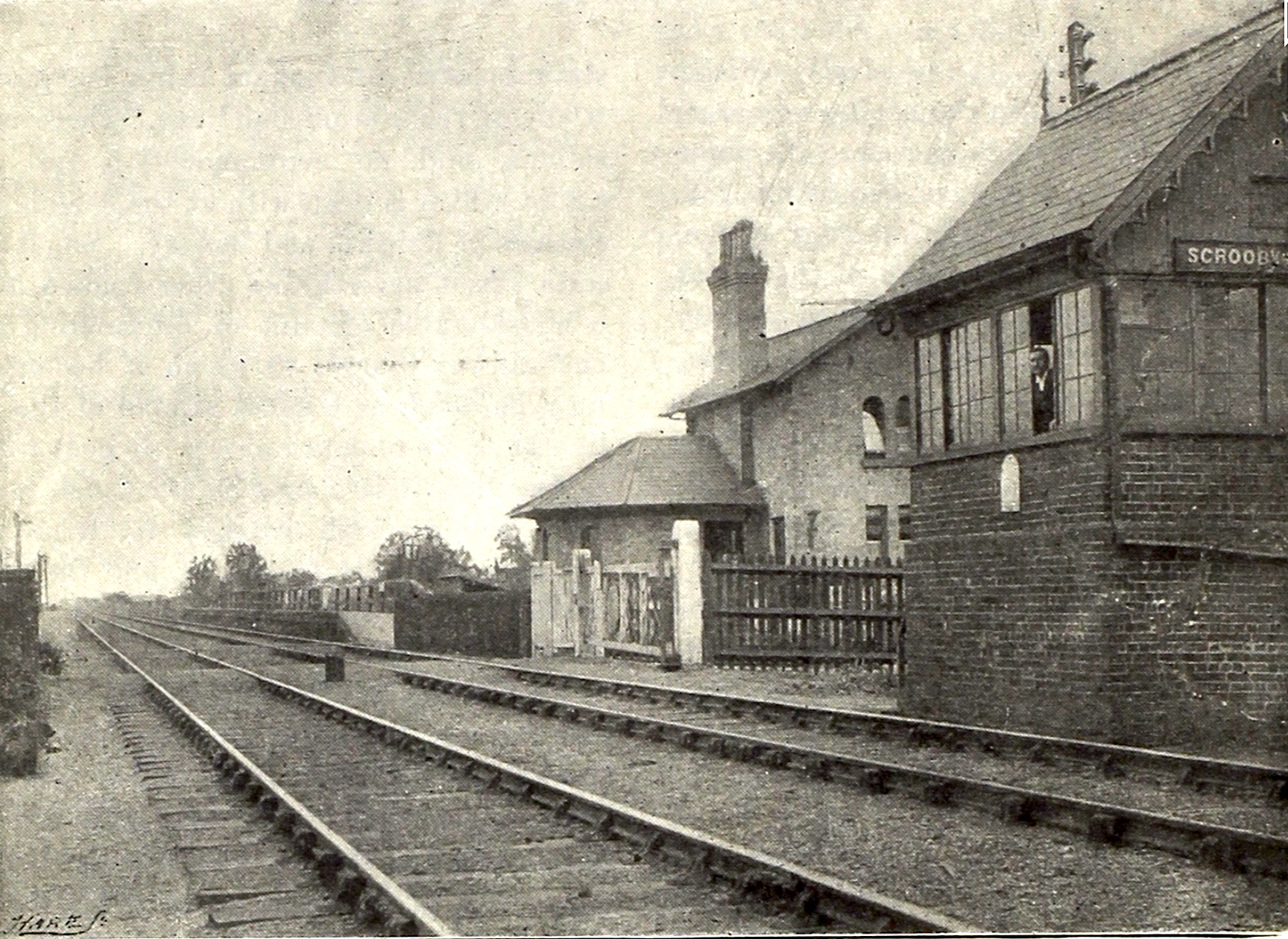
Station and signalbox in 1897

The area was also famous for the water troughs on the line from about 1903 to about 1969.

== Present day ==
The station survives today as a private house.

Preceding station	Disused railways	Following station
Bawtry	London and North Eastern Railway; Retford to Doncaster	Ranskill
