= Barnby Moor and Sutton railway station =

Former railway station in Nottinghamshire, England

Barnby Moor and Sutton

General information
- Location: Barnby Moor, Nottinghamshire; England
- Coordinates: 53.3525°N 0.9894°W
- Grid reference: SK673844
- Platforms: 2

Other information
- Status: Disused

History
- Original company: Great Northern Railway
- Pre-grouping: Great Northern Railway
- Post-grouping: LNER

Key dates
- July 1850: Opened as Sutton and Barnby Moor
- September 1850: Name changed to Sutton
- 16 November 1909: Name changed to Barnby Moor and Sutton
- 7 November 1949: Closed
Location

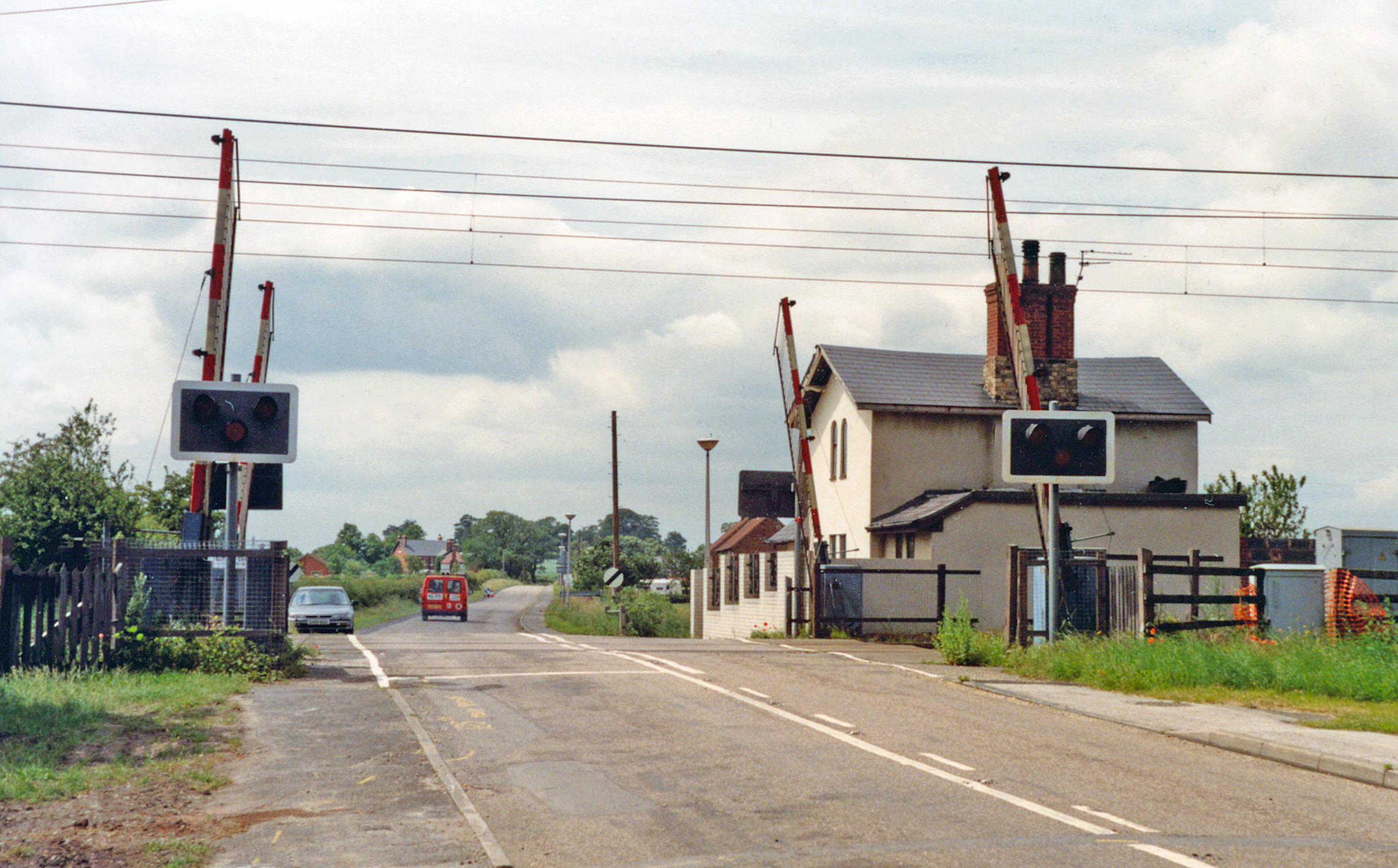
Site of Barney Moor & Sutton station -1992

Barnby Moor and Sutton railway station served the village of Barnby Moor and Sutton cum Lound, Nottinghamshire, England from 1850 to 1949 on the East Coast Main Line.

== History ==
The station opened as Sutton and Barnby Moor in July 1850 by the Great Northern Railway. The station's name was changed to Sutton in September 1850 and changed again to Barnby Moor and Sutton on 16 November 1909. The station closed to both passengers and freight traffic on 7 November 1949.

Preceding station	Disused railways	Following station
Ranskill; Line open, station closed	Great Northern Railway; East Coast Main Line	Retford; Line and station open
