= Bentley railway station (South Yorkshire) =

Railway station in South Yorkshire, England

Bentley (South Yorkshire)
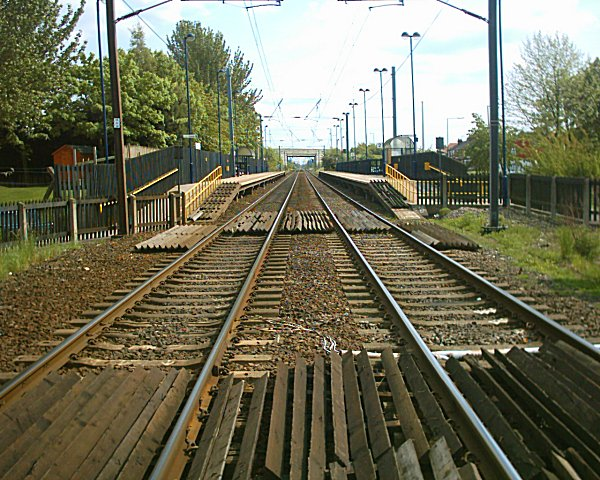
- Bentley Station in early 2005

General information
- Location: Bentley, Metropolitan Borough of Doncaster; England
- Coordinates: 53.5440°N 1.1510°W
- Grid reference: SE563055
- Manager: Northern Trains
- Transit authority: South Yorkshire Passenger Transport Executive
- Platforms: 2

Other information
- Station code: BYK
- Fare zone: Doncaster
- Classification: DfT category F1

History
- Original company: British Rail

Key dates
- 27 April 1992: Station opened

Passengers
- 2020/21: ▼23,024
- 2021/22: ▲94,042
- 2022/23: ▲112,702
- 2023/24: ▲0.133 million
- 2024/25: ▲0.158 million
Location
Notes
- Passenger statistics from the Office of Rail and Road

Bentley railway station is a railway station that serves Bentley, South Yorkshire, England. It lies on the Wakefield Line and is managed by Northern Trains, who also provide all the passenger trains serving it. It was opened on 27 April 1992 by British Rail with financial assistance from the South Yorkshire Passenger Transport Executive. An earlier wooden halt, Bentley Crossing, built by the West Riding and Grimsby Railway, had previously existed at the same location but was closed by 1943.

A common complaint is the lack of a footbridge between the two platforms. Passengers have to cross through the road barrier to get from one side to the other; therefore they may have to wait until trains have passed, and could miss their trains. The Wakefield Line is busy with London North Eastern Railway services and freight services as well as the Northern operations.

Bentley is a popular commuting station for Leeds and Wakefield. It has a large car park for the size of the station and as such is a good station for Park and Ride to Doncaster. Adwick station is also a dedicated park and ride station for Doncaster.

== Facilities ==
The station is unstaffed and has recently (April 2018) been equipped with a ticket vending machine at the entrance to the car park adjacent to the north-bound platform 2. This machine however only accepts card payments so also issues promise-to-pay notices for exchange on the train, as well as advertising the availability of e-ticketing via the Northern mobile app. There are waiting shelters, digital CIS displays and timetable poster boards on both platforms; train running information is also available by telephone. Step-free access is available to both platforms via the level crossing.

== Services ==
There are two trains per hour in each direction from the station on weekdays, southbound to Doncaster and northbound to Adwick. One southbound service continues to Meadowhall and Sheffield (Mon – Sat daytimes only), whilst one per hour northbound runs to Wakefield Westgate and Leeds.

Sundays see a two-hourly service each way to Doncaster and Leeds.

Preceding station	National Rail	Following station
Doncaster	Northern Trains Wakefield Line	Adwick
