= Lucker railway station =

Disused railway station in Northumberland, England

Lucker
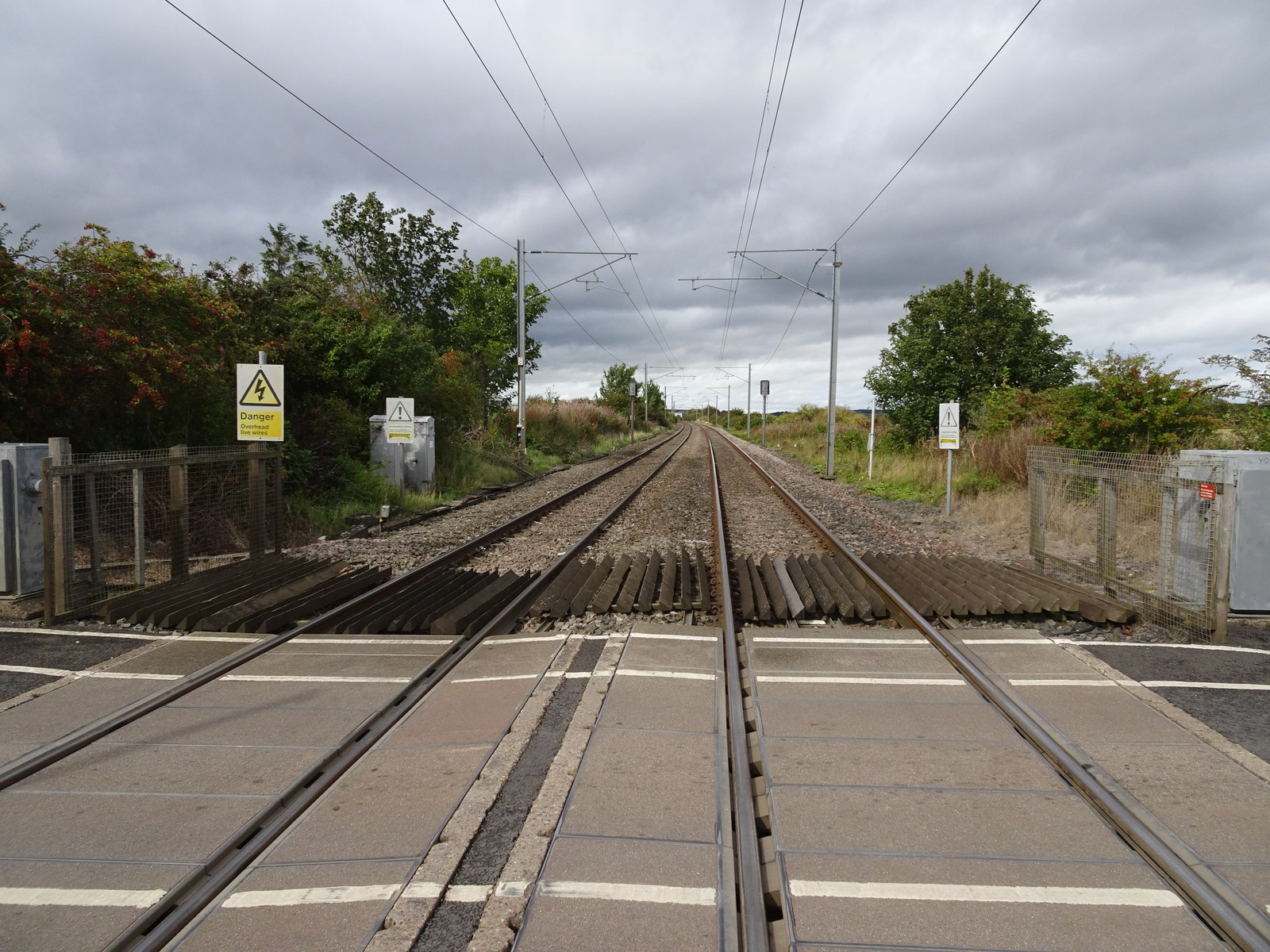
- The site of the station, looking northwest towards Belford, in 2018

General information
- Location: Lucker, Northumberland; England
- Coordinates: 55.5724°N 1.7589°W
- Grid reference: NU153310
- Platforms: 2

Other information
- Status: Disused

History
- Original company: York, Newcastle and Berwick Railway
- Pre-grouping: North Eastern Railway
- Post-grouping: LNER; British Railways (North Eastern)

Key dates
- 29 March 1847: Opened
- 5 May 1941: Closed to passengers
- 7 October 1946: Reopened
- 2 February 1953: Closed to passengers again
- 7 June 1965: Closed completely
Location

Lucker railway station served the village of Lucker, Northumberland, England, from 1847 to 1965 on the East Coast Main Line.

== History ==
The station opened on 29 March 1847 by the York, Newcastle and Berwick Railway. The station was situated north of the level crossing on the B1341 road. On the down side of the station, there were four sidings, two of which led to the coal depot. There was also a goods loading bank, but no goods depot. Lucker station was one to close during the Second World War, closing on 5 May 1941. It reopened on 7 October 1946 but the number of tickets sold was very low, (an average of 277 per year, which is around one a day) so closure hardly caused any inconvenience. The station closed for passengers in 1953 and completely on 7 June 1965.

To the south of the station, at milepost 48 (measured from Newcastle), were Lucker water troughs. These were the first on the NER system, and were brought into use on 1 March 1898, in order that trains could run non-stop between Newcastle and Edinburgh; trains which called at Berwick took water there.

Preceding station	Historical railways	Following station
Newham; Line open, station closed	York, Newcastle and Berwick Railway; East Coast Main Line	Belford (Northumberland); Line open, station closed
