= Listed buildings in Rossington =

Rossington is a civil parish in the metropolitan borough of Doncaster, South Yorkshire, England. The parish contains ten listed buildings that are recorded in the National Heritage List for England. Of these, one is listed at Grade II*, the middle of the three grades, and the others are at Grade II, the lowest grade. The parish contains the village of Rossington and the surrounding area. The listed buildings include houses and associated structures, two churches, a milepost, a shop, a well house, and a war memorial.

== Key ==
Grade	Criteria
II*	Particularly important buildings of more than special interest
II	Buildings of national importance and special interest

== Buildings ==
Name and location	Photograph	Date	Notes	Grade
St Michael's Church; 53.47862°N 1.05963°W		12th century	When the church was largely rebuilt in 1841–44, some Norman features, and the 14th-century Perpendicular tower, were retained. The church is built in magnesian limestone and sandstone with slate roofs. It has a cruciform plan, consisting of a nave, a south porch, north and south transepts, a chancel, a north vestry under a separate roof, and a west tower. The tower has four stages, diagonal buttresses, a small west doorway with a moulded surround and a hood mould, a three-light west window with a similar surround, clock faces, two-light bell openings, north and south gargoyles, and an embattled parapet with eight crocketed pinnacles. The gabled porch contains a Norman doorway with two orders and beakheads in the arch.	II*
Rossington Bridge House, wall and railings 53.48872°N 1.05232°W		Mid 18th century	A coaching inn later used for other purposes, it is in red brick with stone slate eaves courses, and has a roof of pantile and Welsh slate with coped gables and shaped kneelers. There are two storeys, a main block of three bays, a lower single-bay extension on the left with a rear outshut, and a lower two-bay extension on the right with a rear wing. In the centre of the main block is a wooden Doric porch with triglyphs and a cornice, and this is flanked by canted bay windows. The right extension contains a doorway with a fanlight, to the right is a bay window, and the other windows in the building are sashes. In front are low brick walls with stone copings and cast iron railings with arrow-head finials.	II
Shahjamal; 53.47871°N 1.06101°W	—	1801	A school converted into a rectory in 1804, and later a private house, it is in stuccoed brick on a plinth, with a hipped Welsh slate roof. There are two storeys and fronts of five bays. In the entrance front the middle three bays project under a pediment, and have a central two-storey round-arched recess containing a doorway with an architrave, a fanlight, and a cornice on consoles, above which is a window with an architrave. To the right is a French window, and the other windows are sashes. At the rear is a canted bay window to the right, and a pediment over the middle three bays.	II
National Horseracing College; 53.46326°N 1.03933°W		1855	The former stable block to Rossington Hall, it is in red brick with roofs of Welsh slate and green slate, and has an irregular D-shaped plan. At the entrance is a carriage arch with a moulded surround, above which is a gabled tower containing a clock face. On the ridge is a wooden bell turret with a lead-roofed ogee cupola and a weathervane. To the right is a stair turret with slit windows and an octagonal spirelet, and these are flanked by ranges of one and two storeys. Behind is a courtyard enclosed by a semicircular range with one storey and an attic, containing doorways with fanlights and sash windows, and with twelve dormers in the roof.	II
Milepost; 53.48127°N 1.04434°W		1858	The milepost is on the east side of the Great North Road (A638 road). It is in cast iron, and has a triangular plan and two round-headed angled panels. Raised letters indicate the distances to London, York, Bawtry and Doncaster, and in the lower part are details of the maker.	II
Garage shop 53.47882°N 1.06313°W	—	1859	A building in High Victorian style used for various purposes, it is built in painted brick with buttresses, and a hipped blue tile roof. There is a single storey and a single bay. On the front is a canopy on wooden braces, above the doorway and windows is a wrought iron grill, and in the roof is a blind dormer. In the left return is a doorway and a window, both with pointed heads.	II
Village pump 53.47861°N 1.06263°W		1859–1861	A well house in magnesian limestone, with a square base, and an octagonal turret and a spirelet. On the base are miniature buttresses, and the sides are pierced with quatrefoils. On the spirelet are lucarnes with trefoils, and a crocketed finial.	II
Rossington Hall and wall 53.46280°N 1.04054°W		1882	A large house later used for other purposes, it is in red brick with moulded stone dressings on a plinth, with string courses, pierced parapets with urns, and a hipped Welsh slate roof with shaped gables. It is in Jacobethan style, and has three storeys and attics, and fronts of five bays, the middle and outer bays projecting. In the fourth bay is a round-arched entrance flanked by pilasters, and above is a pedimented plaque. To the right of the house is a quadrant wall enclosing a garden.	II
St Luke's Church; 53.47615°N 1.08003°W		1915–16	The church is in red brick with stone dressings, the apse roofs are in red tile, and the rest of the church has a slate roof. It consists of a nave and chancel with a clerestory, a west porch, a north vestry, and an apse at each end, the west apse containing a baptistry and the east end the sanctuary.	II
War memorial 53.47900°N 1.05927°W	—	1944	The war memorial is in an enclosure in the churchyard of St Michael's Church. It is in granite, and consists of a rough-hewn Greek cross, with a tapering shaft on a tapering rectangular pedestal. This is on a brick plinth capped with a concrete slab. On the pedestal is a recessed inscribed plaque, and on the plinth is a brass tablet with an inscription and the names of those lost in the two World Wars.	II
