= Rossington =

Civil parish and former mining village in South Yorkshire, England

Coordinates: 53.47594°N 1.06130°W

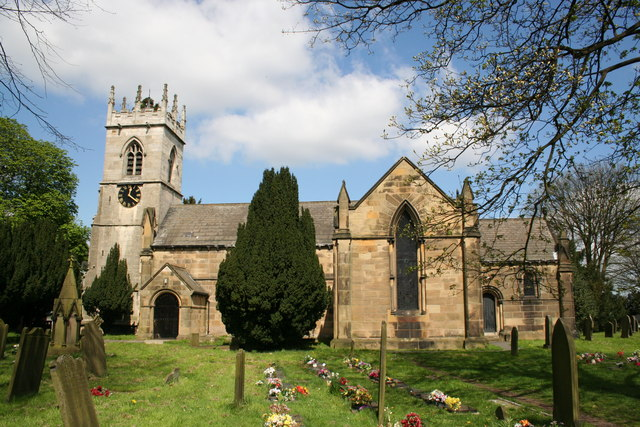
- St Michael's Church

- Shown within the Borough of Doncaster Location within South Yorkshire
- Population: 13,557 (2011 census)
- OS grid reference: SK624981
- Civil parish: Rossington
- Metropolitan borough: Doncaster
- Metropolitan county: South Yorkshire
- Region: Yorkshire and the Humber
- Country: England
- Sovereign state: United Kingdom
- Post town: DONCASTER
- Postcode district: DN11
- Dialling code: 01302
- Police: South Yorkshire
- Fire: South Yorkshire
- Ambulance: Yorkshire
- UK Parliament: Doncaster East and the Isle of Axholme

Rossington is a civil parish and former mining village in the City of Doncaster, South Yorkshire, England and is surrounded by countryside and the market towns of Bawtry and Tickhill.

== Geography ==
Historically part of the West Riding of Yorkshire, it has a population of 13,255, increasing to 13,557 at the 2011 Census. Robin Hood Airport Doncaster Sheffield is around two miles to the east. The village is demarcated to the north and west by a line of 400 kV pylons, as seen from the M18, to the north. The Finningley and Rossington Relief Road Scheme – from Junction 3 of the M18 to Parrot's Corner (junction of the A638 and the B6463 roads) – is proposed to allow access to the airport. Construction was due to start in late summer 2012 though initial site clearance work only commenced in early 2013.

To the north-west, the village borders Loversall, with the boundary following the River Torne, passing directly next to the western edge of the former Rossington Main Colliery. It briefly crosses the M18 at the point where the motorway crosses the East Coast Main Line. At this point it meets the Borough of Doncaster and follows Mother Drain, then the River Torne, north of Torne Valley Farm. It passes by a Roman fort and crosses the A638 at Rossington Bridge, north of Rossington Bridge Farm. At Wheatcroft Farm it meets Finningley. Nearby at the junction of the A638 and B6463, there is a park and ride car park. The boundary passes along the west of Hurst Plantation, and meets the A638, a former Roman road, at Warren House Farm. Following the A638 at Mount Pleasant Hotel, it meets Austerfield. In the south-east of the parish is the Northern Racing College (for horse racing), next to Rossington Hall School. At Bawtry Forest, it meets Bawtry. Crossing the B6463 at New England Cottages, it meets Tickhill. At Stancil Bridge, it meets the River Torne and Wadworth.

=== Places of worship ===
The village has a number of churches of different denominations: St. Michael's Church (Rossington Parish Church); St. Lukes's Church (New Rossington Parish Church); Rossington Methodist Church; Christ the King Roman Catholic Church; New Life Christian Centre; and Rossington Community Baptist Church at Holmescarr Community Centre

=== Education ===
The village has several schools, including: St. Michael's CE Primary School; St. Joseph's RC Primary School; Tornedale Infant School; Pheasant Bank Junior School; Grange Lane Infant School; and Rossington All Saints Academy. Rossington Hall, which became a boarding school for "educationally subnormal" children in 1953, closed in 2008. Former councillor and Labour Party politician Caroline Flint owned 77 acres on the 3,000 acre Rossington Hall site in 2008.

== History ==
There are remains of both a Roman fort and Roman pottery kilns in the area. The name Rossington translates from the old Anglo-Saxon name of 'Farm on the Moor'. In later times, Rossington housed a small village and both Rossington Hall and Shooters Hill Hall. Until the reign of Henry VII, the Rossington area was in Nottinghamshire as the River Torne was part of the boundary between Yorkshire and Nottinghamshire.

=== New Rossington, (Old) Rossington, Littleworth, Hesley, Rossington Bridge and Shooters Hill ===
The area known as "Rossington" is made up of a number of villages and hamlets, namely "Hesley", "Littleworth", "Rossington", "New Rossington", Rossington Bridge and Shooters Hill. The village of Littleworth was mentioned in the Doomsday book and was enlarged to a great degree in the 1970s, when Littleworth Park Estate was built. Doncaster city council removed the "Littleworth" sign at the junction of Littleworth Lane and Station Road in the late 1990s for renovation. The new village began to be built around the time of the sinking of the colliery. Rossington Bridge, although now only consisting of a few buildings is the oldest of the six settlements; situated on the crossing of the Roman road from Lincoln (Lindvm) to York (Ebvrscvm) via Doncaster (Danum) it was once the site of a major Roman fort (the largest between Lincoln and York). Rossington Bridge was also an important staging post on the Great North Road.

After the colliery closed, Rossington saw the building of large levels of new, private housing, particularly around the "Old Village", raising the village's affluence. Locally, the village is known as "Old Village" and "New Village" but local estate agents use the term "Old Rossington" when actually referring to The Original village of Rossington.

=== Colliery ===
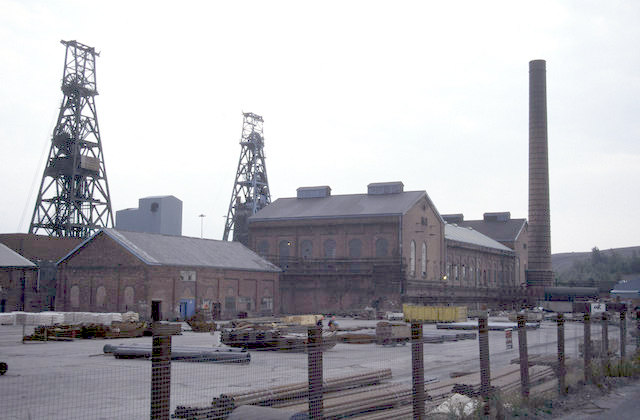
Rossington Main Colliery

It was, however, in the mid-20th century that saw the largest expansion of the area. The pit was sunk between 1912 and 1915. The need for workers in and around the Rossington Main Colliery led to the building of large numbers of houses near to the pit in what was called New Rossington. After the end of British Coal in the early 1990s, the mine was able to keep operating and became one of the last in the area to keep producing coal albeit at a greatly reduced scale. However, with the decline of the mine, the village suffered high levels of unemployment and poverty throughout the 1990s and early 2000s. The colliery closed briefly between 1993 and 1994 before finally closing in 2007. In 2012 a coal reclamation project started on the Rossington Colliery spoil tip, this was expected to take up to 5 years to complete.

In September 2012 planning permission was given by the borough council to build a £100 million, 1,200 home, housing development including a primary school and hotel on the colliery site. Construction of houses on the site began in May 2015.

=== Rail transport ===
The 'Old Village' and 'New Village' are separated by the East Coast Main Line. There are only two crossing points over the railway between the old and new villages: the road bridge on Stripe Road and the level crossing where West End Lane becomes Station Road. Rossington railway station was closed for regular services in 1958 but a few special trains stopped there until the late 1960s. The station buildings and platforms remained in place until the early 1980s, when the platforms, to the south of the level crossing, were dug up, and the old signal box that stood on the north east side of the crossing was demolished. A few years earlier, the signalling had been automated, and control of the crossing had moved to Doncaster PSB. When the old signal box was in operation, the crossing was controlled by a large set of wooden gates, which were operated by the signalman who had to leave the signal box and open and close the gates by hand. By the mid-1950s, these gates were opened and closed by a large wheel in the signal box. These gates were replaced by automated barriers controlled from Doncaster PSB at the same time as the signal box was closed; however, some older residents of Rossington still refer to the crossing gates. The only surviving building is the old station cottages, which stand on the north west side of the crossing and are now private dwellings.

==== Rail Port ====
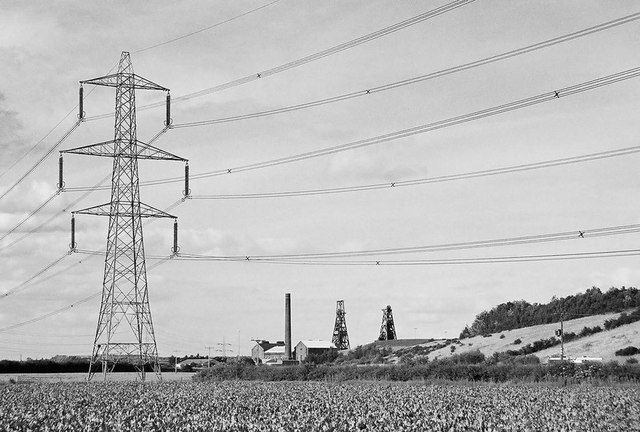
View of the colliery from Wadworth Carr, to the west of the village, and location of Doncaster iPort

In the first decade of the 21st century a plan was proposed for an 'eco town' of over ten thousand homes, to the southwest of Rossington, the plan was opposed by the majority of Rossington residents, and was reduced in scope by the end of the decade; a related industrial development proposed as part of the plan was a large scale intermodal rail terminal which received wider support and was given planning consent in 2011 with construction expected to take place over two years starting 2012, with continued development over eight years. The rail terminal is to be built west of the Rossington Colliery site.

=== Sport ===
Rossington Main Football Club was formed in 1919 as Rossington Colliery, originally playing behind the colliery offices in New Rossington, before moving to their current home at the end of Oxford Street in 1921. In 1998 the club merged with the latterly formed Rossington F.C. (formerly Station F.C.), and the new Rossington Main F.C. currently play in the Northern Counties East League.

Rossington is the home to the 'RASCALS' swimming team based at Rossington Sports Centre. Rossington Swimming Club was founded in June 1966.

Rossington has a long history of local junior and senior cricket. Rossington Main Cricket Club has three senior teams which mix youth and experience; these teams play on a Saturday and Sunday. The cricket club also has junior teams from the under 11s, under 13s, under 15s and under 17s.

== Twinned Towns ==
Rossington is twinned with McCleary in Washington State, United States.

== Notable people ==
- Don Concannon, Labour MP from 1966 to 1987 for Mansfield (another area with coal mining heritage)
- Sir Patrick Duffy, former Labour MP for Colne Valley and Sheffield Attercliffe, grew up in Rossington
- Ernest Jones CBE, President from 1954 to 1960 of the NUM, worked at Rossington Main Colliery from 1918 to 1921
- Jack Teasdale, footballer for Doncaster Rovers from 1949 to 1956.

== Gallery ==
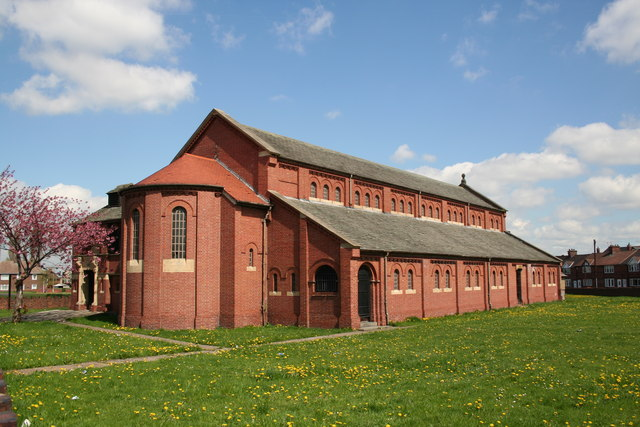
St Luke's Church, New Rossington

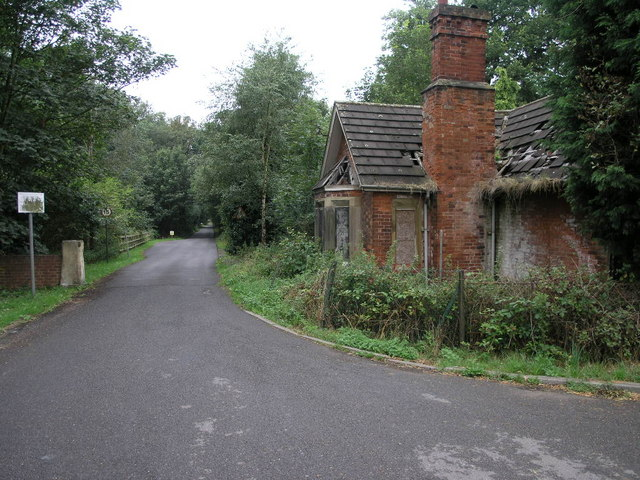
Entrance to Rossington Hall (former school)

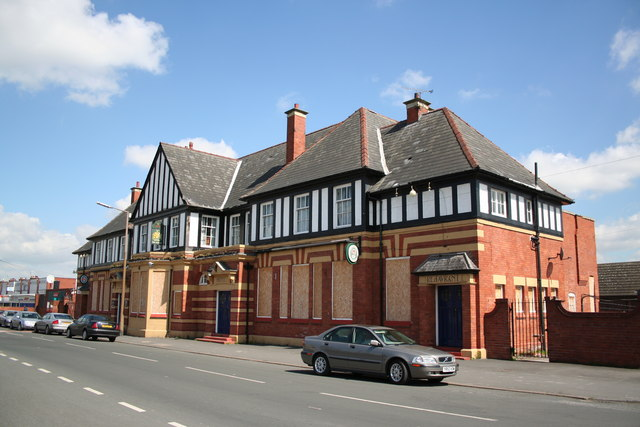
Royal Hotel (now demolished)

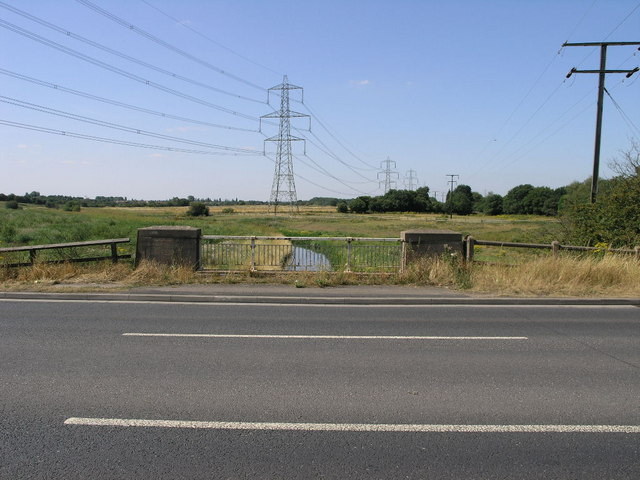
Rossington Bridge, on the former Great North Road (A638)

== See also ==
- Listed buildings in Rossington
