= Ranskill railway station =

Former railway station in Nottinghamshire, England

Ranskill
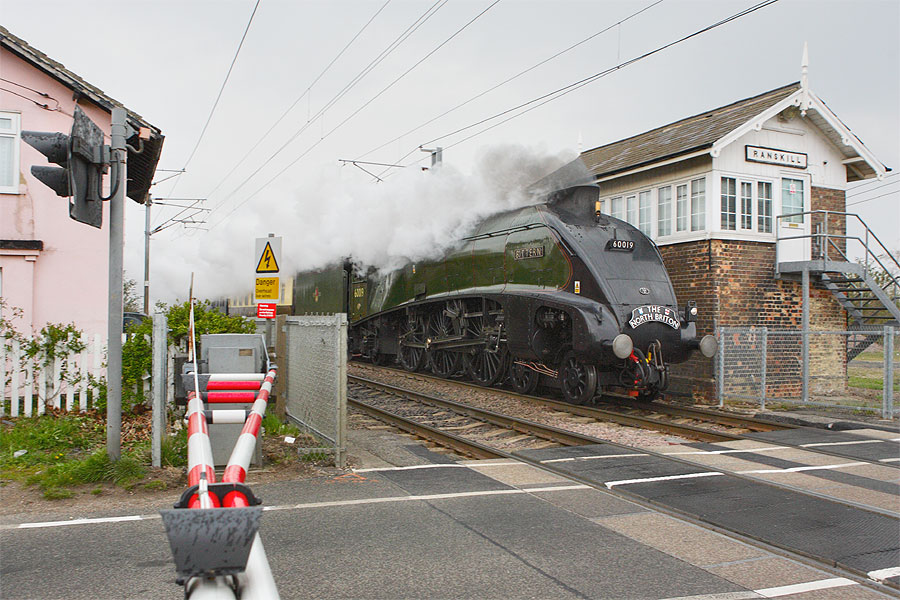
- LNER 60019 passing through the site of the station in 2008

General information
- Location: Nottinghamshire; England
- Coordinates: 53.3828°N 1.0068°W
- Grid reference: SK661877
- Platforms: 2

Other information
- Status: Disused

History
- Original company: Great Northern Railway
- Pre-grouping: Great Northern Railway
- Post-grouping: London and North Eastern Railway

Key dates
- 4 September 1849: Opened
- 6 October 1958: Closed to passengers
- 7 December 1964: Closed completely
Location

Ranskill railway station served the village of Ranskill, Nottinghamshire, England from 1849 to 1964 on the East Coast Main Line.

== History ==
The station opened on 4 September 1849 by the Great Northern Railway. During the Second World War, there was a Royal Ordnance Factory located on the up side with its own factory station. The station was closed to passengers on 6 October 1958 and was closed completely on 7 December 1964.

Preceding station	Disused railways	Following station
Scrooby; Line open, station closed	Great Northern Railway; East Coast Main Line	Barnby Moor and Sutton; Line open, station closed
