= Rossington railway station =

Former railway station in England

Rossington
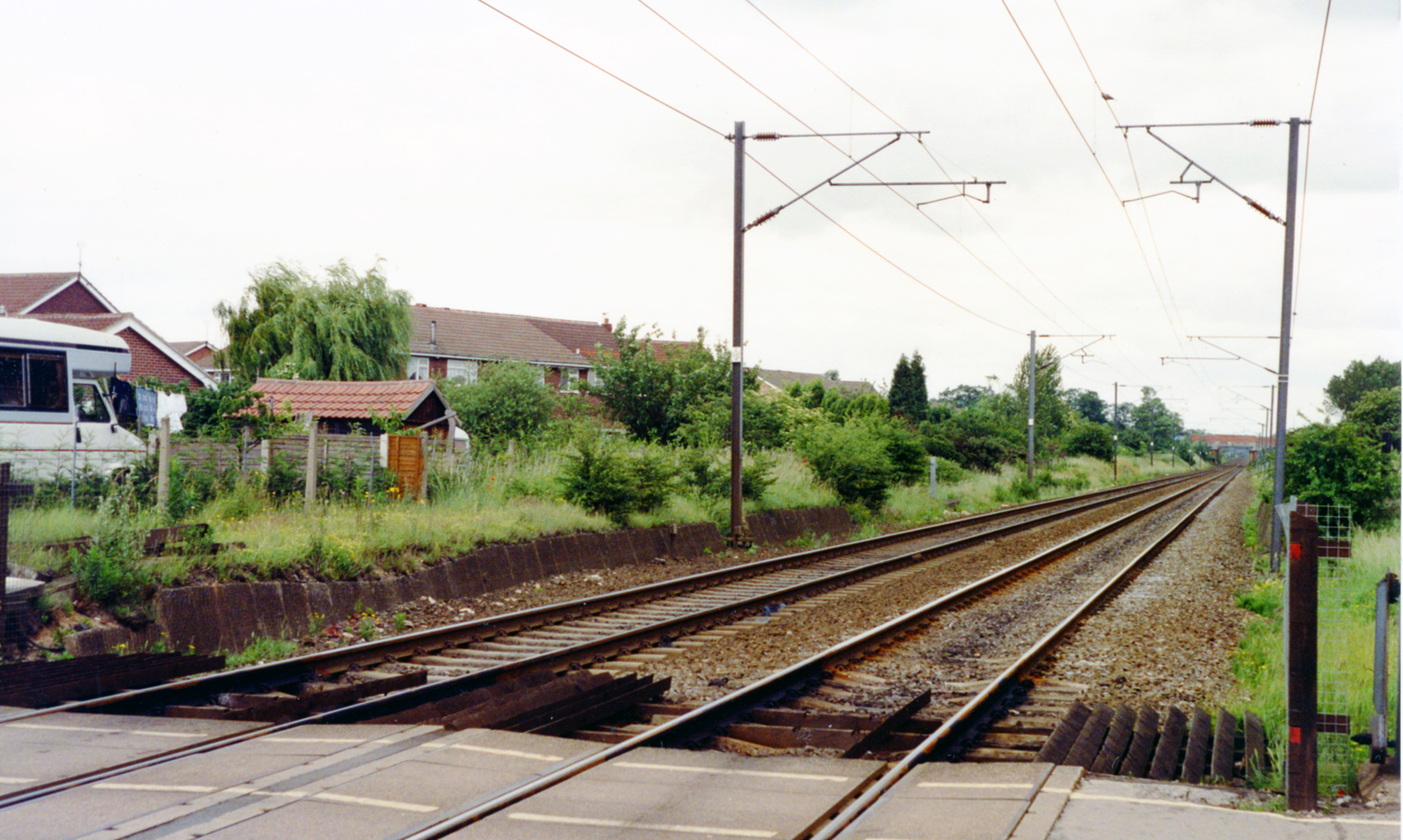
- Site of the former station in 1992

General information
- Location: Rossington, Doncaster; England
- Coordinates: 53.4779°N 1.0663°W
- Grid reference: SK620982
- Platforms: 2

Other information
- Status: Disused

History
- Original company: Great Northern Railway
- Post-grouping: London and North Eastern Railway; Eastern Region of British Railways

Key dates
- 4 September 1849: Opened
- 6 October 1958: Closed to regular passengers
- 27 May 1963: Goods facilities withdrawn
- 7 December 1964: Closed Completely
Location

Rossington was a railway station which served the village of Rossington on the Great Northern Railway's main line some 5.5 miles (9 km) south of Doncaster, England. It closed for regular passenger services in 1958 but was occasionally served by special trains until the mid-1960s.

== History ==
The station was set slightly west of the old village alongside the main road, from which access was gained, but on the building of the colliery village, known as New Rossington, to the west of the main line the station gained a whole new passenger base including miners travelling to work and home again, particularly before the colliery village was complete.

The station, with two flanking platforms, was set just south of the colliery junction.

Preceding station	Disused railways	Following station
Doncaster	London and North Eastern Railway; Retford to Doncaster	Bawtry
Warmsworth	Hull and Barnsley and Great Central Joint Railway; Hull and Barnsley and Great Central Joint Railway	Bawtry

== Present day ==
A new station at Rossington was suggested in a report to Doncaster Borough Council and with respect to this land was secured and reserved for the car park and approaches.

In September 2008 a report was submitted to Doncaster Borough Council on the strategy for prospective future rail corridors and stations in the area.
