= Bawtry railway station =

Former railway station in South Yorkshire, England

Bawtry
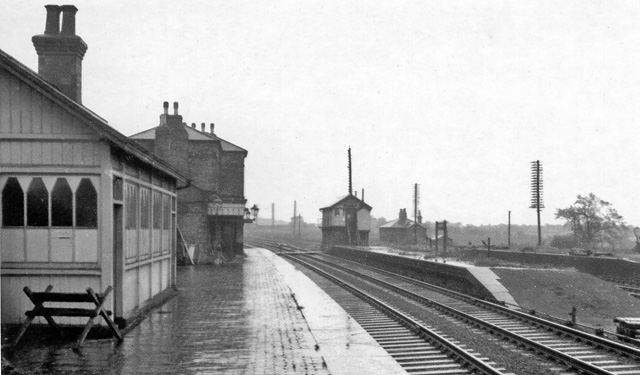
- Bawtry station

General information
- Location: Bawtry, Doncaster; England
- Coordinates: 53.4363°N 1.0146°W
- Grid reference: SK655937
- Platforms: ?

Other information
- Status: Disused

History
- Original company: Great Northern Railway
- Pre-grouping: Great Northern Railway
- Post-grouping: London and North Eastern Railway; Eastern Region of British Railways

Key dates
- 4 September 1849: Opened
- 6 October 1958: Closed to regular passenger services
- 7 December 1964: Closed to all passenger services
- 30 April 1971: Goods facilities withdrawn
Location

Bawtry railway station was situated to the east of the town of Bawtry, South Yorkshire, England on the Great Northern Railway main line between Retford and Doncaster.

== History ==
The lengthy platforms were situated to the north of the long, low viaduct, the main buildings being on the town (down) side of the line. A signal box was provided on the north end of the London-bound platform. The station was unique in its structures, these being highly individual. The main building had a small portico leading to the booking office at the front with all the usual facilities within the building. Platform shelters were in wood in typical style of the GNR.

In the first half of the 20th century the royal family customarily attended Doncaster races. They would alight at Bawtry, being greeted with the usual enthusiasm, and proceed by road to the racecourse.

It was the junction of the Bawtry to Haxey railway line, a freight only line to Misson and Haxey, which opened in 1912 and the remaining section to Misson closed in 1964.

The station closed to regular passenger services in 1958 but occasional special trains served the station until the mid-1960s.

Preceding station	Historical railways	Following station
Rossington	London and North Eastern Railway; Retford to Doncaster	Scrooby

== Present day ==
The buildings and platforms have been swept away but a couple of goods yard buildings are now houses.
