= Fellowes Brands =

American manufacturer of office equipment

Fellowes Brands, Inc.
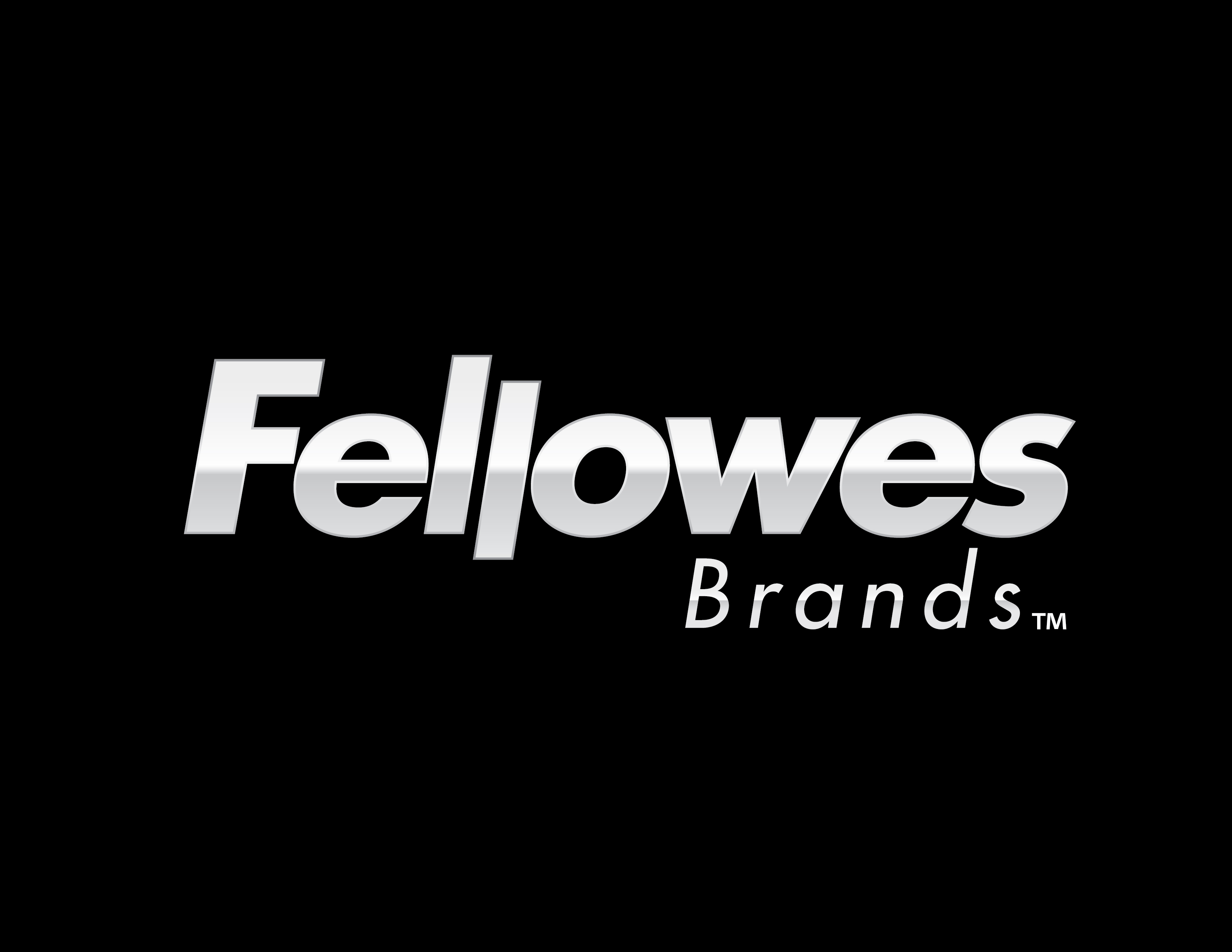
- Company type: Private company
- Industry: Workspace products
- Founded: 1917; 109 years ago (as Bankers Box Company)
- Founder: Harry Fellowes
- Headquarters: Itasca, Illinois, United States
- Key people: John Fellowes, CEO
- Website: www.fellowesbrands.com

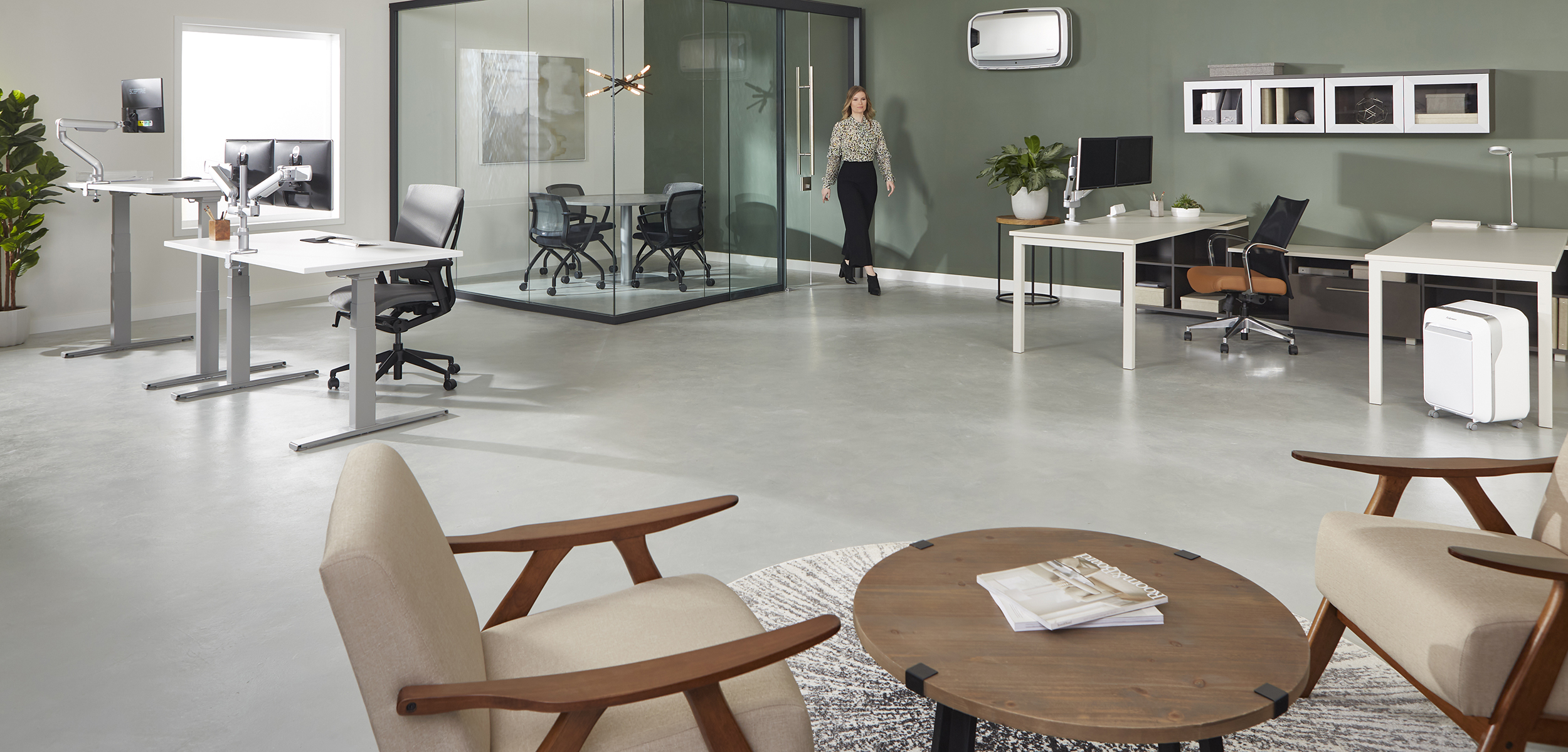
Photo of office with products produced by Fellowes Brands

Fellowes Brands, Inc. is a privately held manufacturer of office equipment based in Itasca, Illinois. The company was founded as the Bankers Box Company to manufacture the company's namesake Bankers Box record storage boxes. Since the 1960s, the company has diversified its portfolio of products, changing its name to Fellowes and becoming a market leader of paper shredders and record storage products in the United States.

After its expansion into business machines such as shredding, laminating, and binding, Fellowes Brands has expanded its brand to include various products, including modular walls, furniture, business machines, and paper shredders. commercial air purification, and commercial-grade workspace products.

Fellowes has been owned and operated by members of its namesake family since its foundation in 1917. The company operates 24 regional offices across the world and employs more than 1,000 people.

== History ==
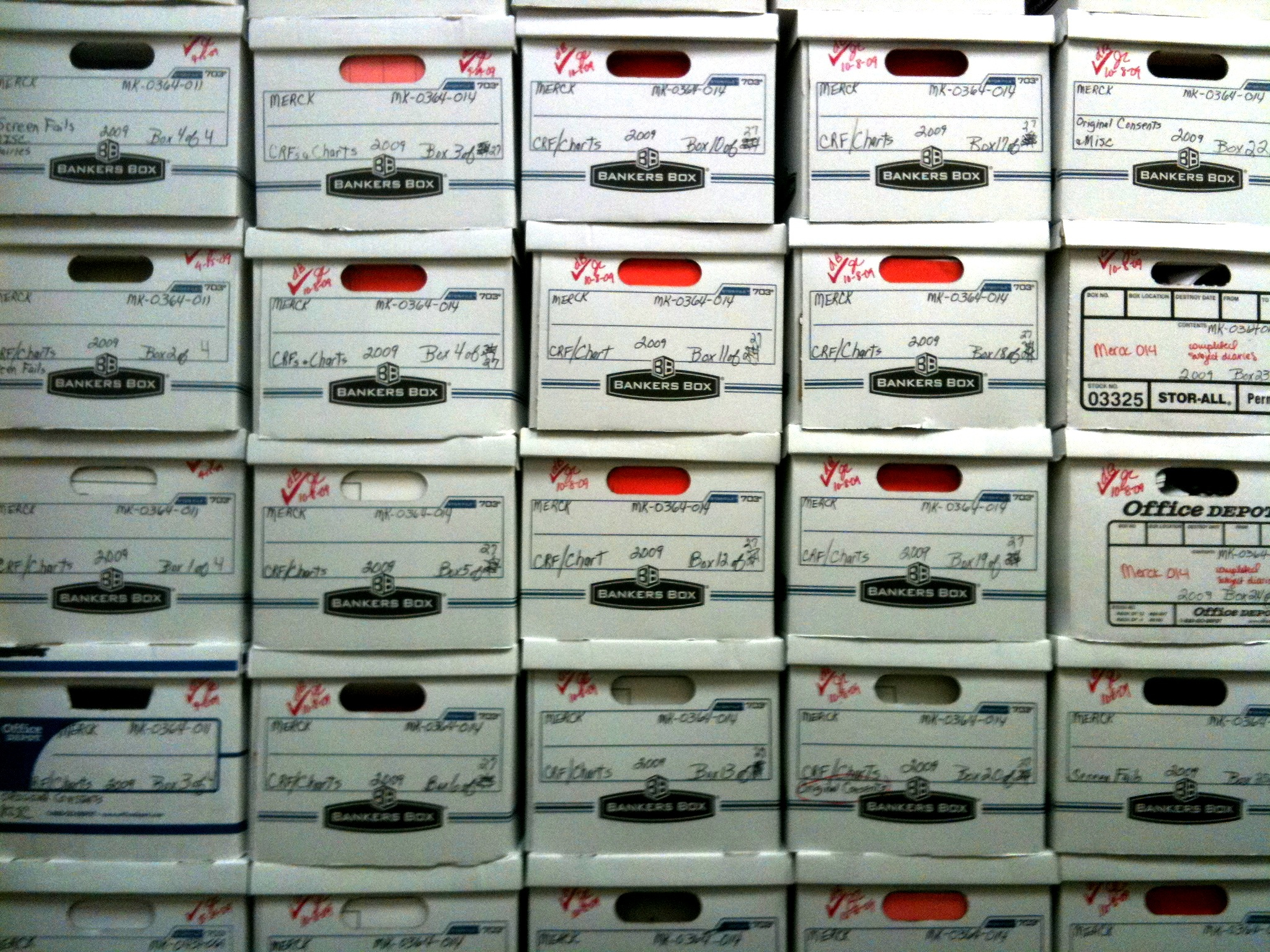
Several stacks of Bankers Boxes

The company was founded in Chicago, Illinois, in 1917 by Harry Fellowes and Walter Nickel as the Bankers Box Company, producing the Bankers Box line of record storage boxes. Sons Folger and John Fellowes joined the business in 1934 and 1938, respectively, and grandson James Fellowes joined in 1969 and was named president in 1983. The same year the company name was changed from Bankers Box to Fellowes to reflect an expansion into business machines and computer accessory products. James Fellowes would later become CEO in 1997. As the brand portfolio expanded, the company was named Fellowes Brands in 2015. The great-grandson of the founder and the fourth generation of the Fellowes family, John Fellowes, became CEO of Fellowes Brands in 2014. The company's corporate headquarters are in Itasca, Illinois.

In 2019, the company acquired Trendway Corporation, an office furniture manufacturer based in Holland, Michigan.

== General and cited sources ==
- Pederson, Jay P. (1999). International Directory of Company Histories. St. James Press. ISBN 9781558626690 – via the Internet Archive.
