= M18 motorway (Great Britain) =

Motorway in England

M18

- M18 highlighted in blue Shown with UK motorway network

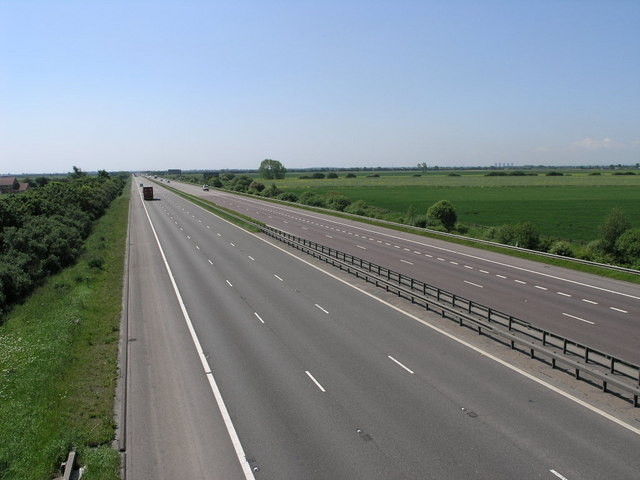
- Looking south near Rawcliffe, 2006

Route information
- Part of E13 and E22
- Maintained by National Highways
- Length: 26.5 mi (42.6 km)
- Existed: 1967–present
- History: Opened: 1967; Completed: 1979

Major junctions
- South-west end: Thurcroft; 53.3811°N 1.2785°W
- M1 motorway A1(M) motorway M180 motorway M62 motorway
- North-east end: Rawcliffe; 53.6825°N 0.9676°W

Location
- Country: United Kingdom
- Counties: South Yorkshire, East Riding of Yorkshire
- Primary destinations: Doncaster

Road network
- Roads in the United Kingdom; Motorways; A and B road zones
← M11	→ M20

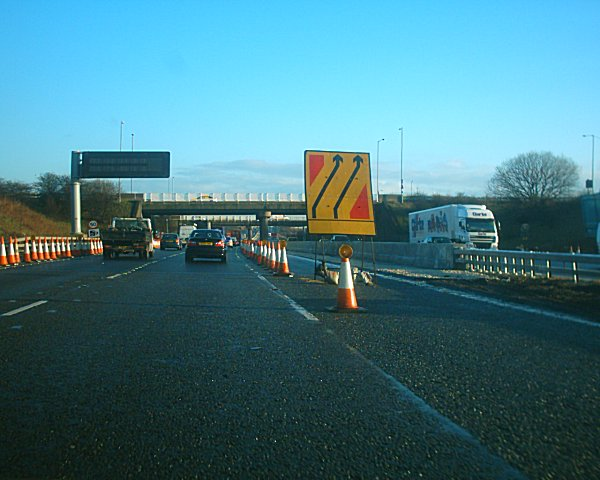
M18 northbound during the 2005–2006 roadworks

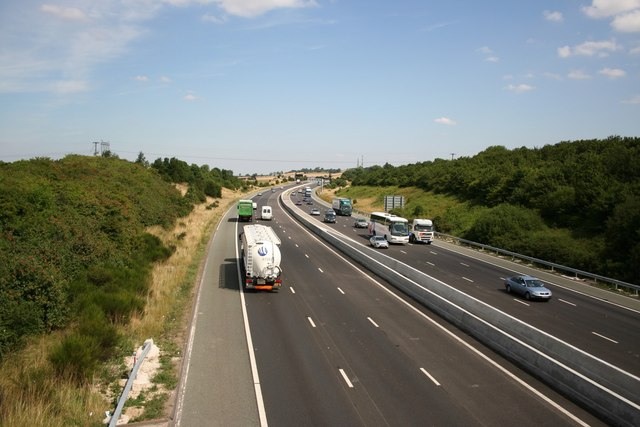
M18 in South Yorkshire

The M18 is a motorway in Yorkshire, England. It runs from the east of Rotherham to Goole and is approximately 26 miles (42 km) long. A section of the road forms part of the unsigned Euroroute E13.

== Route ==
The M18 runs in a north-east–south-west direction from junction 32 of the M1 motorway to junction 35 of the M62 motorway. It passes east of Rotherham, south-east of Doncaster and Armthorpe, and west of Thorne. It meets the A1(M) at junction 2 (A1(M) junction 35) — known as the Wadworth Interchange — and the M180 motorway at junction 5. Access to Doncaster is provided from junctions 3 (A6182) and 4 (A630)

The middle half of the M18 is a two-lane dual carriageway, and carries relatively low volumes of traffic. However, the M1 to A1(M) section and M180 to M62 section are much busier, with three lanes in each direction, and there is a small three-lane section northbound between junctions 2 and 3. It passes over the Wadworth Viaduct at junction 2. To the north it then crosses the East Coast Main Line, and until its closure and the dismantling of the pit head gear, a large colliery could be seen to the south at Rossington.

== History ==
The M18 was originally to be part of the M1, but it was decided to route the M1 towards Leeds instead of Doncaster, and the routing of what would have been the M1 east of Sheffield became the M18. To provide better access to Doncaster town centre and the new Great Yorkshire Way to Doncaster Sheffield Airport, the section of the M18 between junctions 2 and 3 northbound was upgraded to three lanes, between June 2014 and June 2015.

- Junction 1 to junction 2 opened in 1967
- Junction 5 to junction 6 opened in 1972
- Junction 6 to junction 7 opened in 1975
- Junction 4 to junction 5 opened in 1977
- Junction 2 to junction 4 opened in 1979

== Junctions ==
Data from driver location signs are used to provide distance and carriageway identifier information. The location sequence is a continuation of the M1 location sequence.

M18 motorway junctions
miles	km	Southbound exits (B carriageway)	Junction	Northbound exits (A carriageway)	Coordinates
156.8	252.4	The SOUTH, London, Nottingham; Sheffield, Leeds M1	M1, J32	Start of motorway	53.3974°N 1.2682°W
158.5	255.1	Rotherham A631	J1	Rotherham A631	53.4237°N 1.2513°W
163.8	263.6	Newark, Leeds A1(M)	J2	The NORTH, The SOUTH A1(M)	53.4794°N 1.1483°W
165.9	267.1	Doncaster A6182	J3	Doncaster A6182; Doncaster Sheffield	53.4886°N 1.1152°W
171.8	276.5	Doncaster A630	J4	Doncaster A630	53.5397°N 1.0220°W
175.8	283.0	Scunthorpe, Grimsby, Doncaster Sheffield, Humberside M180; Doncaster North services	J5; Services	Scunthorpe, Grimsby, Doncaster Sheffield, Humberside M180; Doncaster North Services	53.5914°N 0.9872°W
177.8	286.2	Thorne A614	J6	Thorne A614	53.6186°N 0.9777°W
		Entering South Yorkshire		Entering East Riding of Yorkshire	
182.7	294.0	Start of motorway	J7	The NORTH (A1(M)), Leeds; Hull, York, Goole M62	53.6776°N 0.9657°W
Notes: Distances in kilometres and carriageway identifiers are obtained from driver location signs/location marker posts. Where a junction spans several hundred metres and the data is available, both the start and finish values for the junction are shown.; Coordinate data from ACME Mapper.
1.000 mi = 1.609 km; 1.000 km = 0.621 mi

== See also ==
- List of motorways in the United Kingdom
