= Newham railway station =

Disused railway station in Northumberland, England

Newham
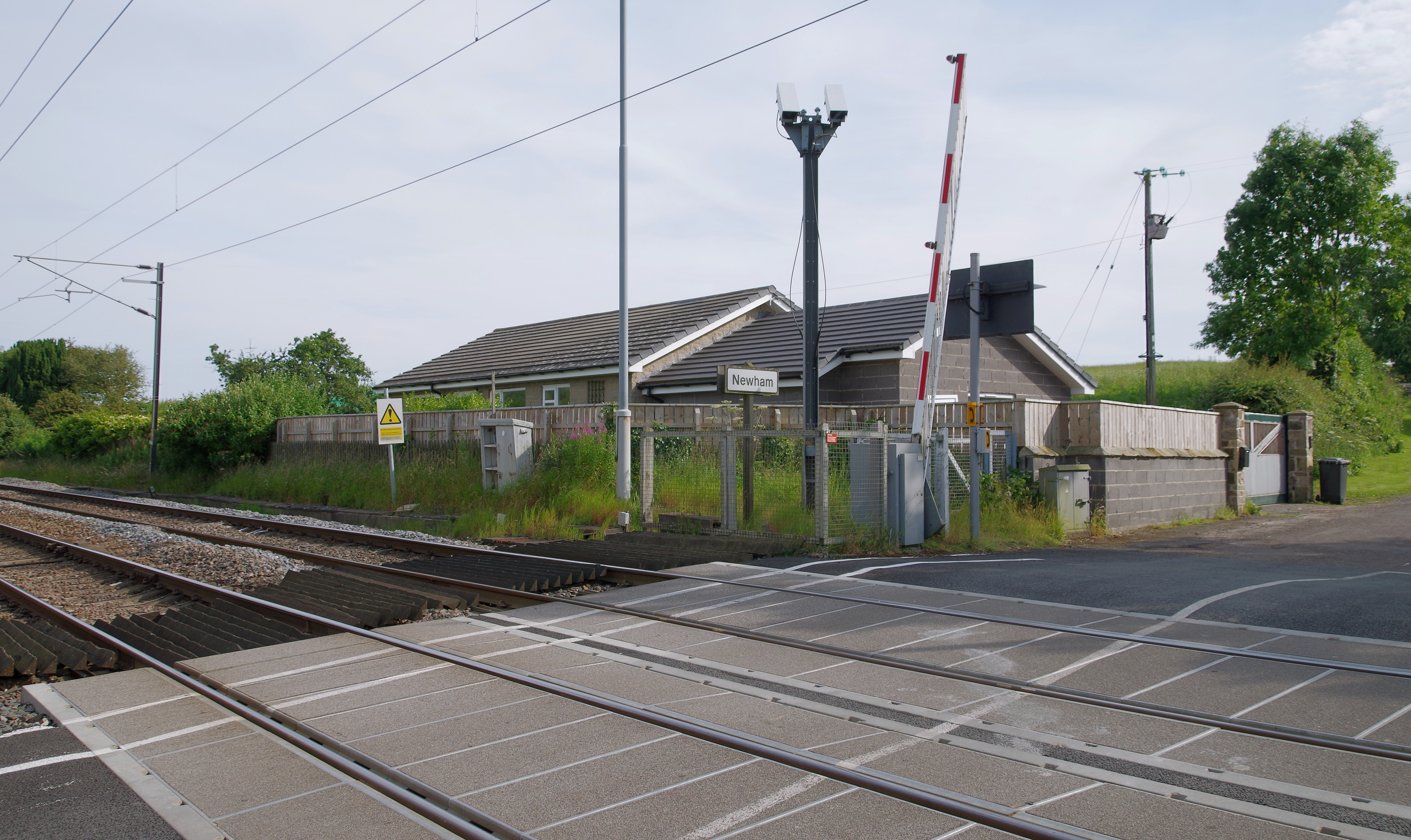
- The level crossing near the site of the station in 2014

General information
- Location: Newham Hall, Northumberland; England
- Coordinates: 55.5472°N 1.7274°W
- Grid reference: NU173282
- Platforms: 2

Other information
- Status: Disused

History
- Original company: York, Newcastle and Berwick Railway
- Pre-grouping: North Eastern Railway
- Post-grouping: LNER

Key dates
- 1 February 1851: Opened
- 5 May 1941: Closed as a wartime economy
- 7 October 1946: Reopened
- 25 September 1950: Closed
Location

Newham railway station was a railway station that served the hamlet of Newham Hall, Northumberland, England from 1851 to 1950 on the East Coast Main Line.

== History ==
The station opened on 1 February 1851 by the York, Newcastle and Berwick Railway. It was situated on both sides of the level crossing on an unnamed road southwest of the hamlet of Newham. Two sidings were to the south of the level crossing facing the down platform; one was elevated above the coal loading bank. Newham was one of the seven stations to be closed due to the Second World War and it reopened on 7 October 1946 but the Sunday services were stopped. There were very few services after the station reopened; there was an 8-hour gap from 9:30am to 5:34pm. This failed to attract passengers and it inevitably closed on 25 September 1950 and goods traffic stopped on the same day.

Preceding station	Historical railways	Following station
Chathill; Line and station open	York, Newcastle and Berwick Railway; East Coast Main Line	Lucker; Line open, station closed
