= Adwick railway station =

Railway station in South Yorkshire, England

Adwick
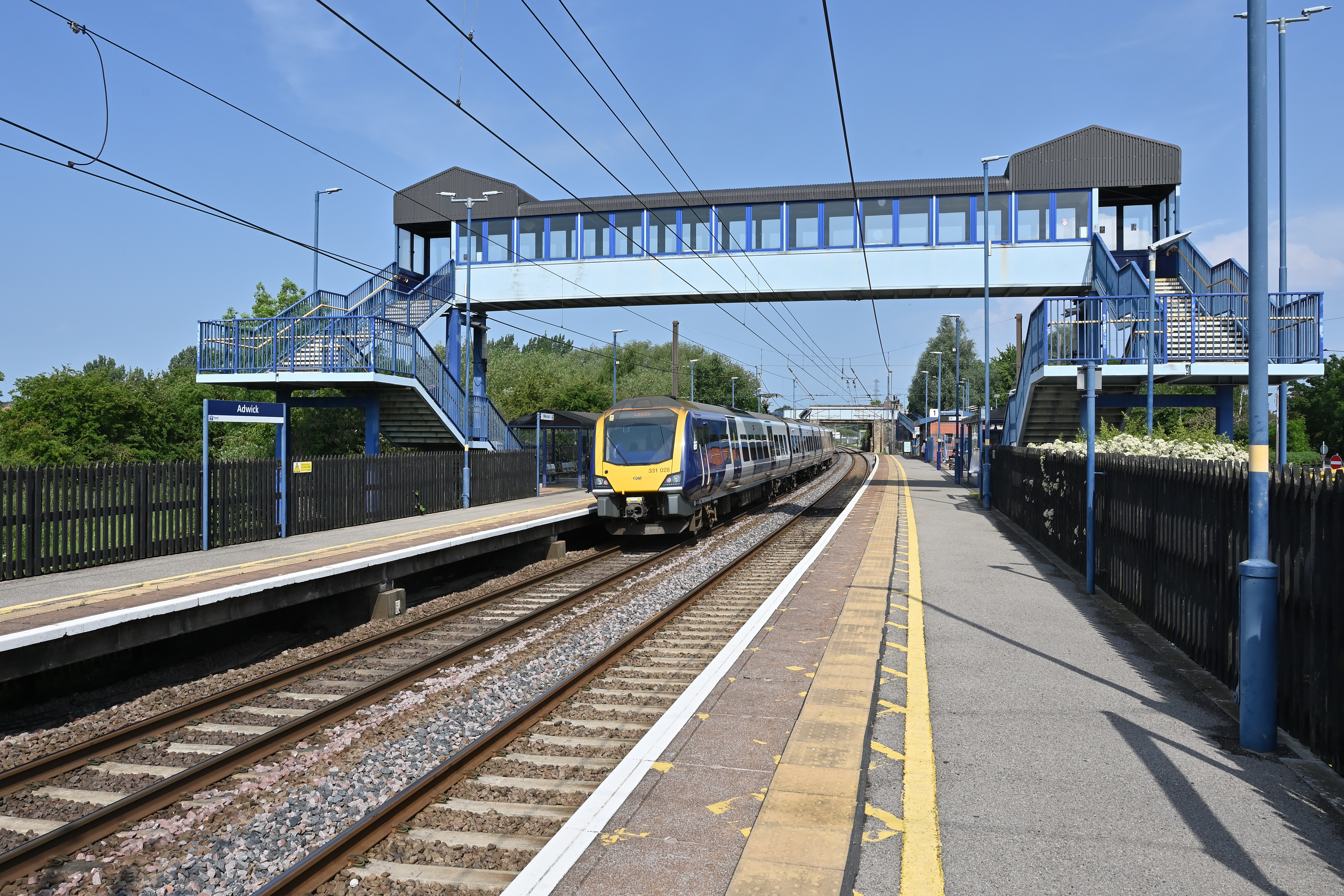
- 331028 in Adwick railway station

General information
- Location: Adwick le Street, City of Doncaster; England
- Coordinates: 53.5719°N 1.1797°W
- Grid reference: SE544086
- Manager: Northern
- Transit authority: South Yorkshire
- Platforms: 2

Other information
- Station code: AWK
- Fare zone: Doncaster
- Classification: DfT category F1

Key dates
- March 1866: Station opens as Adwick
- 1867: Station renamed Adwick-le-Street and Carcroft
- 1 May 1880: Station renamed Carcroft and Adwick-le-Street
- 6 November 1967: Station closes
- 11 October 1993: New station opens as Adwick on new site

Passengers
- 2020/21: ▼26,534
- 2021/22: ▲0.109 million
- 2022/23: ▲0.121 million
- 2023/24: ▲0.143 million
- 2024/25: ▲0.176 million
Location
Notes
- Passenger statistics from the Office of Rail and Road

Adwick railway station serves the communities of Adwick le Street and Carcroft, in the City of Doncaster, South Yorkshire, England. Located on the line linking Leeds to Doncaster via Wakefield, immediately south-east of the point where it passes beneath Church Lane, the present station is the second to serve Adwick: the first, the main building of which still stands, lay on the other side of the present road bridge.

== History ==
Opened in March 1866 as an intermediate stop on the West Riding and Grimsby Railway's main line from Wakefield Westgate to Doncaster, the station was at first called "Adwick-le-Street and Carcroft"; the name was changed in 1880 to "Carcroft and Adwick-le-Street".

The station's main building, which still stands today – though no longer part of the present station – comprised a booking office, waiting room, and station master's house. Situated on the Doncaster-bound (up) platform, it was constructed of rock-faced stone, with hipped roofs and a spire which was part of the living quarters. The Leeds-bound (down) platform was served by a small wooden, enclosed waiting shelter. This station was closed for goods traffic in June 1965 and for passengers in November 1967.

Adwick was reopened, with new platforms to the south-east of the original station site, by the South Yorkshire Passenger Transport Executive and British Rail in 1993.

== Facilities ==
The station is listed as being unstaffed on the National Rail website, but it has a staffed travel centre (run by SYPTE) that sells rail tickets. There are waiting rooms, CIS displays and timetable poster boards on both platforms; step-free access to both sides is via a ramped footbridge at the north end or lifts in the other footbridge at the south end.

== Services ==
Within reach of the A1 Junctions 37 and 38 and just off the A638, Adwick station provides a park and ride for Doncaster and a commuting station for Wakefield and Leeds. The station has ample free parking.

Northern operates an hourly Doncaster to Leeds service that stops here. During Monday to Saturday daytime, an hourly service also operates between Adwick and Sheffield (with the DMU running empty to nearby Skellow Junction to reverse), thus providing a 2-train-per-hour service to Bentley and Doncaster. In the evenings and on Sundays (both hourly) the station is served only by the Doncaster to Leeds stopping trains.

Preceding station	National Rail	Following station
Bentley	Northern; Wakefield Line	South Elmsall
Bentley	Northern; Wakefield Line	Terminus
