= Doncaster PSB =

Coordinates: 53°31′11.2″N 1°08′22.5″W

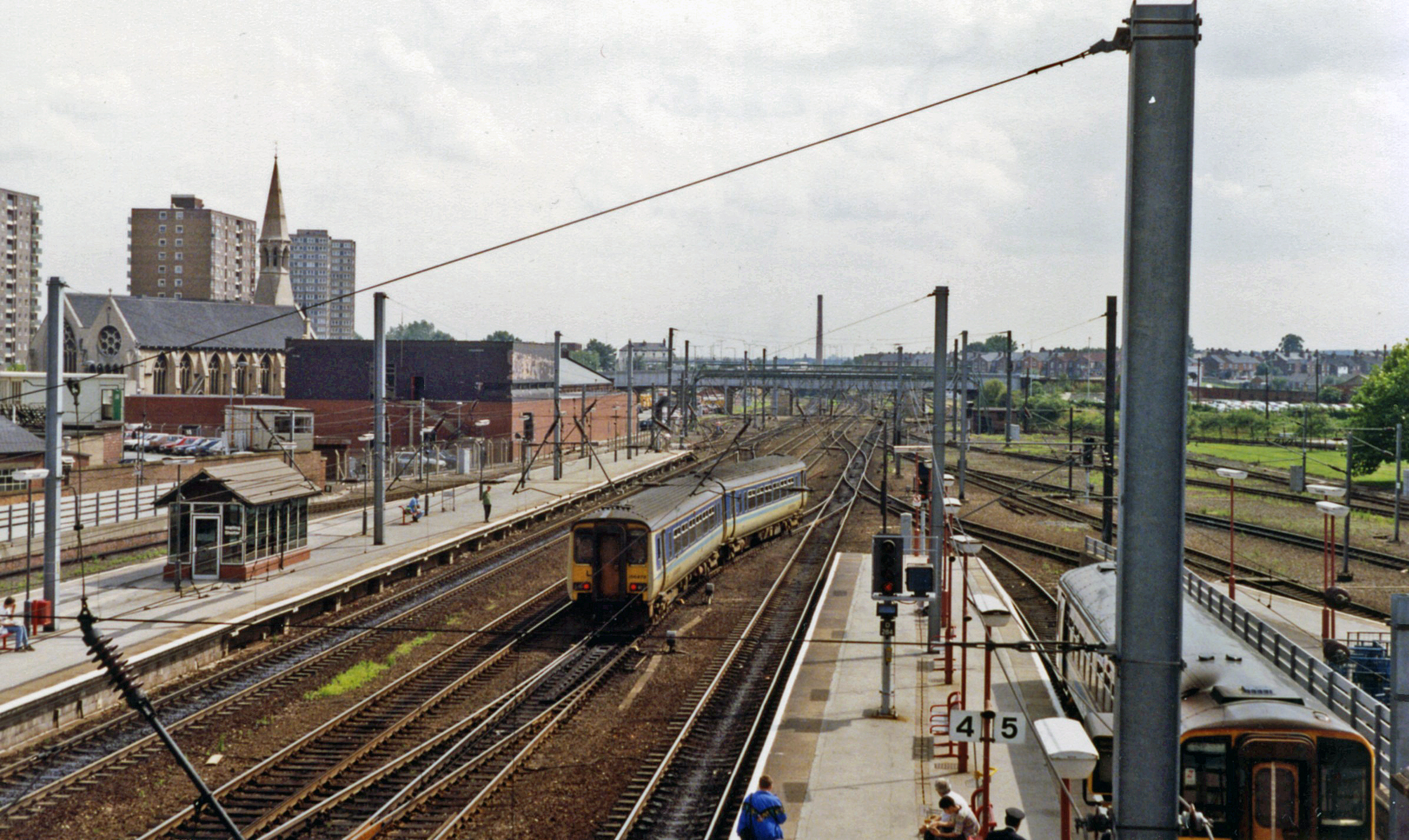
Doncaster station with the PSB to the left of the line

Doncaster PSB (power signal box) is a signalling centre on the East Coast Main Line (ECML) railway in the United Kingdom, principally covering the line in the area around Doncaster but also encompassing other lines diverging and converging to the ECML.

== Beginning ==
On 8 July 1979, the first section of the control panel in the new signal box at Doncaster became operational, controlling the movement of all trains in the immediate area of Doncaster station. This was a significant landmark in the progress of the whole resignalling and track rationalisation project and represented a major step forward in British Rail's drive toward the complete modernisation of the London – Edinburgh East Coast Main Line. The signal box was completed in 1981 and officially opened on 8 December 1981.

== East Coast Main Line upgrade ==
The Doncaster installation was the third major signal box to be commissioned on the East Coast Main Line, the previous two being King's Cross, completed in 1977 and Peterborough in 1973. Before the scheme's authorisation in 1974, train movement was controlled by a mixture of outdated semaphore and colour light signals operated from 52 signal boxes mainly containing mechanical lever frames, many dating from the 19th century.

Power signalling was installed in two signal boxes, one at the north and the other at the south of Doncaster station. The work was planned and some equipment was on site before the Second World War but the installation was not commissioned until 1949. Searchlight colour light signals and electric point machines were controlled from switch panels. The interlocking equipment was unique being a sequence switch interlocking system manufactured by Standard Telephone Company using telephone switching techniques to the technical specification of the signal engineer of the then Southern Area of the London and North Eastern Railway. The sequence switches consisted of a rotary contact shaft which was rotated to a route position and proved a circuit through contact wipers. Each switch had a "home" position and eleven route positions. When a route was initiated, a clutch was engaged on the appropriate switch to rotate it into its correct position thus setting up the appropriate interlocking circuits through other switches and relays. The installations proved to be remarkably reliable, serving a very useful purpose but were eventually life expired.

In association with the resignalling scheme was a major programme of track improvements to enable trains to run at speeds of up to 125 mph. This was achieved by simplification and rationalisation of the track layout and realignment of curves at many places.

An early improvement was the adaptation of an existing railway bridge south of Doncaster to become a flyover enabling trains to and from the Lincoln Line to cross over the main line without conflicting with the mainline trains.

The largest alteration to the track layout was in the Doncaster area where the work was staged over an extensive period.

== Marshgate Junction ==
Marshgate Junction to the north of Doncaster station forms the junction of the lines from the station to the double track to Leeds, York (ECML) and Thorne (thence Hull, Scunthorpe and Grimsby). The new layout entailed considerable changes from the then existing layout and it was estimated that the junction remodelling would take nine months of weekend work. A decision was made to carry this out during five weeks' continuous work in the spring of 1979 when the operation of trains through the area was drastically reduced and the Leeds Line was closed for a period of time. Although there were some inevitable diversions and retiming of trains, disruption of services was kept to a minimum and the project was completed on schedule.

The previous Marshgate Junction allowed for a maximum speed of 60 mph on the Doncaster – York main lines with diverging speeds of 25 mph on the main lines to and from Leeds and Thorne. Other speeds were 15 mph. The remodelling of the layout in association with other improvements in the Doncaster station area allowed speeds of 105 mph through the Doncaster section of the East Coast Main Line route. The divergence to and from the Leeds Line allowed a maximum speed of 70 mph. Other improvements on the Doncaster PSB area included raising the maximum permissible speed at Retford from 80 to 115 mph and at Newark from 80 to 100 mph.

Design of the scheme was governed by the need to satisfy operating requirements of speed and headway. Besides employing what was then modern signal equipment, an associated comprehensive communication network was necessary to achieve reliability and efficiency.

Track rationalisation and resignalling proceeded side-by-side, starting in the Grantham area and working progressively northward, while the new Doncaster signalling centre was constructed on a site south of the station and on the east side of the main line.

== Milestone ==
Colour light signalling on the East Coast Main Line from London to Edinburgh was completed on 24 September 1978 and the achievement was marked by the ceremonial withdrawal of the last semaphore signal at Decoy, south of Doncaster.

== Signalling centre ==
The signal box is a two-storey brick building, with the upper section clad in black ceramic tiles, the signal box complex houses the ground floor relay room, telecommunications room, standby generator room and also houses the maintenance team with offices and mess facilities. On the first floor is the signalling control room.

Dominating the control room is a 110 feet long illuminated signalling control panel, the wings of which are inclined toward the centre. On the near-vertical portion of the panel is depicted the track layout of the area controlled. Positioned on the layout to correspond with the location of all signals are push buttons which are used for operating points and clearing signals along the route selected for the passage of a train. Track circuits, which indicate the position of trains, are also shown on the diagram in distinctive colours.

Television monitor screens for two of the seven level crossings monitored by closed-circuit television (CCTV) from Doncaster PSB, are inset into the panel itself (Kirton Lane and Rossington) and the other five are mounted on a separate desk console (Daw Lane, Arksey, and Moat Hills on the ECML; Bentley, and Dock Hills on the Leeds Line).

Also on hand in the signal control room are read-out units for the special line side equipment, located at 16 sites, which detect overheating in the axle boxes of vehicles on passing trains. If an abnormally high temperature is recorded, the equipment will indicate the exact position in the train of the overheated axle, and the signaller can have the train stopped and the vehicle examined.

== Announcers ==
A separate desk is set aside for East Coast's Doncaster station announcer and the equipment for operation train destination visual displays that are transmitted to the screens on platforms at Doncaster, Retford, Newark North Gate and Grantham.

== Closure ==
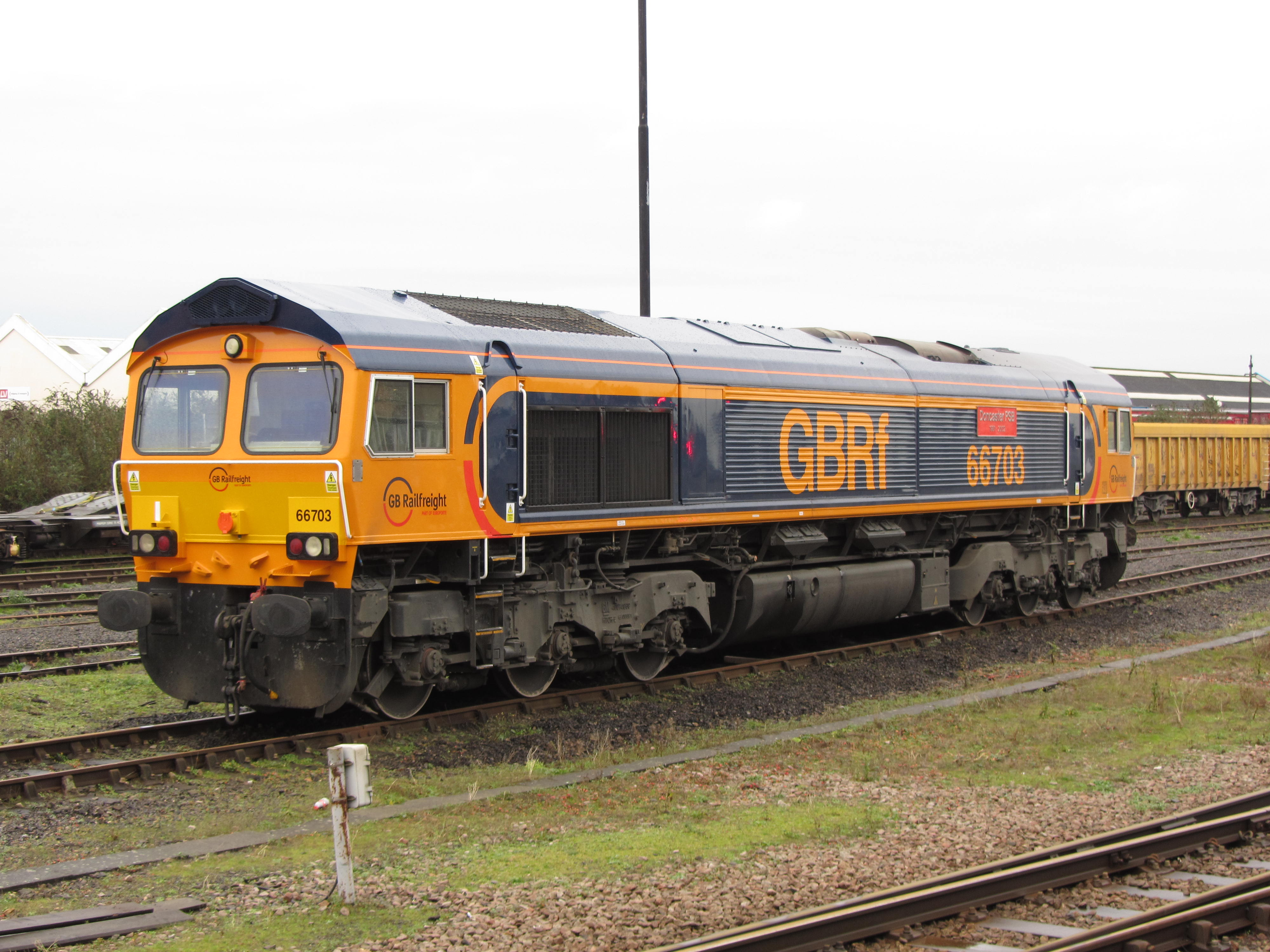
66703 at Eastleigh in 2014

Sometime in the future most of the signalling will be transferred to York Rail Operating Centre. This is part of Network Rail's drive to introduce twelve national control centres with digital signalling. York Rail Operating Centre will control all of Yorkshire, Lincolnshire, County Durham, Northumberland and the East Coast Main Line from Kings Cross to Berwick-Upon-Tweed.

== Locomotive naming ==
In 2002, GB Railfreight locomotive 66703 was named "Doncaster PSB 1981–2002" to celebrate the 21st birthday of this important signal box and show the close working relationship between GBRf and Doncaster PSB.
