= Doncaster railway station =

Principal railway station in South Yorkshire, England

Doncaster
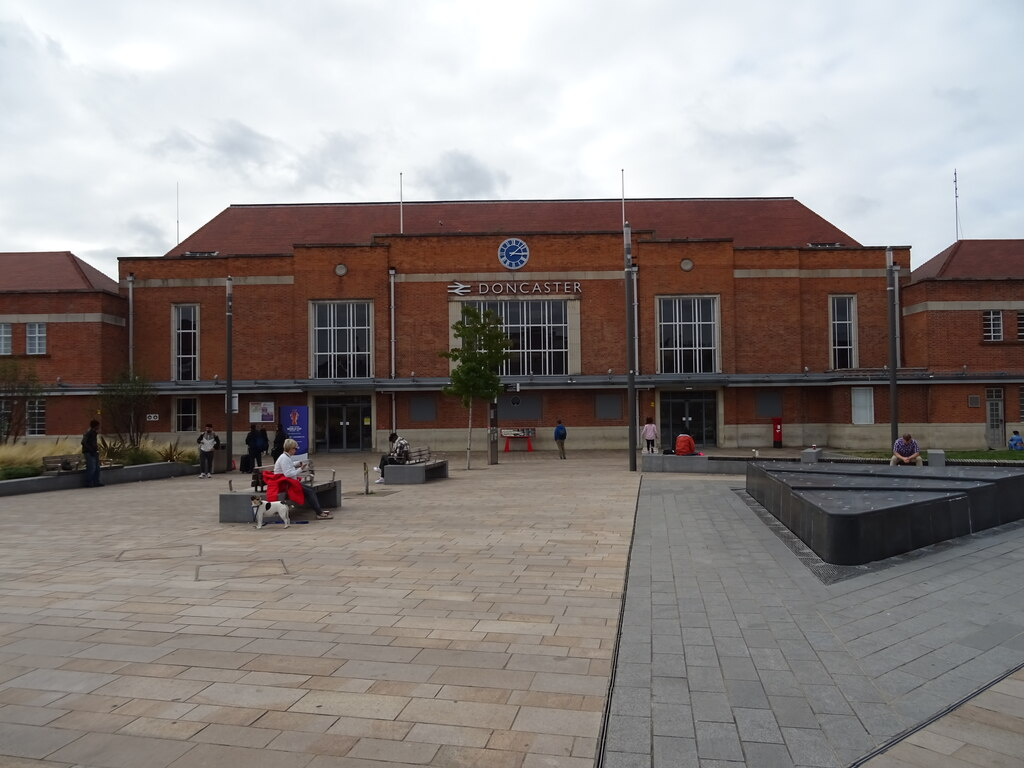
- The station frontage (2022)

General information
- Location: Doncaster, City of Doncaster, England
- Coordinates: 53.5225°N 1.1395°W
- Grid reference: SE571032
- Manager: London North Eastern Railway
- Transit authority: South Yorkshire
- Platforms: 9 (numbered 0–8)
- Tracks: 11

Other information
- Station code: DON
- Fare zone: Doncaster
- Classification: DfT category B

Passengers
- 2020/21: ▼0.890 million
- Interchange: ▼0.264 million
- 2021/22: ▲3.520 million
- Interchange: ▲1.011 million
- 2022/23: ▲3.635 million
- Interchange: ▼0.987 million
- 2023/24: ▲3.916 million
- Interchange: ▲1.509 million
- 2024/25: ▲4.534 million
- Interchange: ▲1.674 million

Listed Building – Grade II
- Feature: Station Booking Hall and Offices
- Designated: 25 April 1988
- Reference no.: 1193202
Location
Notes
- Passenger statistics from the Office of Rail and Road

Doncaster railway station is a principal stop on the East Coast Main Line, serving the city of Doncaster, South Yorkshire, England. It is 155 miles 77 chains (156.0 mi; 251.0 km) down the line from London King's Cross, and is situated between Retford and York on the main line. It is managed by London North Eastern Railway. It is the second-busiest station in South Yorkshire, after Sheffield, and the fourth busiest in the Yorkshire & the Humber region.

It is a major passenger interchange between the main line, Cross Country Route and local services running across Northern England. It is also the point for which London North Eastern Railway services branching off to Leeds diverge from the main route, which continues north towards Edinburgh Waverley.

== History ==
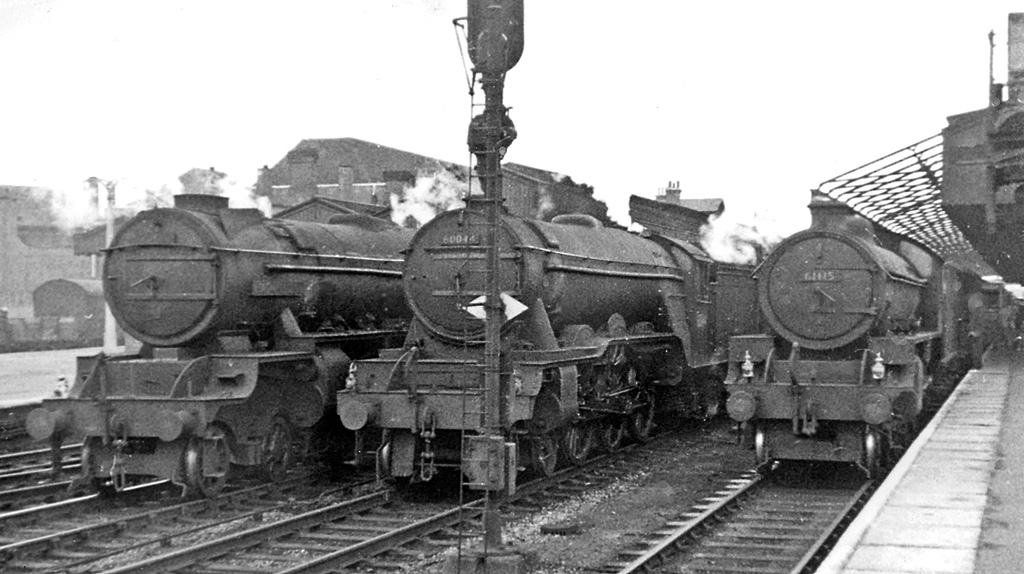
Line-up of steam locomotives (left-to-right: an A2/3, A3 and a B1) at Doncaster station in 1953

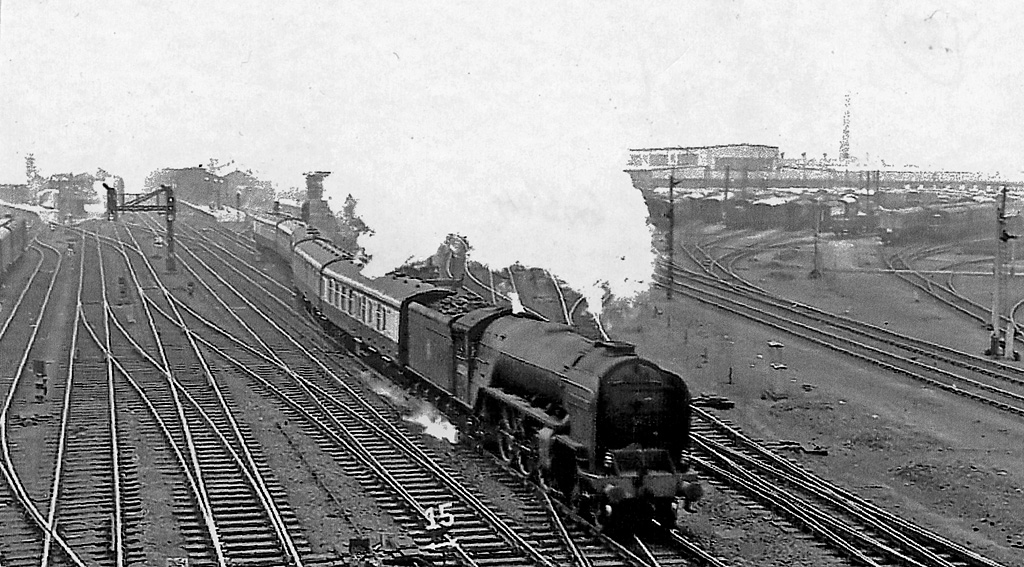
Down Express, headed by an A2/3, departing in 1957

The station was built in 1850, replacing a temporary structure constructed two years earlier and located some 450 yards (410 m) further south. Between 1850 and 1873, the station had two main platforms, with loops to each platform diverting off the main running lines.

It was rebuilt in its present form in 1938, where the platform on the town side of the station (the eastern side) was converted into an island platform thereby creating a fourth through running line. The station has had several slight modifications since that date: in 1976, a project to refurbish the passenger facilities was completed at a cost of £125,000 and, in 2006, the new interchange and connection to Frenchgate Centre opened.

The station was evacuated and services on the East Coast Main Line (ECML) stopped in March 1997 due to a bomb hoax called in by the IRA. Actual bombs were left at Wilmslow, in Cheshire, on the same day.

In May 2015, construction commenced on a new platform 0 to the north-east of the station adjacent to the Frenchgate Centre on the site of the former cattle dock. It is used by terminating Northern Trains services to Hull Paragon, Beverley, Bridlington and Scarborough. This allowed these services to operate independently of the ECML. It is joined to the rest of the station via a fully accessible overbridge.

=== Accidents and incidents ===
- On 9 August 1947, a passenger train was in a rear-end collision with another due to a signalman's error. 18 people were killed and 188 were injured.
- On 16 March 1951, a derailment occurred south of the station in which 14 passengers were killed and 12 seriously injured.

== Platforms ==
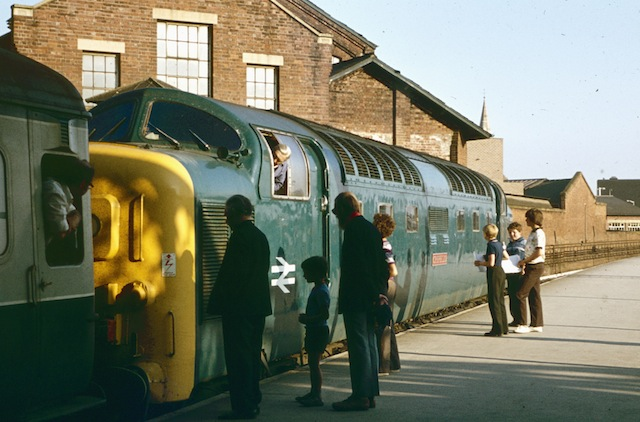
A Class 55 Deltic locomotive no.55012 Crepello coupling to the Hull-London King's Cross train as train spotters watch on (1977)

The station has nine platforms on three islands: platforms 1, 3, 4 and 8 can take through trains; platforms 2 and 5 are south-facing bays; and platforms 0, 6 and 7 are north-facing bays. A first class lounge is available on platform 3A.

- Platform 0 is used to take almost exclusively Northern Trains services to and from Hull, Beverley and Bridlington. It was opened on 12 December 2016.
- 1 is used by southbound London North Eastern Railway, Grand Central and Hull Trains services to London King's Cross
- 2 is a bay platform used by East Midlands for services to Lincoln Central.
- 3A is used by London North Eastern Railway, Grand Central and Hull Trains services to London King's Cross.
- 3B is used by Northern Trains services to Sheffield and TransPennine Express services to Manchester Piccadilly.
- Between 3 and 4 are the high speed up and down lines to/from London.
- 4 is used by northbound London North Eastern Railway services to York, Newcastle and Edinburgh Waverley; Grand Central services to Bradford Interchange; Hull Trains services to Hull; Northern Trains through services to Bridlington and Scarborough; and TransPennine Express services to Cleethorpes. Southbound CrossCountry services towards Birmingham New Street also use this platform.
- 5 is a bay platform used by East Midlands Railway services to Lincoln and Northern Trains services to Sheffield.
- 6 is a bay used by Northern Trains services to Leeds.
- 7 is seldom in public use, but is used by Northern Trains services to Scunthorpe when it is.
- 8 is used by northbound LNER services towards Leeds; CrossCountry services to Newcastle and Northern Trains services in both directions – southbound to Sheffield and northbound to Adwick and Scunthorpe. Services towards Birmingham New Street also use this platform.

There were plans to add platforms 9 and 10 to cope with Eurostar trains, but this project was cancelled when it was decided that Eurostar would not serve Britain outside South East England.

There are presently no ticket barriers in operation at this station; however, on race days at Doncaster Racecourse, manual ticket checks are in operation in the subway.

The station was refurbished in 2006 and is now directly connected to the Frenchgate Centre extension in Doncaster town centre. It now has a new booking office for tickets and information, three new lifts, refurbished staircases and subway. There is a newsagent and some food outlets. More recently, interactive touch screens have been installed around the station by LNER services to provide information about local attractions, live departures and disruptions and station facilities.

In addition, mobile phone charging points are now available on the concourse, touch screen and self-service ticketing machines have been installed across the concourse; the stairways to the subway have now been divided into two way systems to improve the flow of passengers during peak times.

In a route study by Network Rail, it was proposed that new platforms could be built on the western side of the station to meet expected demand in the future.

In March 2019, it was revealed that there were plans, as part of the East Coast improvement programme in Control Period 6, to add an additional platform at Doncaster.

== Services ==
Seven train operating companies call at Doncaster; their general off-peak weekday service patterns in trains per hour/day (tph/tpd) are as follows:

CrossCountry:

- 6 tpd to York, of which:
  - 4 tpd continue to Newcastle, via Darlington and Durham
- 4 tpd to Reading, via Derby, Birmingham New Street and Oxford
- 1 tpd to Birmingham New Street via Sheffield and Derby.

East Midlands Railway:

- 5 tpd to Peterborough, via Gainsborough Lea Road, Lincoln Central and Sleaford.

Grand Central:

- 4 tpd to London King's Cross; of which:
  - 3 tpd are non-stop
  - 1 tpd stops at Peterborough
- 4 tpd to Bradford Interchange, via Wakefield Kirkgate, Mirfield and Halifax; of which:
  - 2 tpd calling at Pontefract Monkhill.

Hull Trains:

- 7 tpd to London King's Cross, via Retford and Grantham
- 7 tpd to Hull Paragon, via Selby, Howden and Brough; of which:
  - 2 tpd continue to Beverley, via Cottingham.

Platforms of the station, with an LNER Azuma train at platform 4

London North Eastern Railway:

- 7 tp2h to London King's Cross; of which:
  - 3 tph are semi-fast
  - 1 tp2h is slow via Retford
- 2 tph to Leeds, via Wakefield Westgate; of which:
  - 1 tp2h continue to Harrogate, via Horsforth
  - 1 tp2h continue to Bradford Forster Square, via Shipley
  - 1 tpd continues to Skipton, via Keighley
- 1 tph to Edinburgh Waverley, via York, Darlington and Newcastle
- 1 tp2h to York
- 1 tpd to Hull Paragon, via Selby and Brough
- 1 tpd to Inverness, via York, Darlington and Newcastle.

Northern Trains:

- 2 tph to Sheffield; of which:
  - 1 tph slow, via Mexborough, Rotherham Central and Meadowhall Interchange
  - 1 tph semi-fast, via Meadowhall Interchange
- 1 tp2h to Scunthorpe, via Kirk Sandall, Crowle and Althorpe
- 2 tph to Hull Paragon; of which:
  - 1 tph continues to Scarborough, via Beverley, Bridlington and Seamer, and operates semi-fast to Hull Paragon
- 1 tph to Adwick, via Bentley
- 1 tph to Leeds, via Adwick, Fitzwilliam and Wakefield Westgate.

TransPennine Express:

- 1 tph to Liverpool Lime Street, via Sheffield, Manchester Piccadilly and Warrington Central
- 1 tph to Cleethorpes, via Scunthorpe, Barnetby and Grimsby Town.

Preceding station	National Rail	Following station
Sheffield	CrossCountry Cross Country Route	York
Retford or Newark Northgate	London North Eastern Railway; London-York/Newcastle/Edinburgh	York
Newark Northgate	London North Eastern Railway; London-Edinburgh/north Scotland	York
Retford or Newark Northgate	London North Eastern Railway; London-Doncaster	Terminus
Grantham, Peterborough or Retford	London North Eastern Railway; London-Leeds	Wakefield Westgate
Newark Northgate or Grantham	London North Eastern Railway; London-Hull (Limited service)	Selby
Terminus	East Midlands Railway Doncaster-Lincoln Line	Gainsborough Lea Road
Retford	Hull Trains; London-Hull/Beverley	Selby
Meadowhall	TransPennine Express South Humberside Main Line	Scunthorpe
Conisbrough	Northern Trains South Humberside Main Line	Kirk Sandall
Terminus	Northern Trains Wakefield Line	Bentley
Peterborough or London King's Cross	Grand Central; West Riding	Pontefract Monkhill or Wakefield Kirkgate
	Future services	
Sheffield	Northern Trains; Sheffield-Hull	Hull
Sheffield	TBA; Northern Powerhouse Rail	Hull
	Historical railways	
Terminus	Great Northern and Great Eastern Joint	Bessacarr Halt; Line open, station closed
Rossington; Line open, station closed	Great Northern Railway; East Coast Main Line	Arksey; Line open, station closed

== See also ==
- Listed buildings in Doncaster (Town Ward)
- Joan Croft Halt railway station (North Doncaster Chord project)
- Doncaster Works – a locomotive works adjacent to the station.
