= Hesleden =

English village in County Durham

Coordinates: 54°44′12″N 1°18′54″W

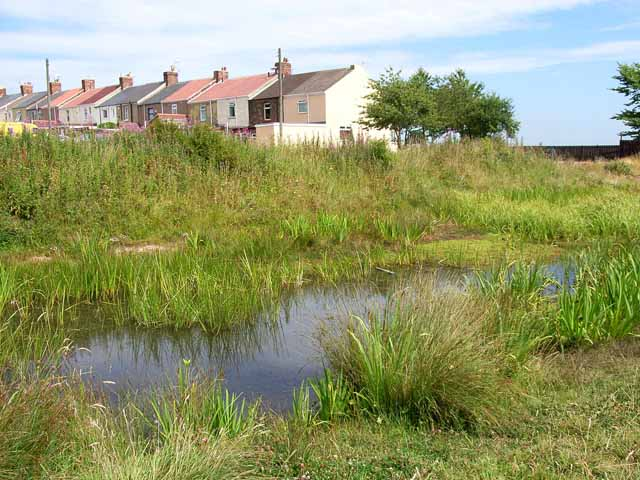
Hesleden

Hesleden (/ˈhɛzəldən/ HEZ-əl-dən) is a village in County Durham, England, south of Peterlee. The name is a combination of Dene and Hesle, which is from "hazel". The combined population of the five communities making up the parish of Monk Hesleden was 5,722 at the 2011 Census.

== Governance ==
Monk Hesleden Parish Council, set up in December 1894, has twelve serving councillors, who act as the first tier of local government for the communities of Blackhall Colliery, Crimdon, Hesleden, High Hesleden and Monk Hesleden. The regional tier is provided by the Durham County Council, with 126 councillors elected from 63 wards. It is covered by the parliamentary constituency of Darlington.

== Education and worship ==
The community has a primary school, which had 125 pupils on the school roll in the 2018/2019 school year. It was classed as "good" at an Ofsted inspection on 5 March 2020. It offers a pre-school Breakfast Club and an After-School Club to needful pupils.

Hesleden Methodist Church officially closed in June 2021. Built in 1876, it was renovated in 1968. There is an Anglican church at nearby Blackhall – St Andrew's, with twice-weekly services.

== Amenities ==
Heselden has a post office and general store in Front Street

== Sports and recreation ==
Blackhall Welfare Park, managed and maintained by Monk Hesleden Parish Council, provides recreation and leisure facilities for the community. It is used by village cricket, association football and bowls teams. The park opened in 1929 and was managed and funded by the Miners Welfare Scheme until the closure of the local Blackhall Colliery in 1981. The parish council took over in 1989. Funds from the Coalfields Regeneration Trust were involved in completing new changing rooms, which opened in October 2010.

== Transport ==
The village is served by the Monday–Saturday No. 206 bus route between Peterlee and Wingate.

The nearest rail service is from Horden railway station. It offers an hourly service between Nunthorpe and Hexham. Hexham has frequent services to Newcastle and Carlisle. Nunthorpe has regular services to Middlesbrough.

The B1281 secondary road along the north side of the village provides a link with the main north–south A19 and with the coastal A1086 between Hartlepool and Sunderland.

== Notable people ==
- Colin Bell (1946–2021), England and Manchester City footballer, was born in Hesleden. He died after a short illness on 5 January 2021.
- Courtney Hadwin (born 2004), a noted singer-songwriter, lives in Hesleden with her family.
