= Monk Hesleden =

Village and civil parish in County Durham, England

Coordinates: 54.729°N 1.294°W

Monk Hesleden is a village and civil parish in County Durham, England. The population of the parish at the 2011 Census was 5,722. The parish is situated to the north-west of Hartlepool, and is on the North Sea coast. Monk Hesleden village is situated a short distance to the south of High Hesleden.

The parish has an area of 1,091.35 hectares (4.2137 sq mi) and includes the villages or hamlets of Blackhall Colliery, Blackhall Rocks, Crimdon, Hesleden, High Hesleden and Monk Hesleden. It has a parish council.

== Etymology and history ==
Hesleden is believed to be derived from the local word Dene(den) meaning a deep forested Valley, and Hesle a corruption of Hazel, so the original meaning may have been, "Forested Valley of the Hazel trees", which are common in the Nesbit, Crimdon and Hesleden Denes, that border the village. As for the "Monk", that may either refer to the Church which, once existed, or perhaps some earlier monastic foundation. Or that more likely, the lands around it may have once belonged to the Bishopric of Durham. This had been a common feature, throughout the Palatine of Durham, before the Reformation. The Prince Bishops, later Bishops, had an Archdeaconry in nearby Easington, and it is recorded that a great deal of land in the area lay under their ownership.

The Church of St. Marys, at Monk Hesleden can be dated as far back as the 13th century, though by the time it was photographed in the 19th century, it had been greatly altered, giving the impression, externally at least, of a much later structure, almost Georgian in style. For a long time, St. Marys' was the only local church, until the construction of St. James at Castle Eden, in the 1760s. Even with the advent of the collieries at Blackhall, Hesleden, and Horden, for a great deal of time, St. Mary's was the only local Anglican church, and with Castle Eden, the only local cemetery, so despite the village's dwindling population, the church had survived. Unfortunately the church received some minor vandalism in the 1960s, and the council demolished the structure, leaving us today with only the Graveyard and a post, somewhat like a tombstone, marking the site. Despite the disappearance of the church, the parish lives on in name, and following the reorganisation of parishes in the 1980s, included the churches of St. James at Castle Eden, St. Andrew's at Blackhall, St Marys in Horden, St. Cuthbert in Peterlee, and St Johns Church at Hesleden. In 2016, St. James, Castle Eden was closed. Monk Hesleden now sits within the new geographical parish of Castle Eden and Blackhall, with the one remaining parish church at St. Andrew's in Blackhall.

On the first Ordnance Survey Maps, the village appears under the name of "Church Hesleden", and in fact it is High Hesleden, that has the name of Monk Hesleden.

Today only one cottage (once part of a row of cottages, as you enter by the one road, into the village), Smiles-Taylor Farm, the former Rectory, as well as a couple of more recent bungalows, are all that remain of the village.
