= High Hesleden =

Village in County Durham, England

Coordinates: 54°44′11″N 1°17′41″W

High Hesleden is a village in Monk Hesleden parish, County Durham, in England. It is situated a few miles north of Hartlepool, between Blackhall Rocks and Hesleden.

High Hesleden is located mostly along one street, on one side of which lies the village green; there is a turn off (although difficult to recognise), for Monk Hesleden and there is a small country lane which takes you down to Crimdon.
