= Horden railway station =

Railway station in County Durham on the Durham Coast Line

Horden
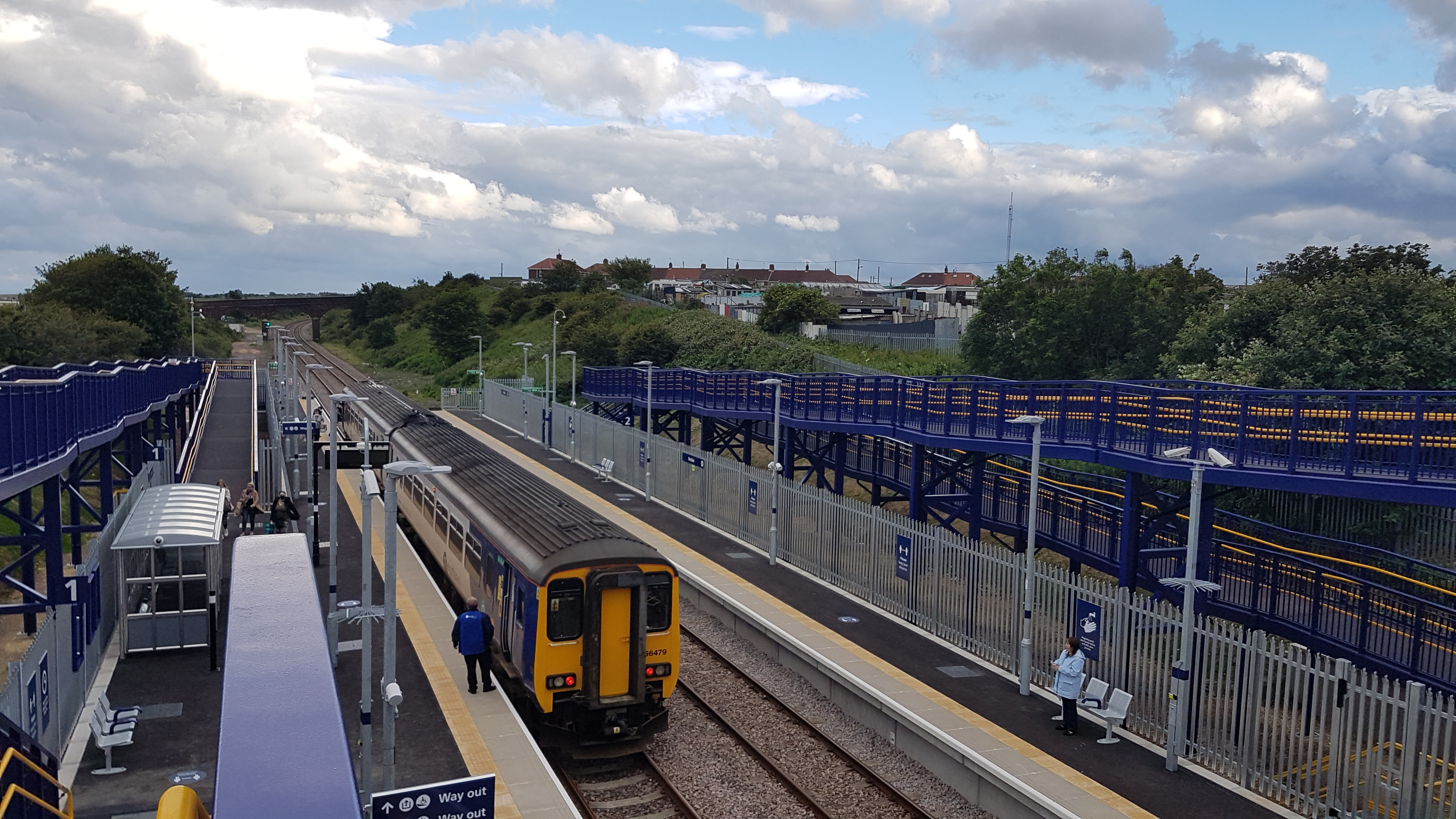
- The current (second) station, photographed in June 2020.

General information
- Location: Horden, County Durham; England
- Coordinates: 54°45′50″N 1°18′26″W
- Grid reference: NZ447412
- Owner: Network Rail
- Manager: Northern Trains
- Platforms: 2
- Tracks: 2

Other information
- Station code: HRE

History
- Original company: North Eastern Railway
- Pre-grouping: North Eastern Railway
- Post-grouping: London and North Eastern Railway; British Rail (North Eastern)

Key dates
- 1 April 1905: Opened
- 4 May 1964: Closed
- 29 June 2020: Resited and reopened

Passengers
- 2020/21: 33,038
- 2021/22: ▲96,858
- 2022/23: ▲99,564
- 2023/24: ▲0.137 million
- 2024/25: ▲0.165 million
Location
- Location within County Durham

Horden (also known as Horden Peterlee during the planning stage) is a railway station on the Durham Coast Line, which runs between Newcastle and Middlesbrough via Hartlepool. The station, situated 10 miles 74 chains (17.6 km) south-east of Sunderland, serves the villages of Horden, Blackhall Colliery and Easington along with the town of Peterlee in County Durham, North East England. It is owned by Network Rail and managed by Northern Trains.

The station opened on 29 June 2020, following a £10.55 million investment. It is the second station to have been located in the village, having replaced an earlier station, located approximately 200 yards (180 m) further south, which closed on 4 May 1964 during the Beeching cuts.

== History ==
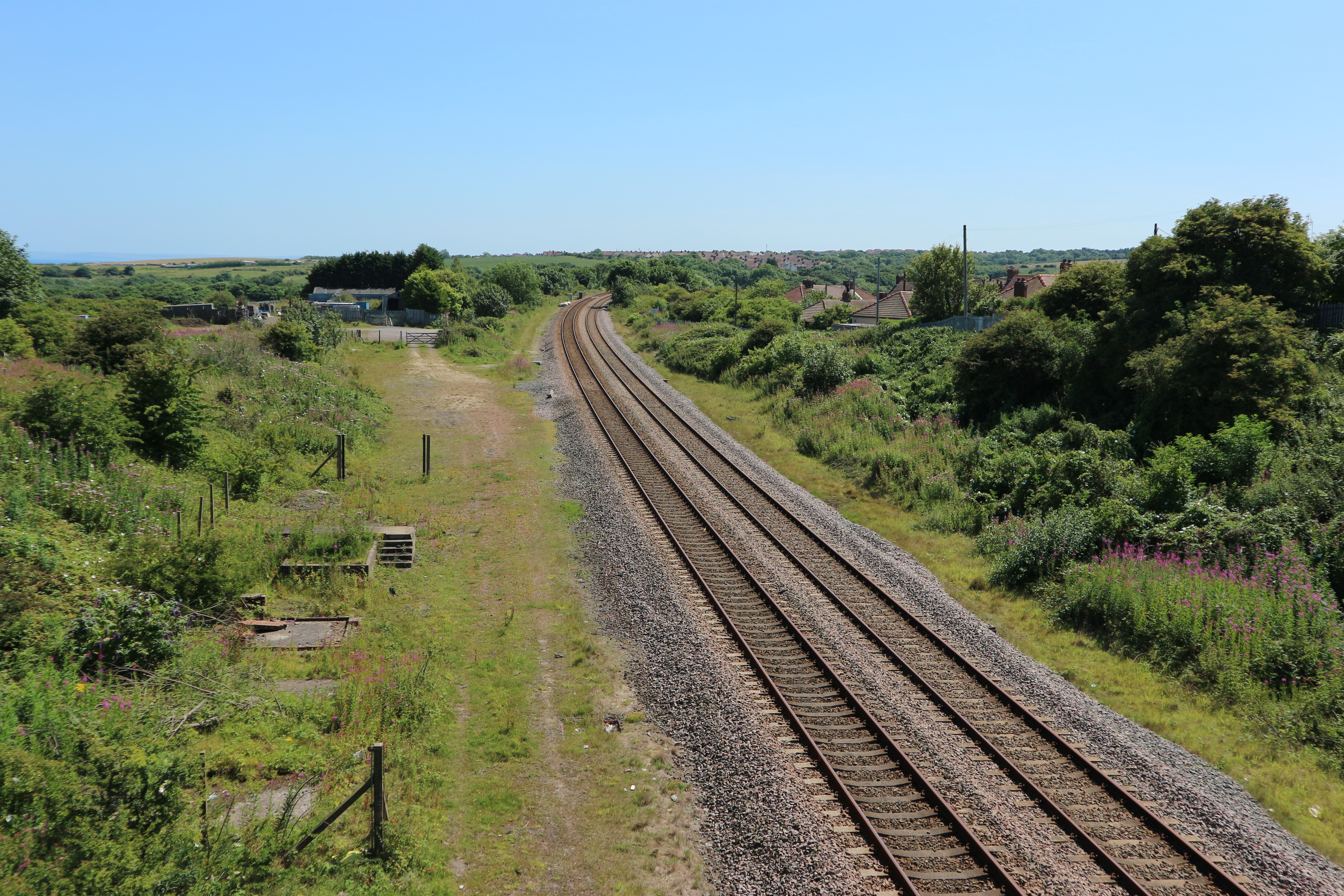
Site of the original station, photographed in July 2017. The current station is located a short distance behind the camera.

The original station at Horden was opened by the North Eastern Railway on 1 April 1905. The station opened as part of the North Eastern Railway's project to build a new coastal line, by linking together Seaham and Hart on the routes of the earlier Londonderry (Seaham to Sunderland) Railway and Hartlepool Dock and Railway. This new line had been constructed primarily to avoid the steep gradients of the inland route at Seaton Bank and Hesleden Bank, but also provided access to the newly developed collieries of the Durham Coast.

A six-inch Ordnance Survey map from 1922 shows the station, along with a station hotel, located at what was then the southern end of the new settlement, which was built to house workers from the nearby Horden Colliery.

The new town of Peterlee was established in 1948, and is located about a mile to the west of Horden. Hence, at the time, Horden had been the closest railway station to the town. However, despite the development of this new town, the station was recommended for closure in the Beeching Report and was duly closed on 4 May 1964. Nearby stations at Blackhall Colliery and Easington were also closed.

== Reopening ==
It had been a long-held ambition of Durham County Council to reopen a station on the Durham Coast Line between Seaham and Hartlepool, to serve the communities in the county's south east. The council investigated seven potential sites in the area, initially selecting a site adjacent to the Sea View Industrial Estate in Horden as the most suitable for a new station. The site was located about 3/4 mile (1.2 km) to the north of the original station.

It was identified that one of the key benefits of reopening Horden, as opposed to any of the other closed stations on the Durham Coast Line was the station's close proximity to Peterlee, which has grown significantly since 1964. This allowed the potential for 61,000 residents to benefit from improved access to employment opportunities across the region. Durham County Council had applied for funding from the first round of the Department for Transport's New Stations Fund in 2013, but were unsuccessful at that stage.

In September 2016, Durham County Council announced that a new preferred site had been identified at South East View, Horden, and a public consultation was launched, in order to gauge the potential usage of a reopened station. This site is located about 200 yards (180 m) from the original station, significantly closer than the earlier proposal.

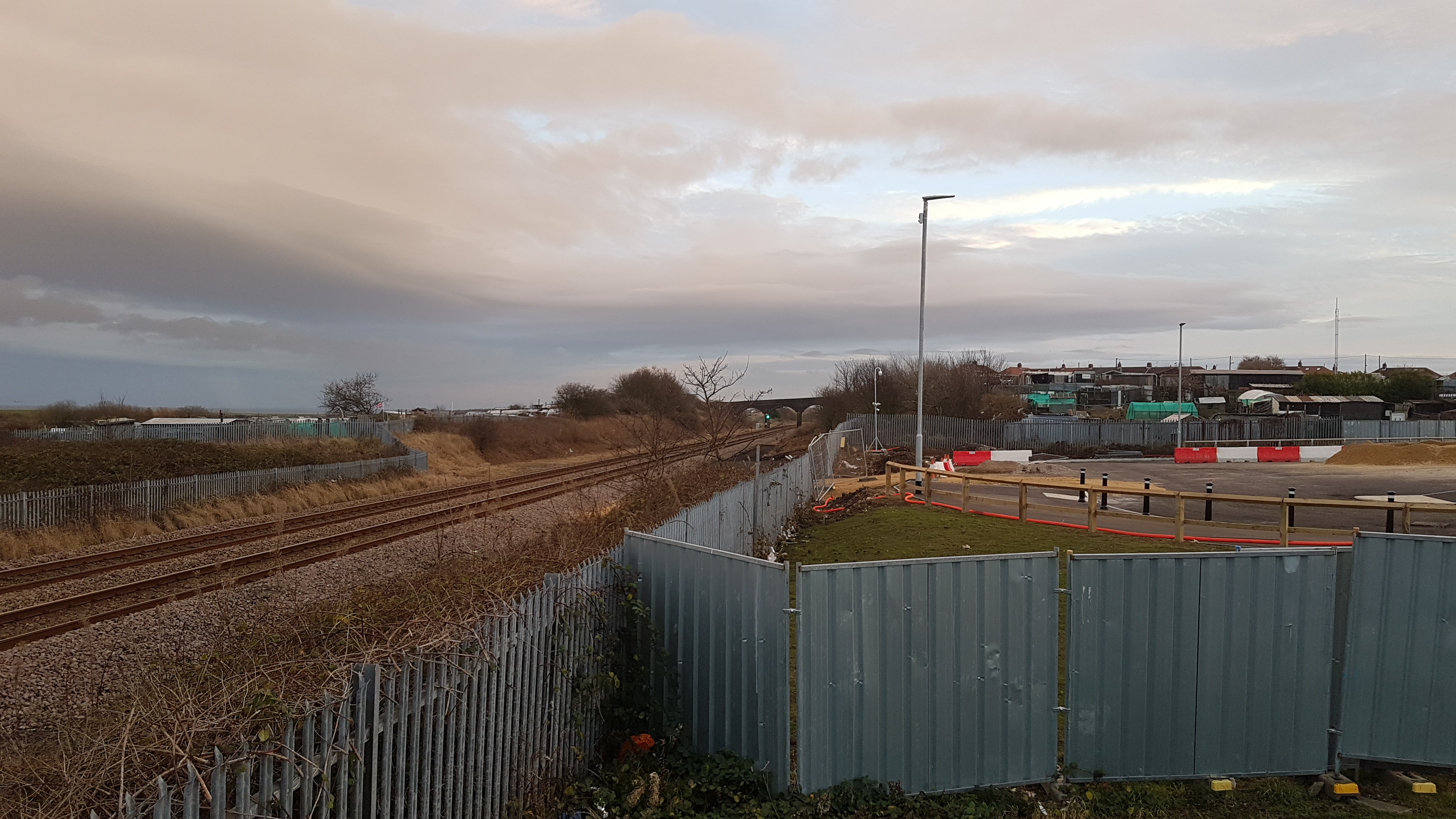
The current station, under construction in December 2019. At this time only the car park had been completed, with construction of the platforms yet to begin.

In July 2017, it was announced that the station would be built with a contribution of £4.4 million in funding from the second round of the New Stations Fund, with the remainder of the scheme's £10.5 million cost being covered by funding which has already been provided by Durham County Council and the North East Combined Authority. Network Rail submitted a planning application for the new station on 1 November 2018, and this was duly approved on 7 January 2019.

The first stage of construction work for this project, involving the creation of the station car park and adjacent bus stop, commenced on 28 May 2019. It was later followed by the construction of the station itself, as well as associated signalling and track realignment works, in the second stage. In late April 2020, having completed both platforms, the station's footbridge and associated ramps and stairs were installed by Story Contracting, using a 500 tonne crane. Following this, work progressed through mechanical, electrical and telecoms works and, finally, interface works between the station and car park.

The station opened on 29 June 2020. It had originally been expected to be open in March 2020, but this was later revised to May 2020. This May 2020 opening date was also missed owing to a requirement to adjust working practices in response to the COVID-19 pandemic.

== Facilities ==
The station has two platforms, both of which have ticket machines, seating, waiting shelters, next train audio and visual displays and an emergency help point in the refuge area on both platforms as well as in the centre. The platforms are linked by an accessible footbridge. There is a car park with 139 spaces, as well as facilities for drop-off, a taxi rank and a bus stop with bus connections to Peterlee.

The station is part of the Northern Trains penalty fare network, meaning that a ticket or "promise to pay" notice is required prior to boarding.

== Services ==
As of the May 2021 timetable change, the station is served by an hourly service between Newcastle and Middlesbrough. Most trains continue to Hexham (or Carlisle on Sunday) and Nunthorpe. Two trains per day (three on Sunday) continue to Whitby. All services are operated by Northern Trains.

Rolling stock used: Class 156 Super Sprinter and Class 158 Express Sprinter

Preceding station	National Rail	Following station
Hartlepool	Northern Trains; Durham Coast Line	Seaham
	Historical railways	
Blackhall Colliery; Line open; station closed	London and North Eastern Railway; Durham Coast Line	Easington; Line open; station closed
