= Dene Holme =

English country house in County Durham

- Location in County Durham

General information
- Location: County Durham, England, UK
- Coordinates: 54.757°N 1.293°W
- OS grid: NZ 45537 40543

Dene Holme, also known as Deneholme, was a country house and hotel in Horden, County Durham, England. It was a half-octagonal house with castellated trimmings. The house is estimated to have been built in the 18th century.

John Watson was tenant of Dene Holme from 1887 to 1902. By 1897, it was a hotel and had a private road connecting it to the nearby Frenchman's Hut. Also constructed was a road by the Blue House Farm to Dene Holme, which was never dedicated to the public. The house and hotel was demolished in the 1970s.
