= Dene Academy =

Location
- Manor Way; Peterlee; County Durham, SR8 5RL; England; 54.7574°N 1.3165°W

Information
- Type: Academy
- Established: April 30, 1962
- Local authority: Durham County Council
- Trust: Advance Learning Partnership
- Department for Education URN: 147122 Tables
- Ofsted: Reports
- Head teacher: David Nelson
- Gender: Coeducational
- Age: 11 to 16
- Website: https://deneacademy.org.uk/

Dene Academy (formerly Dene Community School) is a coeducational secondary school located in Peterlee, County Durham, England.

== History ==
=== Secondary modern school ===
Peterlee Acre Rigg Modern school had opened in September 1958. Peterlee Dean House Modern school was to cost £156,307. Peterlee Grammar-Technical school was to cost £247,390, which became Peterlee Grammar School by 1961, to open in September 1962 as a four form school, as planned by Durham County Education Committee in 1959. By 1960 the school would cost £140,000.

By 1961 the Dene House and Shotton Hall secondary modern schools would be £145,000. The school opened on Monday April 30 1962. It was officially opened on Thursday 27 September 1962 as Dean House Mixed Modern school.

By 1969, it was proposed as a 8-form comprehensive school. A £100,000 extension would add 150 places, to become a four-form school for ages 11-16. It would possibly eventually become a 11-18 comprehensive with around 1,400. A £200,000 construction programme began in May 1972, to make the school a six-form entry comprehensive by September 1974.

=== Comprehensive ===
It was comprehensive from September 1974. In June 1980 the county council decided to close all sixth forms in Peterlee, apart from the catholic school, as only 10% stayed on in sixth form. A new college would be built on the Howletch School, East Durham College, on the former site of Peterlee Grammar School.

In May 1981 it was decided to make the school a six-form entry.

== New building ==
In November 2012 the school relocated to a new building on the same site.

Previously a community school administered by Durham County Council, in September 2019 Dene Community School converted to academy status and was renamed Dene Academy. The school is now sponsored by the Advance Learning Partnership.

== Curriculum ==
Dene Academy offers GCSEs and BTECs as programmes of study for pupils. Most graduating students go on to attend East Durham College.

=== Headteachers ===
- April 1962 Mr Edward V Cable

== Alumni ==
=== Dene House Comprehensive ===
- Gina McKee, known for the series Our Friends in the North in 1996

== Former teachers ==
- David Taylor-Gooby, aged 26 and teaching Social Studies, he was chosen in September 1973 as the Labour candidate for Scarborough (constituency) for the two 1974 general elections. He lived on North View in Ludworth, County Durham. In 1972 he had married Vera Baird, divorcing in 1978. His brother was Peter Taylor-Gooby. He attended Watford Grammar School for Boys and Emmanuel College, Cambridge, and was in the Fabian Society. He moved to Peterlee College, which became the Howletch Centre of East Durham College
