= Horden Colliery =

Coal mine in County Durham, UK

Horden Power Station
- Country: England
- Location: County Durham, North East England
- Coordinates: 54.768288°N 1.314526°W
- Commission date: 1926
- Decommission date: 1987
- Owner: Horden Collieries
- Operator: Durham Collieries Electric Supply Company

Thermal power station
- Primary fuel: Coal

Horden Colliery was a coal mine in Horden, near Peterlee in County Durham, in Northeast England.

== History ==
It opened in 1900 and was closed on 28 February 1987. Initially owned by Horden Collieries Ltd, it was handed over to the National Coal Board in 1947 when the British coal industry was nationalised. On 9 May 1930, the colliery set a European record for the most coal mined by a single colliery in a day, with a total of 6,758 tonnes mined. This record stood for over thirty years. The colliery's peak employment numbers were reached in 1935 when 4,342 people were employed in the colliery.

== Horden power station ==
Horden power station was a coal-fired power station situated in the colliery. The station used a 1,000 kilowatt (kW) turbo alternator, along with four 400 kW rotary converters for DC electrical supply, giving the station a total generating capacity of 2,600 kW. The station provided power for the colliery and the local homes, but has now been demolished, along with the colliery.

== Howden waste heat power station ==
The Howden waste heat power station used gas from the adjacent coke works to generate electricity via steam-driven turbo-alternators. The plant was installed in 1934–35 and comprised:

- 4 × gas-fired Babcock and Wilcox boilers producing 16,000 pounds per hour (2.02 kg/s) of steam at 270 psi at 675 °F (18.6 bar at 357 °C)
- 1 × gas-fired Clarke Chapman boiler, output and conditions as above
- 2 × 3 MW British Thomson-Houston turbo-alternators, generating at 2.75 kV, 3-phase AC
- 2 × Premier cooling towers, with a total capacity of 0.499 million gallons per hour (0.63 m^{3}/s)

The electricity supplied from 1946 to 1958 is shown in the table.

| Year | Net capability, MW | Electricity supplied, GWh | Running hours | Plant load, % |
|---|---|---|---|---|
| 1946 | 4.3 | 28.421 | | 75.5 |
| 1947 | 4.6 | 29.784 | | 73.9 |
| 1948 | 6 | 33.374 | 8672 | 64.1 |
| 1950 | 6 | 34.737 | 8749 | 66.1 |
| 1954 | 6 | 34.655 | 8758 | 65.9 |
| 1955 | 6 | 32.215 | 8760 | 61.3 |
| 1956 | 6 | 35.771 | 8784 | 67.9 |
| 1957 | 6 | 34.827 | 8760 | 66.3 |
| 1958 | 6 | 32.404 | 8758 | 61.7 |

The plant had been decommissioned by 1971.

== Red Hill ==
Tony Parker wrote a book about Horden and the people of Horden Colliery and anonymized it as Red Hill: A Mining Community.

U2 wrote a song about the book called "Red Hill Mining Town".

== See also ==
- Horden Colliery Welfare A.F.C.
