= A179 road =

Road in England

A179

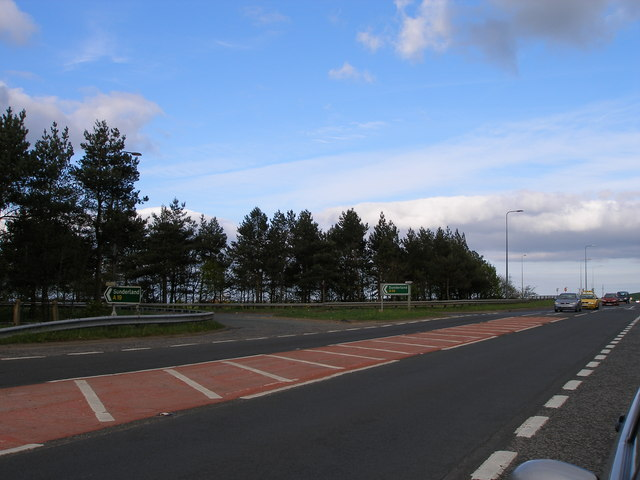

Major junctions
- From: A19, Sheraton
- A178 A689 A1048 A1049 A1086; A19
- To: A689, Hartlepool

Location
- Country: United Kingdom

Road network
- Roads in the United Kingdom; Motorways; A and B road zones

The A179 is the major link road between the A19 and Hartlepool via Hart Village.
