= Dene (valley) =

Former common name for a valley

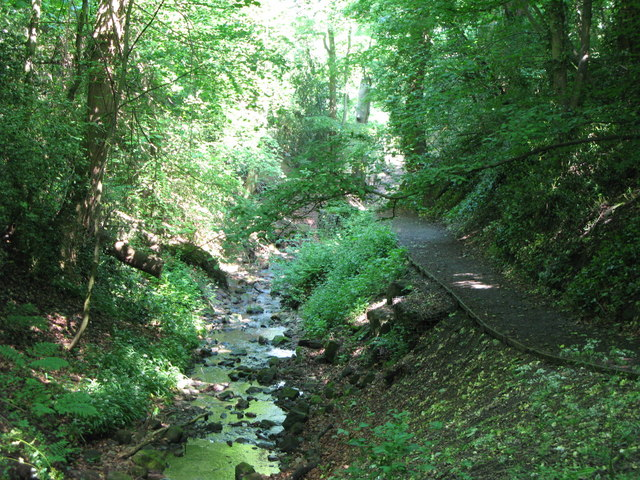
The dene of Halgut Burn

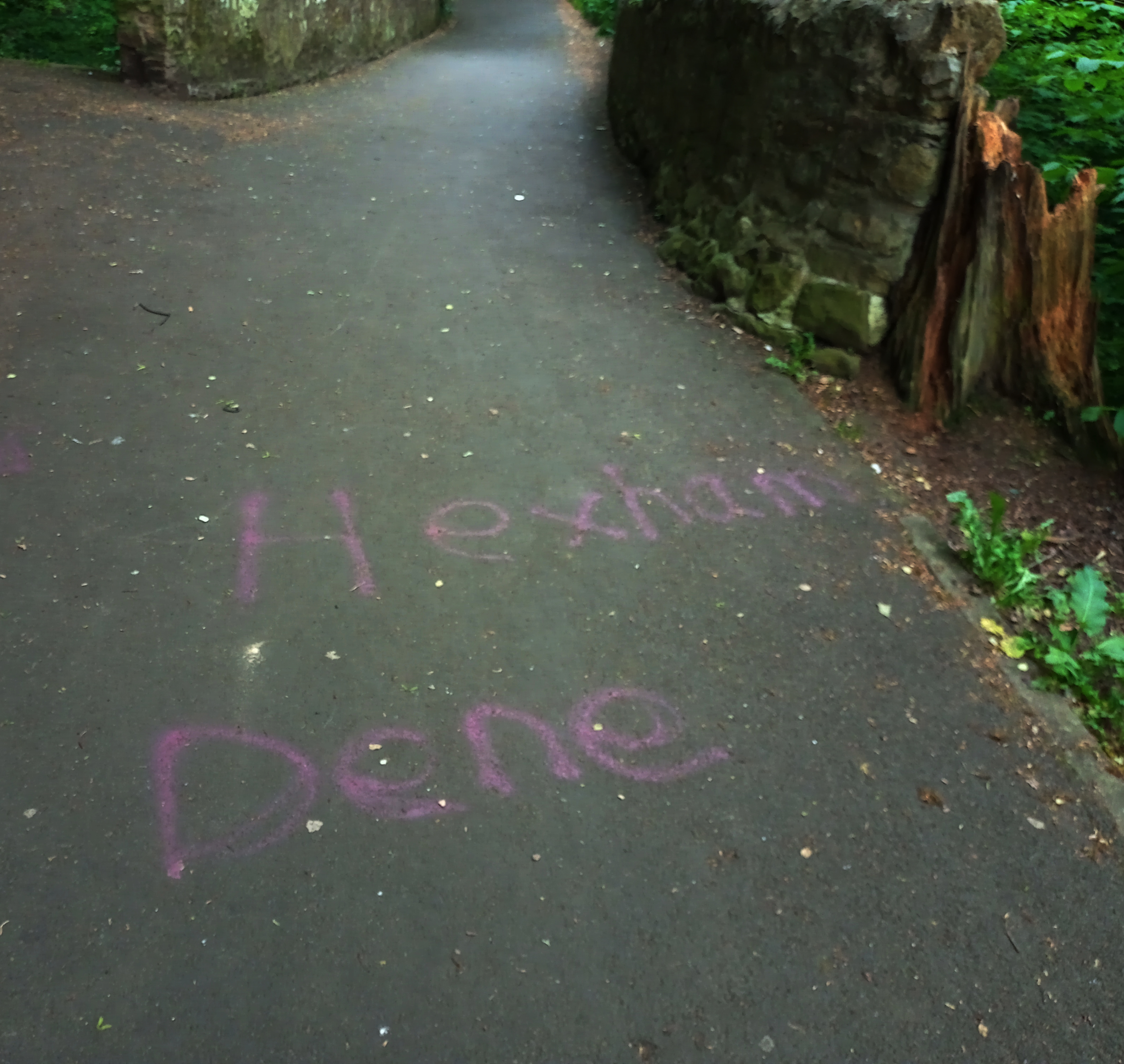
"Dene" as a living word in Northumbria: here used constructively to coin a novel toponym for Halgut Dene

A dene or dean (Old English: denu) used to be a common name for a valley, in which sense it is frequently found as a component of British place-names, such as Rottingdean and Ovingdean in England, and Hassendean and the Dean Village in Scotland.

It is a cognate of den, from the Old English denn, a cave or "lurking place".

A steep-sided wooded valley through which a burn runs, the word still survives in the Northumbrian dialect as dene in the English counties of Durham and Northumberland, and dean in the Scottish Lowlands. Many of the incised valleys cut by small streams that flow off the Durham and Northumberland plateau into the North Sea are given the name Dene, as in Castle Eden Dene and Crimdon Dene in County Durham and Jesmond Dene in Tyne and Wear.
