= Blackhall Colliery =

Village in County Durham, England

Coordinates: 54.746093°N 1.288406°W

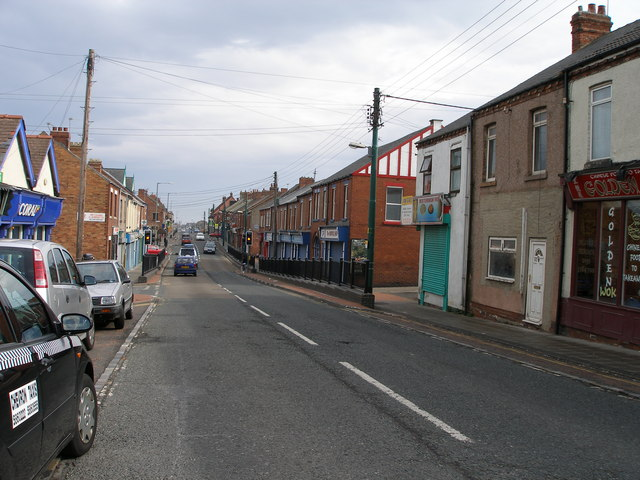
- Main street at Blackhall Colliery

- Location within County Durham
- Civil parish: Monk Hesleden
- Unitary authority: County Durham
- Ceremonial county: County Durham
- Region: North East
- Country: England
- Sovereign state: United Kingdom
- Post town: Hartlepool
- Postcode district: TS27
- Dialling code: 0191
- Police: Durham
- Fire: County Durham and Darlington
- Ambulance: North East
- UK Parliament: Easington

Blackhall Colliery is a village on the North Sea coast of County Durham, in England. It is situated on the A1086 between Horden and Hartlepool. To the south of the Blackhall Colliery's Catholic church is Blackhall Rocks.

Built around the once extensive mining industry, Blackhall's colliery closed in 1981. Daniel Hall was one of the founding fathers of the colliery and invested heavily in the establishment of the mining infrastructure in the area. It is believed but yet unconfirmed that the name Black-Hall was established as a result of Daniels alias 'Black' due to his association with the mining of coal and his surname Hall. In 1991 a local campaign to erect a statue of Mr Hall was unsuccessful due to a lack of available funding from the local Authority. There is now an industrial estate built over part of the old colliery buildings, the colliery itself was pulled down in the 1980s. Blackhall Colliery is on the edge of Castle Eden Dene, and Castle Eden Dene Mouth.

Over the past couple of decades, there have been many changes. Following the closure of the colliery, the once busy village has economically gone downhill. As time has passed since the closure, other industries have now begun to emerge to once again create employment in the region.

With both Blackhall Colliery and Blackhall Rocks being on the main road to Peterlee and Hartlepool. This has meant that these villages have become commuter villages, supplying workers for the now busy and expanding call centres in the nearby towns of Hartlepool and Peterlee.

== Blackhall beach ==
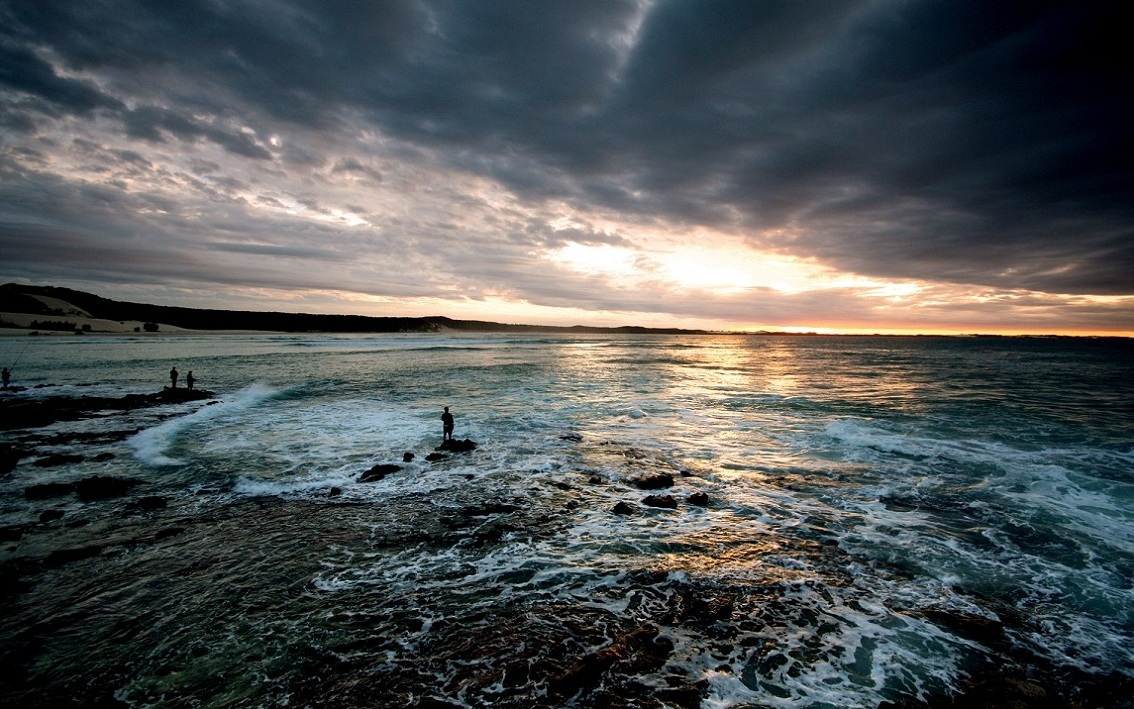
Blackhall Colliery Beach 2010

Blackhall beach made a notable appearance in the 1971 film Get Carter; in the climactic scenes the main character is involved in a chase across a coal-strewn beach. The film shows the beach black with coal spoilings, dumped there by mine's conveyor system. Since the mine closed, £10 million has been spent removing the conveyor and its massive concrete tower and cleaning tons of coal waste from the beach, which is now pristine.

Neighbouring beaches of Blackhall Colliery is a narrow strip of Peterlee then Horden beach (North) and Crimdon beach (South), both are within 30 minutes of walking distance each way from the beach. The continuation of the improving regenerative beach can be seen via the coastline.

== Photo gallery ==
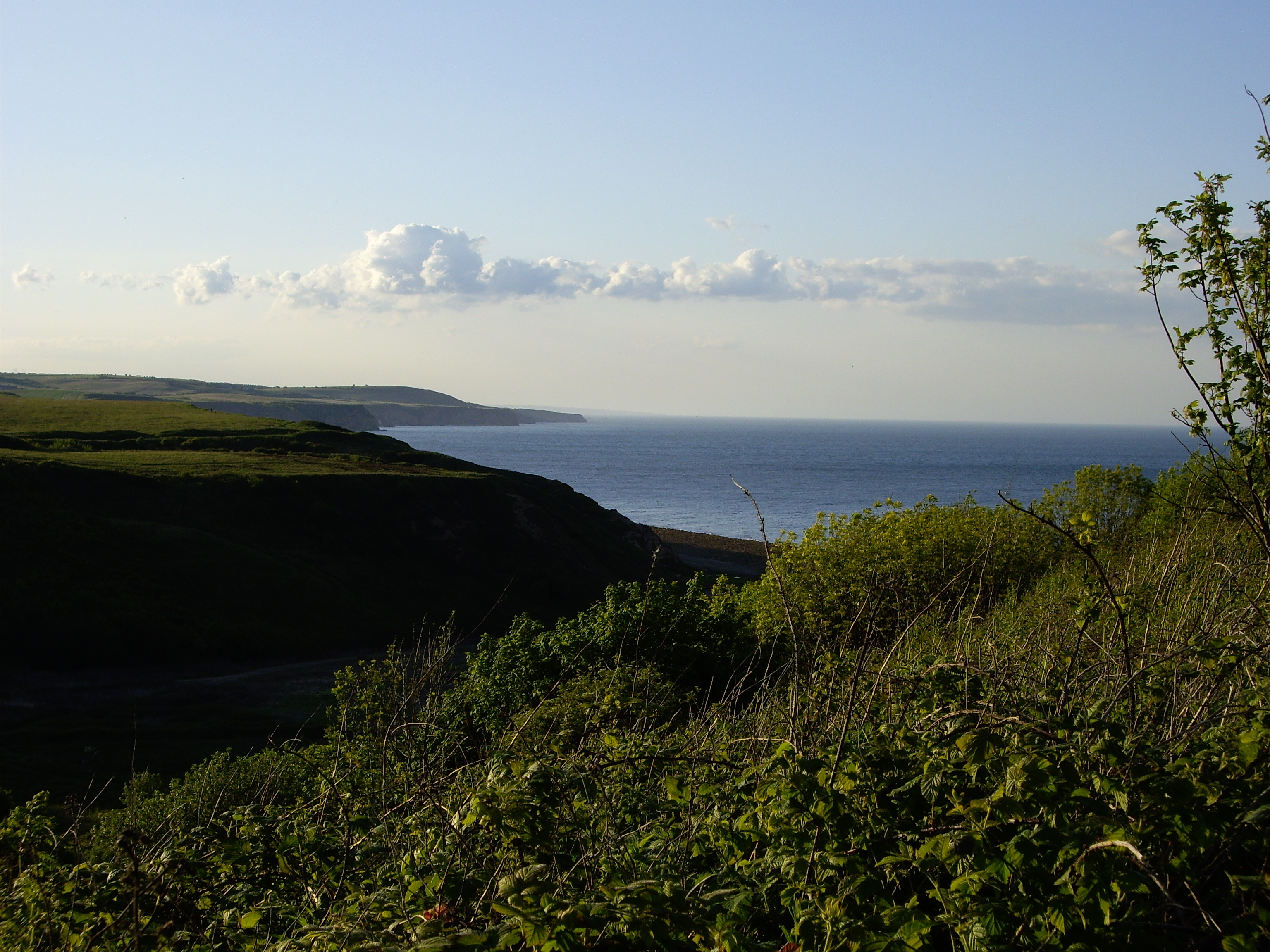
Looking north from Blackhall

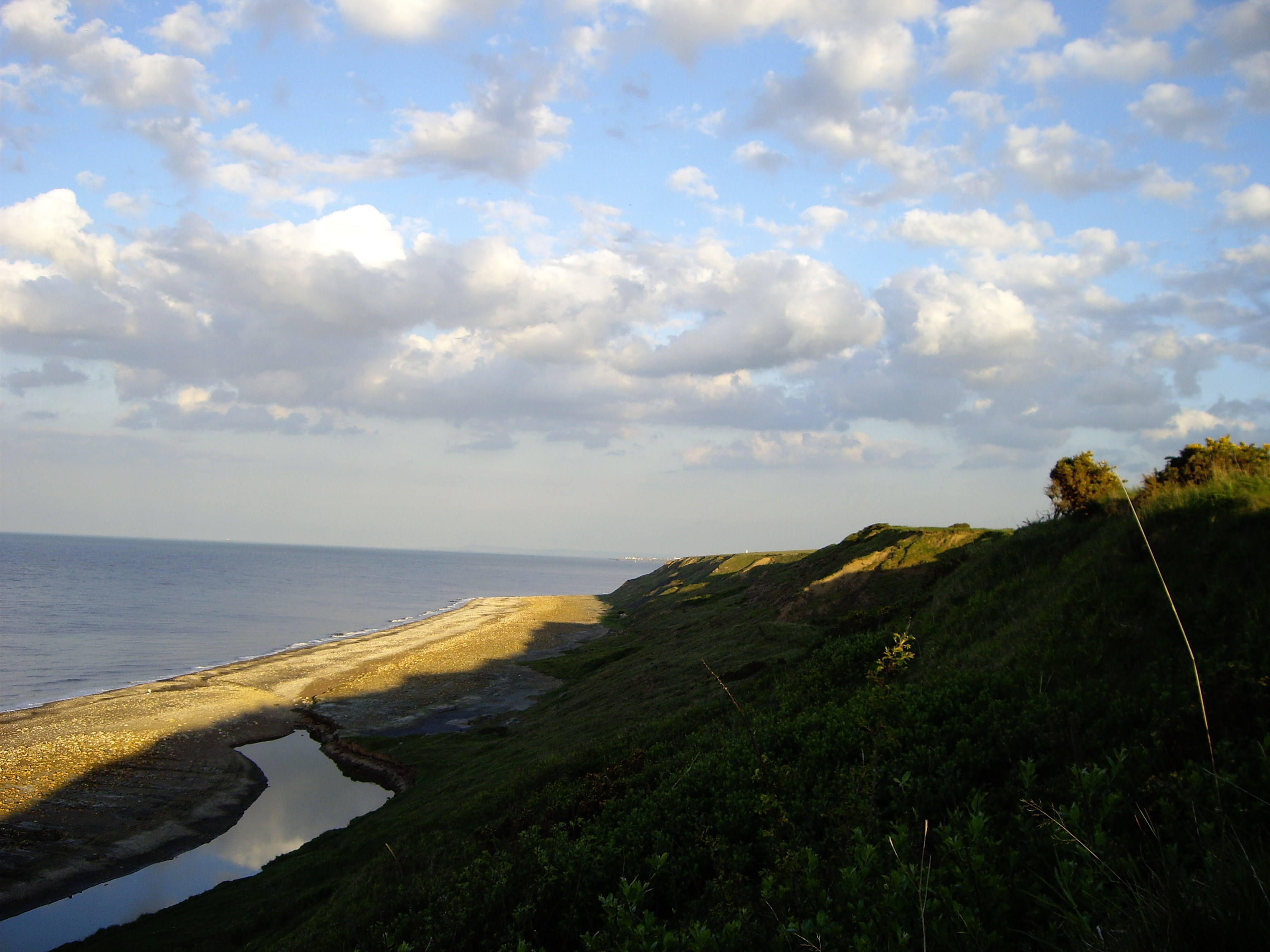
Facing Seaton and Hartlepool

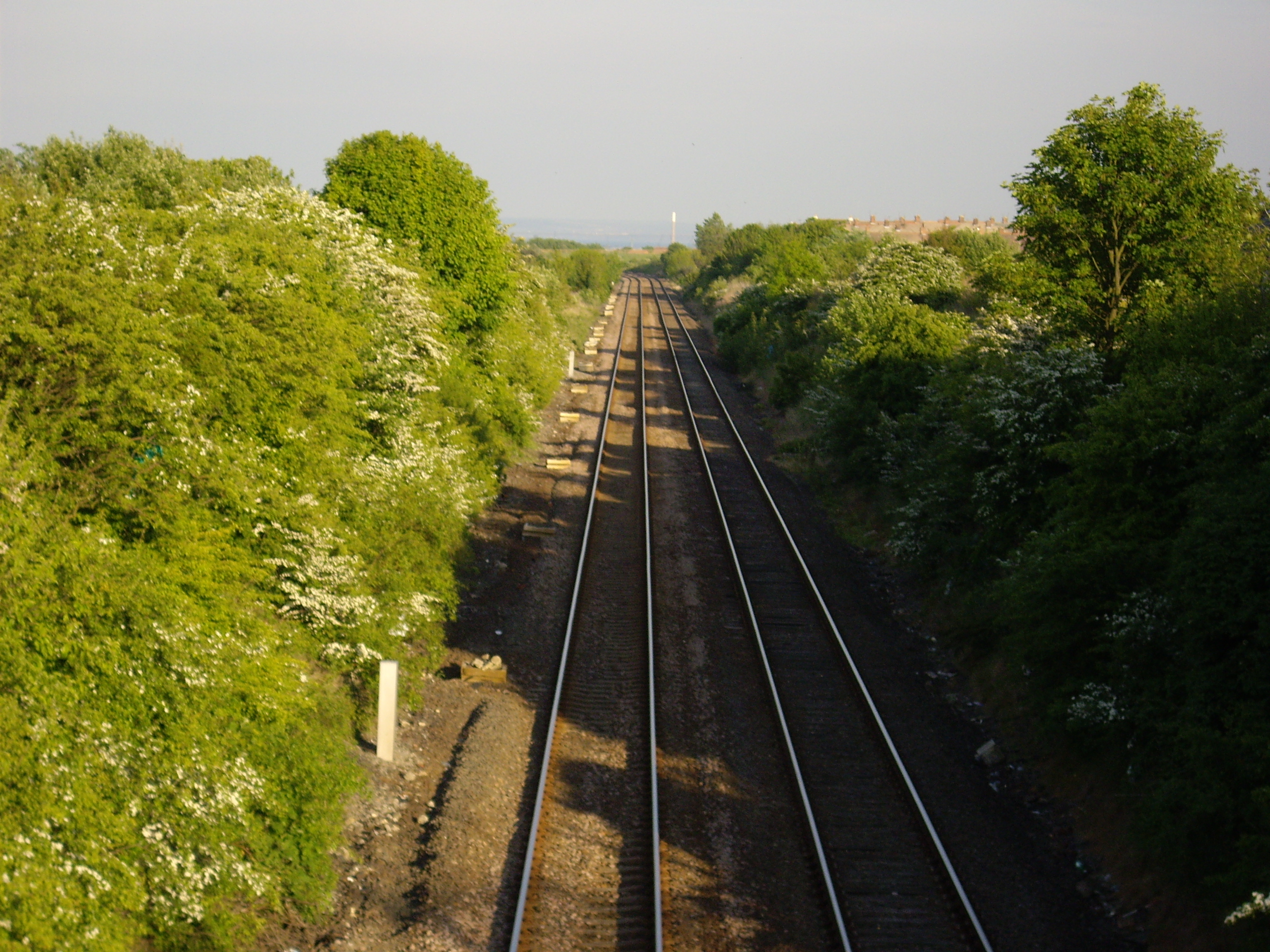
Standing on top of Blackhall bridge facing towards Hartlepool

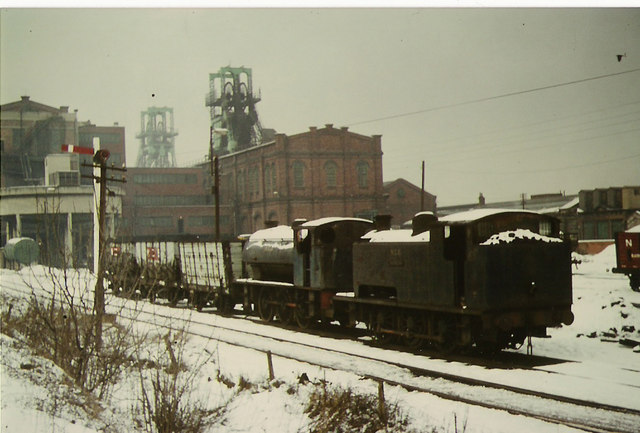
Blackhall colliery, 1970

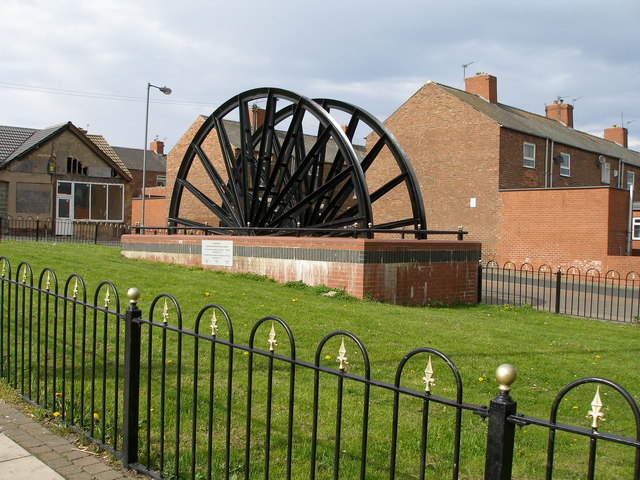
Monument to the mining industry at Blackhall Colliery

== See also ==
- Blackhall Colliery Welfare F.C.
- Blackhall Colliery railway station
