= St Bede's Catholic School, Peterlee =

St. Bede's Catholic School

Location
- Westway; Peterlee, County Durham, SR8 1DE; England; 54°45′29″N 1°20′46″W

Information
- Type: Academy
- Religious affiliation: Roman Catholic
- Established: 1970
- Local authority: Durham County Council
- Trust: Bishop Chadwick Catholic Education Trust
- Department for Education URN: 148304 Tables
- Ofsted: Reports
- Gender: Coeducational
- Age: 11 to 18
- Website: http://www.st-bedes.durham.sch.uk/

St Bede's Catholic School is a coeducational Roman Catholic secondary school and sixth form located in Peterlee, County Durham, England.

== History ==
The school was officially opened in 1970 by Bishop Hugh Lindsay, but actually opened for staff and pupils in September 1969. Then only the first-year students, born in 1957-58, were a truly non-selective 'comprehensive' intake. These were the first Catholic pupils in the area not to sit the 11-plus examination. Second-year and upwards pupils were all pupils who had 'failed' the 11-plus and were thus taken from the various Catholic secondary modern schools in the area that had been closed and replaced by the new institution.

Meanwhile, those older students who had passed their 11-plus in 1968 and earlier years continued to be educated at the St Francis RC Grammar School(boys) and at the Convent (girls) at Hartlepool. When those schools closed in 1973, some of these pupils finally arrived at St Bede's as sixth-formers. The school was thus effectively a secondary modern for the first few years of its life.

The school's founding head teacher was D Mylroi, a former teacher at St Francis. The first Deputy Headmaster was Cunningham.

The school was organised on a 'house' system. Originally there were four of these, each named after the first bishops of Hexham and Newcastle: Hogarth, Chadwick, Bewick and O'Callaghan. Members of each house were supposed to wear braiding on their green uniform blazers to denote which houses they belonged to. Hogarth was red; Chadwick was yellow; Bewick was blue; and O'Callaghan was green. 4 more houses, Wilkinson, Collins, Thorman and McCormack were added later.

Each house had its own dining hall where the housemasters conducted morning assemblies. Only very rarely, such as at the belated 'official' opening of the school in 1970, did the entire school assemble together.

In the early years, most pupils left school as soon as they could, which in those days was at 15. 1972 was the last year that pupils were able to leave school at 15 (that is, at the end of the fourth year) and it was only after this date that appreciable numbers stayed on into the sixth form. Indeed, in the early years, even the fifth form was very small.

A new purpose-built sixth-form block was opened in September 1973. In September 1974, true comprehensive school status was achieved when some of the first-year intake of 1969 entered the Sixth Form.

Corporal punishment, in the form of caning, was used in the early years of the school, but only the housemasters and headmistress were allowed to administer it.

In summer 2006 it achieved its best-ever GCSE exam results. The school then gained specialist Humanities College status.

The school was rebuilt in 2010 and in 2017 the school was graded as 'Good' by Ofsted inspectors.

Previously a voluntary aided school administered by Durham County Council, in January 2021 St Bede's Catholic School converted to academy status. The school is now sponsored by the Bishop Chadwick Catholic Education Trust.
