= A1086 road =

Road in England

A1086

Route information
- Length: 7.7 mi (12.4 km)

Major junctions
- North end: A19, Easington
- A19 A179
- South end: A179, Hartlepool

Location
- Country: United Kingdom
- Constituent country: England

Road network
- Roads in the United Kingdom; Motorways; A and B road zones

The A1086 is a road in County Durham, north-east England.

The route of the A1086 starts from the A19 junction in Easington and runs to the A179 junction in Hartlepool via Peterlee, Horden, Blackhall Colliery, Blackhall Rocks, Crimdon and Hart Station. It is known locally as the Coast Road. The road is used as a route between Peterlee and Hartlepool for buses and local traffic. It is also used as an alternative route for the A19 and A179.

== Description ==
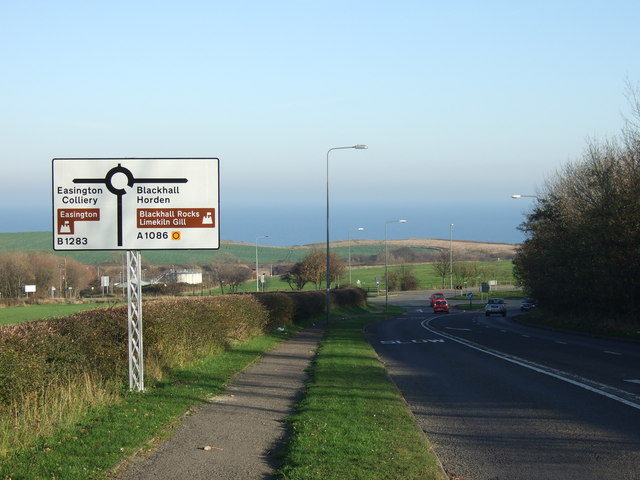
The A1086, heading east

The A1086 is mostly a dangerous route between Horden and Blackhall Colliery and between Crimdon and Hart Station as the road runs through wooded areas with Castle Eden Dene between Horden and Blackhall Colliery and Crimdon Dene between Crimdon and Hart Station. The road has a 30 miles per hour speed limit in built-up areas and a 40 miles per hour speed limit for other areas apart from between Crimdon and Hart Station where the road has the national speed limit of 60 miles per hour, several people have died and suffered serious injuries through drivers exceeding this. During the 1990s there were signs along the road saying about the number of deaths and injuries on the A1086.

== Landslip ==
In 2013, a landslip between Blackhall and Horden closed the northbound lane of the A1086 due to heavy rainstorms. The road was on the verge of a 30-metre drop into the dene below. The northbound lane was closed until the repairs to the embankment were completed in early summer 2015 after over a year of disruption.
