= Blackhall Rocks =

Village in County Durham, England

Coordinates: 54.739°N 1.279°W

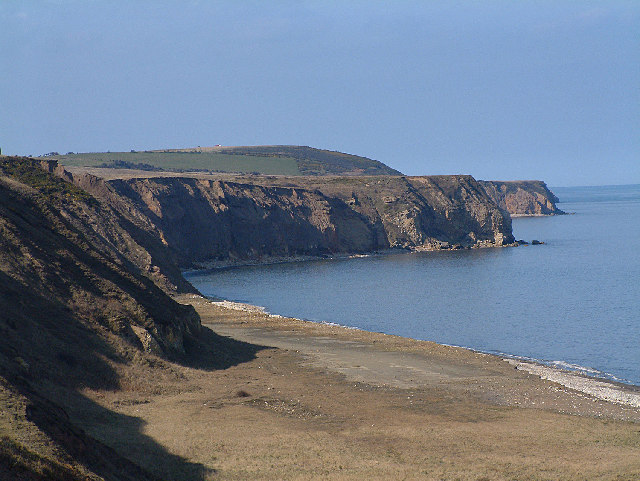
- Cliffs near Blackhall Rocks

- Location within County Durham
- OS grid reference: NZ465385
- Civil parish: Monk Hesleden
- Unitary authority: County Durham
- Ceremonial county: County Durham
- Region: North East
- Country: England
- Sovereign state: United Kingdom
- Post town: HARTLEPOOL
- Postcode district: TS27
- Dialling code: 0191
- Police: Durham
- Fire: County Durham and Darlington
- Ambulance: North East

Blackhall Rocks is a village on the North Sea coast of County Durham, North East England. It is situated on the A1086 between Horden and Hartlepool, and just south of Blackhall Colliery which it adjoins. It is sometimes referred to colloquially as "The Rocks".

One of the earliest testaments to Blackhall Rocks is an Ordnance Survey taken of the Durham area from 1855-1857, where it is referred to as "Black Halls Rocks". The area was the site of the eponymously named Blackhall Rocks Hotel, a Temperance Hotel. The Hotel was converted into temporary accommodation by Easington (district) Council the 1940's, and was eventually demolished in the 1960s. In 1907, Blackhall Rocks railway station opened, primarily serving tourists wishing to visit the cave formations present along the coast of Blackhall Rocks. Adjacent to the station, a siding and coal depot supplied coal from Blackhall Colliery 1 mile north to the surrounding area. On 4 January 1960, the station was closed to passengers, and on 7 December 1964, closed indefinitely.

Beginning in the 1920's, the population of Blackhall Rocks began to rise as nearby coal mining operations grew. In the late 1930s, the local council built a large council estate to the west of the coast road, around the road to High Hesleden. In the 1960s and 1970s, a series of new council houses were built to the east, between the coast road and the railway line.
