= Castle Eden Dene =

Protected area in County Durham, England

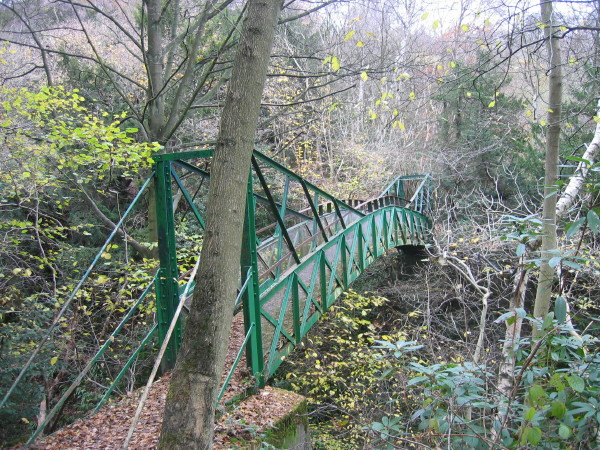
- Gunners Pool Bridge in Castle Eden Dene

- Location within County Durham
- Location: MAGiC MaP
- Nearest town: Peterlee
- Coordinates: 54°45′0″N 1°19′35″W
- Area: 192.97 ha (476.8 acres)
- Established: 1984 (SSSI)
- Governing body: Natural England
- Website: Castle Eden Dene SSSI

Castle Eden Dene is a Site of Special Scientific Interest and National Nature Reserve in the Easington district of County Durham, England. It is located mostly in Peterlee, between the A19 and A1086 roads.

The dene is the largest, and biologically the richest, of a series of deep ravines that have been incised through the Magnesian Limestone and overlying boulder clay of coastal Durham by streams flowing into the North Sea. It is the largest area of semi-natural woodland in north-east England and, because the steep valley sides are mostly inaccessible, it has suffered relatively little from human interference.

The majority of the woodland is dominated by ash, Fraxinus excelsior, and wych elm, Ulmus glabra, though sycamore, Acer pseudoplatanus is well-established and yew, Taxus baccata, is common.

The yew is said to have given the dene its name, "Eden" being derived from the earlier "Yoden", or Yew dene, though an alternative explanation is that "Eden" and "Yoden" derive from Old English Idun, itself a derivative of Indo-European pid, meaning "a spring, water".

Over 450 species of plants have been recorded in the wood, many of which are typical of ancient woodlands that date back to pre-medieval times. The ground-flora is dominated by ramsons, or wild garlic, Allium ursinum, with its characteristic garlic-like aroma; dog's mercury, Mercurialis perennis and sanicle, Sanicula europaea, are also common, while locally-rare species include lily-of-the-valley, Convallaria majalis, herb paris, Paris quadrifolia, bird's-nest orchid, Neottia nidus-avis, and round-leaved wintergreen, Pyrola rotundifolia.

In early spring, the woodland floor is scattered with the yellow flowers of primrose, Primula vulgaris, lesser celandine, Ranunculus ficaria, wild garlic Allium ursinum (producing the distinctive smell of garlic in the air when flowering) and the white flowers of wood anemone, Anemone nemorosa, which give way in late spring to thick carpets of bluebells, Hyacinthoides non-scripta.

The Dene is a popular venue for walkers and there are several entrances, from Peterlee and Horden to the north, Castle Eden, Blackhall and Heselden to the south, and from the A19 and A1086 roads. Natural England, which manages the area in partnership with local councils, has done much to improve access within the dene, both by strengthening the paths and bridges across the burn and by creating better drainage around the paths. Despite this, heavy rain storms can severely disrupt access to some areas. Storms in July 2009 and November 2012 have left several areas inaccessible and some stretches of path may have to be closed permanently because of the instability of the valley slopes. Similarly, although Castle Eden Burn is seasonal, and there is often no running water at the bottom of the ravine, the culvert which carries the burn under the A1086 road can become blocked with logs after heavy rain storms.

To minimise accidents and to avoid damage to the plants and the dene itself, Natural England advises walkers not to stray from the paths and prohibits the use of bicycles and motorbikes within the reserve.

== Pictures ==
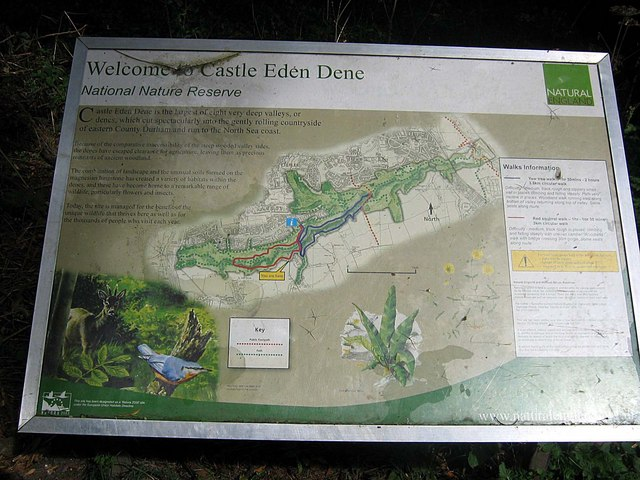
Information board at entrance to Castle Eden Dene

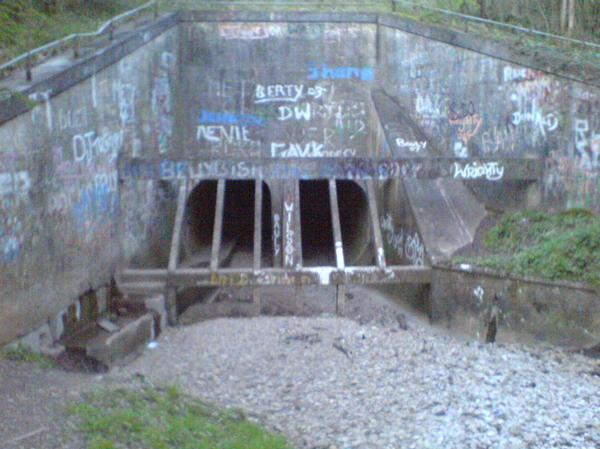
The culvert under the A1086 road carrying the burn and the main footpath linking Castle Eden Dene to the beach at Denemouth

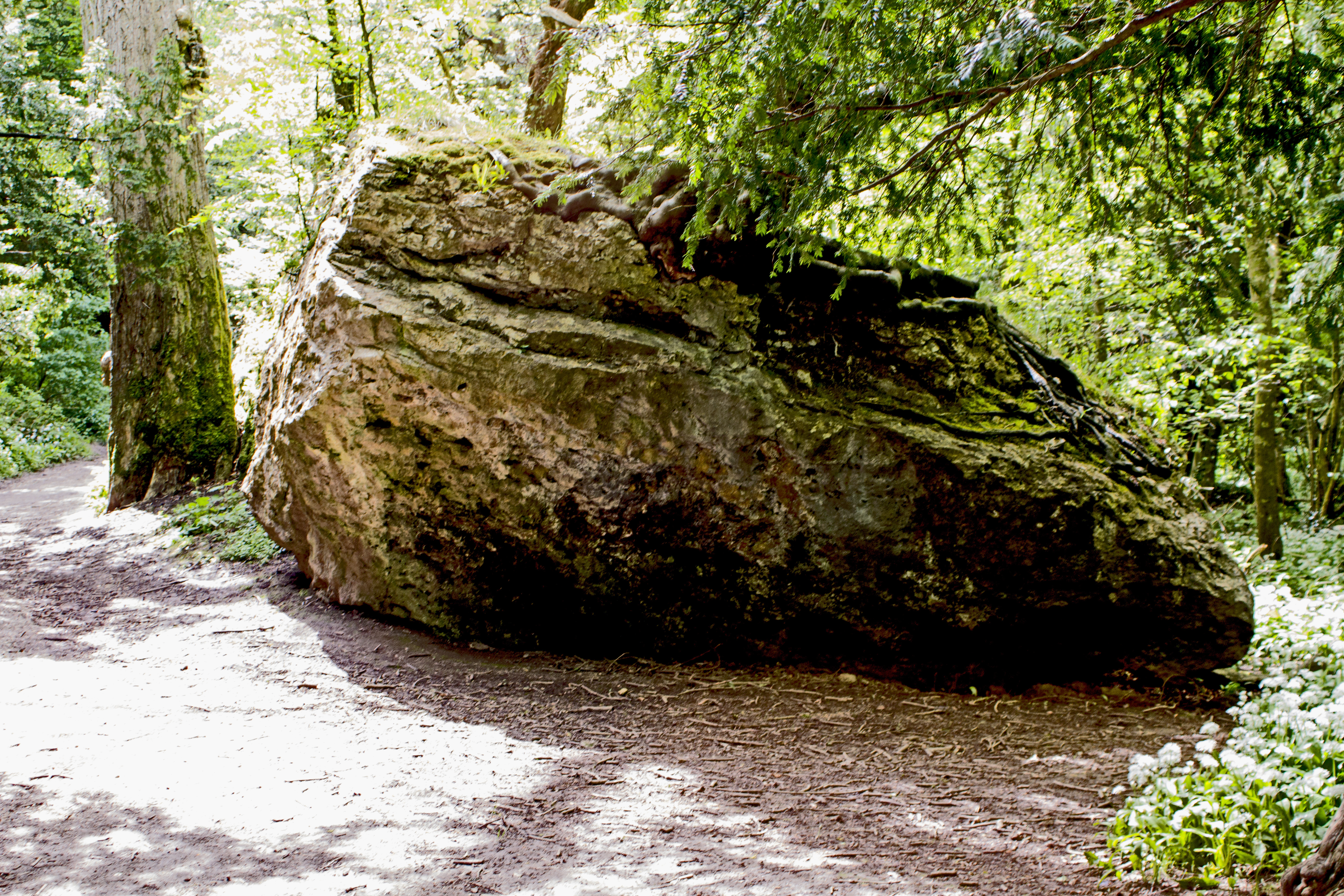
Devils lap stone

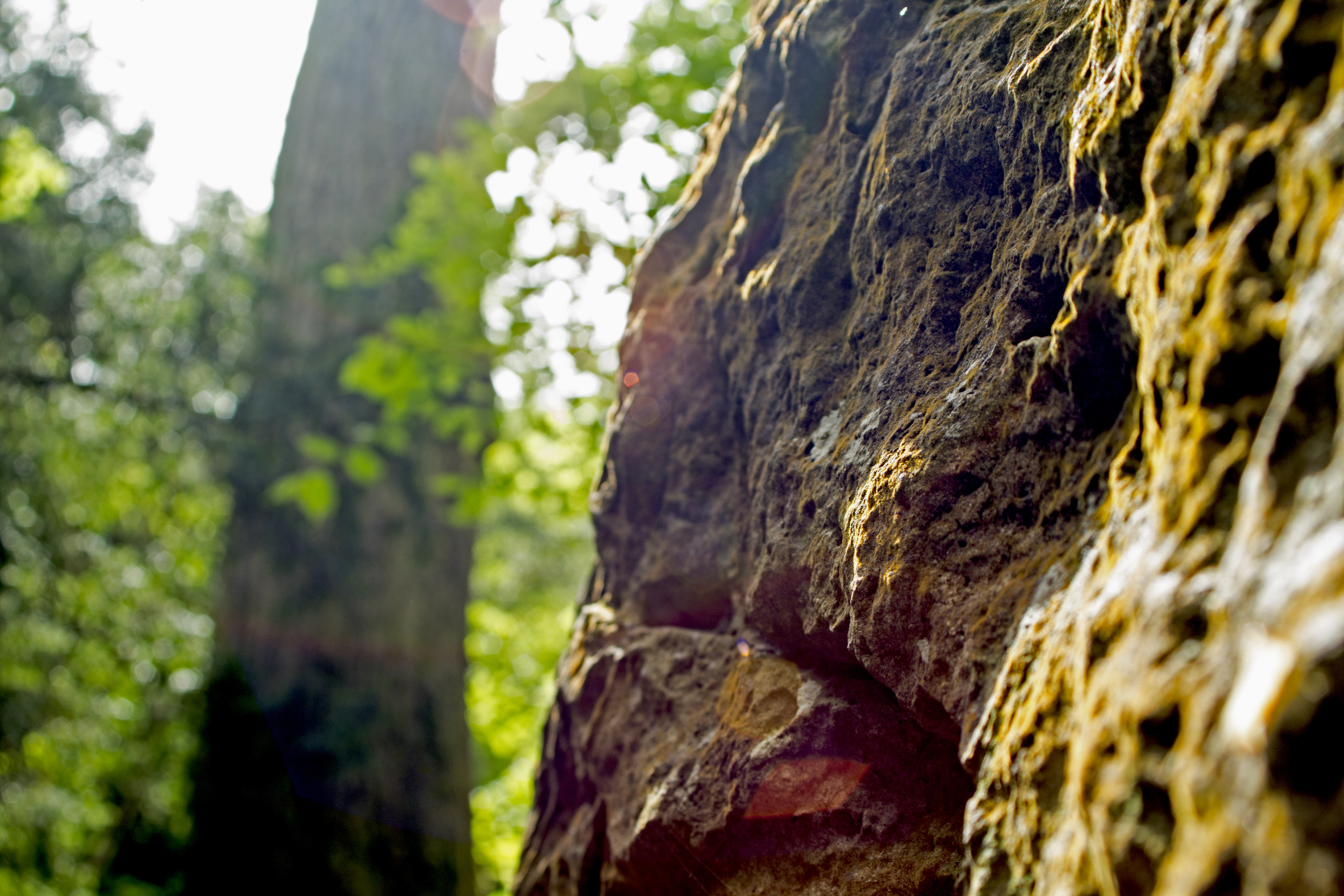
Devils Lap Stone Close up Showing "Claw marks"

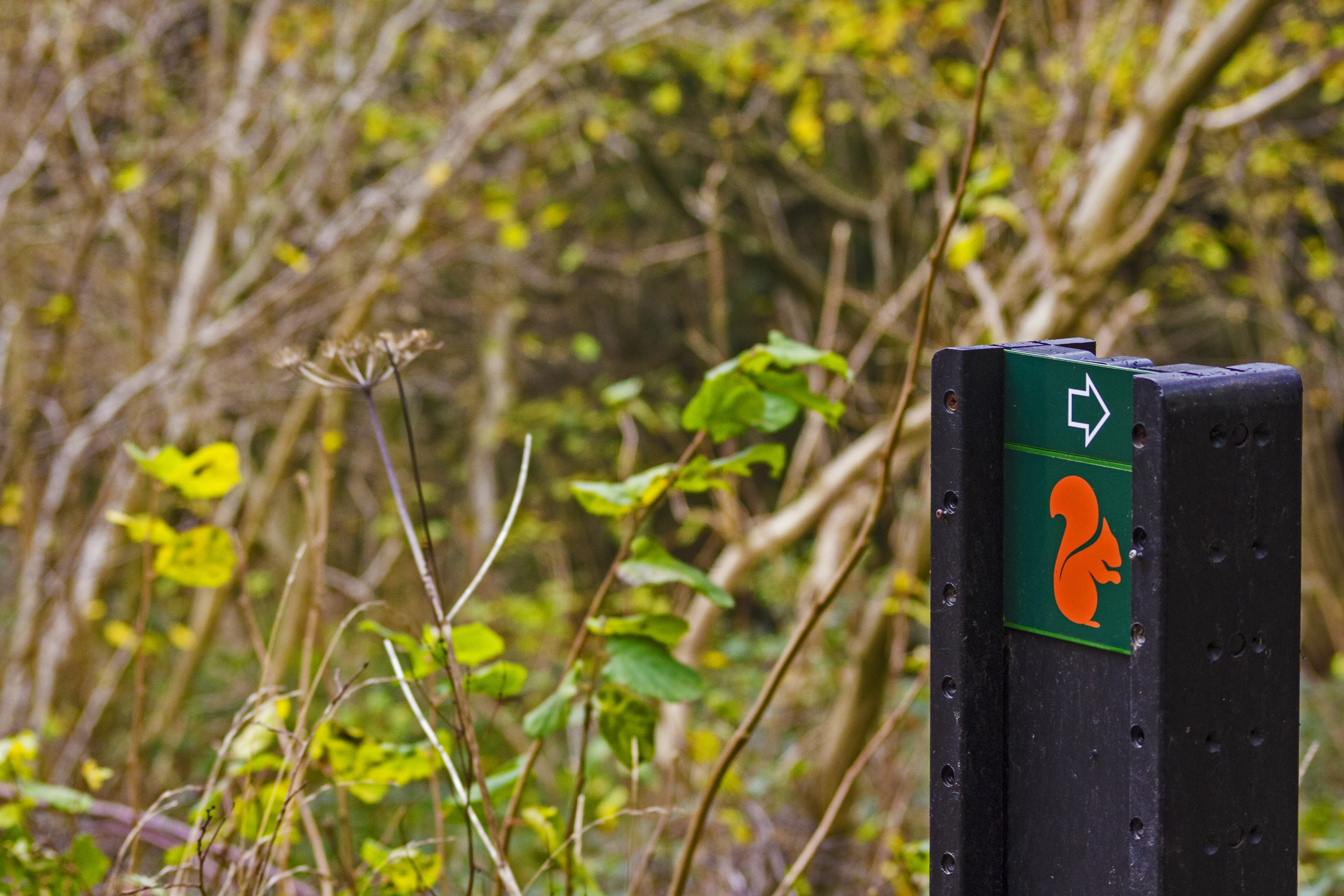
Squirrel trail sign Castle Eden Dene Nation Nature Reserve

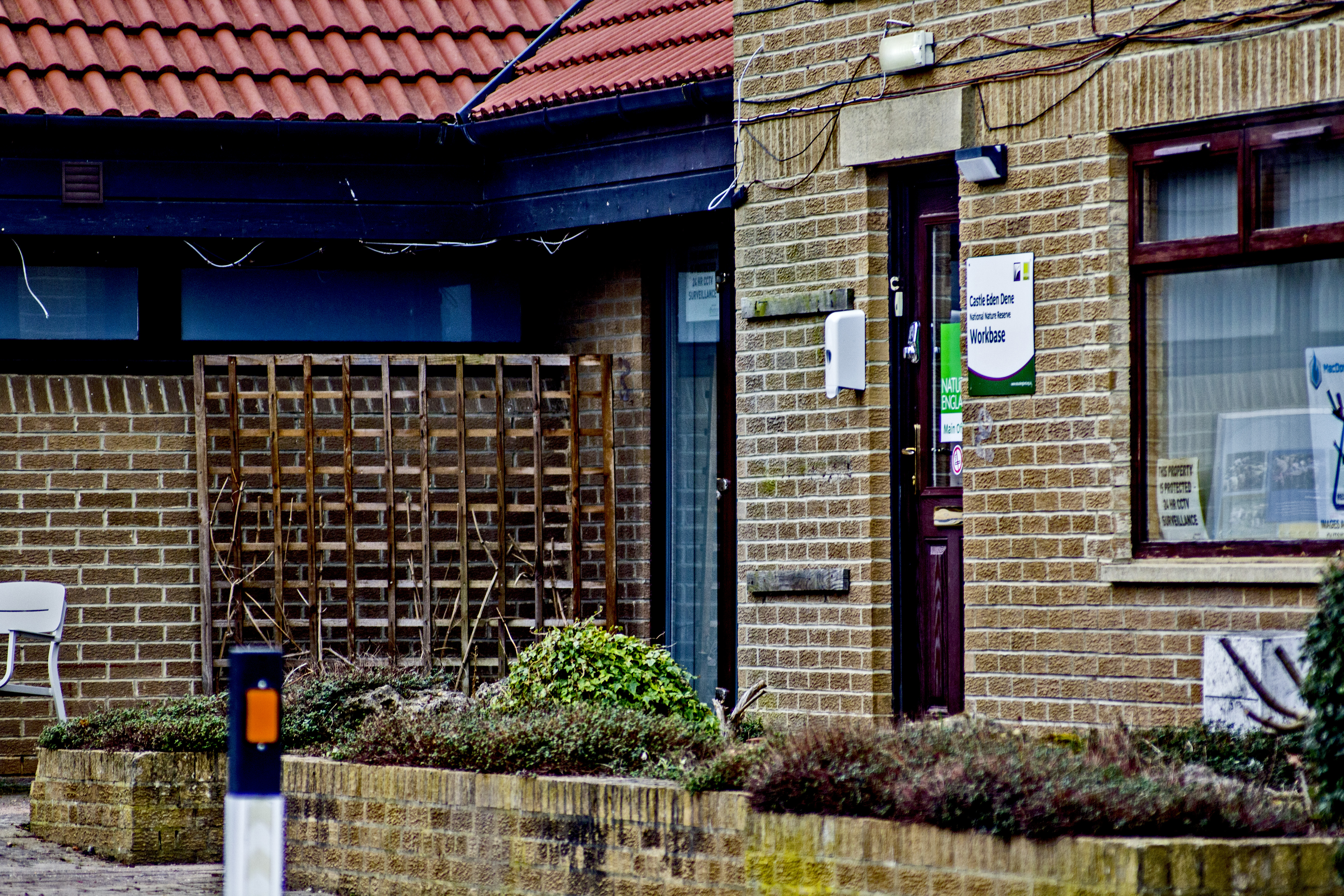
Natural England offices Castle Eden Dene Nation Nature Reserve

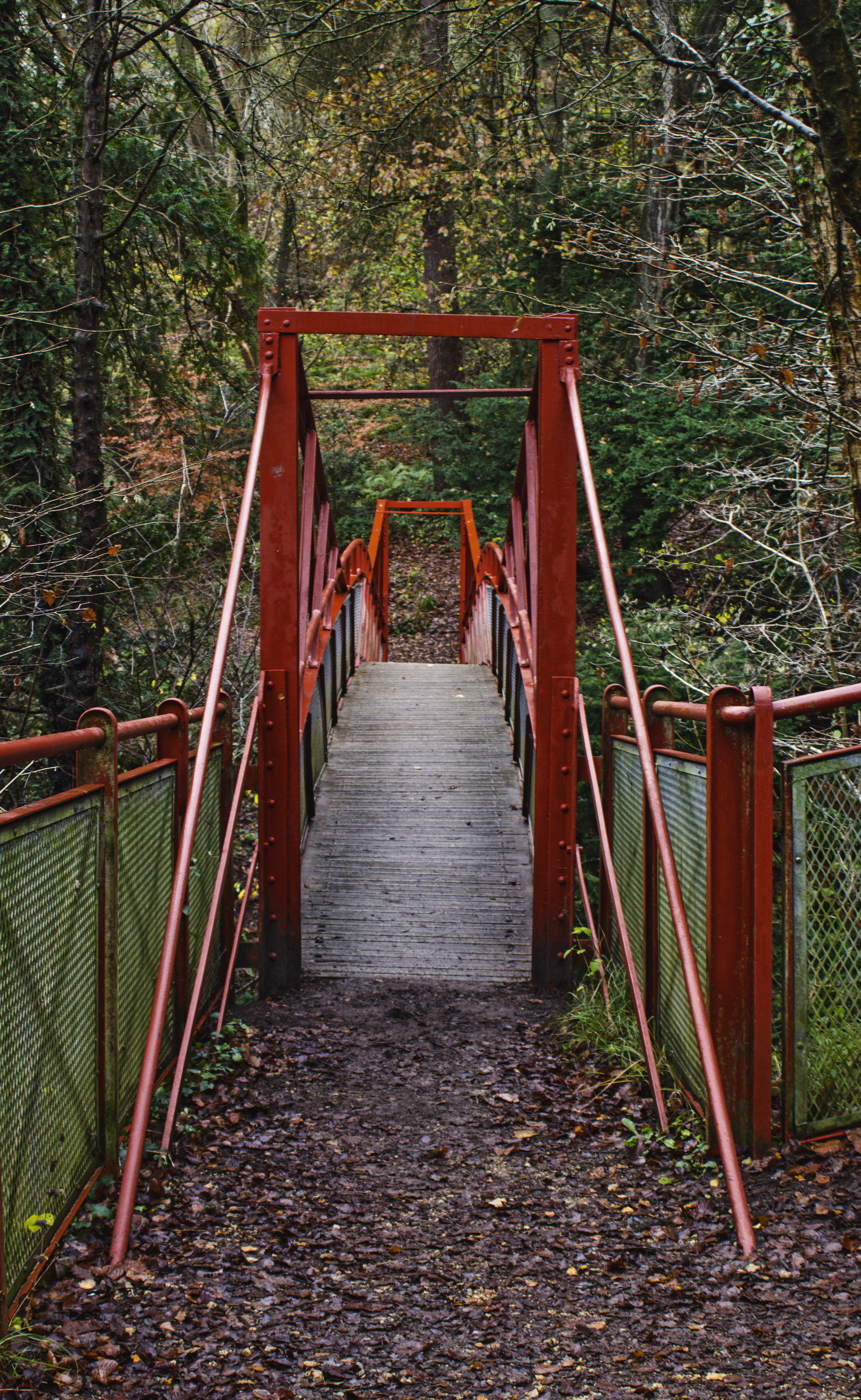
Gunners bridge entranceway Castle Eden Dene Nation Nature Reserve

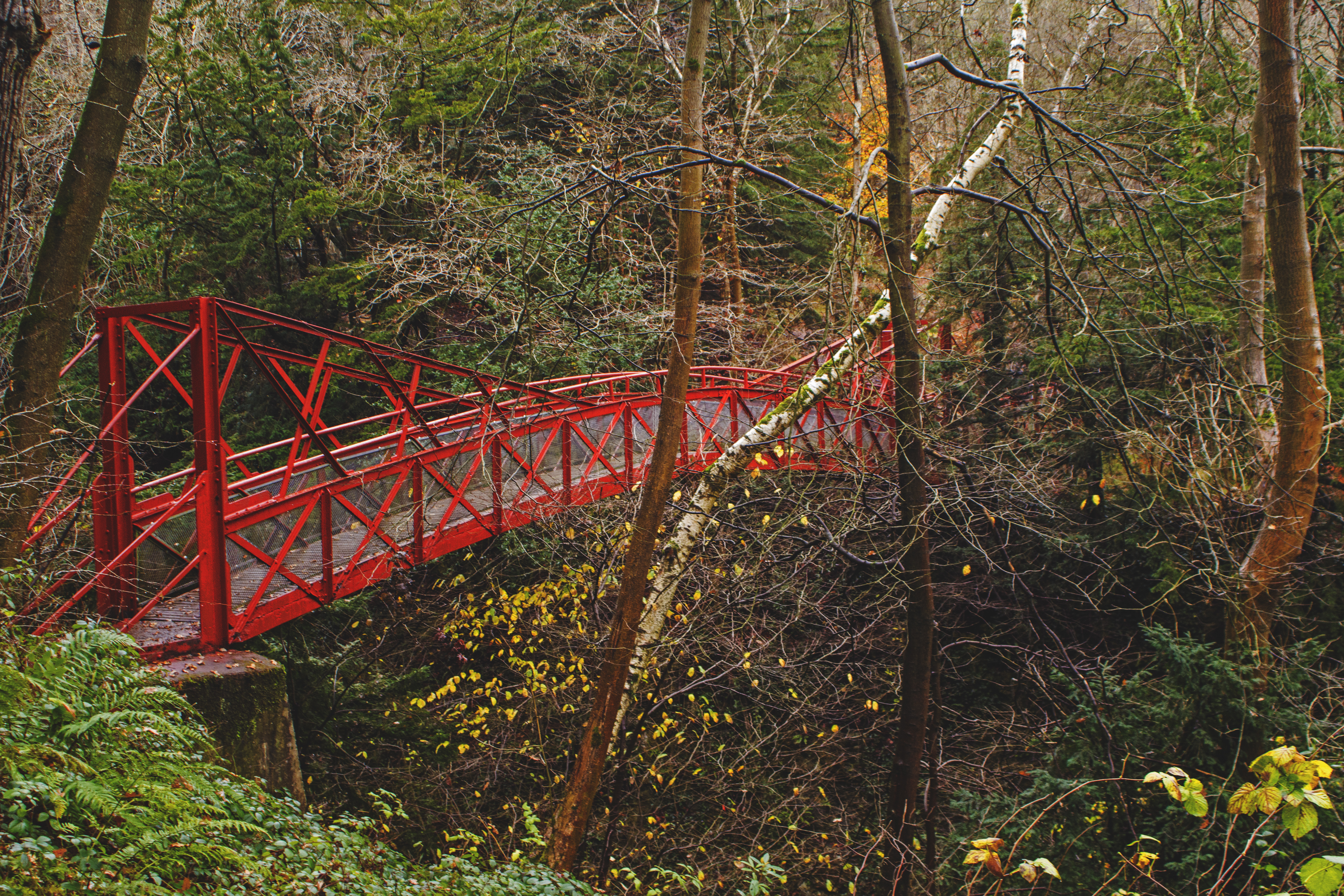
Gunners Bridge Castle Eden Dene Nation Nature Reserve

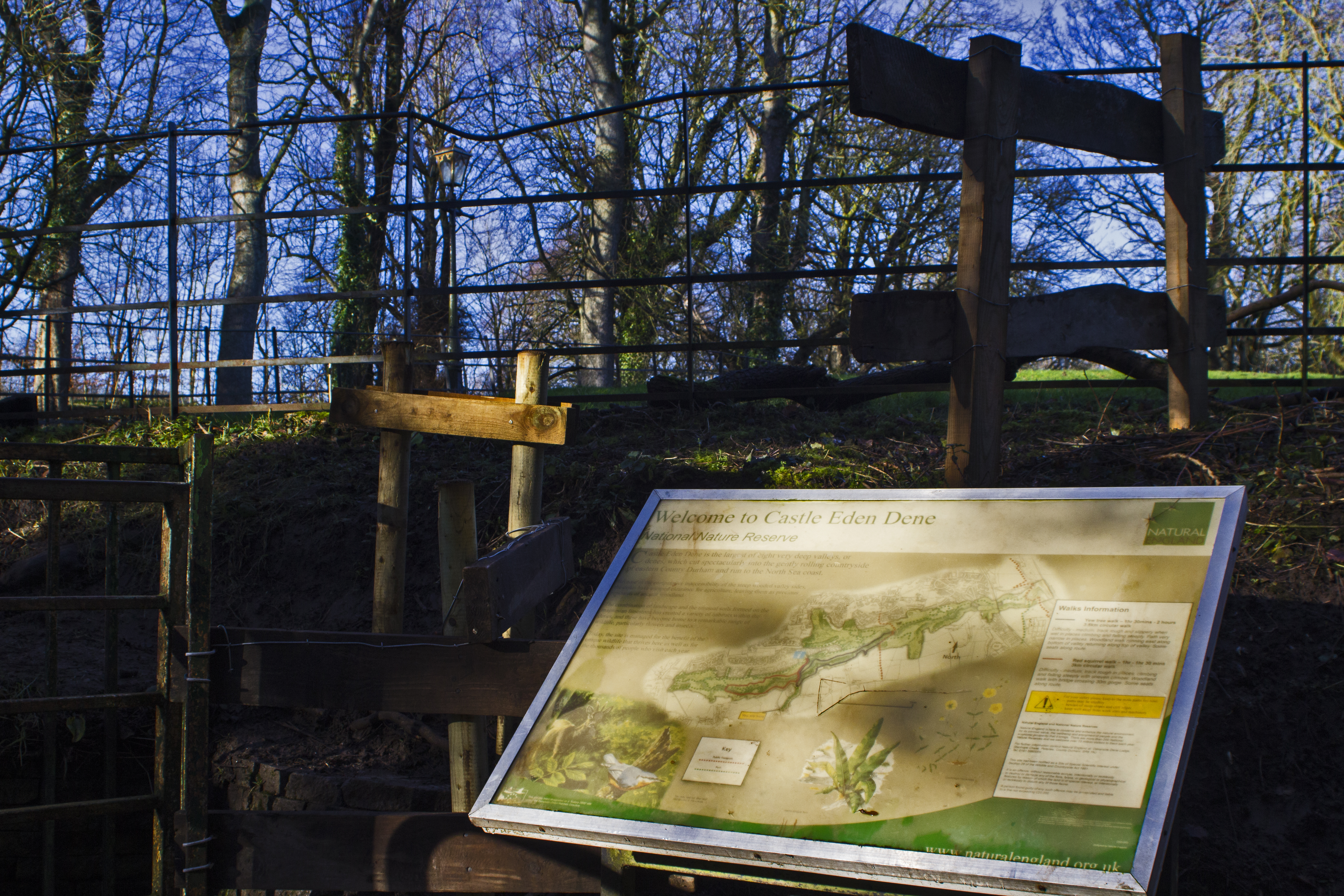
St James Churce entrance information board Castle Eden Dene Nation Nature Reserve

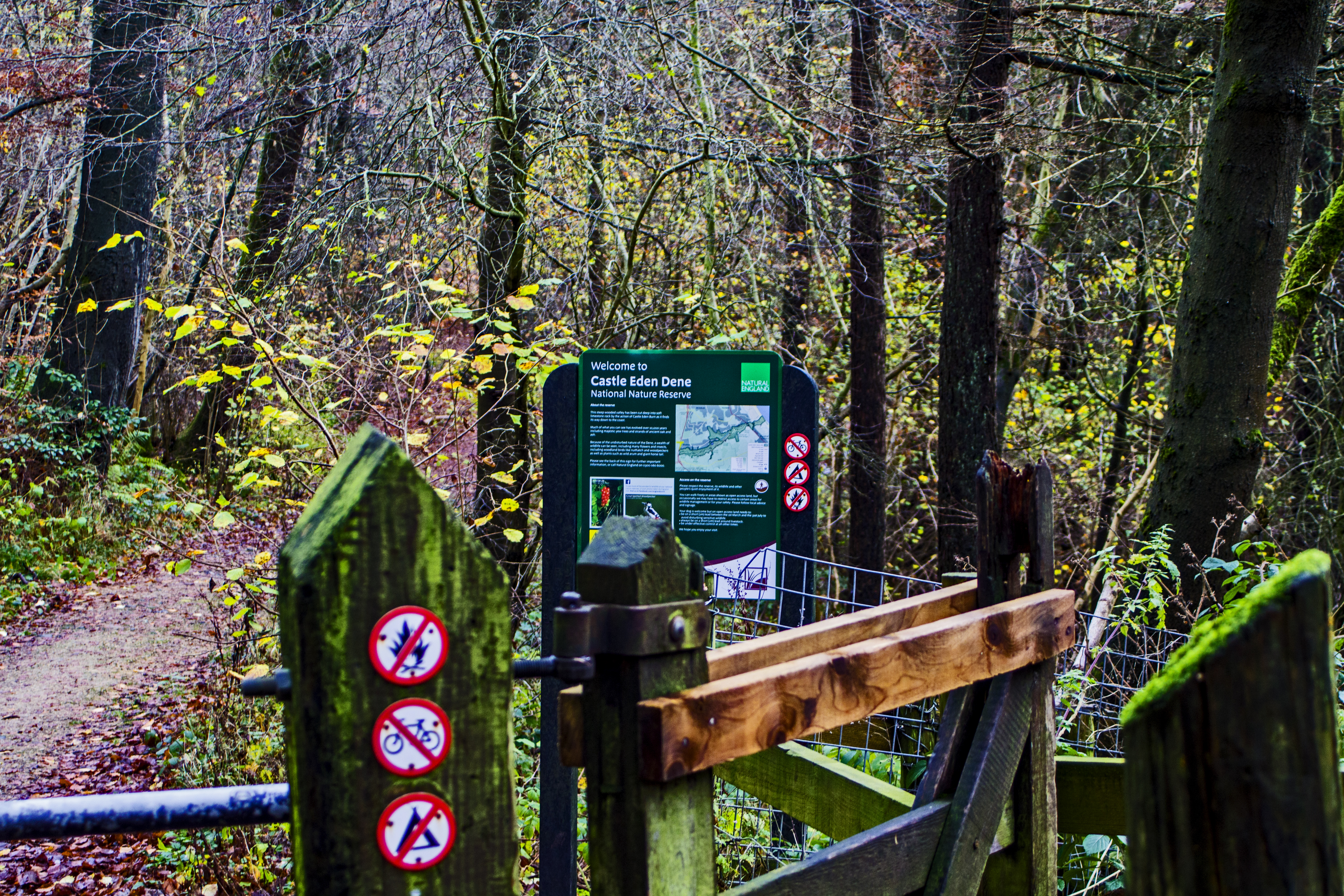
A19 Entrance info board
