= Horden =

Village in County Durham, England

Coordinates: 54.764°N 1.315°W

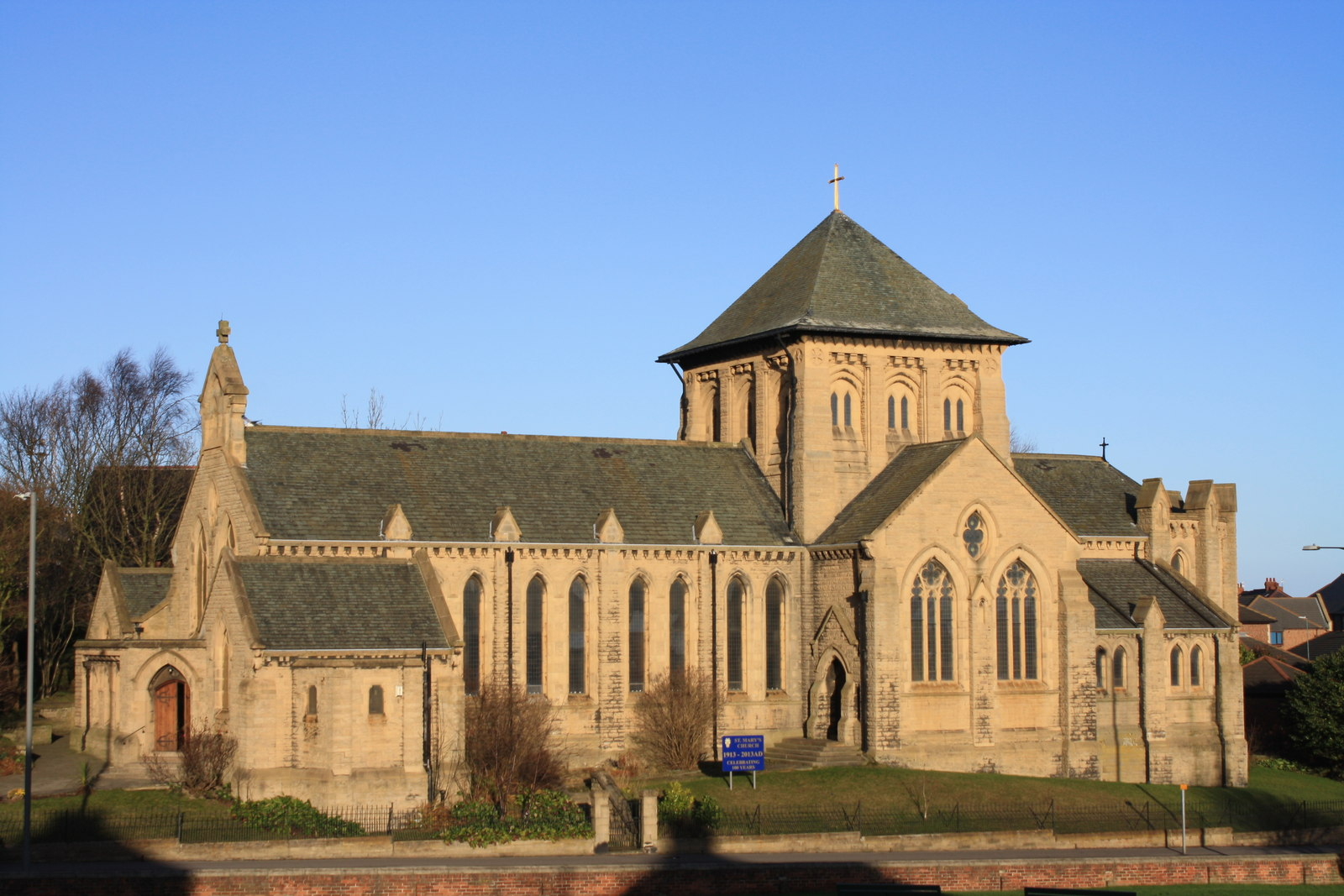
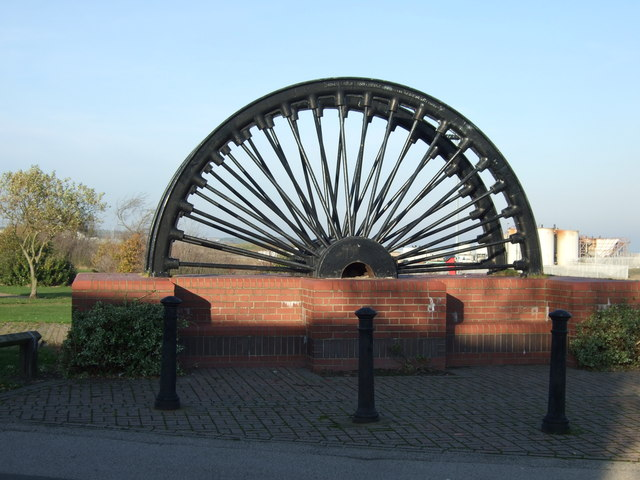
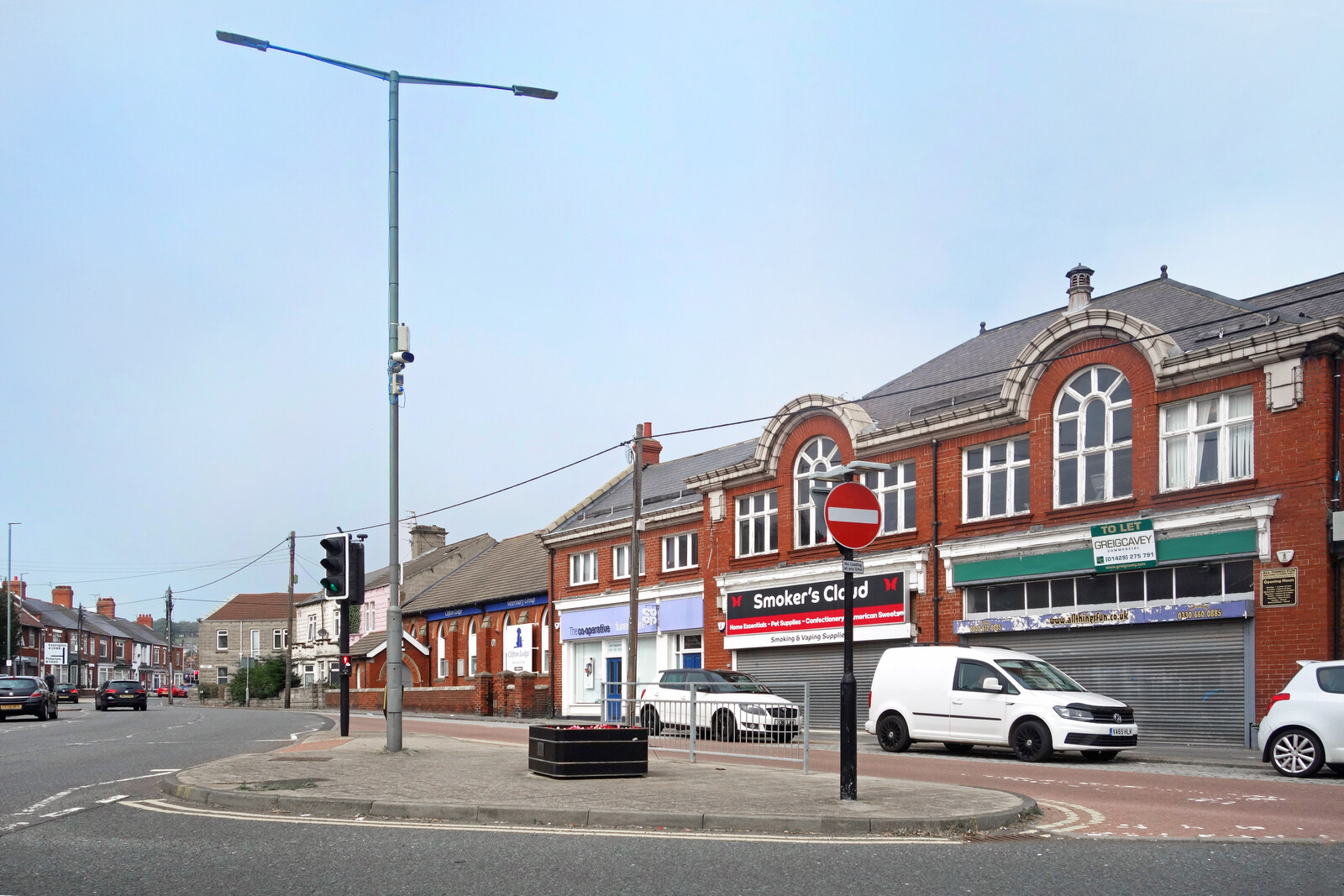
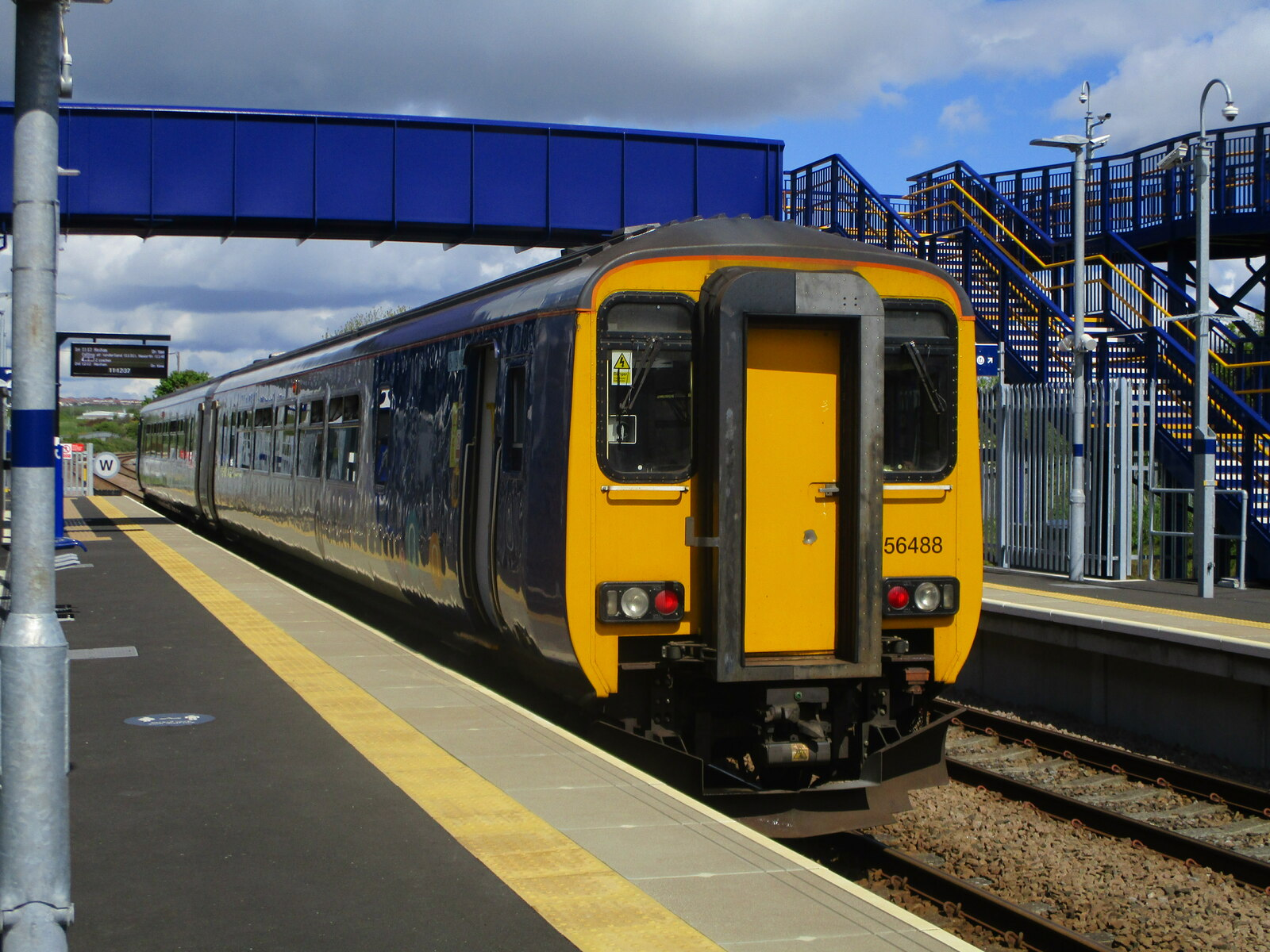
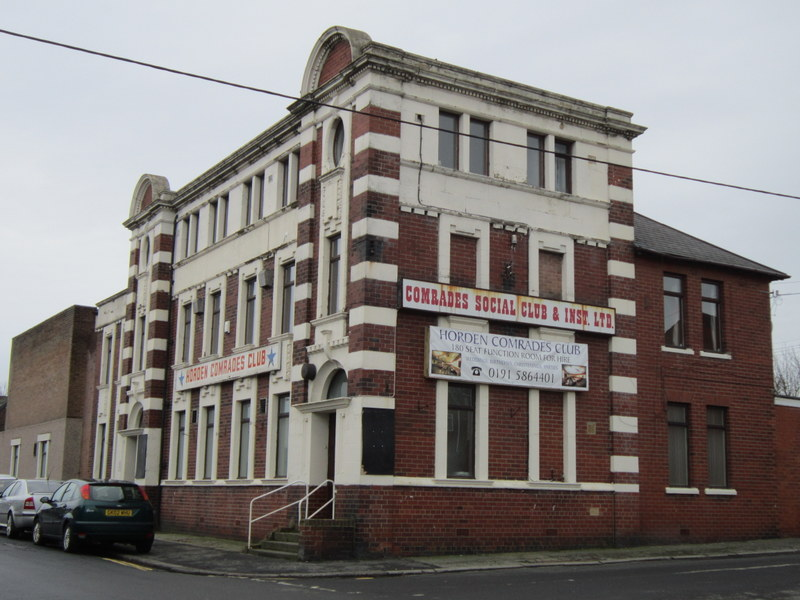
- St Mary’s Church Mining Memorial Cotsford Lane The Station Comrades Club

- Location within County Durham
- Population: 8,087 (2011 census)
- Civil parish: Horden
- Unitary authority: County Durham
- Ceremonial county: County Durham
- Region: North East
- Country: England
- Sovereign state: United Kingdom
- Post town: PETERLEE
- Postcode district: SR8
- Dialling code: 0191
- Police: Durham
- Fire: County Durham and Darlington
- Ambulance: North East
- UK Parliament: Easington

Horden is a village and electoral ward in County Durham, England. It is situated on the North Sea coast, to the east of Peterlee, approximately 12 miles south of Sunderland. Horden was a mining village until the closure of the Horden Colliery in 1987. Main features include the Welfare and Memorial Parks and St Mary's church. It is connected to the villages of Blackhall Colliery and Blackhall Rocks to its south by a spectacular rail viaduct which spans Castle Eden Dene near Denemouth. Horden Dene provides Horden's northern boundary with Easington Colliery.

== History ==
The local manor house, Horden Hall, was built in the early 17th century by Sir John Conyers, 1st Baronet (d.1664). However, Horden village did not really begin to develop beyond a few farmhouses until the construction of Horden Colliery began in 1900. By 1920 Pitmen's homes were built, initially in rows of houses named First to Thirteenth Streets.

Horden has an Anglo-Saxon name that comes from an old word ‘horu’ meaning ‘dirty’ with the ‘den’ part of the name referring to the dene or valley. Horden is first mentioned in the eleventh century as ‘Horeden’, when there is also mention of a ‘Horetun’ (dirty farm).

The first church in the village, St Hilda's – now the church hall - was opened in 1904, and in 1913 St Mary's church, built by local landowner Colonel Burdon, was consecrated. The village continued to grow strongly, reaching a peak population of 15,000 in 1951. By 1964 there were 3 cinemas, cricket, rugby and football pitches and also a bowling green.

By 1970 the colliery was considered the "Jewel in the Crown" and expected to have a life of 30 years.

Since closure of the mine in 1987, Horden's population has fallen to around 8,500 (2001 census) and it now suffers high unemployment, higher than average health issues and problems with poor housing stock. In addition, Horden has gradually lost most of its services and amenities including Police and Fire Stations, secondary school, many local shops and cinemas. Its railway station reopened in June 2020. Primary and nursery schools remain, including Horden Nursery School, Cotsford Primary School, Yohden Primary School and Our Lady Star of the Sea Primary School.

In political terms, Horden is split between the Horden North and Horden South wards of Durham County Council, both of which are part of the parliamentary constituency of Easington, represented since 2010 by Grahame Morris of the Labour Party.

== Mining ==
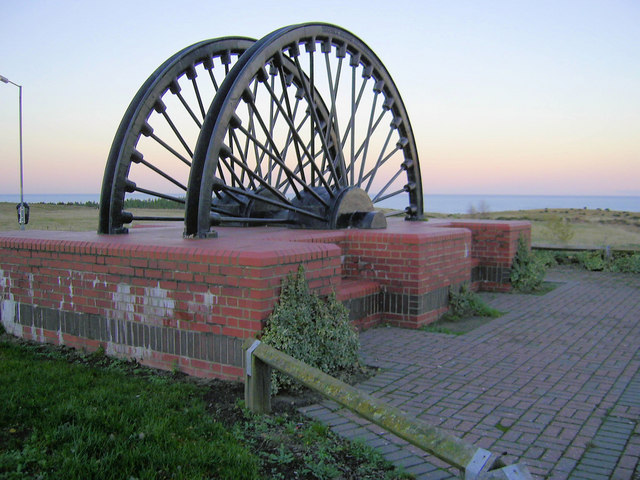
Horden Colliery memorial pit wheel.

Horden Colliery was one of the biggest mines in the country. From the beginning of construction in 1900 to nationalisation in 1947 it was owned and operated by Horden Collieries Ltd, who also operated mines at Blackhall, Castle Eden and Shotton. Following nationalisation the mine was operated by the National Coal Board.

The mine was operated mainly for the purpose of working undersea coal, and had three shafts. At the height of operating in the 1930s it employed over 4,000 men and produced over 1.5million tonnes of coal a year.

Large volumes of water and other geological issues meant that Horden Colliery failed to make a profit from the later-1970s onwards, and was finally closed in 1987. The only original sites left now are the medical centre (site now occupied by a gymnasium), the baths (now rebuilt into offices), the canteen (now occupied by a garage) and the ventilation office (now used by the local council).

Rising minewater following the closure led to fears of contamination of drinking water. A minewater treatment plant was installed in 2004 by the Coal Authority to remove the majority of the iron and raise the pH level of the water. This was a temporary measure, prior to installation of a permanent passive mine water treatment system.

== Regeneration ==
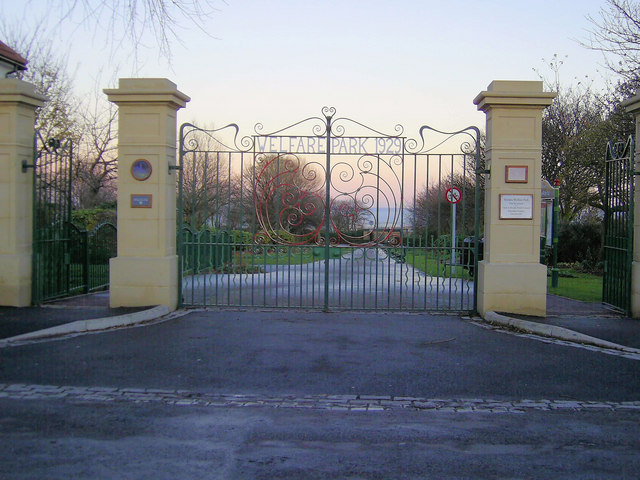
Opening gates of Horden Colliery Welfare park.

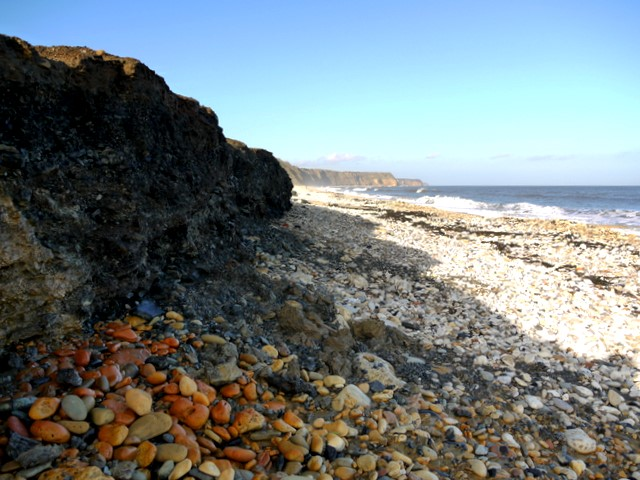
Eroding bank of coal-mine waste, Horden Beach

In recent years Horden has benefited from the removal of mining spoil heaps and the redevelopment of its Welfare Park (which houses Horden's rugby, cricket and football teams). The Welfare and Memorial Parks are both designated Green Flag Parks with the Welfare Park also recognised with the Green Heritage Award. The Colliery Welfare Park was originally funded by the miners themselves in the 1920s who paid an amount of money from their wages. At one time there was a swimming pool filled with water pumped out from the mine, which swimmers were only allowed to use if they were able to swim a certain distance. Now there is a basketball court / tennis court, two children's play areas, a band stand, and gardens to walk round. Marra is a 2015 sculpture by Ray Lonsdale of a miner with his heart torn out, depicting the death of mining communities.

The Durham Heritage Coast Partnership (previously the lottery funded Turning the Tide programme) is committed to the conservation, protection and enhancement of the coastline, which is home to a rich variety of flora and fauna.

== Transport ==
The A1086 road is the main road through the village linking with Easington and the A19 to Sunderland in the north and Blackhall and the A179 to Hartlepool in the south; the B1320 links the village to Peterlee and Shotton in the west.

The village is served by Horden railway station on the Durham Coast Line. This station, which opened on 29 June 2020, replaced Horden's earlier station which closed in May 1964.

In 1987, the United Peterlee Panther bus service was launched between Peterlee and Horden/Horden Hall Estate. It stopped anywhere passengers wanted, except on Cosford Lane. The service is mirrored today in Go North East's services 209 and 210. A number of regular Arriva and Go North East services operate through the main streets of Horden.

== Notable residents ==
- John Alderson (television and film actor noted for playing the lead in the 1957–58 syndicated western television series, Boots and Saddles)
- Stan Anderson (professional footballer, born 1933)
- Eddy Ellwood (world champion bodybuilder and professional Strongman competitor)
- Alan Hammonds, founder member and lead singer of the cult British power pop band Incredible Kidda Band
- Dale Roberts, professional footballer
- Bob Taylor, professional footballer
- Tom Watson, professional footballer
