= Crimdon =

Village in County Durham, England

Coordinates: 54.728°N 1.255°W

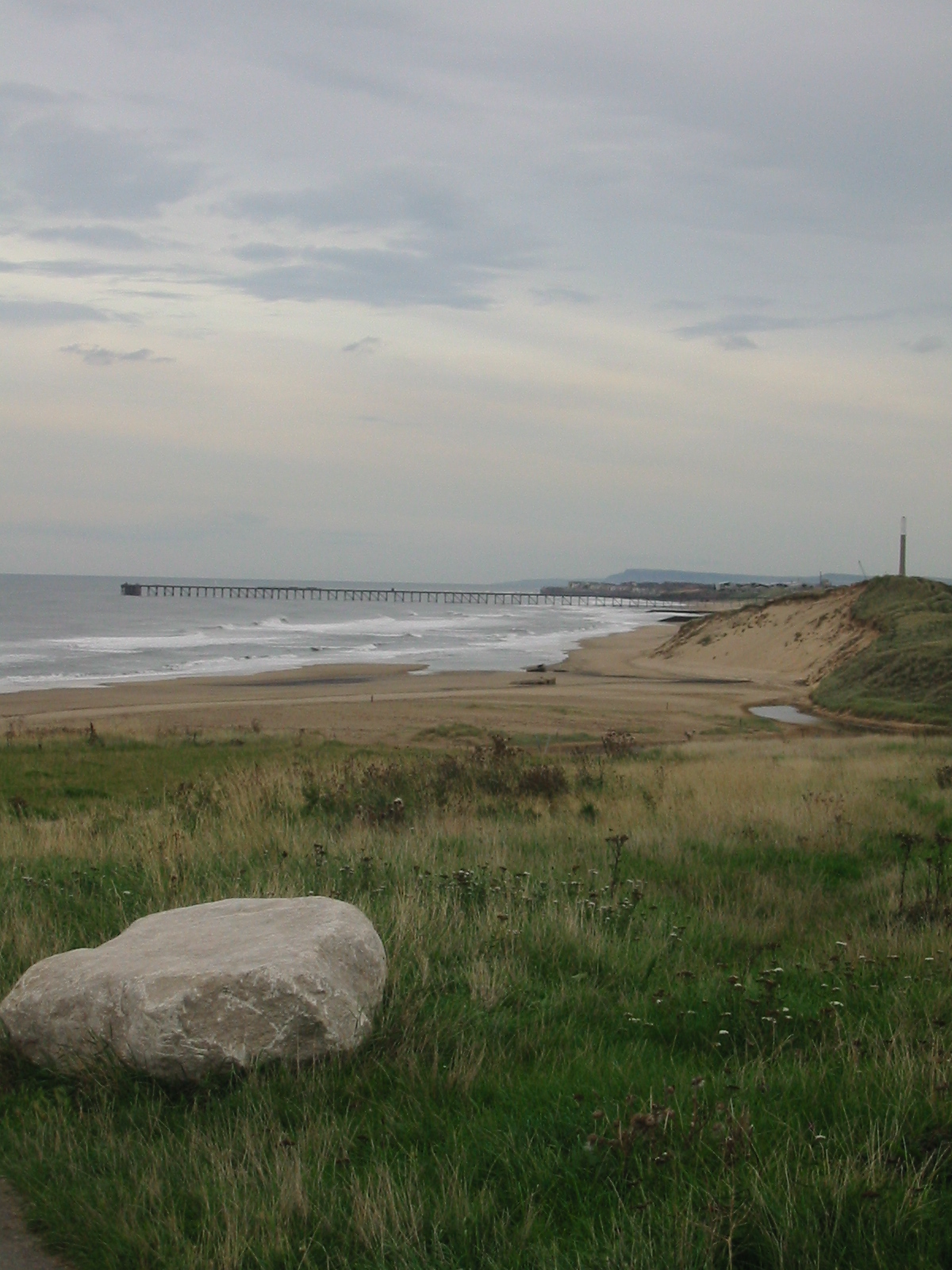
- Crimdon

- Location within County Durham
- OS grid reference: NZ480372
- Civil parish: Monk Hesleden
- Unitary authority: County Durham
- Ceremonial county: County Durham
- Region: North East
- Country: England
- Sovereign state: United Kingdom
- Post town: HARTLEPOOL
- Postcode district: TS27
- Police: Durham
- Fire: County Durham and Darlington
- Ambulance: North East

Crimdon is a coastal village in County Durham, England. It is situated on the North Sea coast, between Blackhall Rocks and Hartlepool on the A1086 road.
