= Peterlee =

Town in County Durham, England

Coordinates: 54.76°N 1.33°W

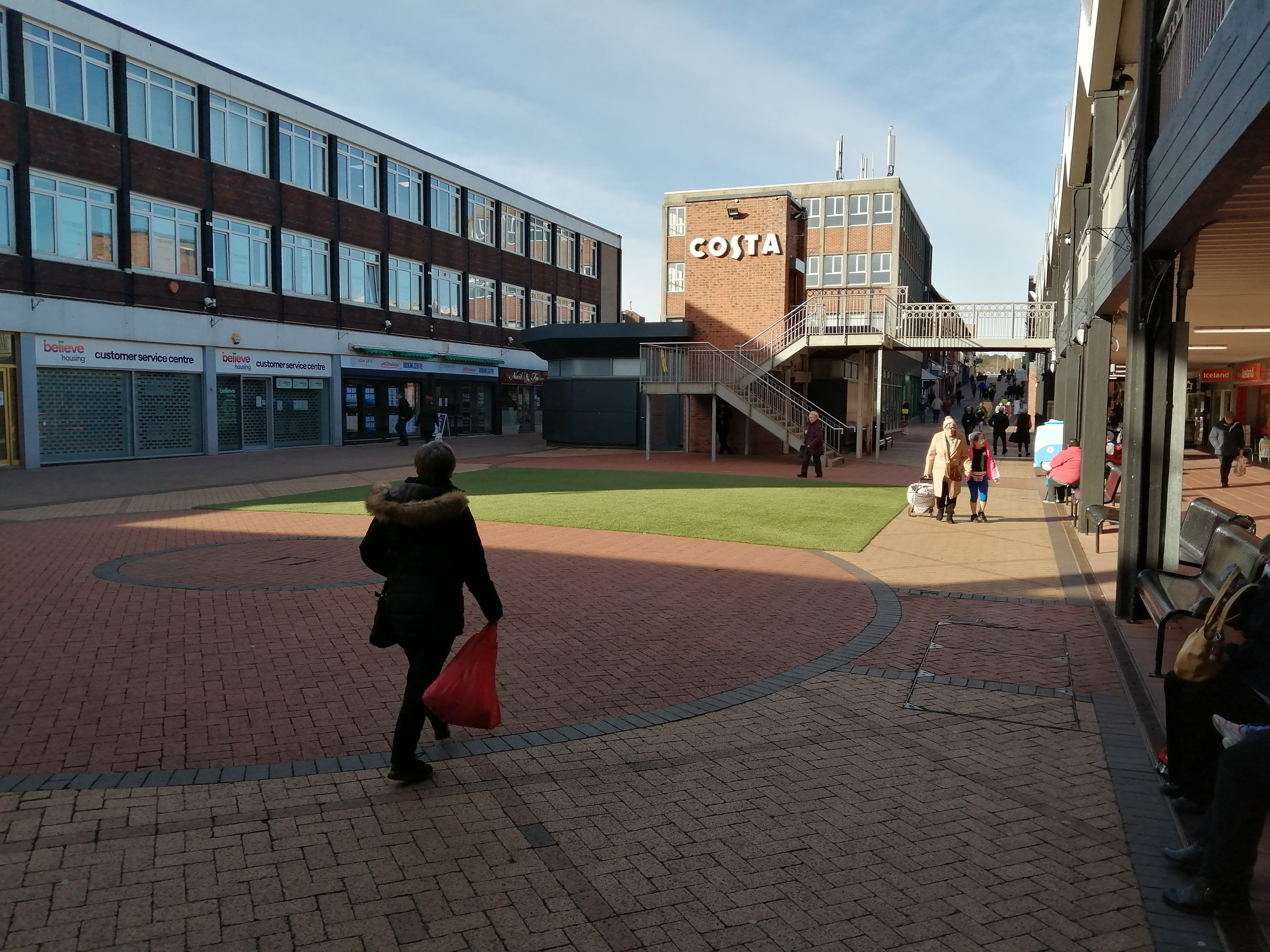
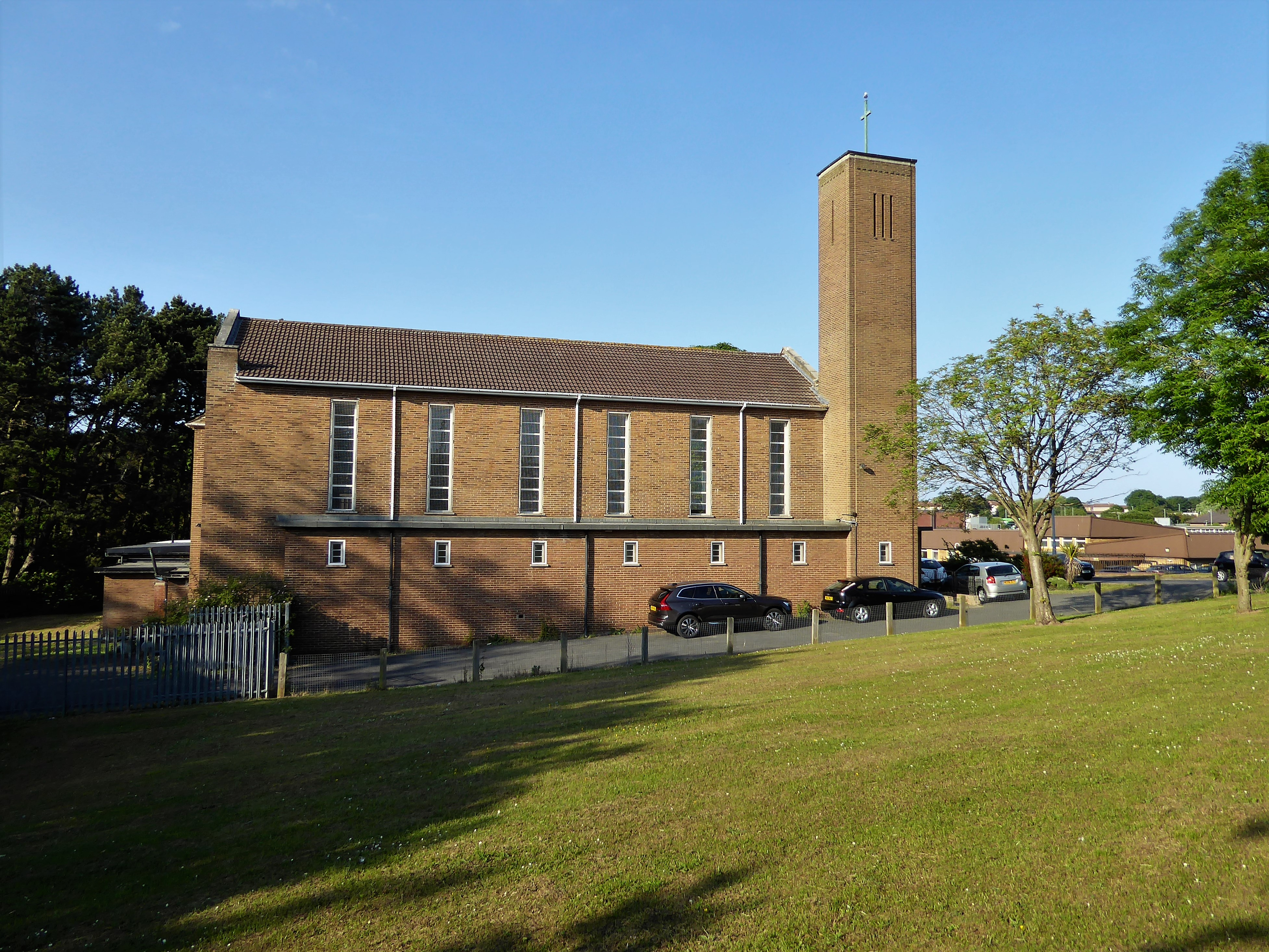
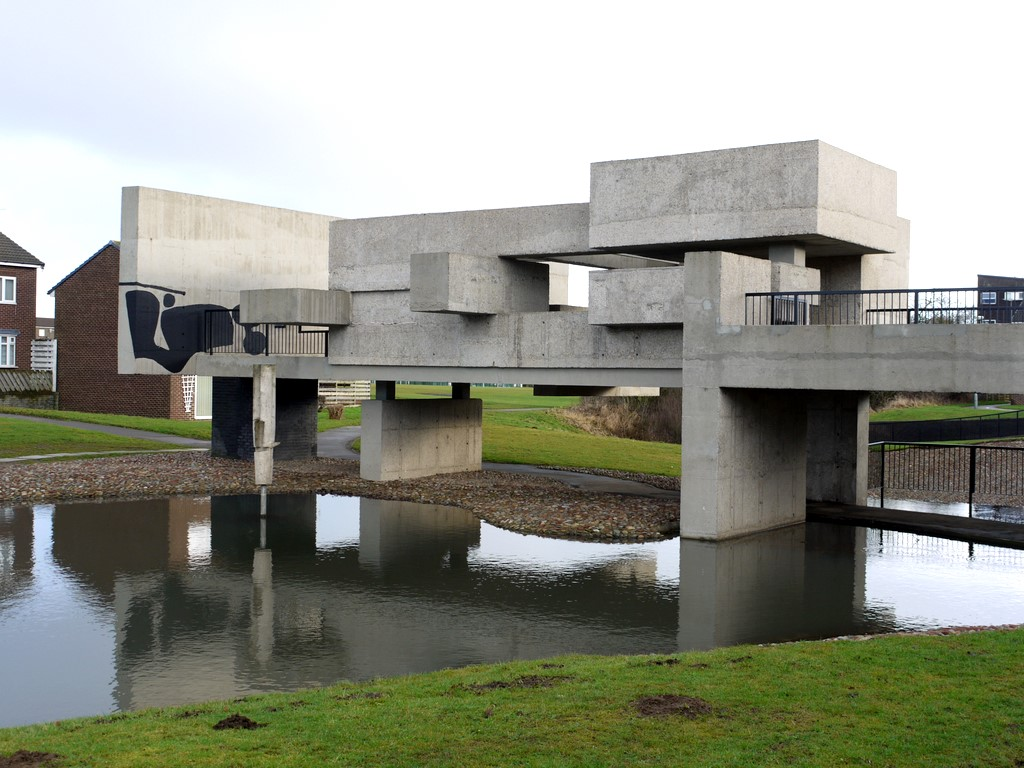
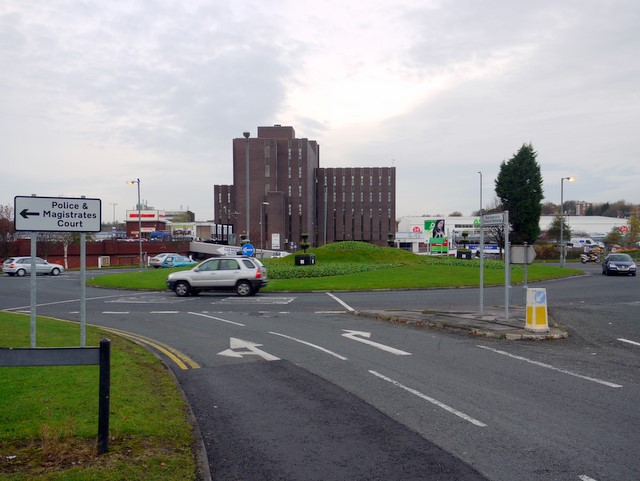
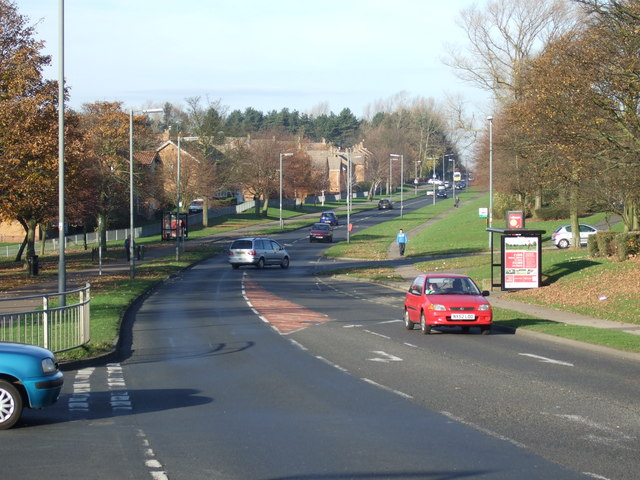
- Town Centre, Memorial Methodist Church, Apollo Pavilion, Lee House and Essington Way

- Location within County Durham
- Population: 20,300 (2021)
- OS grid reference: NZ430409
- Civil parish: Peterlee
- Unitary authority: County Durham
- Ceremonial county: County Durham
- Region: North East
- Country: England
- Sovereign state: United Kingdom
- Areas of the town: List: Easington; Easington Colliery (Town); Horden; Little Thorpe; Shotton
- Post town: PETERLEE
- Postcode district: SR8
- Dialling code: 0191
- Police: Durham
- Fire: County Durham and Darlington
- Ambulance: North East
- UK Parliament: Easington
- Website: www.peterlee.gov.uk

Peterlee is a town in County Durham, England, south of Sunderland, north of Hartlepool, west of the Durham Coast and east of Durham. It gained town status in 1948 under the New Towns Act 1946, which also created the nearby settlements of Newton Aycliffe and Washington, Tyne and Wear.

== History ==
The case for founding Peterlee was put forward in Farewell Squalor by Easington Rural District Council Surveyor C. W. Clarke, who also proposed that the town be named after celebrated Durham miners' leader Peter Lee. It is one of the few places in the British Isles named after a recent individual, and unique among post-Second World War new towns in having its existence requested by local people through their MP. A deputation, consisting mostly of working miners, met the Minister of Town and Country Planning to put the case for a new town in the district. The minister, Lewis Silkin, responded by offering a half-size new town of 30,000 residents. The subsequent new residents came largely from surrounding villages in the District of Easington.

Peterlee Development Corporation was founded in 1948, first under Dr Monica Felton, then under A.V. Williams. The original master plan for tower blocks of flats by Berthold Lubetkin was rejected as unsuitable for the area's geology, which had been weakened by mining works, and Lubetkin resigned in 1950. George Grenfell Baines' plan was accepted, and construction quickly began, but it was of poor quality. Williams invited artist Victor Pasmore to head the landscaping design team.

== Governance ==
Peterlee is a civil parish and has a Town Council. Peterlee is under Durham County Council, the unitary authority elected to govern County Durham.

=== Mayor ===
Peterlee's first elected mayor was William Whitehouse, who previously served on its council. Earlier he was in the Royal Air Force and taught at a school in Horden.

== Landmarks ==
=== Apollo Pavilion ===
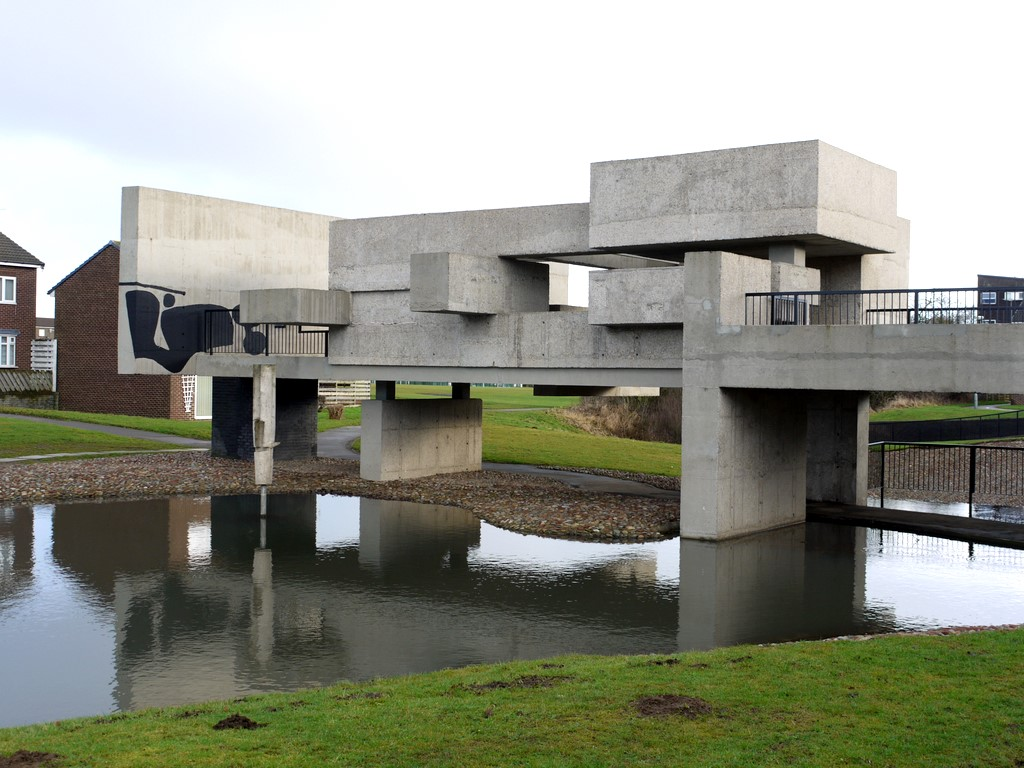
The Apollo Pavilion

The Apollo Pavilion (1970) was designed by Victor Pasmore. It provided a focal point for the Sunny Blunts estate as well as a bridge across a water-course. It was named after the Apollo Moon missions.

From the late 1970s the Pavilion suffered from vandals and antisocial behaviour. The murals on the building faded, and to discourage antisocial behaviour, staircases were removed in the 1980s. In 1996, there was a failed attempt to list the Pavilion. English Heritage described it as "an internationally important masterpiece"; however, some local residents and councillors considered it an eyesore and campaigned to have it demolished. The campaign seemed to have been successful when demolition was proposed in 2000. However, in July 2009, a six-month revamp programme was completed at a cost of £400,000, which includes reinstating the original murals and stairs.

In December 2011, English Heritage gave the pavilion a Grade-II* listing.

== Transport ==
=== Road ===
Peterlee is served by the main A19 road running west of the town to Sunderland in the north and Hartlepool in the south, and the A1086 to its east leading to Easington in the north and Hartlepool to the south. The B1320 runs through the town centre linking the town to Horden and the A1086 in the east and Shotton Colliery and the A19 in the west. The B1432 to the north of the town centre leads to Easington Village, Hawthorn and Seaham on the route of the old A19. The A181 runs to the south-west of the town at the Castle Eden and Wingate junction on the A19 leading to Wheatley Hill, Thornley, and Durham. In 2008, the A688 was extended to the A181 at Running Waters from the A1(M) junction at Bowburn, creating a trunk road from Peterlee to the A1(M) via the A19, A181 and A688.

=== Buses ===
Peterlee is served by Arriva North East and Go North East in the local area, to Dalton Park, and to the towns and cities of Newcastle, Gateshead, Sunderland, Houghton-le-Spring, Durham, Hartlepool, Sedgefield, Billingham, Stockton and Middlesbrough.

=== Rail ===
Peterlee is served by Horden, approximately 1 mile (1.5 kilometres) east, on the Durham Coast Line. This station, which opened on 29 June 2020, replaced Horden's earlier station which closed in May 1964. Until 1952, there had also been a station approximately two miles (three kilometres) west in Shotton Colliery called Shotton Bridge.

== Education ==
=== Secondary ===
- Dene Academy
- The Academy at Shotton Hall
- St Bede's Catholic School

== Culture ==
- Castle Eden Dene, most of which is within the boundaries of Peterlee, is a national nature reserve.

== Town twinning ==
Peterlee is twinned with Nordenham, Germany since 1981.

== Notable residents ==
- Chris Brown, former Premier League footballer born in Doncaster, who moved to Peterlee when young and attended The Academy at Shotton Hall
- Courtney Hadwin (born 2004), award-winning rock singer, studied here
- Mark Hoban (born 1964), politician, former Conservative MP for Fareham
- Gina McKee (born 1964), actress
- Crissy Rock (born 1958), Liverpool-born actress and comedienne
- Roy Walker (born 1940), comedian and television presenter
