= List of closed railway stations in Great Britain: B =

The list of closed railway stations in Great Britain includes the following: Year of closure is given if known. Stations reopened as heritage railways continue to be included in this list and some have been linked. Some stations have been reopened to passenger traffic. Some former passenger lines remain in use for freight and mineral traffic.

== B ==
=== Ba ===
Station (Town, unless in station name)	Rail company	Year closed	Notes
Back of Law	Dundee and Newtyle Railway	1855	
Back O'Loch Halt	L&NER	1964	
Backney Halt	GWR	1962	
Backworth (1st)	North Eastern Railway	1864	
Backworth	NER	1977	
Bacton	GWR	1941	
Bacup	L&YR	1966	
Badgworth	MR	1846	
Badminton	GWR	1968	
Baggrow	Maryport and Carlisle Railway	1930	
Bagillt	L&NWR	1966	
Baglan Sands Halt	GWR	1939	
Baguley	CLC	1964	
Bagworth and Ellistown (First)	MR	1849	
Bagworth and Ellistown (2nd)	MR	1964	
Bailey Gate	S&DJR	1966	
Bailiff Bridge	L&YR	1917	
Baillieston	CR	1964	reopened 1993
Bainton	NER	1954	
Bainton Gate	MR	1856	
Bakewell	MR	1967	
Bala (New)	GWR	1965	
Bala Junction	GWR	1965	
Bala Lake Halt	Great Western Railway	1939	reopened 1976
Balado	NBR	1964	
Balbeuchly (Foot)	Dundee and Perth and Aberdeen Railway Junction Company	1855	
Balbeuchly (Top)	Dundee and Perth and Aberdeen Railway Junction Company	1860	
Balchriston Level Crossing Halt	G&SWR	1930	
Baldersby	NER	1959	
Balderton	GWR	1952	
Baldovan & Downfield	Caledonian Railway	1955	
Baldragon	Caledonian	1955	
Baldwins Halt	GWR	1933	
Balerno	Caledonian	1943	
Balfron	NBR	1951	
Balgowan	Caledonian	1951	
Balgreen Halt	L&NER	1968	
Ballachulish	Caledonian	1966	
Ballachulish Ferry	Caledonian	1966	
Ballater	GNoSR	1966	
Ballathie	Caledonian	1868	
Ballencrieff	NBR	1847	
Ballifurth Farm Halt	BR	1965	
Ballindalloch	GNoSR	1965	
Ballingham	GWR	1964	
Ballinluig	Highland	1965	
Balloch Central	Caledonian and Dunbartonshire Junction Railway	1988	
Balloch Pier	Caledonian and Dunbartonshire Junction Railway	1986	
Balmore	NBR	1951	
Balnacoul Halt	Highland	1931	
Balnaguard Halt	LM&SR	1965	
Balne	NER	1958	
Balquhidder	Caledonian	1965	
Balsham Road	Newmarket and Chesterford Railway	1851	
Balshaw Lane and Euxton	LNWR	1969	reopened 1997 as Euxton Balshaw Lane
Bamfurlong	North Union Railway	1950	
Bampton (Devon)	GWR	1963	
Bampton (Oxford)	GWR	1962	
Banavie Pier	NBR	1939	
Banbury Merton Street	Buckinghamshire Railway	1961	
Banchory (1st)	GNoSR	1859	
Banchory (2nd)	GNoSR	1966	
Bandon Halt	LBSC	1914	
Banff	GNSR	1964	
Banff Bridge	GNSR	1951	
Banff and Macduff	GNSR	1872	
Bangor-on-Dee	Cambrian Railways	1962	
Bangour	NBR	1921	
Bankfoot	Caledonian	1931	
Bankhead (Aberdeen)	GNSR	1937	
Bankhead (Lanarkshire)	Caledonian	1945	
Banknock	Kilsyth and Bonnybridge Railway	1935	see Butt, p.26
Banks	L&YR	1964	
Bannister Green Halt	GER	1952	
Bannockburn	Caledonian	1950	
Baptist End Halt	GWR	1964	
Barbers Bridge	GWR	1959	
Barbon	L&NWR	1954	
Barcaldine	Caledonian Railway	1966	
Barcombe	LB&SCR	1955	
Barcombe Mills	LB&SCR	1969	
Bardney	GNR	1970	
Bardon Hill	MR	1952	
Bardowie	NBR	1931	
Bardsey	NER	1964	
Bargeddie (NBR)	NBR	1927	
Bargoed Colliery Halt	Great Western Railway	1962	
Barham	SE&CR	1940	
Barkston	GNR	1955	
Barleith	LM&SR	1964	
Barlow	NER	1964	
Barmby	HBR	1932	
Barnack	GNR	1929	
Barnard Castle	NER	1964	
Barnbow	NER	1924	
Barnby Dun (First)	GCR	1866	
Barnby Dun (Second)	GCR	1967	
Barnby Moor and Sutton	GNR	1949	
Barnham (Suffolk)	GER	1953	
Barnhill (Angus)	Caledonian	1955	
Barnhill (Perth)	Dundee and Forfar Direct Line	1849	
Barnoldswick	Barnoldswick Railway	1965	
Barnsley Court House	Midland Railway	1960	
Barnstaple Quay	L&SWR	1898	
Barnstaple Town	L&SWR	1970	
Barnstaple Victoria Road	Devon and Somerset Railway	1960	
Barnstone	GNR/LNWR Joint	1953	
Barnton	Caledonian	1951	
Barnwell	LNWR	1964	
Barnwell Junction	GER	1962	
Baron's Lane Halt	GER	1939	
Barras	NER	1962	
Barrasford	NER	1956	
Barrhead Central	G&SWR	1917	
Barrmill	Glasgow, Barrhead and Kilmarnock Joint Railway	1962	
Barrow (for Tarvin)	Cheshire Lines Committee	1953	
Barrow Hill	MR	1954	
Barrow (Rabbit Hill)	Furness Railway	1862	
Barrow (Ramsden Dock)	Furness Railway	1915	
Barrow Shipyard	Furness Railway	1967	
Barrow Strand	Furness Railway	1882	
Barrow-on-Soar and Quorn	MR	1968	reopened 1994
Barry Pier	Barry Railway	1971	
Bartlow	GER	1967	
Barton (Hereford)	GWR	1893	
Barton (Lancashire)	Lancashire and Yorkshire Railway	1938	
Barton and Broughton	L&PJR	1939	
Barton and Walton	MR	1958	
Barton Hill	NER	1930	
Barton Moss (1st)	LNWR	1862<	
Barton Moss (2nd)	LNWR	1929	
Barton Stacey	Great Western Railway	1941	
Barton-le-street	NER	1931	
Baschurch	GWR	1960	
Basford	LNWR	1875	
Basford North	GNR	1964	
Basford Vernon	MR	1960	
Basingstoke	GWR	1932	
Bason Bridge	Somerset and Dorset Joint Railway	1966	
Bassaleg	Brecon and Merthyr Railway	1962	
Bassaleg Junction	GWR	1962	
Bassenthwaite Lake	Cockermouth, Keswick and Penrith Railway	1966	
Bath Green Park	MR/S&DJR	1966	
Bath Road Halt	North & South Western Junction Railway	1917	
Bathampton	GWR	1966	
Bathford Halt	GWR	1965	
Bathgate (1986 station)	British Rail	2010	
Bathgate Lower	NBR	1930	
Bathgate Upper	NBR	1956	
Batley Carr	GNR	1950	
Battersea	West London Extension Joint Railway	1940	
Battersea Park	LB&SCR	1870	
Battersea Park Road	London, Chatham and Dover Railway	1916	
Battyeford	L&NWR	1953	
Bawdrip Halt	Somerset and Dorset Joint Railway	1952	
Bawtry	GNR	1958	
Baxenden	L&YR	1951	
Bay Horse (aka "Bayhorse")	L&PJR	1960	
Baynards	LB&SCR	1965	

=== Be ===
Station (Town, unless in station name)	Rail company	Year closed	Notes
Beach Road	BWA	1917	
Beag Fair Siding	NRM	1883	
Beal	NER	1968	
Bealings	GER	1956	
Beam Bridge	B&ER	1844	
Beamish	NER	1953	
Beanacre Halt	GWR	1955	
Bearpark	NER	1939	
Beattock	CAL	1972	
Beattock Summit Halt	CAL	1926	
Beauchief (Sheffield)	MR	1961	
Beaufort	LNWR	1958	
Beauly	Highland Railway	1960	reopened 2002
Beaumont's Halt	MR	1947	
Beaver's Hill Halt	GWR	1964	
Bebside	NER	1964	Reopened in 2025 as Blyth Bebside
Beckermet	Whitehaven, Cleator and Egremont Junction Railway	1947	
Beckermet Mines	Whitehaven, Cleator and Egremont Junction Railway	1923	
Beckford	MR	1963	
Beckhole	NER	1914	
Beckingham	Great Northern and Great Eastern Joint Railway	1959	
Beckton	GER	1940	
Bedale	NER	1954	
Beddau Halt	Taff Vale Railway	1952	
Beddgelert	Welsh Highland Railway	1936	Reopened in 2009
Beddington Lane Halt	LBSCR	1997	
Bedford St Johns	British Railways	1968	New station relocated in 1984
Bedlington	NER	1964	Reopened 2026
Bedlinog	Rhymney Railway	1964	
Bedwas	Brecon and Merthyr Railway	1962	
Bedwelty Pits Halt	LNWR	1960	
Bedworth	LNWR	1965	reopened 1988
Beechburn	NER	1965	
Beeston (West Yorkshire)	GNR	1953	
Beeston Castle and Tarporley	LNWR	1966	
Beeston Tor	North Staffordshire Railway	1934	
Beighton	GC	1954	
Beighton	North Midland Railway	1843	
Beith North	G&SWR	1951	
Beith Town	Glasgow, Barrhead and Kilmarnock Joint Railway	1962	
Belasis Lane	LNER	1954	
Belford	NER	1968	
Belgrave & Birstall	GCR	1963	
Belgrave Road (Leicester)	GNR	1953	specials ran until 1962
Bell Busk	MR	1959	
Bellahouston	G&SWR	1954	
Bellahouston Park Halt	LMS	1939	
Belle Vue Halt (North Yorkshire)	Sand Hutton Light Railway	1930	
Bellingham (North Tyne)	NBR	1956	
Bellshill (NBR)	NBR	1951	
Belmont (Durham)	NER	1857	
Belmont, Middlesex	LMS	1964	
Belses	NBR	1969	
Belton	Axholme Joint Railway	1933	
Belton and Burgh	GER	1959	
Beluncle Halt	SECR	1961	
Bembridge	Isle of Wight Railway	1953	
Benderloch	CAL	1966	
Bengeworth	MR	1953	
Beningbrough	NER	1958	
Bensham	NER	1954	
Bentham Low	"Little" North Western Railway (MR)	1853	
Bentley (Suffolk)	GER	1966	
Bentley (West Midlands)	MR	1898	
Bentley Church	Eastern Union Railway	1853	
Bentley Crossing Halt	West Riding and Grimsby Railway	1943	approximate date
Benton Square	NER	1915	
Bents	NBR	1930	
Bentworth and Lasham	L&SWR	1932	
Berkeley	Severn and Wye Railway	1964	
Berkeley Road	MR	1965	
Berrington	GWR	1963	
Berrington and Eye	Shrewsbury and Hereford Joint Railway	1958	
Berry Brow	L&YR	1966	new station opened 1989
Berw Road Halt	TVR	1906	
Berwig Halt	GWR	1931	
Berwyn	GWR	1964	reopened by Llangollen Rly Society in 1986
Bescot Bridge	LNWR	1850	
Besford	MR	1846	
Bessacarr Halt	Great Northern and Great Eastern Joint Railway	1924	
Bestwood Colliery	GNR	1931	
Bethesda	L&NWR	1951	
Betley Road	L&NWR	1945	
Bettisfield	Cambrian Railways	1965	
Bettws Garmon	North Wales Narrow Gauge Railway/Welsh Highland Railway	1936	
Bettws Llangeinor	Port Talbot Railway and Docks Company	1932	
Beulah Halt	GWR	1937	
Beverley Road (Hull)	Hull and Barnsley Railway	1924	
Bexhill West	SE&CR	1964	

=== Bi ===
Station (Town, unless in station name)	Rail company	Year closed	Notes
Bicester London Road	LNWR	1968	reopened 1987 as Bicester Town
Bickershaw and Abram	GCR	1964	
Bickleigh	GWR	1962	
Biddenden	K&ESLR	1954	
Biddick Lane	NER	1869	
Biddulph	North Staffordshire Railway	1927	
Bideford (1st)	L&SWR	1872	
Bideford (2nd)	L&SWR	1965	
Bideford Quay	Bideford, Westward Ho! and Appledore Railway	1917	
Bidford-on-Avon	Stratford-upon-Avon and Midland Junction Railway	1949	
Bieldside	GNoSR	1937	
Bigby Road Bridge	MS&L	1882	
Biggar	CAL	1950	
Bilbster	Sutherland and Caithness Railway/Highland Railway	1960	
Billacombe	GWR	1947	
Billing	L&NWR	1952	
Billingborough and Horbling	GNR	1930	
Billinge Green Halt	L&NWR	1942	
Bilney	GER	1866	
Bilson Halt	GWR	1944	
Bilston Central	GWR	1972	
Bilston Street, Willenhall	L&NWR	1965	
Bilston West	GWR	1962	
Binegar	S&DR	1966	
Bingham Road (Notts)	GNR/L&NWR	1951	
Bingham Road (Surrey)	W&SC	1983	
Binton	Stratford-upon-Avon and Midland Junction Railway	1949	
Birch Vale	GCR/MR Joint Railway	1970	
Birchfield Halt	GNoSR	1956	
Birchgrove (West Glamorgan)	MR	1875	
Birchills	L&NWR	1916	
Birdbrook	CVH	1962	
Birdingbury	L&NWR	1959	
Birdwell and Hoyland Common	GCR	1953	
Birkdale Palace	Cheshire Lines Committee	1952	
Birkenhead Dock	Hoylake Railway	1888	
Birkenhead Grange Lane	Chester and Birkenhead Railway	1844	
Birkenhead Junction Golf Club Platform	Great Central Railway	1923	
Birkenhead Monks Ferry	Chester and Birkenhead Railway	1878	
Birkenhead Town	Chester and Birkenhead Railway	1945	
Birkenhead Woodside	Birkenhead Joint Railway	1967	
Birkenshaw and Tong	GNR/L&NWR	1953	
Birmingham Curzon Street	London and Birmingham Railway	1854	
Birmingham Lawley Street	Midland Railway	1851	
Birmingham Snow Hill	GWR	1972	reopened 1987
Birnie Road Halt	NBR	1951	
Birstall (West Yorkshire)	L&NWR	1917	
Birstall Town	L&NWR	1951	
Birstwith	NER	1951	
Birtley	NER	1955	
Bishop's Castle	Bishop's Castle Railway	1935	
Bishop's Cleeve	GWR	1960	
Bishops Nympton and Molland	GWR	1966	
Bishops Waltham	L&SWR	1933	
Bishopsbourne	South Eastern Railway (UK)	1940	
Bishopsgate	Eastern Counties Railway	1875	
Bishopsgate Low Level	GER	1916	
Bishopstone Beach Halt	LB&SCR	1942	
Bisley Camp	L&SWR	1952	
Bittaford Platform	GWR	1959	
Bitton	MR	1966	since reopened by Avon Valley Railway

=== Bl ===
Station (Town, unless in station name)	Rail company	Year closed	Notes
Blaby	L&NWR	1968	
Black Bank	GER	1963	
Black Bull	North Staffordshire Railway	1927	
Black Dog Halt	GWR	1965	
Black Island Platform	Highland Railway	1959	
Black Lion Crossing Halt	GWR	1924	
Black Rock Halt	GWR	1977	
Blackburn Bolton Road	ELR/L&YR Joint Railway	1859	
Blackburn Forge	Sheffield and Rotherham Railway	1839	
Blackdyke Halt	NBR	1964	
Blackford	Caledonian Railway	1956	
Blackford Hill	NBR	1962	
Blackfriars	SER	1869	
Blackfriars Bridge	LC&DR	1885	
Blackgrange	Stirling and Dunfermline Railway	1852	
Blackhall	Wilsontown, Morningside and Coltness Railway	1893	
Blackhall Colliery	NER	1964	
Blackhall Rocks	NER	1960	
Blackheath Hill	LC&DR	1917	
Blackhill	NER	1955	
Blackmill	GWR	1958	
Blackmoor	Lynton & Barnstaple Railway	1935	
Blackpill	Swansea and Mumbles Railway	1960	
Blackpole Halt	Great Western Railway	1946	
Blackpool Central	P&WJR	1964	
Blackpool South Shore	P&WJR	1916	
Blacksboat	GNSR	1965	
Blackston Junction	North British Railway	1930	
Blackthorn	GWR	1953	
Blackwall	London & Blackwall Railway	1926	
Blackwater (Isle of Wight)	IoWCR	1956	
Blackwell	MR	1966	
Blackwell Mill	Midland Railway	1966	
Blackwood (Caerphilly)	L&NWR	1960	
Blackwood (Strathclyde) (1st)	Caledonian	1905	
Blackwood (Strathclyde) (2nd)	Caledonian	1965	
Blacon	GCR	1968	
Blaenau Ffestiniog Central	GWR	1960	reopened 1982
Blaenau Ffestiniog Junction (Ffestiniog Rly)	Ffestiniog Railway	1939	
Blaenau Ffestiniog North	LNWR	1982	
Blaenau Ffestiniog (Pantyrafon)	LNWR	1881	
Blaenavon High Level	L&NWR	1941	reopened 2010
Blaenavon Low Level	GWR	1962	
Blaendare Road Halt (Pontypool)	GWR	1962	
Blaengarw	GWR	1953	
Blaengwynfi	R&SBR	1968	
Blaenplwyf Halt	GWR	1951	
Blaenrhondda	R&SBR	1968	
Blagdon	GWR	1931	
Blaina	GWR	1962	
Blairadam	NBR	1930	
Blairgowrie	Caledonian	1955	
Blaisdon Halt	GWR	1964	
Blake Hall	Eastern Counties Railway	1981	
Blakeney	Great Western Railway	1887	
Blakesley	Stratford-upon-Avon and Midland Junction Railway	1952	
Blandford Forum	S&DJR	1966	
Blanefield	NBR	1951	
Blankney and Metheringham	Great Northern and Great Eastern Joint Railway	1961	reopened 1975
Bleadon and Uphill	GWR	1964	
Blean and Tyler Hill Halt	SE&CR	1931	
Bledlow	GWR	1963	
Bledlow Bridge Halt	GWR	1957	
Blencow	CK&PR	1972	
Blenheim and Woodstock	GWR	1954	
Bletchington	GWR	1964	
Blidworth and Rainworth	MR	1929	
Blisworth	L&NWR	1960	
Blockley	GWR	1966	
Blodwell Junction	PS&NWR/Cambrian Railways	1951	
Bloomsbury and Nechals	L&NWR	1869	
Blowers Green	GWR	1962	
Blowick	L&YR	1939	
Bloxham	GWR	1951	
Bloxwich	L&NWR	1965	
Bluebell Halt	Bluebell Railway	1962	
Bluestone	M&GNJR	1916	
Blunham	L&NWR	1968	
Blunsdon	M&SWJR	1924	
Bluntisham	GER	1931	
Blyth	NER	1964	
Blythburgh	Southwold Railway	1929	
Blyton	GCR	1959	

=== Bo ===
Station (Town, unless in station name)	Rail company	Year closed	Notes
Boarhills	NBR	1930	
Boar's Head	North Union Railway	1949	
Boat Yard Crossing Halt	L&YR	1913	
Boddam	GNoSR	1932	
Bodfari	L&NWR	1962	
Bodiam	K&ESR	1954	reopened 2000
Bodmin General	GWR	1967	
Bodmin North	L&SWR	1967	
Bogfield (Carlisle)	Maryport and Carlisle Railway	1844	
Bogside (Fife)	NBR	1958	
Bogside (Strathclyde)	G&SWR	1967	
Bogside Moor Halt	L&AR	1930	
Bold	St Helens Canal and Railway	1858	
Boldon	York, Newcastle and Berwick Railway	1853	
Bolham Halt	GWR	1963	
Bollington	GCR/North Stafford Joint Railway	1970	
Bolsover Castle	MR	1930	
Bolsover South	LD&ECR	1951	
Bolton Abbey	MR	1965	
Bolton Crook Street	London and North Western Railway	1874	
Bolton Great Moor Street	London & North Western Railway	1954	
Bolton Percy	York and North Midland Railway	1965	
Bolton Road (Blackburn)	ELR/L&YR Joint Railway	1859	
Bolton Street (Bury)	L&YR	1980	
Bolton-le-Sands	L&NWR	1969	
Boncath	GWR	1962	
Bo'ness	NBR	1956	
Bonnington	NBR	1947	
Bonnybridge	Caledonian	1930	
Bonnybridge Central	Kilsyth and Bonnybridge Railway	1935	see Butt, p.39
Bonnybridge High	NBR	1967	
Bonnyrigg	NBR	1962	
Bont Newydd	GWR	1965	
Bonwm Halt	GWR	1964	
Boosbeck	NER	1960	
Boot	Ravenglass and Eskdale Railway	1922	
Boothferry Park Halt (Hull)	British Railways	1986	
Bootle Balliol Road	LNWR	1948	
Bootle Village	Lancashire & Yorkshire Railway	1876	
Bordon	L&SWR	1957	
Borough Road	LC&DR	1907	
Boroughbridge	NER	1950	
Borrobol Platform	Highland	1965	
Borrowash	Midland Counties Railway	1966	
Borwick	Furness and Midland Joint Railway	1960	
Boscarne Exchange Platform	British Railways	1967	
Boscombe	L&SWR	1965	
Bosley	North Staffordshire Railway	1960	
Bossall	Sand Hutton Light Railway	1930	
Botanic Gardens (Glasgow)	Caledonian	1939	
Botanic Gardens (Hull)	NER	1964	
Bothwell	NBR	1955	
Bothwell	Caledonian	1950	
Botolph's Bridge Halt	Romney, Hythe and Dymchurch Railway	1947	
Bott Lane Halt	L&YR	1956	
Bottesford South	L&NWR/GNR Joint Railway	1882	
Bottisham and Lode	GER	1962	
Boughrood and Llyswen	Cambrian Railways	1962	
Boughton (Nottinghamshire))	LD&ECR	1955	
Boughton Halt	GWR	1965	
Boulevard Recreation Ground	GCR/Grimsby and Immingham Electric Tramway	1961	
Bourne (Lincolnshire)	GNR	1959	
Bourne Bridge	Newmarket and Chesterford Railway	1851	
Bournemouth East	L&SWR	1885	
Bournemouth West	L&SWR	1965	
Bournville (Mon) Halt	GWR	1962	
Bourton-on-the-Water	GWR	1962	
Bovey	GWR	1959	
Bow (Devon)	L&SWR	1972	
Bow (London)	NLR	1944	
Bow & Bromley	London & Blackwall Railway	1850	
Bow Road	GER	1949	
Bow Street	Cambrian Railways	1965	new station opened 2021
Bowbridge Crossing Halt	GWR	1964	
Bowdon	Manchester South Junction and Altrincham Railway	1881	
Bower	Sutherland and Caithness Railway	1960	
Bowers	LNER	1951	
Bowes	NER	1962	
Bowhouse	NBR	1930	
Bowland	NBR	1953	
Bowling (West Yorkshire)	GNR	1895	
Bowling (Strathclyde)	Caledonian Railway	1951	
Bowling Junction (West Yorkshire)	L&Y	1951	
Bowness	Caledonian Railway	1921	
Box	GWR	1965	
Box (Mill Lane) Halt	GWR	1965	
Boxford	GWR	1960	
Boyces Bridge	GER	1928	

=== Br ===
Station (Town, unless in station name)	Rail company	Year closed	Notes
Braceborough Spa Halt	GNR	1951	
Brackenhills	L&AR	1930	
Brackley Central	GCR	1966	
Brackley Town	LNWR	1961	
Bradbury	NER	1950	
Braddan Halt	Isle of Man Railway	1968	
Bradfield	GER	1956	
Bradford Adolphus Street	Leeds, Bradford and Halifax Junction Railway	1867	
Bradford Exchange	L&YR/GNR	1973	
Bradford Peverell & Stratton Halt	GWR	1966	
Bradley (West Yorkshire)	LNWR	1950	
Bradley and Moxley	GWR	1915	
Bradley Fold	L&YR	1970	
Bradnop	North Staffordshire Railway	1935	
Bradwell	LNWR	1964	
Braeside Halt	North British Railway	1926	
Brafferton	NER	1950	
Braidwood	Caledonian Railway	1962	
Braithwaite	Cockermouth, Keswick and Penrith Railway	1966	
Bramber	LBSC	1966	
Brambledown Halt	SE&CR	1950	
Bramford	GER	1955	
Bramley and Wonersh	LBSC	1965	
Brampford Speke Halt	GWR	1963	
Brampton Fell	Newcastle and Carlisle Railway	1858	at or before this date
Brampton Halt (Staffordshire)	North Staffordshire Railway	1923	
Brampton Town	Brampton Railway/NER	1923	
Bramshot Halt	LSWR	1946	
Bramwith	South Yorkshire Railway	1866	
Brancepeth	NER	1964	
Brandlesholme Road Halt	L&YR	1952	
Brandon and Wolston	LNWR	1960	
Brandon Colliery	NER	1964	
Bransford Road	GWR	1965	
Branston (Staffordshire)	MR	1930	
Branston & Heighington (Lincolnshire)	Great Northern and Great Eastern Joint Railway	1958	
Branthwaite	Whitehaven, Cleator and Egremont Junction Railway	1931	
Brasted Halt	SER	1961	
Bratton Fleming	Lynton and Barnstaple Railway	1935	
Braughing	GER	1964	
Braunston London Road	LNWR	1958	
Braunston & Willoughby	GC	1957	
Braunton	LSWR	1970	
Brayton	Maryport and Carlisle Railway	1950	
Brayton Gates (Selby)	NER	1904	
Breadsall	GNR	1953	
Breamore	L&SWR	1964	
Brean Road Halt	GWR	1955	
Brechin	Caledonian Railway	1952	
Breck Road (Liverpool)	L&NWR	1948	
Brecon Free Street	Neath and Brecon Railway	1962	
Brecon (Mount Street)	Mid Wales Railway	1872	
Brecon (Watton)	Brecon and Merthyr Tydfil Junction Railway	1871	
Brecon Road (Abergavenny)	L&NWR	1958	
Bredicot	Midland Railway	1855	
Bredon	MR	1965	
Breidden	Shrewsbury and Welshpool Railway	1960	
Brendon Hill	West Somerset Mineral Railway	1898	
Brent (Devon)	SDR	1964	
Brent Knoll	B&ER	1971	
Brentford	GWR	1942	
Brentham for North Ealing and Greystoke Park	GWR	1947	
Brentor	L&SWR	1968	
Brettell Lane	GWR	1962	
Bricklayers' Arms	SER	1852	
Bridestowe	LSWR	1968	
Bridge	South Eastern Railway (UK)	1940	
Bridge of Allan	Caledonian Railway	1965	
Bridge of Dee	G&SWR	1949	
Bridge of Dun	Caledonian Railway	1967	
Bridge of Earn (1st)	NBR	1892	
Bridge of Earn (2nd)	NBR	1964	
Bridge of Weir	Bridge of Weir Railway	1983	
Bridge Street (Glasgow)	Caledonian Railway	1905	
Bridge Street (Northampton)	L&NWR	1964	
Bridge Street (Thrapston)	L&NWR	1964	
Bridge Street (Uttoxeter)	North Staffordshire Railway	1881	
Bridgefoot	Whitehaven, Cleator and Egremont Junction Railway	1931	
Bridgefoot Halt	GN of S	1964	
Bridgeford	Grand Junction Railway	1840	
Bridgehouses	Sheffield, Ashton-under-Lyne and Manchester Railway	1851	
Bridgend	Llynvi and Ogmore Railway	1873	
Bridgeton Central (also known as "Bridgeton Cross (Central)")	NBR	1979	
Bridgnorth	GWR	1963	reopened by SVR
Bridgwater North	Somerset and Dorset Joint Railway	1952	
Bridport (also "Bridport (Bradpole Road)")	Bridport Railway	1975	
Bridport (East Street)	Bridport Railway	1930	
Bridport (West Bay)	Bridport Railway	1930	
Brierley Hill	GWR	1962	
Briery Siding Halt	Cockermouth, Keswick & Penrith Railway	1958	
Brigham	LNWR	1966	
Brighouse	L&YR	1970	reopened 2000
Brightlingsea	GER	1964	
Brighton Road	MR	1941	
Brightside (Sheffield))	MR	1995	
Brill	Metropolitan Railway	1935	
Brill and Ludgershall	GWR	1963	
Brimington	GCR	1956	
Brimley Halt	GWR	1959	
Brimscombe	GWR	1964	
Brimscombe Bridge Halt	GWR	1964	
Brindley Heath	LM&SR	1959	
Brinkburn Halt	NBR	1952	
Brinklow	L&NWR	1957	
Brinkworth	GWR	1961	
Brinscall	L&YR/LU Joint Railway	1960	
Brisco	Lancaster and Carlisle Railway	1852	
Brislington	GWR	1959	
Bristol Road (Somerset)	Weston, Clevedon and Portishead Railway	1940	
Bristol Road (Stonehouse)	MR	1965	
Bristol St Philips	Midland Railway	1953	
Bristol Temple Meads-terminus station	GWR/MR Joint Railway	1965	
Britannia	L&YR	1917	
Britannia Bridge	L&NWR	1858	
Britannia Halt (Kingswear)	GWR	1988	
Britannia Points Halt	Romney, Hythe and Dymchurch Railway	1930	
British Museum	Central London Railway	1933	
British Rhondda Halt	GWR	1911	
Briton Ferry	GWR	1964	reopened 1994
Briton Ferry East	Rhondda and Swansea Bay Railway	1935	
Briton Ferry Road	GWR	1936	
Briton Ferry West	GWR	1935	
Brixham	GWR	1963	
Brixton Road (Devon)	GWR	1947	
Brixworth	L&NWR	1960	
Brize Norton and Bampton	GWR	1962	
Broad Clyst	L&SWR	1966	
Broad Marston Halt	GWR	1916	
Broad Street (London)	North London Railway	1986	
Broadfield	L&YR	1970	
Broadheath (Altrincham)	LNWR	1962	
Broadley	L&YR	1947	
Broadsands Halt	Great Western Railway	1929	
Broadstone (Dorset)	L&SWR	1966	
Broadstone (Somerset)	Weston, Clevedon and Portishead Railway	1940	
Broadway (Worcestershire)	GWR	1960	
Brock	L&PJR	1939	
Brocketsbrae	Caledonian Railway	1951	
Brockford and Wetheringsett	Mid-Suffolk Light Railway	1952	
Brocklebank Dock	Liverpool Overhead Railway	1956	
Brocklesby	Great Central Railway	1993	
Brockley Lane	LC&DR	1917	
Brockmoor Halt	GWR	1932	
Brockweir Halt	GWR	1959	
Brodie	Highland Railway	1965	
Bromborough Port	Lever Brothers	1929	
Bromfield (Cumbria)	Caledonian Railway	1921	
Bromfield (Shropshire)	Shrewsbury and Hereford Joint Railway	1958	
Bromford Bridge	Birmingham and Derby Junction Railway	1965	
Bromham and Rowde Halt	GWR	1966	
Bromley Halt	GWR	1932	
Brompton	NER	1965	
Brompton Road	Great Northern, Piccadilly and Brompton Railway	1934	
Brompton Road Halt	Catterick Military Rly	1964	
Bromshall	North Staffordshire Railway	1865	
Bromyard	GWR	1964	
Bronwydd Arms	GWR	1965	reopened 1978 by Gwili Railway
Brook Street Halt	GWR	1915	
Brookfield (Cumbria)	Maryport and Carlisle Railway	1845	
Brookhay	South Staffordshire Railway	1849	
Brookland Halt	SER	1967	
Brooksby	MR	1961	
Brookwood Cemetery stations	London Necropolis Company	1941	
Broom Junction	MR	1962	
Broomfield Junction Halt	Caledonian Railway	1877	
Broomhill (Highland)	Highland Railway	1965	
Broomhill (Northumberland)	NER	1930	
Broomhouse	NBR	1927	
Broomieknowe	NBR	1951	
Broomielaw	NER	1964	
Broomlee	NBR	1933	
Brotton	NER	1960	
Broughton (Lancashire)	Lancaster and Preston Junction Railway	1840	
Broughton (Borders)	Caledonian Railway	1950	
Broughton and Bretton	LNWR	1962	
Broughton Astley	MR	1962	
Broughton Cross	LNWR	1942	
Broughton Gifford Halt	GWR	1955	
Broughton Lane (Sheffield)	Manchester, Sheffield and Lincolnshire Railway	1956	
Broughton Skeog	Portpatrick and Wigtownshire Joint Railway	1885	
Broughton-in-Furness (1st)	Furness Railway	1859	
Broughton-in-Furness (2nd)	Furness Railway	1958	
Broughty Ferry Pier	NBR/DA Joint Railway	1887	
Browndown Halt	LSWR	1930	
Brownhills	LNWR	1965	
Brownhills Watling Street	Midland Railway	1930	
Broxburn	EGR/NBR Joint Railway	1849	
Broxton	LNWR	1957	
Brucklay	GNS	1965	
Brunswick	Cheshire Lines Committee	1874	
Brunswick (Harrogate)	North Eastern Railway (UK)	1862	
Brunswick Dock	Liverpool Overhead Railway	1956	
Brymbo	GWR	1950	
Brymbo	Great Central Railway	1917	
Brymbo West Crossing Halt	GWR	1931	
Bryn (Neath Port Talbot)	Port Talbot Railway and Docks	1933	
Bryn Teifi	GWR	1965	
Brynamman East	MR	1950	
Brynamman West	GWR	1958	
Bryncelynog Halt	GWR	1960	
Bryngwyn (Gwynedd)	North Wales Narrow Gauge Railway	1914	
Bryngwyn Halt (Powys)	Cambrian Railways	1965	
Brynkir	LNWR	1964	
Brynmawr	LNWR	1962	
Brynmenyn	GWR	1958	
Brynmill	Swansea and Mumbles Railway	1960	

=== Bu ===
Station (Town, unless in station name)	Rail company	Year closed	Notes
Bubwith	NER	1954	
Buchanan Street, Glasgow	Caledonian Railway	1966	
Buchanstone	GNoS	1866	
Buchlyvie	NBR	1951	
Buckden	MR	1959	
Buckfastleigh	GWR	1958	reopened by DVLR
Buckhaven	NBR	1955	
Buckhill Colliery Halt	Cleator and Workington Junction Railway	1923	
Buckie	GNoS	1968	
Buckie	Highland Railway	1915	
Buckingham	LNWR	1964	
Buckley	WMCQ/GCR Joint Railway	1895	
Bucknall and Northwood	North Staffordshire Railway	1956	
Buckpool	GNoS	1960	
Bucksburn	GNoS	1956	
Buddon renamed Buddon Siding	Dundee and Arbroath Railway	1957	
Bude	LSWR	1966	
Budleigh Salterton	L&SWR	1967	
Buildwas	GWR	1963	
Builth Road Low Level	Cambrian Railways	1962	
Builth Wells	Cambrian Railways	1962	
Buittle	GSWR	1894	
Bulford	LSWR	1952	
Bulkington	LNWR	1931	
Bullers o' Buchan Halt	GNoS	1932	
Bullgill	Maryport and Carlisle Railway	1960	
Bullo Cross Halt	GWR	1958	
Bulverhythe (St Leonards)	LBSC	1846	
Bulwell Common	GCR	1963	
Bulwell Forest	GNR	1929	
Bulwell Hall Halt	GCR	1930	
Bulwell Market	MR	1964	
Bunchrew	Highland Railway	1960	
Bungalow Town Halt renamed Shoreham Airport	LB&SCR	1940	
Bungay	GER	1953	
Buntingford	GER	1964	
Burdale	NER	1950	
Burdett Road	GER	1941	
Burghclere	GWR	1960	
Burghead (1st)	Highland Railway	1892	
Burghead (2nd)	Highland Railway	1931	
Burgh-by-Sands	NBR	1964	
Burgh-le-Marsh	GNR	1970	
Burlescombe	GWR	1964	
Burlington Road Halt (Blackpool)	Preston and Wyre Joint Railway	1939	
Burlish Halt	GWR	1970	
Burmarsh Road	RH&DR	1950	reopened for "limited" use 1977-2015
Burn Halt	GWR	1963	
Burn Naze Halt	Preston and Wyre Joint Railway	1970	
Burnbank	NBR	1952	
Burngullow	GWR	1931	
Burnley Thorneybank	L&YR	1866	
Burnham Market	GER	1952	
Burnham-on-Sea	S&DJR	1951	
Burnhill	NER	1939	
Burnmouth	NBR	1962	
Burrator and Sheepstor Halt	GWR	1956	
Burrelton	CR	1956	
Burrington	GWR	1931	
Burry Port	Burry Port and Gwendraeth Valley Railway	1953	
Burslem	North Staffordshire Railway	1964	
Burston	GER	1966	
Burton Agnes	NER	1970	
Burton and Holme	L&NWR	1950	
Burton Dassett Halt	East and West Junction Railway	1946	
Burton Latimer for Isham	MR	1950	
Burton Point	GCR	1955	
Burton Salmon	York and North Midland Railway	1959	
Burwarton Halt	Cleobury Mortimer and Ditton Priors Light Railway	1938	
Burwell	GER	1962	
Bury Bolton Street	L&YR	1980	reopened 1987 by East Lancs Rly Society
Bury Knowsley Street	L&YR	1970	
Bury St Edmunds Eastgate	GER	1909	
Bushbury	L&NWR	1912	
Bute Street (Luton)	GNR	1965	
Butler's Hill	GNR	1931	
Butterley	MR	1947	reopened by Midland Rly Trust 1981
Butterton	North Staffordshire Railway	1934	
Buttington	Cambrian Railways	1960	
Butts Lane Halt	L&YR	1938	
Buxton Lamas	GER	1952	
Buxton Midland	MR	1967	
Buxworth	MR	1958	

=== By ===
Station (Town, unless in station name)	Rail company	Year closed	Notes
Byers Green (1st)	NER	1867	
Byers Green (2nd)	NER	1885	
Byers Green (3rd)	NER	1939	
Byfield	East and West Junction Railway	1952	
Byker	NER	1954	
