= Wichnor Junction railway station =

Former railway station in England

Wichnor Junction

General information
- Location: Wichnor, Lichfield; England
- Coordinates: 52.7437°N 1.7115°W

Other information
- Status: Disused

History
- Original company: South Staffordshire Railway and Midland Railway
- Pre-grouping: London and North Western Railway and Midland Railway

Key dates
- 1855: Opened
- 1877: Closed to passengers
Location

Wichnor Junction railway station was a short-lived station in Staffordshire from 1855 to 1877.

== History ==
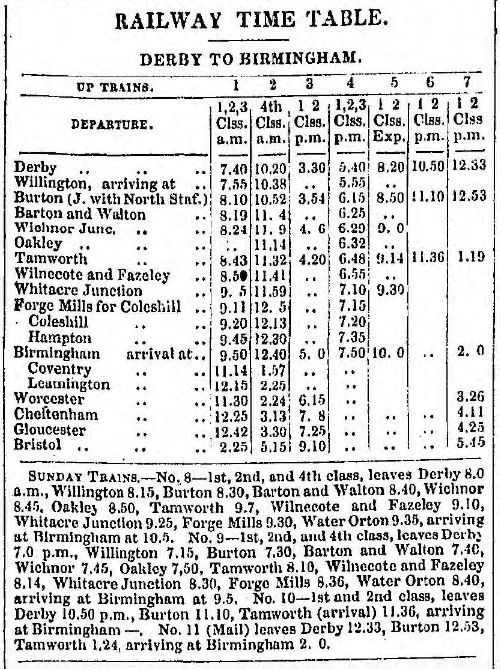
Derby to Birmingham timetable for 1856 from the Derby Mercury 10 September 1856

The South Staffordshire Railway opened their South Staffordshire line from Walsall to Wichnor Junction for passenger traffic on 9 April 1849. Initially they had an agreement with the Midland Railway for running powers over the line through to Burton upon Trent, but a deterioration in relations in 1853 led to the Midland revoking the running powers forcing the construction of a new station at Wichnor for the interchange of passengers and goods.

The London and North Western Railway took over the South Staffordshire line from early 1861. Later that year the station was the scene of a dispute between the two companies as reported in the Morning Post of 9 November 1861:

The leviathans of the railway world, the London and North-Western and the Midland Companies, had a sharp contest last week for a price of no mean order - all the traffic from Burton-upon-Trent, amounting altogether to 300,000 tons annually. Hitherto the Midland Company has enjoyed the exclusive right of entry into Burton, but running powers having been obtained last session by the London and North-Western Company over the Midland branch from the Wichnor junction of the South Staffordshire line, on Friday last the North-Western Company announced their intention of running into Burton. The Midland officials lost no time in sending a large staff of navvies and two powerful engines, with instructions to remove the rails rather than allow the entry of a rival on their pet goods station. On the North-Western train approaching, the navvies set to work with a will, and half a dozen rails were soon raised, thus placing the new comers hors de combat. Their train ran back to Lichfield for instructions, and was about to return with an army of platelayers and labourers to contest the disputed ground when a telegram was received from the Midland officials at Derby, authorising the London and North-Western trains entering Burton. This is a great concession for the latter company, as the Midland having now an independent route into London, much of the traffic hitherto going south (viâ Rugby), and north (viâ Crewe), would have been diverted viâ the Great Northern and Lancashire and Yorkshire Lines respectively. The new branch lines of the London and North-Western Company have been made on land purchased (at an enormous cost) from the Marquis of Anglesea, and Messrs. Samuel Allsopp and Sons, the eminent brewers of that town.

Gradually relations improved and running powers for the LNWR were re-instated. By 1877 the station was no longer needed for passenger traffic, the station master moved to Croxall and from 8 April 1878 the remaining staff at Wichnor Junction were placed under his supervision.

== Route ==
Preceding station	Disused railways	Following station
Alrewas; Line open, station closed	South Staffordshire Railway; Wichnor to Dudley route	Barton and Walton
