= Blackhall Colliery railway station =

Former railway station in County Durham, England

Blackhall Colliery
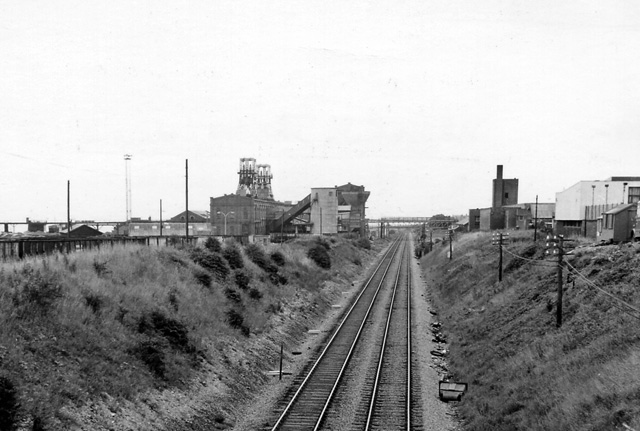
- Site of Blackhall Colliery station in September 1970.

General information
- Location: Blackhall Colliery, County Durham; England
- Coordinates: 54.7505°N 1.2917°W
- Platforms: 2

Other information
- Status: Disused

History
- Original company: LNER
- Post-grouping: LNER; British Rail (North Eastern)

Key dates
- 24 July 1936: Station opened
- 4 May 1964: Station closed
Location

Blackhall Colliery railway station served the village of Blackhall Colliery in County Durham, North East England. It was located on the Durham Coast Line, north of Blackhall Rocks and south of Horden.

== History ==
The North Eastern Railway opened their new coastal line linking the former Londonderry (Seaham to Sunderland) Railway at Seaham and the former Hartlepool Dock and Railway at Hart to passenger traffic on 1 April 1905. This line was built, primarily, to avoid the steep gradients of the inland route at Ryhope Bank and Hesleden but also provided access to the newly developed collieries along the Durham Coast.

However, when the line was opened, the NER chose to build the station to serve the Blackhalls at what became Blackhall Rocks as sinking of the colliery at Blackhall did not begin until 1909 and thus the main traffic that was expected to use the station was that of tourists visiting the caves at Blackhall Rocks. This meant that the village that developed to serve the colliery was left some distance from their nearest railway station.

Eventually, the London and North Eastern Railway (LNER), who had absorbed the NER in 1923, agreed to open an additional station to serve Blackhall Colliery. Construction of the station began on 6 July 1936 and was opened, just 18 days later, on 24 July 1936 by the then manager of Blackhall Colliery and county councillor Ernest Chicken who then proceeded to purchase the first ticket from the station ticket office.

The station was recommended for closure in the Beeching Report and was duly closed on 4 May 1964 when all stopping services on the line between Sunderland and Hartlepool were withdrawn. Passenger services continue to pass through the site of the station but run non-stop between Seaham and Hartlepool.

Preceding station	Historical railways	Following station
Blackhall Rocks; Line open; station closed	London and North Eastern Railway; Durham Coast Line	Horden; Line open; station closed
