= Standon Bridge railway station =

Disused railway station in Staffordshire, England

Standon Bridge

General information
- Location: Standon, Stafford; England
- Coordinates: 52.9134°N 2.2587°W
- Grid reference: SJ826351

Other information
- Status: Disused

History
- Original company: Grand Junction Railway
- Pre-grouping: London and North Western Railway
- Post-grouping: London, Midland and Scottish Railway

Key dates
- 1837: Station opens
- 4 February 1952: Station closed
Location

Standon Bridge railway station was a railway station in Standon, approximately 4 miles (6.4 km) west of Stone, Staffordshire. The station closed on 4 February 1952, the same day as Whitmore railway station 4 miles further north.

The station is close to Mill Meece Pumping Station, an early 20th-century preserved steam-powered water pumping station built by Staffordshire Potteries Waterworks Company. During installation of a second steam engine in 1926–27, parts were delivered to Standon Bridge railway station and transferred by horse and cart to the pumping station.

The station is also near to Swynnerton Army training camp, a large former Royal Ordnance Factory.

Preceding station	Historical railways	Following station
Norton Bridge; Line open, station closed	London and North Western Railway; Grand Junction Railway	Whitmore; Line open, station closed
