= Woodside (Aberdeen) railway station =

Disused railway station in Woodside, Aberdeen

Woodside (Aberdeen)
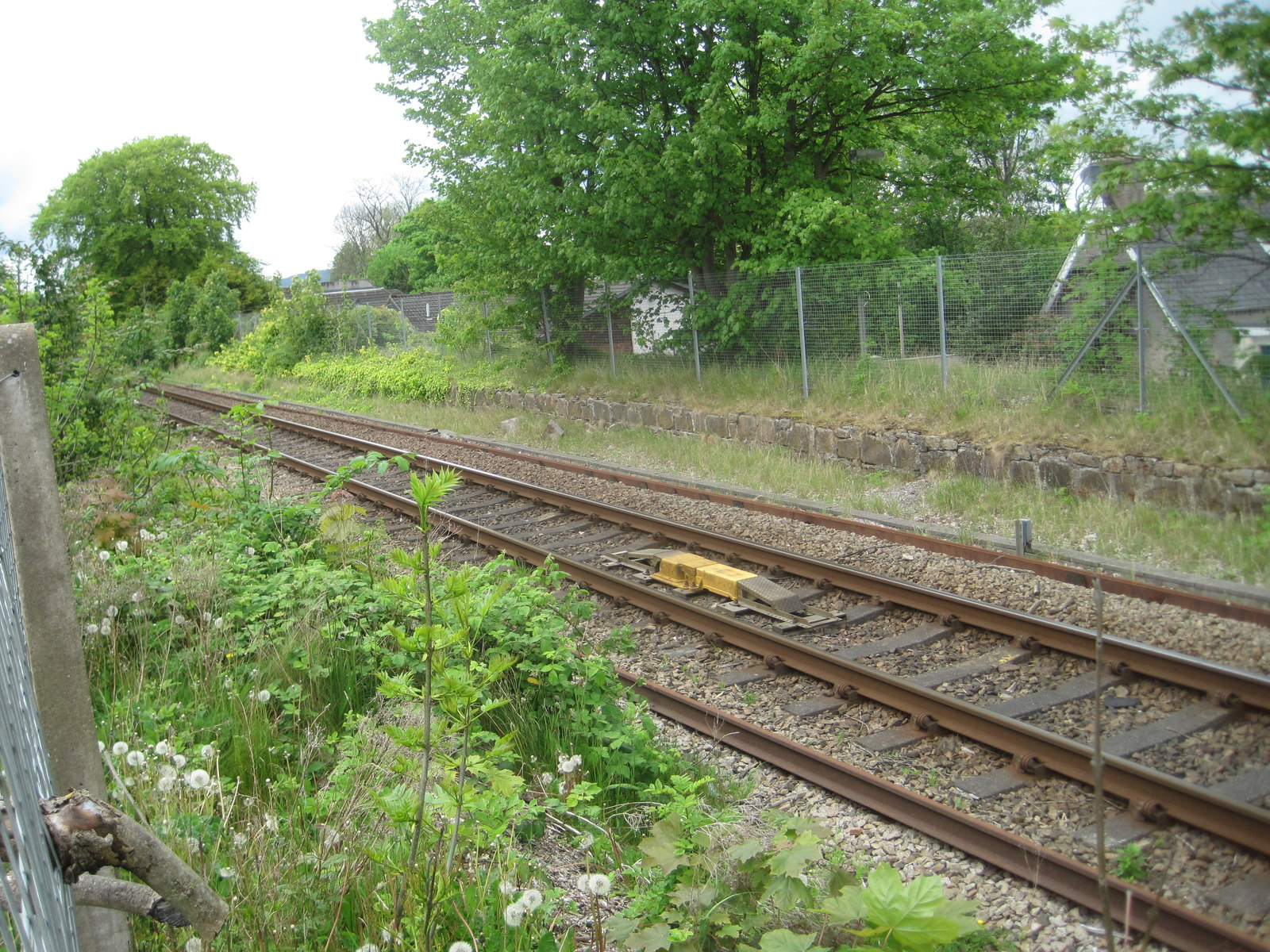
- The site of the station in 2017

General information
- Location: Woodside, Aberdeenshire; Scotland
- Coordinates: 57.1729°N 2.1311°W
- Grid reference: NJ921091
- Platforms: 2

Other information
- Status: Disused

History
- Original company: Great North of Scotland Railway
- Pre-grouping: Great North of Scotland Railway
- Post-grouping: LNER

Key dates
- 1 January 1858: Opened
- 5 April 1937: Closed
Location

Woodside (Aberdeen) railway station served the parish of Woodside, Aberdeen, Scotland from 1858 to 1937 on the Great North of Scotland Railway.

== History ==
The station opened on 1 January 1858 by the Great North of Scotland Railway. A signal box opened in 1887 but it closed in 1912. It reopened shortly after but closed again in 1928. The station closed to both passengers and goods traffic on 5 April 1937.

Preceding station	Historical railways	Following station
Don Street; Line open, station closed	Great North of Scotland Railway	Persley; Line open, station closed
