= Persley railway station =

Disused railway station in Persley, Aberdeenshire

Persley

General information
- Location: Persley, Aberdeenshire; Scotland
- Coordinates: 57.1739°N 2.1479°W
- Platforms: 2

Other information
- Status: Disused

History
- Original company: Great North of Scotland Railway
- Post-grouping: LNER

Key dates
- 1 June 1903: Opened as Persley
- 16 July 1926: Name changed to Persley Halt
- 5 April 1937: Closed
Location

Persley railway station served the area of Persley, Aberdeenshire, Scotland, from 1903 to 1937 on the Great North of Scotland Railway.

== History ==
The station was opened on 1 June 1903 by the Great North of Scotland Railway. The station building was on the eastbound platform. 'Halt' was added to its name on 16 July 1926. The station closed on 5 April 1937 with the withdrawal of the suburban train service.

Preceding station	Historical railways	Following station
Woodside (Aberdeen); Line open, station closed	Great North of Scotland Railway	Bucksburn; Line open, station closed
