= Stoneywood railway station =

Disused railway station in Stoneywood, Aberdeenshire

Stoneywood
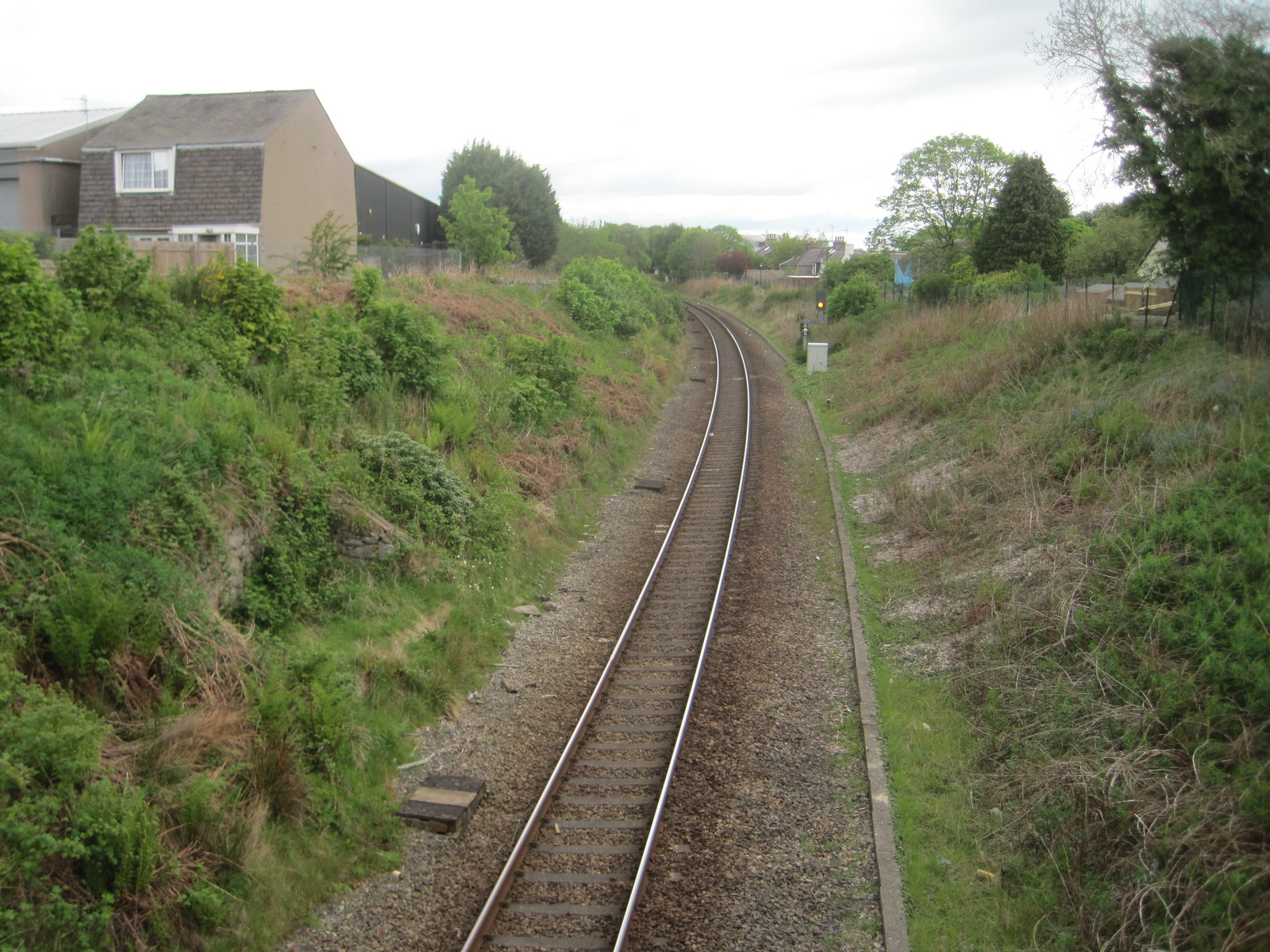
- The site of the station, looking north towards Dyce, in 2017

General information
- Location: Stoneywood, Aberdeen; Scotland
- Coordinates: 57.1906°N 2.182°W
- Grid reference: NJ891111
- Platforms: 2

Other information
- Status: Disused

History
- Original company: Great North of Scotland Railway
- Pre-grouping: Great North of Scotland Railway
- Post-grouping: London and North Eastern Railway

Key dates
- 1 July 1887: Opened
- 5 April 1937: Closed
Location

Stoneywood railway station served the village of Stoneywood, Aberdeen, Scotland from 1887 to 1937 on the Great North of Scotland Railway.

== History ==
The station opened on 1 July 1887 by the Great North of Scotland Railway. It closed to both passengers and goods traffic on 5 April 1937.

| Preceding station | Historical railways | Following station |
|---|---|---|
| Bankhead; Line open, station closed | Great North of Scotland Railway | Dyce; Line open, station open |
