= Briery Siding Halt railway station =

Disused railway station in Briery, Cumbria

Briery Siding Halt
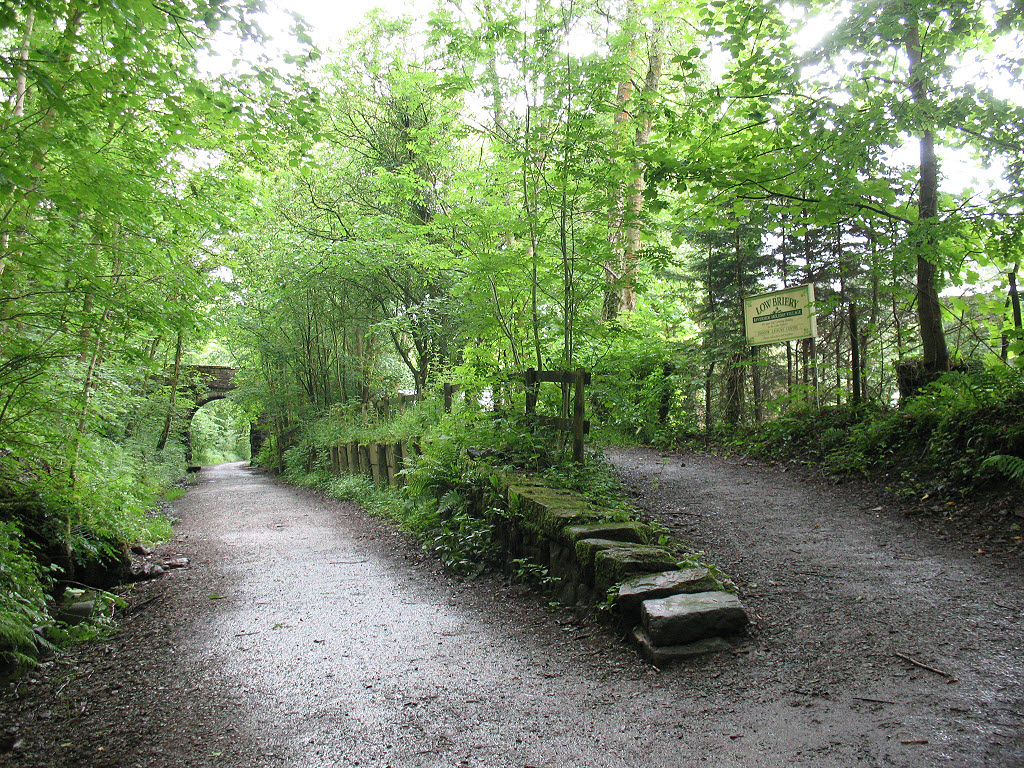
- The site of the station in 2011

General information
- Location: Briery, Cumbria; England
- Coordinates: 54.607°N 3.1069°W
- Grid reference: NY286241
- Platforms: 1

Other information
- Status: Disused

History
- Original company: London, Midland and Scottish Railway
- Post-grouping: London, Midland and Scottish Railway; British Railways (London Midland Region)

Key dates
- After 1922: Opened
- 17 November 1958: Closed
Location

Briery Siding Halt railway station served the workers of Briery Bobbin Mill in Briery, in the historical county of Cumberland, England, from 1922 to 1958 on the Cockermouth, Keswick and Penrith Railway.

== History ==
The station opened after 1922 by the London, Midland and Scottish Railway. It was situated west of the bridge that led to what is now Low Briery Holiday Park. It was also known as Briery Bobbin Mill Halt. The platform was rebuilt in the 1930s due to the original decaying. The mill closed in 1958 so the station soon followed suit, closing on 17 November 1958. The siding continued to be used, although only being used for coal, until 1959. The platform still exists today.

Preceding station	Disused railways	Following station
Keswick; Line and station closed	London, Midland and Scottish Railway; Cockermouth, Keswick and Penrith Railway	Threlkeld; Line and station closed
