= Whitmore railway station =

Disused railway station in Staffordshire, England

Whitmore

General information
- Location: West of Whitmore, Newcastle-under-Lyme; England
- Coordinates: 52.9609°N 2.3058°W
- Grid reference: SJ795404
- Platforms: 4

Other information
- Status: Disused

History
- Original company: Grand Junction Railway
- Pre-grouping: London and North Western Railway
- Post-grouping: London, Midland and Scottish Railway

Key dates
- 4 July 1837: Opened
- 4 February 1952: Closed
Location

Whitmore was a station serving the village of Whitmore, Staffordshire.

== History ==
The station opened onto the Grand Junction Railway in 1837 when the line itself was built. It opened in Baldwin's Gate village near the edge of Whitmore Parish. This station brought in huge numbers of people as it also served as the nearest station to Newcastle-under-Lyme and the Potteries until the Stoke line opened in 1848.

=== Coronation Scot record ===
On 29 June 1937 the Coronation Scot engine created a world record of 114 miles per hour (183 km/h) while travelling through Whitmore station giving it world-wide fame.

== Buildings and location ==
Whitmore station was located off Whitmore Road in Baldwins Gate village. The site of the station can still be seen when the tracks part, showing a grassy area were platforms could have been. A more likely location of the platform is where a siding of road comes down near the track, this could have led to a platform. One station building can still be seen: a building, next to a bridge spanning the track, is in the definite style of ticket office. This means that passengers could buy tickets, then wait or read information before heading down a side road to the platform.

=== Impact of the station ===
The station itself was one of the key factors affecting how Baldwins Gate village was laid out. Only two shops are in the village, and they are both situated next to the line. The line led to land being sold on each side, so the village expanded, and its appearance today is because of the impact of the railway and station.

Preceding station	Historical railways	Following station
Standon Bridge; Line open, station closed	London and North Western Railway; Grand Junction Railway	Madeley (Staffordshire); Line open, station closed
