= Blackhall Rocks railway station =

Disused railway station in Blackhall Colliery, County Durham

Blackhall Rocks
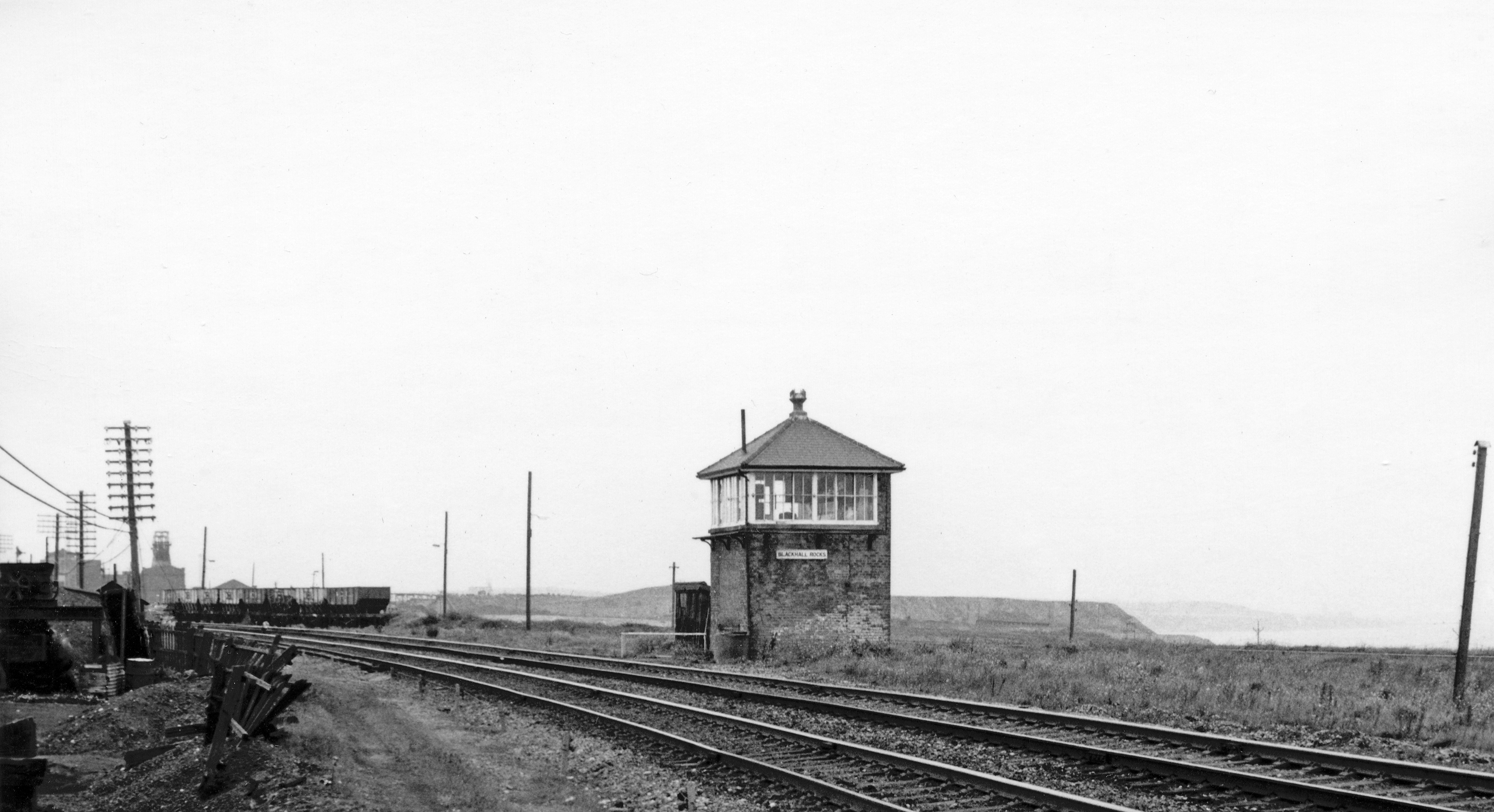
- The northern end of the site of the station in 1970.

General information
- Location: Blackhall Rocks, County Durham; England
- Coordinates: 54.7429°N 1.2761°W
- Grid reference: NZ467389
- Platforms: 2

Other information
- Status: Disused

History
- Original company: North Eastern Railway
- Pre-grouping: North Eastern Railway
- Post-grouping: London and North Eastern Railway; British Railways (North Eastern Region)

Key dates
- July 1907: Opened
- 4 January 1960: Closed to passengers
- 7 December 1964: Closed completely
Location

Blackhall Rocks was one of two railway stations to have served the Blackhalls in County Durham, North East England, and was a stop on the Durham Coast Line. The station was poorly sited for the village that grew around Blackhall Colliery in the years following its opening and, after the opening of the more conveniently sited Blackhall Colliery station in 1936, it came to primarily serve the more southerly village of Blackhall Rocks.

== History ==
On 1 April 1905, the North Eastern Railway opened a new coastal line to link together the former Londonderry (Seaham to Sunderland) Railway at Seaham and former Hartlepool Dock and Railway at Hart. This line was built, primarily, to avoid the steep gradients of the older inland route at Ryhope and Hesleden Banks but also provided access to the newly developing collieries of the Durham Coast.

In July 1907, the NER added a station to serve the Blackhalls at what would become Blackhall Rocks. The first station was likely sited here as the sinking of Blackhall Colliery would not begin until 1909 and thus, at the time, it was anticipated that the station would primarily be used by tourists visiting the caves at Blackhall Rocks. This meant that the village that developed to serve the colliery was left some distance from their nearest railway station. Between the summer and 1 October 1919, the station was only served on Wednesdays and Saturdays.

The NER became part of the London and North Eastern Railway as part of the 1923 grouping and, on 24 July 1936, that company opened an additional station, approximately 1 mile (1.6 km) to the north, to serve the colliery village. Although this meant that the station ceased to primarily serve that village, a community had begun to grow close to Blackhall Rocks station during the 1920s, making it not entirely redundant. LNER lines in the North East came under the control of the North Eastern Region of British Railways following its nationalisation in 1948. By this time, passenger and goods traffic across the country was in decline and this was the case for Blackhall station, which closed to passengers on 4 January 1960 and then to all traffic on 7 December 1964.

Passenger services continue to pass through the site of the station, but the only station between Seaham and Hartlepool to have been reopened (as of 2021) is at Horden.

Preceding station	Historical railways	Following station
Hart; Line open; station closed	London and North Eastern Railway; Durham Coast Line	Blackhall Colliery; Line open; station closed
