= Vicarage Crossing Halt railway station =

Former railway station in Wrexham, Wales

Vicarage Crossing Halt

General information
- Location: Minera, Wrexham County Borough; Wales
- Coordinates: 53.0601°N 3.0882°W
- Grid reference: SJ272520
- Platforms: 1

Other information
- Status: Disused

History
- Original company: Great Western Railway
- Pre-grouping: Great Western Railway
- Post-grouping: Great Western Railway

Key dates
- 1 May 1905: Opened
- 1 January 1917: Closed
- 2 April 1917: Reopened
- 1 January 1931: Closed
Location

Vicarage Crossing Halt railway station was a station in Minera, Wrexham, Wales. The station was opened on 1 May 1905 and closed on 1 January 1931.

Preceding station	Disused railways	Following station
Berwig Halt; Line and station closed	Great Western Railway; Wrexham and Minera Railway	Coed Poeth; Line and station closed
