= Basford railway station =

Disused railway station in Cheshire, England

Basford

General information
- Location: Cheshire East; England
- Coordinates: 53.058°N 2.416°W
- Grid reference: SJ 722 513

Other information
- Status: Disused

History
- Opened: by 8 August 1838
- Closed: 1 July 1875
- Original company: Grand Junction Railway
- Pre-grouping: London and North Western Railway
Location

Basford railway station was a station on the Grand Junction Railway serving the villages of Basford, Hough and Weston in Cheshire, England.

== History ==
On 4 July 1837 the Grand Junction Railway (GJR) opened its line between a temporary station at Vauxhall, Birmingham and Warrington, where it met the already opened line to Newton (on the Liverpool and Manchester Railway). Most of the stations on the line opened at the same time but Basford was a late addition, opening sometime before 8 August 1838 when it was first mentioned in Company minutes. The station does not feature in the company's first (1837) timetable. Whishaw (1842) calls the station Basford Heath.

The Osborne's guide (2nd edition, published in 1838) says "This station has been lately added, for the convenience of the neighbouring country: and there is a large house erected close by, which is intended for an inn. The road to the right leads to the Potteries, that to the left for Nantwich". (Note: The author was describing the route from South to North, so the road to the right went towards the East.) Webster (1972) also notes that the station was "added almost as an afterthought when it was seen that there was sufficient demand from the neighbouring countryside". The precise location of the station is provided by Mogg (1840) who also notes that "its continuance is doubtful and on that account not worthy of notice", and Cruchley's 1856 Railway & Telegraph Map of Cheshire shows it located where the turnpike from Newcastle-under-Lyme to Nantwich crosses the railway.

In 1838 the station saw two north-bound trains at 0853 and 1857, the trains going on to both Liverpool and Manchester, and two in the opposite direction at 0857 and 1857 going to Birmingham.

The service level stayed much the same with two or three daily services in each direction stopping at the station (except on Sundays), the times changed occasionally, by 1855 the up services were at 1025 and 1934 and the down services at 0820, 1647 and 1901. (Note: Down trains usually headed away from the major conurbation, usually London, some railway companies ran 'up' to their headquarters location, in this case 'up' trains were going to Birmingham and 'down' trains to Crewe.)

The station closed on 1 July 1875; it was replaced by Betley Road.

Preceding station	Historical railways	Following station
Crewe; Line and station open	London and North Western Railway; Grand Junction Railway	Before 1875 Madeley; Line open, station closed From 1875 Betley Road; Line open, station closed

== Bibliography ==
- Bradshaw, George (1855). Bradshaw's General Railway and Steam Navigation Guide, for Great Britain and Ireland. Manchester: Bradshaw & Blacklock.
- Drake, James (1838). Drake's Road Book of the Grand Junction Railway (1838). Moorland Reprints. ISBN 0903485257.
- Hewitt, H.J. (1972). "Cruchley's Railway & Telegraphic Map of Cheshire 1856". The Building of Railways in Cheshire Down to 1860. E. J. Morten. Map bound in at rear of book. ISBN 978-0-901598-43-1.
- Osborne, E.C.; Osborne, W. (1838). Osbourne's guide to the Grand Junction, or Birmingham, Liverpool and Manchester Railway (2nd ed.). London: Simpkin, Marshall and Co.
- Mogg, Edward (1840). Mogg's Handbook for Railway Travellers, or, Real Iron-road Book : being an entirely original and accurate description of all the travellable railways (2nd ed.). Edward Mogg – via HathiTrust.
- Quick, Michael (2022) [2001]. Railway passenger stations in Great Britain: a chronology (PDF). version 5.04. Railway & Canal Historical Society. Archived from the original (PDF) on 25 November 2022.
- Simmons, Jack (1997). "'up' and 'down'". In Simmons, Jack; Biddle, Gordon (eds.). The Oxford Companion to British Railway History From 1603 to the 1990s (1st ed.). Oxford: Oxford University Press. p. 548. ISBN 0-19-211697-5.
- Webster, Norman W. (1972). Britain's First Trunk Line:The Grand Junction Railway. Adams & Dart. SBN 239 00105 2.
- Whishaw, Francis (1842) [1840]. The Railways of Great Britain and Ireland practically described and illustrated (2nd ed.). London: John Weale (1840 publisher - Simpkin, Marshall & Co.). OCLC 36383414.
