= Baldwin's Gate =

Village in Staffordshire, England

Coordinates: 52.9604°N 2.3063°W

- Location within Staffordshire
- OS grid reference: SJ795403
- District: Newcastle-under-Lyme
- Shire county: Staffordshire
- Region: West Midlands
- Country: England
- Sovereign state: United Kingdom
- Post town: Newcastle, Staffs
- Postcode district: ST5
- Dialling code: 01782
- Police: Staffordshire
- Fire: Staffordshire
- Ambulance: West Midlands
- UK Parliament: Stafford

Baldwin's Gate is a village in the Borough of Newcastle-under-Lyme in Staffordshire. The population details for the 2011 census can be found under Whitmore. There is a pub in the centre of the village called The Sheet Anchor, along with a Post Office & General Store, a primary school (Baldwin's Gate CE Primary School) and another small shop with a petrol station. There is also a Methodist church and just outside the village is Slater's Country Inn.

== Amenities ==
The Chipperfield Rifle Ranges are located quarter of a mile (400 metres) south-west of Baldwins Gate and are operated by Staffordshire Smallbore Rifle Association as the Staffordshire County Ranges, as well as serving as home range for Chipperfield Target Shooting Club. Whilst they were without a range of their own, the Chipperfield Ranges also hosted Market Drayton Rifle Club, who still use the site for outdoor shooting having acquired an independent indoor facility.

== Historical background ==
Historically, three main factors have influenced the position of and development of Baldwins Gate village. The building of the Grand Junction railway line in 1837, including Whitmore station (closed in 1952), gave rise to significant commercial activity, serving as it did Newcastle and the Potteries before the Stoke line was opened.

The sale by the Cavenagh-Mainwaring family in 1920 of a large parcel of land either side of the railway line allowed the village to develop and expand. The auction in 1921 by direction of the Marquis of Crewe of the 4,493 acres of Madeley Estate which included Baldwins Gate Farm (184 acres). The hamlet got its name from one of the properties on the main road where the occupant collected tolls from users of the road. At this time the village consisted of a handful of cottages in Coneygreave Lane, Moss Lane, Station Approach and beside the Main Road. The Methodist Chapel at the western end of the village was built in 1859. Station House, a Grade II listed building of particular note, built by Rowland Mainwaring in 1839, stands to this day next to the railway.
