= Dundee Ward Road railway station =

Disused railway station in Dundee, Scotland

Dundee Ward Road

General information
- Location: Dundee, Dundee; Scotland
- Coordinates: 56.4617°N 2.9764°W
- Grid reference: NO399303

Other information
- Status: Disused

History
- Original company: Dundee and Newtyle Railway

Key dates
- 3 April 1832: Opened as Dundee West Ward
- 1853: Name changed to Dundee Ward Road
- 10 June 1861: Closed
Location

Dundee Ward Road railway station served the city of Dundee, Scotland from 1832 to 1861 on the Dundee and Newtyle Railway.

== History ==
The station opened as Dundee West Ward on 3 April 1832 by the Dundee and Newtyle Railway. Its name was changed to Dundee Ward Road in 1853. The station closed to both passengers and goods traffic on 10 June 1861.

Preceding station	Disused railways	Following station
Back of Law; Line and station closed	Dundee and Newtyle Railway	Terminus
