= Mickle Trafford East railway station =

Former railway station in England

Mickle Trafford East

General information
- Location: Mickle Trafford, Cheshire West and Chester; England
- Coordinates: 53.2189°N 2.8292°W
- Grid reference: SJ446694
- Platforms: 2

Other information
- Status: Disused

History
- Original company: Cheshire Lines Committee
- Pre-grouping: Cheshire Lines Committee
- Post-grouping: Cheshire Lines Committee

Key dates
- 1 May 1875: Opened
- 12 February 1951: Closed to passengers
- 1 July 1963: Closed
Location

Mickle Trafford East railway station was located in Mickle Trafford, Cheshire, England. The station was opened by the Cheshire Lines Committee on 1 May 1875, closed to passengers on 12 February 1951 and closed completely on 1 July 1963 by the British Railways Board It was located where the CLC route to Chester Northgate passed close (and then over) to the Birkenhead Joint Railway line from Warrington Bank Quay - the latter also had its own station nearby, opened in 1889 and closed just a couple of months after Mickle Trafford East.

The buildings were demolished soon after closure and no trace now remains, though a single track remains in use by Mid-Cheshire Line trains between Chester and Manchester Piccadilly. These now join the former BJR line at Mickle Trafford Junction, as the former CLC line to Chester and on to the steelworks and paper mill at Shotton was finally closed in October 1992 (having latterly been used for freight traffic only to allow direct access to both plants from the north).

Preceding station	Disused railways	Following station
Chester Northgate; Line and station closed	Cheshire Lines Committee; Mid-Cheshire line	Barrow for Tarvin; Line open, station closed
