= Don Street railway station =

Disused railway station in Woodside, Aberdeenshire

Don Street
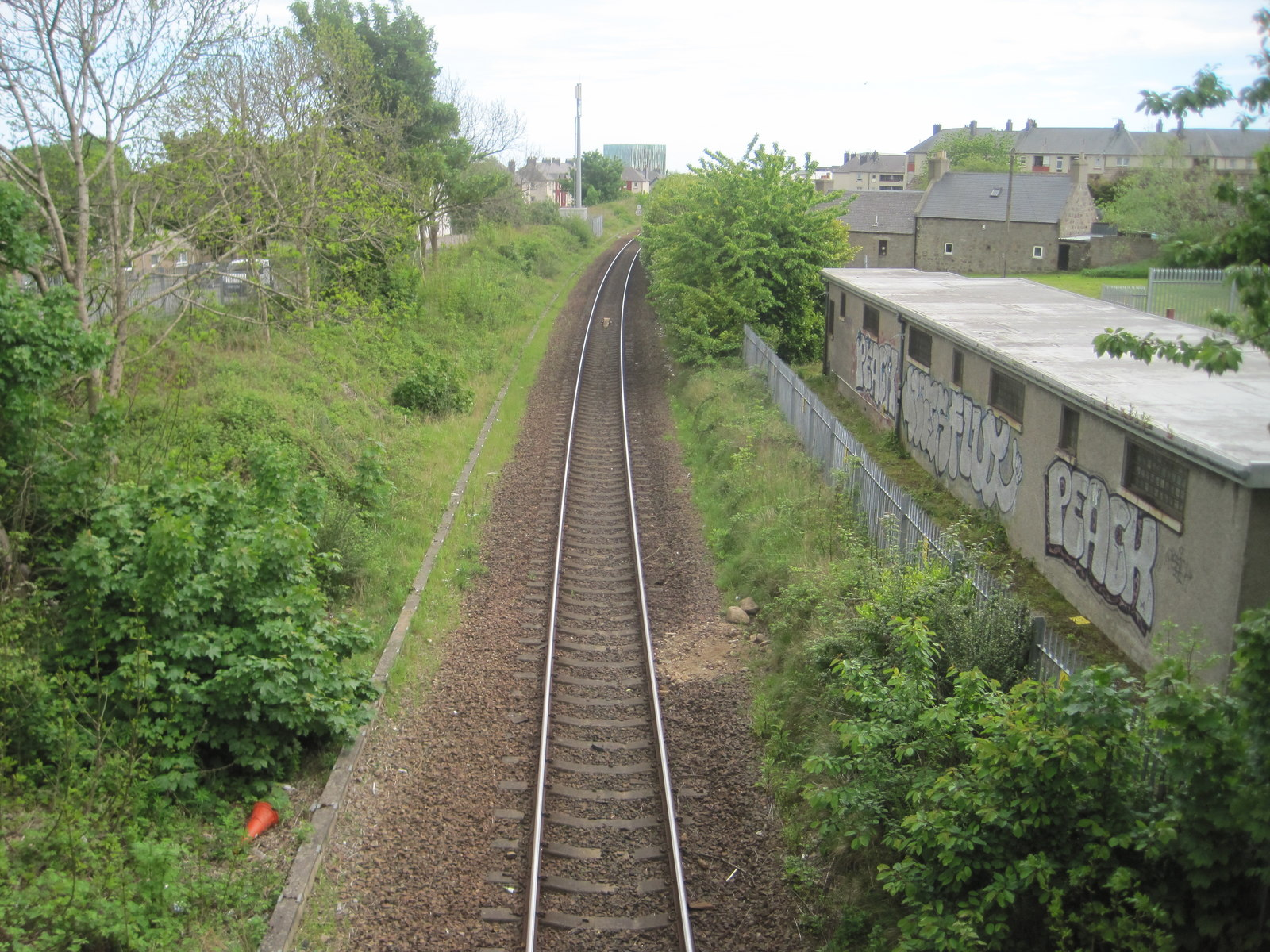
- The site of the station in 2017

General information
- Location: Woodside, Aberdeenshire; Scotland
- Coordinates: 57.1709°N 2.1209°W
- Grid reference: NJ927089
- Platforms: 2

Other information
- Status: Disused

History
- Original company: Great North of Scotland Railway
- Pre-grouping: Great North of Scotland Railway
- Post-grouping: LNER

Key dates
- 1 August 1887: Opened
- 28 February 1937 or 5 April 1937: Closed
Location

Don Street railway station served the parish of Woodside, Aberdeen, Scotland from 1887 to 1937 on the Great North of Scotland Railway.

== History ==
The station was opened on 1 August 1887 by the Great North of Scotland Railway and was a stop on the Aberdeen suburban rail service. The station closed to both passengers and goods traffic on 28 February 1937. 5 April 1937

Preceding station	Historical railways	Following station
Kittybrewster; Line open, station closed	Great North of Scotland Railway	Woodside; Line open, station closed
