= Coed Poeth railway station =

Disused railway station in Wales

Coed Poeth

General information
- Location: Coedpoeth, Wrexham County Borough; Wales
- Coordinates: 53.0624°N 3.0813°W
- Grid reference: SJ276522
- Platforms: 1

Other information
- Status: Disused

History
- Original company: Great Western Railway
- Pre-grouping: Great Western Railway
- Post-grouping: Great Western Railway

Key dates
- 15 November 1897: Opened
- 1 January 1931: Closed to passengers
- 2 November 1964: Closed
Location

Coed Poeth railway station was a station in Coedpoeth, Wrexham, Wales. The station was opened on 15 November 1897, closed to passengers on 1 January 1931 and closed completely on 2 November 1964.

Preceding station	Disused railways	Following station
Vicarage Crossing Halt; Line and station closed	Great Western Railway; Wrexham and Minera Railway	Pentresaeson Halt; Line and station closed
