= Pentresaeson Halt railway station =

Former railway station in Wrexham, Wales

Pentresaeson Halt

General information
- Location: Bwlchgwyn, Wrexham County Borough; Wales
- Coordinates: 53.0712°N 3.0793°W
- Grid reference: SJ278532
- Platforms: 1

Other information
- Status: Disused

History
- Original company: Great Western Railway
- Pre-grouping: Great Western Railway
- Post-grouping: Great Western Railway

Key dates
- 20 March 1905: Opened
- 1 January 1931: Closed
Location

Pentresaeson Halt railway station was a station in Bwlchgwyn, Wrexham, Wales. The station was opened on 20 March 1905 and closed on 1 January 1931.

Preceding station	Disused railways	Following station
Coed Poeth; Line and station closed	Great Western Railway; Wrexham and Minera Railway	Brymbo West Crossing Halt
