= Branston railway station =

Former railway station in Staffordshire, England

Branston
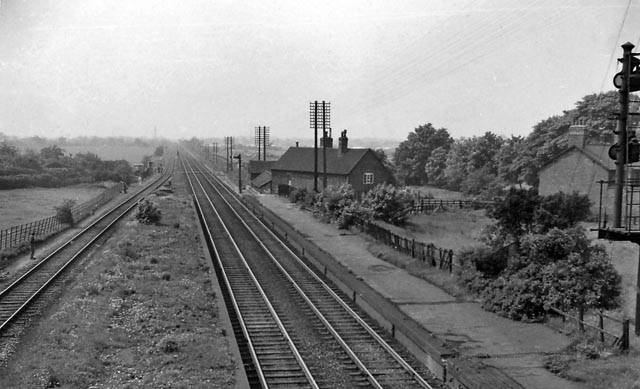
- The location in 1962

General information
- Location: Branston, East Staffordshire; England
- Coordinates: 52.7877°N 1.6653°W
- Grid reference: SK226211

Other information
- Status: Disused

History
- Original company: Midland Railway
- Pre-grouping: Midland Railway
- Post-grouping: London, Midland and Scottish Railway

Key dates
- 1 October 1889: Opened
- 22 September 1930: Closed
Location

Branston railway station was a railway station serving the village of Branston in Staffordshire.

== History ==
In 1887 local residents began to petition the Midland Railway for a station with the support of their local MP, Sydney Evershed. The railway company agreed and the station was subsequently opened on 1 October 1889.

It was situated between Tamworth and Burton upon Trent stations on the line originally built by the Birmingham and Derby Junction Railway.

With the arrival of local bus services, passenger numbers decreased and the last train called on Sunday 21 September 1930.

== Stationmasters ==
- James Collins 1889 - 1891 (afterwards station master at Haselour)
- J.J.W. Grundy 1891 - 1894 (afterwards station master at Wednesfield)
- G.W. King 1894 - 1898 (afterwards station master at Darfield)
- W. Lee 1898 - 1906

From 1906 a porter from Burton station was put in charge.

== Route ==
Preceding station	Disused railways	Following station
Barton and Walton; Line open, station closed	Midland Railway; Derby to Birmingham route	Burton on Trent; Line and station open
