= Back of Law railway station =

Disused railway station in Dundee, Scotland

Back of Law

General information
- Location: Dundee; Scotland
- Coordinates: 56.474°N 2.9856°W
- Grid reference: NO393317

Other information
- Status: Disused

History
- Original company: Dundee and Newtyle Railway

Key dates
- May 1833: Opened
- July 1855: Closed
Location
- Location within Dundee City council area Location within Scotland Location within the United Kingdom

Back of Law railway station served the city of Dundee, from 1833 to 1855 on the Dundee and Newtyle Railway.

== History ==
The station opened in May 1833 by the Dundee and Newtyle Railway. It was situated on the south side of Clepington Road. Trains only served here on Fridays. It closed in July 1855. The site is now occupied by a two-storey house.

| Preceding station | Historical railways | Following station |
|---|---|---|
| Baldovan; Line and station closed | Dundee and Newtyle Railway | Dundee Ward Road; Line and station closed |
