= Billing railway station =

Former railway station in Northamptonshire, England

Coordinates: 52.23847°N 0.80791°W

Billing
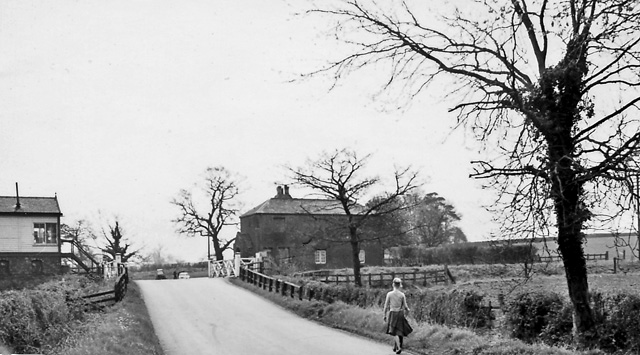
- View southward over level-crossing in 1965

General information
- Location: nr Cogenhoe, West Northamptonshire; England
- Grid reference: SP815607
- Platforms: 2

Other information
- Status: Disused

History
- Original company: London and Birmingham Railway
- Pre-grouping: London and North Western Railway
- Post-grouping: London, Midland and Scottish Railway; London Midland Region of British Railways

Key dates
- December 1845: Opened as Billing Road
- 1 April 1883: Station renamed Billing
- 6 October 1952: Station closed to passengers
- 1 June 1964: Station closed to goods
Location

Billing railway station is a former railway station in Northamptonshire on the former Northampton and Peterborough Railway which connected Peterborough and Northampton. In 1846 the line, along with the London and Birmingham, became part of the London and North Western Railway.

At grouping in 1923 it became part of the London Midland and Scottish Railway.

== The former service ==
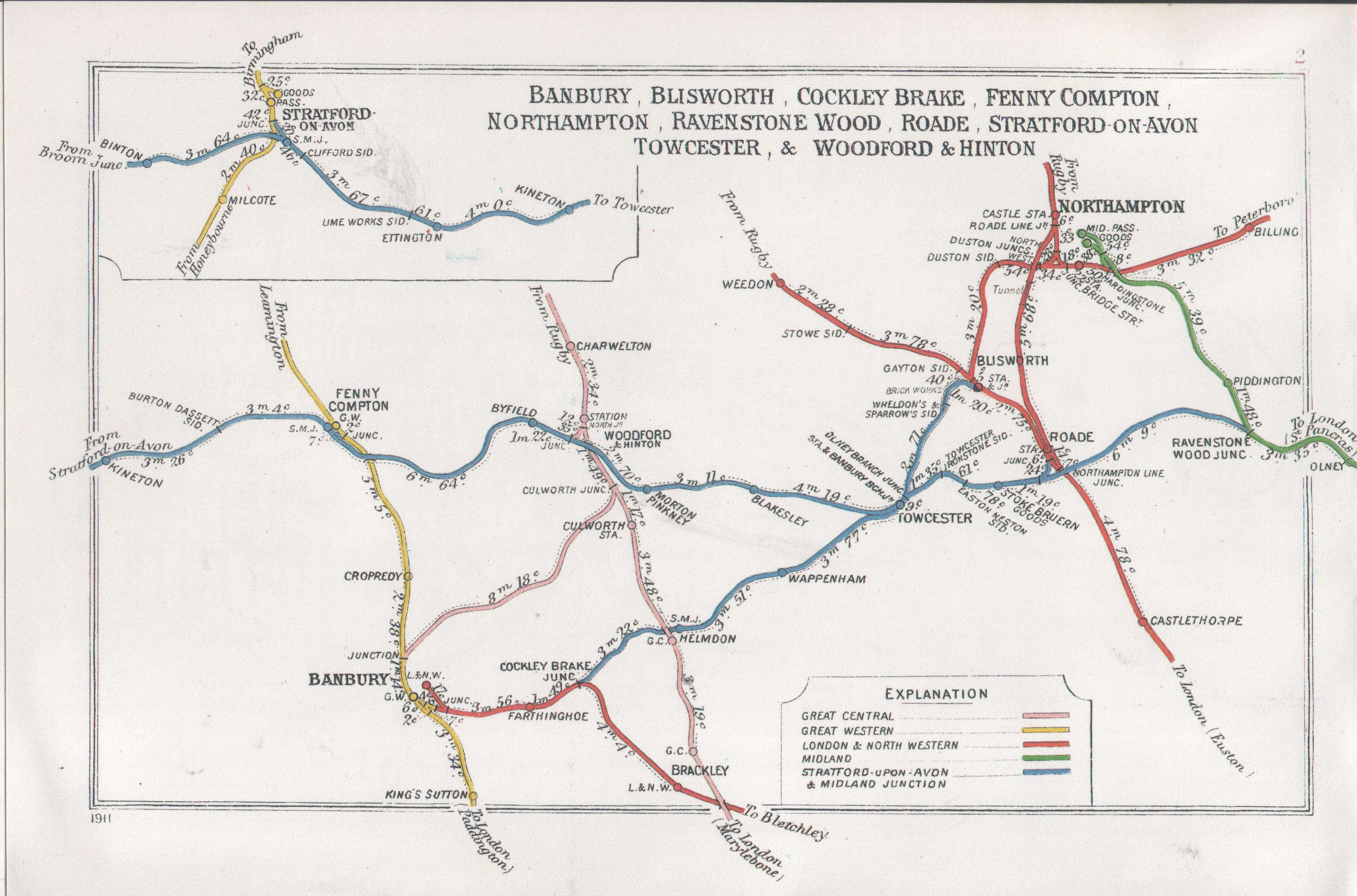
A 1911 Railway Clearing House map of railways in the vicinity of Billing (upper right, in red)

The service was from Peterborough to Northampton via Wellingborough. The station opened in 1845 and closed in 1952 to passengers.

Former Services

Preceding station	Disused railways	Following station
Northampton Bridge Street	London and North Western Railway; Northampton and Peterborough Railway	Castle Ashby & Earls Barton
