= Bellshill railway station (North British Railway) =

Disused railway station in Bellshill, North Lanarkshire

Coordinates: 55.8200°N 4.0307°W

Bellshill

General information
- Location: Bellshill, North Lanarkshire; Scotland
- Platforms: 2

Other information
- Status: Disused

History
- Original company: North British Railway
- Pre-grouping: North British Railway
- Post-grouping: London, Midland and Scottish Railway

Key dates
- 1 May 1879: Opened
- 1 January 1917: Closed to passengers temporarily
- 2 June 1919: Reopened to passengers
- 10 September 1951: Closed
Location

Bellshill railway station served the town of Bellshill, North Lanarkshire, Scotland, from 1879 to 1951 on the Glasgow, Bothwell, Hamilton and Coatbridge Railway.

== History ==
The station was opened on 1 May 1879 by the North British Railway. It closed on 1 January 1917 but reopened on 2 June 1919, before closing permanently on 10 September 1951.

Preceding station	Disused railways	Following station
Terminus	North British Railway; Glasgow, Bothwell, Hamilton and Coatbridge Railway	Bothwell Park; Line and station closed
