= Bankhead railway station (Aberdeen) =

Disused railway station in Bankhead, Aberdeenshire

Bankhead
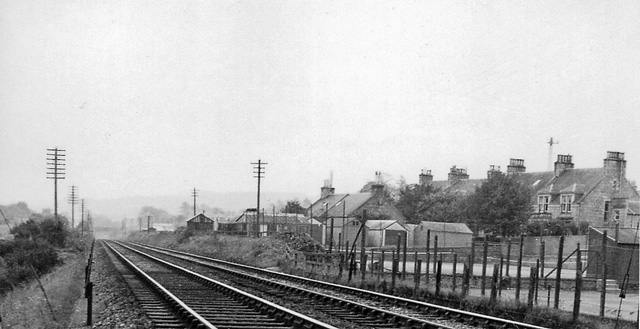
- The site of the station in 1961

General information
- Location: Bankhead, Aberdeenshire; Scotland
- Coordinates: 57.1836°N 2.1777°W
- Grid reference: NJ893103
- Platforms: 2

Other information
- Status: Disused

History
- Original company: Great North of Scotland Railway
- Pre-grouping: Great North of Scotland Railway
- Post-grouping: LNER

Key dates
- 1 July 1887: Opened
- 5 April 1937: Closed
Location

Bankhead railway station (Aberdeen) served the area of Bankhead, Aberdeenshire, Scotland from 1887 to 1937 on the Great North of Scotland Railway.

== History ==
The station opened on 1 July 1887 by the Great North of Scotland Railway. It closed to both passengers and goods traffic on 5 April 1937.

Preceding station	Historical railways	Following station
Bucksburn; Line open, station closed	Great North of Scotland Railway	Stoneywood; Line open, station closed
