= Bisley Camp railway station =

Disused railway station in Bisley, Surrey

Bisley Camp
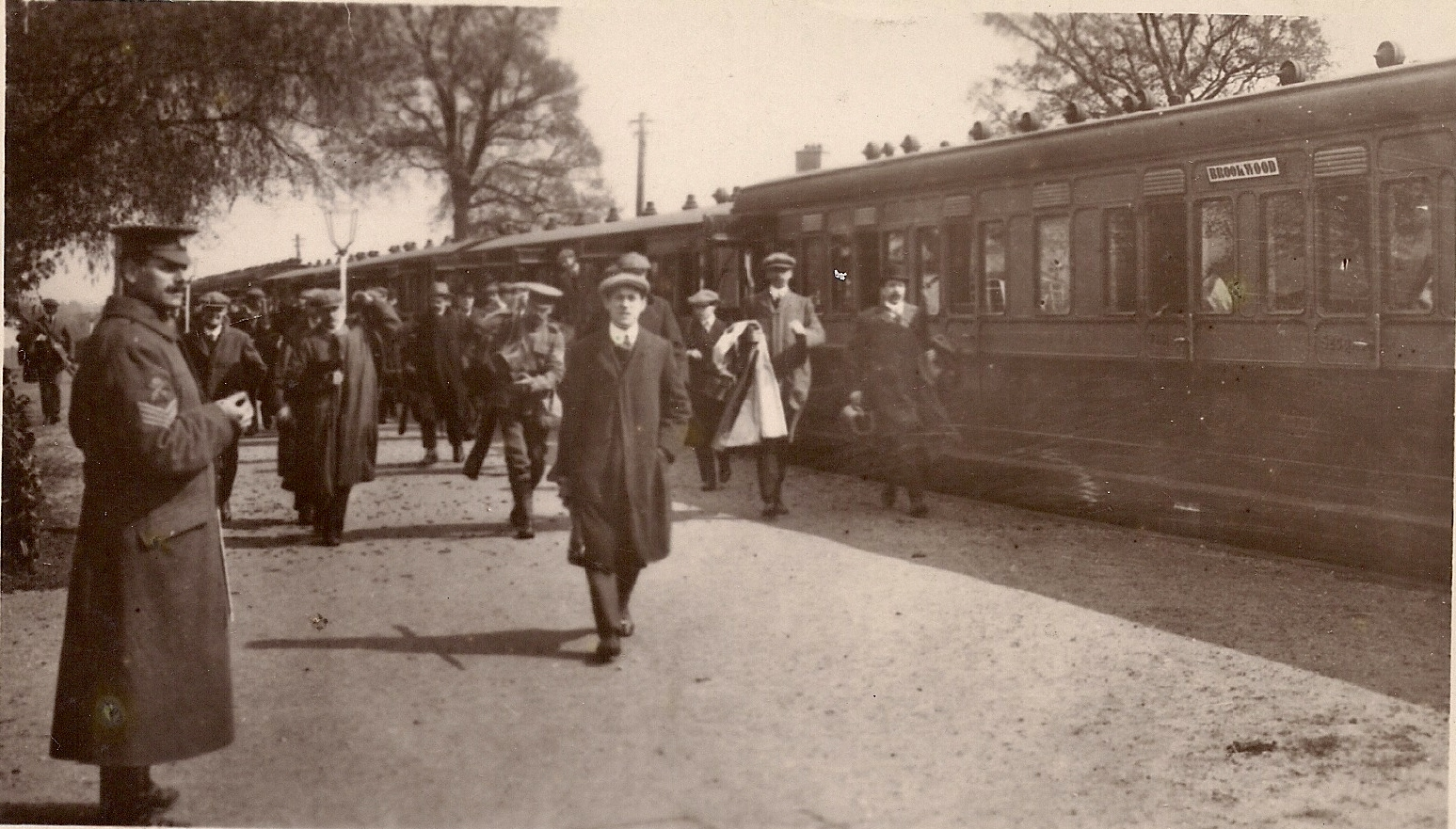
- The station in 1927

General information
- Location: Bisley, Surrey; England
- Coordinates: 51.3107°N 0.6585°W
- Grid reference: SU936577
- Platforms: 1

Other information
- Status: Disused

History
- Original company: London and South Western Railway
- Pre-grouping: London and South Western Railway
- Post-grouping: Southern Railway; British Railways (Southern Region)

Key dates
- 14 July 1890: Opened
- 19 July 1952: Closed
Location

Bisley Camp railway station served the National Rifle Association in Bisley, Surrey, England, from 1890 to 1952 on Bisley Camp branch line.

== History ==
The station was opened on 14 July 1890 by the London and South Western Railway, although the first train stopped here on 12 July. It served the National Rifle Association facility when there was an annual meeting. It was relocated in 1891. There were no meetings from 1915 to 1918 so services were suspended. The War Office took over the station during the First World War and trained the troops at the nearby facility. After the war ended, it was returned to London and South Western Railway. Nearby were sidings and loops, which trains used to reverse out, and a level crossing. The station was still shown on the British Railways pamphlets in 1948. The last train was on 19 July 1952, although it was still used irregularly for military excursions.
