= Baglan Sands Halt railway station =

Disused railway station in Baglan, Neath Port Talbot

Coordinates: 51.6174°N 3.8186°W

Baglan Sands

General information
- Location: Baglan, Neath Port Talbot; Wales
- Grid reference: SS741925
- Platforms: 1

Other information
- Status: Disused

History
- Original company: Great Western Railway
- Post-grouping: Great Western Railway

Key dates
- 1 May 1933: Station opens
- 26 September 1938: Station closes
- 29 May 1939: Station reopens
- 25 September 1939: Station closes
Location

Baglan Sands Halt railway station was a railway station on the Rhondda and Swansea Bay line which ran from the Rhondda Valley to Swansea on the Welsh coast in the county of Glamorgan.

== History ==
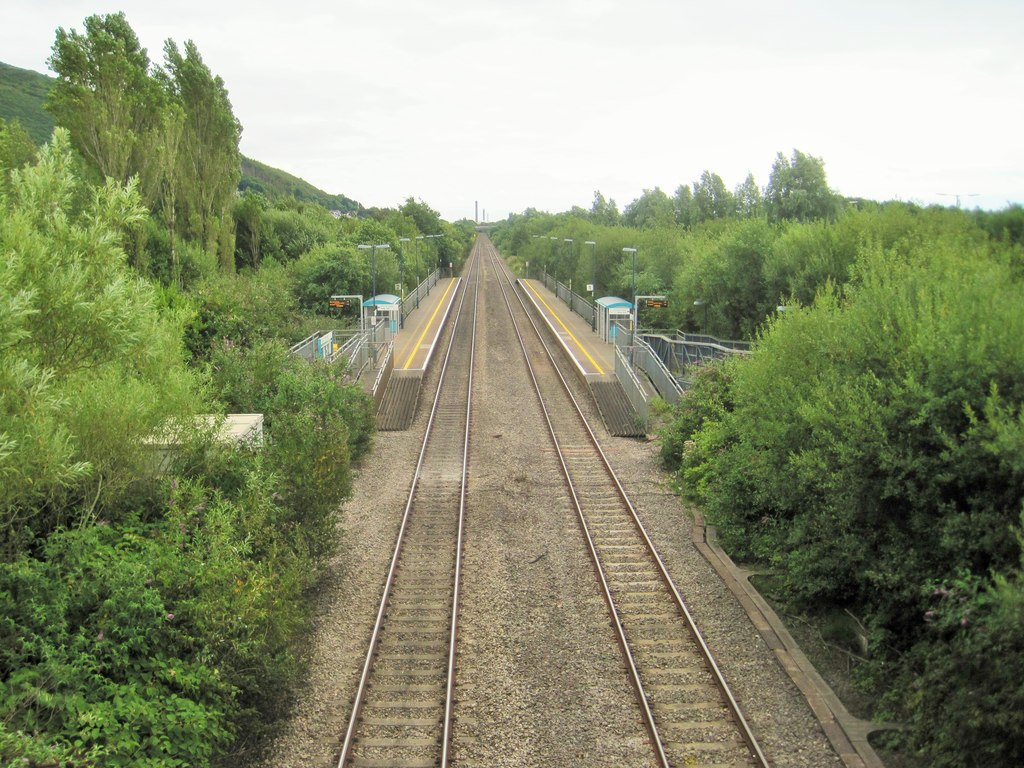
The 1996 Baglan railway station

The station was opened in 1933 by the Great Western Railway. A number of rifle ranges were located in the Baglan Burrow area facing towards Witford Point, established since WWI and then greatly expanded with an access road from near Baglan School. The range is recorded from 1898.

Baglan Sands Halt opened in 1933 and closed in 1938, only to reopen briefly between May and September 1939. The OS map published in 1964 shows the halt and indicates that it was disused. and only a single rifle range is shown. A 'Baglan Rifle Range Association' is recorded in the National Archives.

The halt was 16m 30c from the Rhondda & Swansea Bay Junction. The site is now occupied by a factory and the Rhondda and Swansea Bay line has been closed since 1962.

A Baglan railway station was opened in 1996 on the old Great Western Railway's South Wales Main Line.

== Notes ==
| Preceding station | Disused railways | Following station |
|---|---|---|
| Aberavon Town | Great Western Railway; Rhondda and Swansea Bay Railway | Briton Ferry East |
