= Brookhay railway station =

Short-lived railway station in Brookhay, Staffordshire

Coordinates: 52.703551°N 1.764085°W

Brookhay

General information
- Location: Brookhay, Staffordshire; England
- Platforms: 2

Other information
- Status: Disused

History
- Original company: South Staffordshire Railway

Key dates
- June 1849: Opened
- December 1849: Closed

Brookhay railway station served the settlement of Brookhay, Staffordshire, England in 1849 on the Dudley to Lichfield line.

== History ==
The station was opened in June 1849 by the South Staffordshire Railway. It was a very short-lived station, disappearing from Bradshaw six months later in December 1849.

Preceding station	Disused railways	Following station
Lichfield Trent Valley; Line closed, station open	South Staffordshire Railway; Dudley to Lichfield line	Alrewas; Line and station closed
