= Briton Ferry West railway station =

Disused railway station in Briton Ferry, Neath Port Talbot

Briton Ferry West
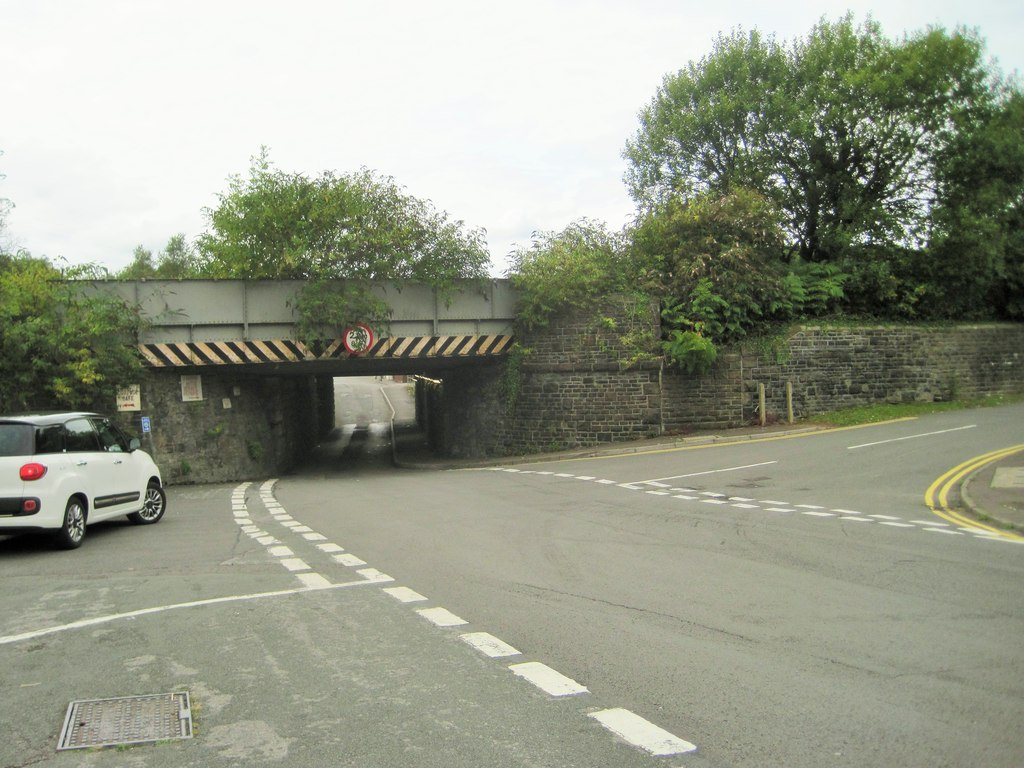
- The site of the station in 2014

General information
- Location: Briton Ferry, Glamorganshire; Wales
- Coordinates: 51.6313°N 3.8222°W
- Grid reference: SS739940
- Platforms: 2

Other information
- Status: Disused

History
- Original company: South Wales Railway
- Pre-grouping: Great Western Railway
- Post-grouping: Great Western Railway

Key dates
- 2 September 1850: Opened as Briton Ferry
- 1 July 1924: Name changed to Briton Ferry West
- 8 July 1935: Closed
Location

Briton Ferry West railway station served the town of Briton Ferry, in the historical county of Glamorganshire, Wales, from 1895 to 1935 on the South Wales Railway.

== History ==
The station was opened as Briton Ferry on 2 September 1850 by the South Wales Railway. Its name was changed to Briton Ferry West on 1 July 1924 to distinguish it from Briton Ferry East. It closed on 8 July 1935, being replaced by the newer Briton Ferry station to the north.

| Preceding station | Disused railways | Following station |
|---|---|---|
| Baglan; Line and station open | South Wales Railway | Neath; Line and station open |
