= Berwig Halt railway station =

Former railway station in Minera, Wales

Berwig Halt
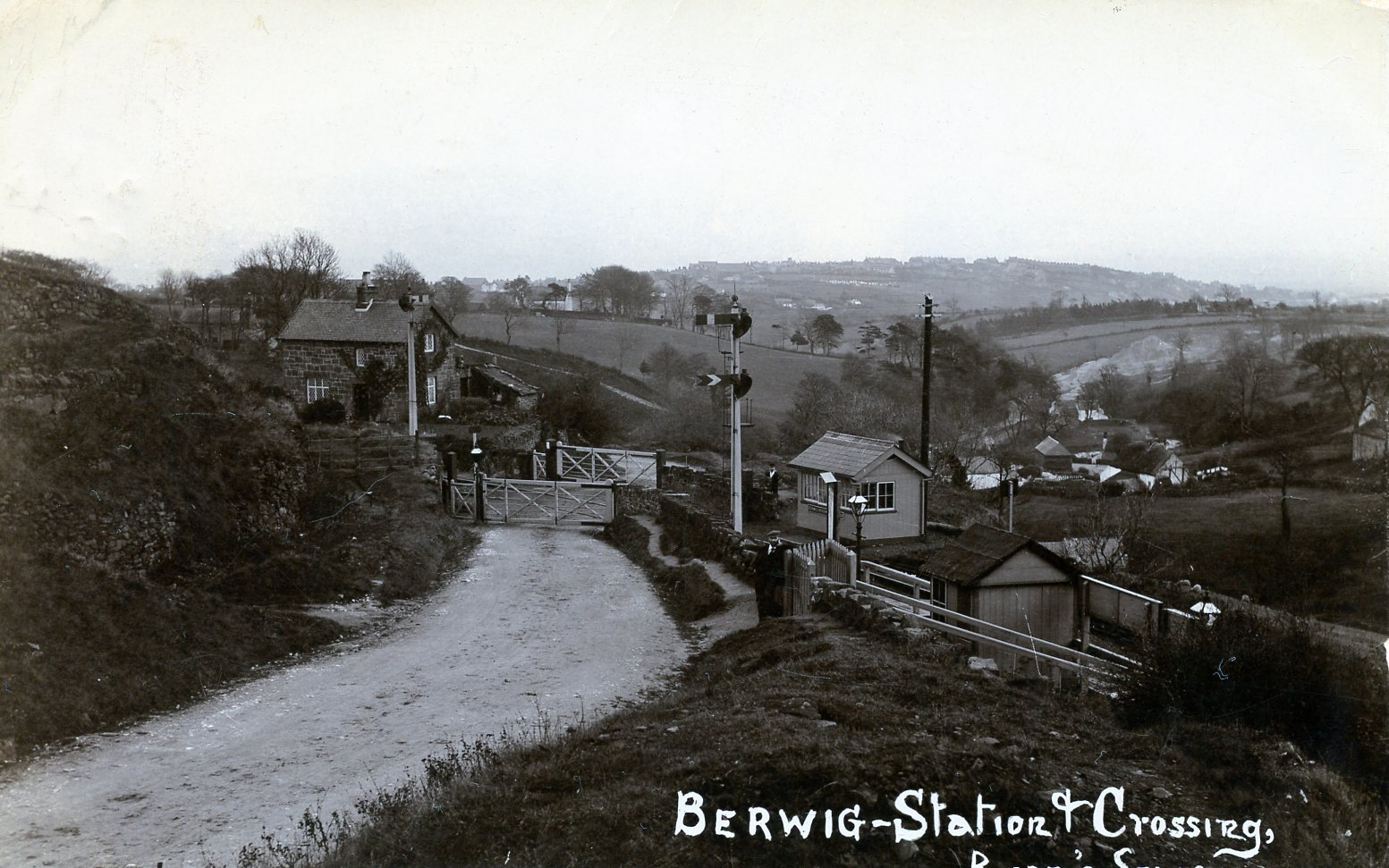
- Berwig Halt Railway Station, 1908

General information
- Location: Minera, Wrexham County Borough; Wales
- Coordinates: 53.0596°N 3.0973°W
- Grid reference: SJ266519
- Platforms: 1

Other information
- Status: Disused

History
- Original company: Great Western Railway
- Pre-grouping: Great Western Railway
- Post-grouping: Great Western Railway

Key dates
- 1 May 1905: Opened
- 1 January 1917: Closed
- 2 April 1917: Reopened
- 1 January 1931: Closed
Location

Berwig Halt railway station was a station in Minera, Wrexham, Wales. The station was opened on 1 May 1905 and closed on 1 January 1931.

The location of the station was immediately south of the former level crossing on the unclassified Church Road, about 150 yard south-west of its junction with Cae Glas Lane.

Preceding station	Disused railways	Following station
Terminus	Great Western Railway; Wrexham and Minera Railway	Vicarage Crossing Halt; Line and station closed
