= British Rhondda Halt railway station =

Short-lived railway station in Pont Walby, Neath Port Talbot

British Rhondda Halt

General information
- Location: Pont Walby, Glamorganshire; Wales
- Coordinates: 51.7462°N 3.6096°W
- Grid reference: SN889065
- Platforms: 1

Other information
- Status: Disused

History
- Original company: Great Western Railway
- Pre-grouping: Great Western Railway

Key dates
- 27 August 1906: Opened
- 1 May 1911: Closed
Location

British Rhondda Halt railway station served the area of Pont Walby, in the historical county of Glamorganshire, Wales, from 1906 to 1911 on the Vale of Neath Railway.

== History ==
The station was opened on 27 August 1906 by the Great Western Railway. It was a short-lived station, only being open for four and a half years before being replaced by Pontwalby Halt on 1 May 1911.

Preceding station	Disused railways	Following station
Hirwaun; Line and station closed	Great Western Railway; Vale of Neath Railway	Glyn Neath; Line and station closed
