= Betley Road railway station =

Disused railway station in Staffordshire, England

Coordinates: 53.0274°N 2.3864°W

Betley Road
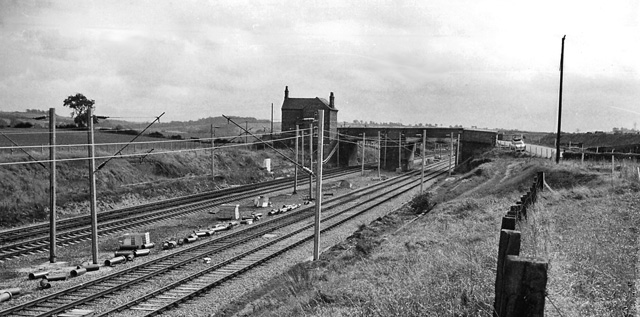
- Site of the former station (1961)

General information
- Location: Blakenhall, Cheshire; England
- Grid reference: SJ741478
- Platforms: 4

Other information
- Status: Disused

History
- Original company: London and North Western Railway
- Pre-grouping: London and North Western Railway
- Post-grouping: London, Midland and Scottish Railway

Key dates
- 1 Jul 1875: Opened
- 1 Oct 1945: Closed
Location

Betley Road was a station on the London and North Western Railway serving Betley, Staffordshire.

It opened in 1875 and closed in 1945.

Preceding station	Historical railways	Following station
Basford; Line open, station closed	London and North Western Railway; London and North Western Railway	Madeley (Staffordshire); Line open, station closed
