= Bramshot Halt railway station =

Disused railway station in Bramshott, East Hampshire

Bramshot Halt

General information
- Location: Fleet, Hart District; England
- Coordinates: 51.2917°N 0.8139°W
- Grid reference: SU828554
- Platforms: 2

Other information
- Status: Disused

History
- Original company: London and South Western Railway
- Post-grouping: Southern Railway

Key dates
- 10 May 1913: Opened
- 6 May 1946: Closed
Location

Bramshot Halt railway station served the adjacent Bramshot Golf Course from 1913 to 1946 on the London and Southampton Railway and was located between Fleet and Farnborough in Hampshire.

== History ==
The station was opened on 10 May 1913 by the London and South Western Railway. It served the members of the adjacent golf club of the same name. On 4 November 1926, a milk goods train and an express passenger train collided 530 yards east of the halt. It was spelt as Bramshott Halt on tickets and Bramshot Halt on timetables, as well as in the railway handbook of 1936. Until 3 July 1938, only members were allowed to access the station. It first appeared in Bradshaw's Guide in October 1938, although it was only used by workmen of the nearby Southwood Camp. It closed on 6 May 1946 after three workers were killed and one seriously injured by a train after attempting to cross the tracks.

Preceding station	Disused railways	Following station
Farnborough (Main); Line and station open	London and South Western Railway; London and Southampton Railway	Fleet; Line and station open
