= Ballathie railway station =

Disused railway station in Ballathie, Perth and Kinross

Ballathie

General information
- Location: Ballathie, Perth and Kinross; Scotland
- Coordinates: 56.5133°N 3.408°W
- Grid reference: NO134364
- Platforms: 2

Other information
- Status: Disused

History
- Original company: Scottish Midland Junction Railway
- Pre-grouping: Caledonian Railway

Key dates
- 2 August 1848: Opened
- July 1868: Closed
Location

Ballathie railway station served the hamlet of Ballathie, Perth and Kinross, Scotland from 1848 to 1868 on the Scottish Midland Junction Railway.

== History ==
The station opened on 2 August 1848 by the Scottish Midland Junction Railway. To the north was a siding, which was known as Innernytie siding, and to the west of this was a signal box. The station disappeared from Bradshaw in October 1849 but reappeared in February 1850. It closed fully in July 1868.

| Preceding station | Disused railways | Following station |
|---|---|---|
| Cargill; Line and station closed | Scottish Midland Junction Railway | Stanley Junction; Line and station closed |
