= Brymbo West Crossing Halt railway station =

Disused railway station in Wales

Brymbo West Crossing Halt
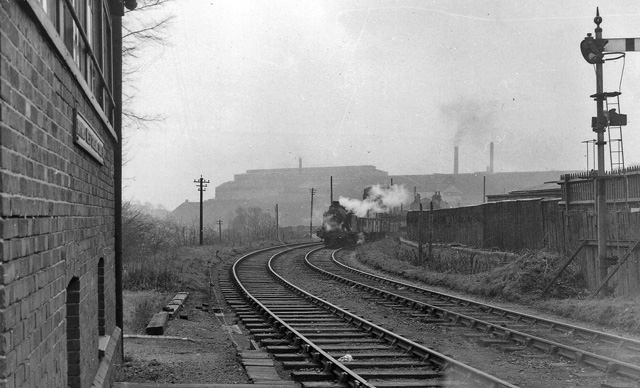
- A freight train approaching Brymbo West Crossing Halt in 1962

General information
- Location: Brymbo, Wrexham; Wales
- Coordinates: 53.0787°N 3.0527°W
- Grid reference: SJ295540
- Platforms: 2

Other information
- Status: Disused

History
- Original company: Great Western Railway
- Pre-grouping: Great Western Railway
- Post-grouping: Great Western Railway

Key dates
- 20 March 1905: Opened
- 1 January 1931: Closed
Location

Brymbo West Crossing Halt railway station was a station in Brymbo, Wrexham, Wales. The station was opened on 20 March 1905 and closed on 1 January 1931.

Preceding station	Disused railways	Following station
Pentresaeson Halt; Line and station closed	Great Western Railway; Wrexham and Minera Railway	Brymbo (WMR); Line and station closed
