= Briery =

Village in Cumbria, England

Coordinates: 54.60°N 03.11°W

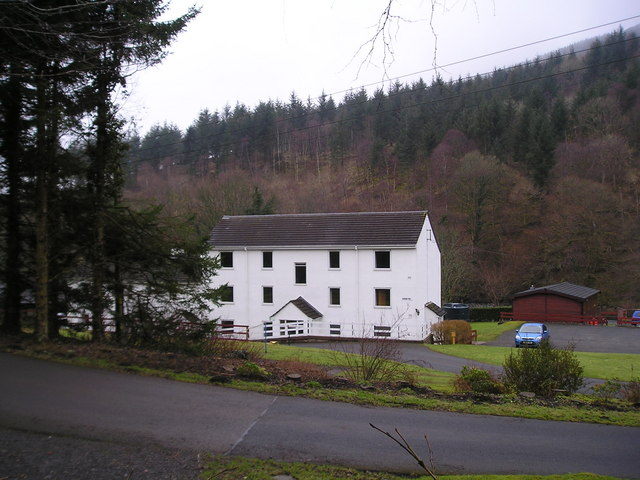
- Former bobbin mill, Low Briery

- Location in Allerdale, Cumbria Location within Cumbria
- OS grid reference: NY2824
- Civil parish: Keswick
- Unitary authority: Cumberland
- Ceremonial county: Cumbria
- Region: North West
- Country: England
- Sovereign state: United Kingdom
- Post town: KESWICK
- Postcode district: CA12
- Dialling code: 01768
- Police: Cumbria
- Fire: Cumbria
- Ambulance: North West
- UK Parliament: Penrith and Solway

Briery is a village in Cumbria, England.
