= Barton and Walton railway station =

Former railway station in Staffordshire, England

Barton and Walton
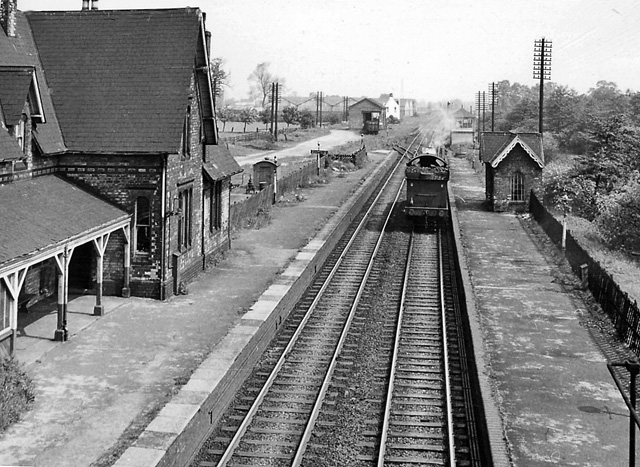
- Barton and Walton in 1962

General information
- Location: Barton-under-Needwood, East Staffordshire; England
- Coordinates: 52.7616°N 1.6967°W
- Grid reference: SK205182
- Platforms: 2

Other information
- Status: Disused

History
- Original company: Birmingham and Derby Junction Railway
- Pre-grouping: Midland Railway
- Post-grouping: London, Midland and Scottish Railway

Key dates
- 12 August 1839: Opened
- 5 August 1958: Closed
Location

Barton and Walton railway station opened in 1839 by the Birmingham and Derby Junction Railway on its original route from Derby to Hampton-in-Arden meeting the London and Birmingham Railway for London.

The village of Walton-upon-Trent itself is in Derbyshire, but the station was in Staffordshire.

== History ==
Pixton suggests that it was initially called Walton, but Butt does not have any record. Originally it may have simply been a halt, but under the Midland Railway it acquired substantial brick buildings. The Midland would have had to rename it when it opened Walton in 1846 on the Syston and Peterborough line. The station closed in 1958, although an unadvertised train stopped on 11 September 1961.

== Route ==
Preceding station	Disused railways	Following station
Wichnor Junction; Line open, station closed	Midland Railway; Derby to Birmingham route	Branston; Line open, station closed
