= Birchills railway station =

Disused railway station in Birchills, West Midlands

Birchills
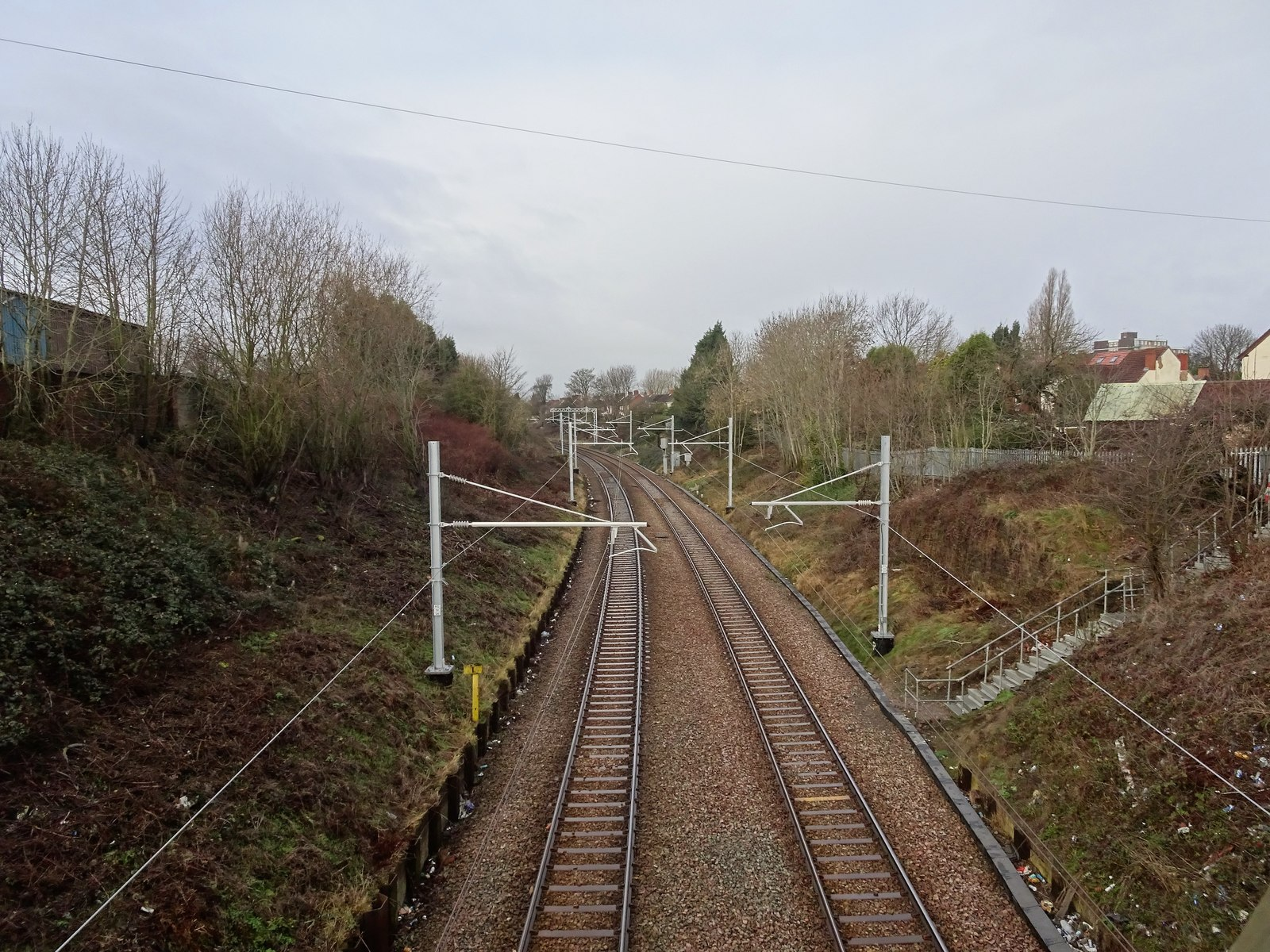
- The site of the station, looking northwest towards Bloxwich, in 2019

General information
- Location: Birchills, West Midlands; England
- Coordinates: 52.6038°N 1.992°W
- Grid reference: SK006006
- Platforms: 2

Other information
- Status: Disused

History
- Original company: South Staffordshire Railway
- Pre-grouping: London and North Western Railway

Key dates
- February 1858: First opened (limited service)
- 1 June 1858: Fully opened
- 1 January 1916: Closed
Location

Birchills railway station served the village of Birchills, West Midlands, England, from 1858 to 1916 on the Chase Line.

== History ==
The station first appeared in Bradshaw in February 1858, but on Saturday market days only. It opened fully on 1 June 1858. It was known as Birchills Halt in some 1909 timetables. It closed on 1 January 1916. Nothing remains.

Preceding station	Historical railways	Following station
Bloxwich; Line and station open	Chase Line; South Staffordshire Railway	Walsall; Line and station open
