= Barrow for Tarvin railway station =

Former railway station in Barrow, Cheshire, England

Barrow for Tarvin
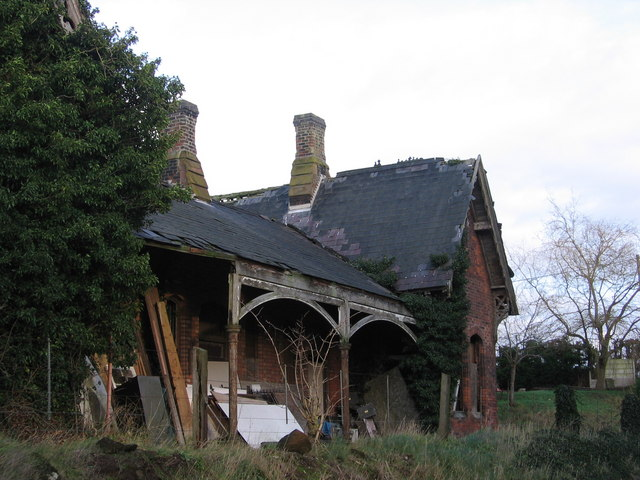
- Former station building

General information
- Location: Barrow, Cheshire West and Chester; England
- Coordinates: 53.2259°N 2.7976°W
- Grid reference: SJ467702
- Platforms: 2

Other information
- Status: Disused

History
- Original company: Cheshire Lines Committee
- Pre-grouping: Cheshire Lines Committee
- Post-grouping: Cheshire Lines Committee

Key dates
- 1 May 1875: Opened
- 1 June 1953: Closed
Location

Barrow for Tarvin railway station was in Barrow, Cheshire, England. The station was opened by the Cheshire Lines Committee on 1 May 1875 as Tarvin & Barrow, but renamed in 1883 to better reflect its location (the village of Tarvin being more than 2 miles (3.2 km) away). A goods shed and sidings were provided to the west of the passenger depot, which was provided with standard CLC main buildings on the Manchester-bound side and a brick shelter on the Chester-bound platform. The sidings were worked from a signal box on the up (northbound) platform.

By 1895, seven southbound (Down) and six northbound (up) trains called here each weekday, with one additional call each way on a Saturday and three each way on Sundays. This service pattern remained broadly unchanged after the 1923 Grouping, but had improved to nine up and eleven down trains by 1949.

However, it was subsequently closed by the British Transport Commission on 1 June 1953, due to low usage. Goods traffic ceased at the same time, with the signal box being closed the following year and the remaining facilities removed by 1958. The line through the station site was subsequently reduced to single track in September 1969, prior to the closure of the former CLC Chester Northgate terminus and the diversion of traffic to Chester (General) the following month.

The station building here still survives (though derelict) and is visible from passing trains, having been sold for use as private residence.

Preceding station	Disused railways	Following station
Mickle Trafford East; Line open, station closed	Cheshire Lines Committee; Mid-Cheshire line	Mouldsworth; Line and station open
