= Bridgend railway station (L&OG) =

Short-lived railway station in Bridgend, Bridgend County Borough

Coordinates: 51.5088°N 3.5778°W

Bridgend

General information
- Location: Bridgend, Glamorganshire; Wales
- Platforms: 1

Other information
- Status: Disused

History
- Original company: Llynvi and Ogmore Railway
- Pre-grouping: Llynvi and Ogmore Railway

Key dates
- 25 February 1864: Opened
- 1 July 1873: Closed

Bridgend railway station served the town of Bridgend, in the historical county of Glamorganshire, Wales, from 1864 to 1873 on the Bridgend Branch.

== History ==
The station was opened on 25 February 1864 by the Llynvi and Ogmore Railway. It was a short-lived terminus, only being open for nine years before it closed on 1 July 1873. The services were diverted to the current Bridgend station.

| Preceding station | Disused railways | Following station |
|---|---|---|
| Tondu; Line closed, station open | Llynvi and Ogmore Railway; Bridgend Branch | Terminus |
