= Bucksburn railway station =

Disused railway station in Bucksburn, Aberdeenshire

Bucksburn
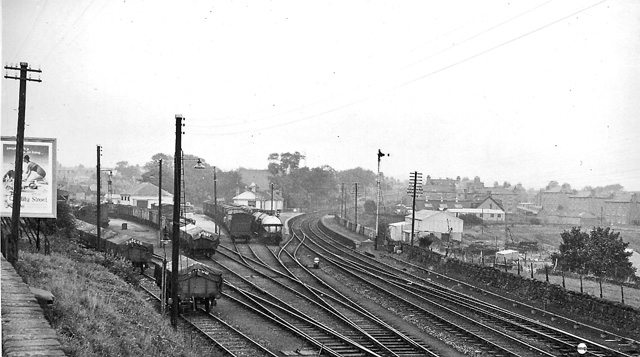
- The station in 1961

General information
- Location: Bucksburn, Aberdeenshire; Scotland
- Coordinates: 57.1782°N 2.1692°W
- Grid reference: NJ898097
- Platforms: 2

Other information
- Status: Disused

History
- Original company: Great North of Scotland Railway
- Pre-grouping: Great North of Scotland Railway
- Post-grouping: London and North Eastern Railway

Key dates
- 20 September 1854: Opened as Buxburn
- 1 January 1897: Name changed to Bucksburn
- 5 March 1956: Closed to passengers
- 22 April 1968: Closed to goods
Location

Bucksburn railway station served the suburb of Bucksburn, Aberdeenshire, Scotland from 1854 to 1968 on the Great North of Scotland Railway.

== History ==
The station opened as Buxburn on 20 September 1854 by the Great North of Scotland Railway. The name changed to Bucksburn on 1 January 1897. The station closed to passengers on 5 March 1956 and closed to goods on 22 April 1968.

Preceding station	Historical railways	Following station
Persley; Line open, station closed	Great North of Scotland Railway	Bankhead; Line open, station closed
