= Madeley railway station (Staffordshire) =

Disused railway station in Staffordshire, England

Madeley
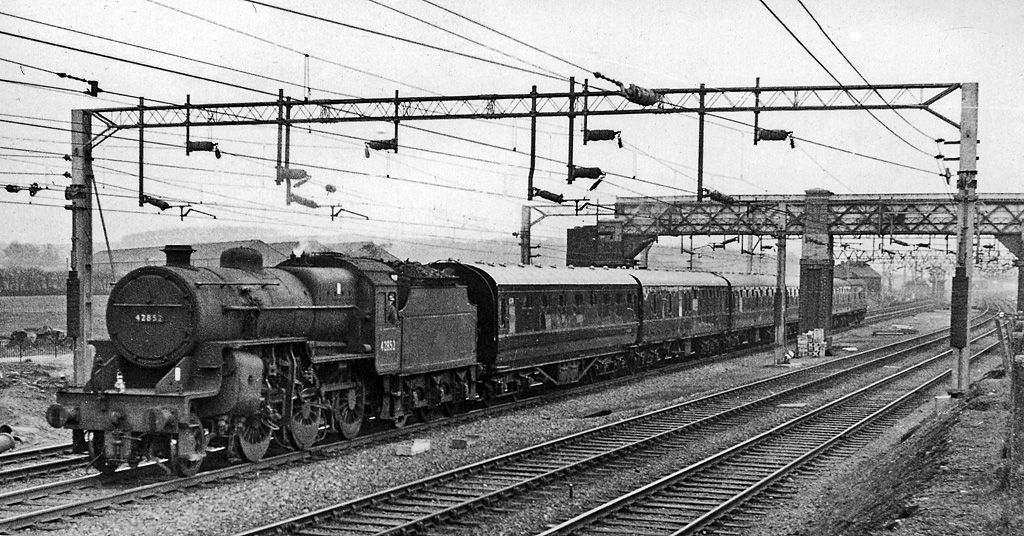
- A train passing the site of the station in 1962

General information
- Location: Madeley, Newcastle-under-Lyme, Staffordshire; England
- Coordinates: 52.9915°N 2.3389°W
- Grid reference: SJ773438
- Platforms: 4

Other information
- Status: Disused

History
- Original company: Grand Junction Railway
- Pre-grouping: London and North Western Railway
- Post-grouping: London, Midland and Scottish Railway

Key dates
- 4 July 1837: Opened
- 4 February 1952: Closed
Location

Madeley railway station is a disused railway station in Staffordshire, England.

The station was opened by the Grand Junction Railway in 1837. It closed in 1952.

Preceding station	Historical railways	Following station
Whitmore; Line open, station closed	London and North Western Railway; Grand Junction Railway	Betley Road; Line open, station closed
