= Brynmill railway station =

Disused railway station in Brynmill, Swansea

Brynmill

General information
- Location: Brynmill, Glamorgan; Wales
- Coordinates: 51.6095°N 3.9727°W
- Grid reference: SS634919

Other information
- Status: Disused

History
- Original company: Oystermouth Railway
- Pre-grouping: Swansea and Mumbles Railway; Swansea Improvements and Tramway Company
- Post-grouping: Swansea Improvements and Tramway Company

Key dates
- 25 March 1807: Opened
- 1827: Closed
- 25 July 1860: Reopened
- 6 January 1960: Closed
Location

Brynmill railway station served the suburb of Brynmill, in the historical county of Glamorgan, Wales, from 1807 to 1960 on the Swansea and Mumbles Railway.

== History ==
The station was opened on 25 March 1807 by the Oystermouth Railway. Like the rest of the stations on the line, the first services were horse-drawn. It closed in 1827 but it reopened on 25 July 1860. It was known as Water Works or Waterworks Halt in most publications but it was later changed to Bryn Mill Road in the 1878 edition of Dickson. It was also known as Brynmill Road in the 1885 and 1886 editions of the Cambrian timetable and Brynmill in the 1893 and 1894 editions of Bradshaw. In later years until its closure it was situated opposite the Oystermouth road end of Brynmill Terrace. The station closed along with the line on 6 January 1960, with the original structure remaining in place until mid 1970s.

Preceding station	Disused railways	Following station
St Helens; Line and station closed	Swansea and Mumbles Railway	Ashleigh Road; Line and station closed
