= Bowhouse railway station =

Disused railway station in Bowhouse, Falkirk

Bowhouse
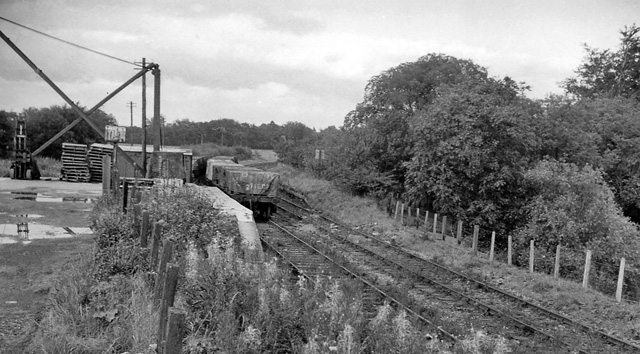
- The goods only station in 1962

General information
- Location: Bowhouse, Falkirk; Scotland
- Coordinates: 55.9574°N 3.6889°W
- Grid reference: NS945751
- Platforms: 1

Other information
- Status: Disused

History
- Original company: Slamannan Railway
- Pre-grouping: Monkland Railways; North British Railway
- Post-grouping: London and North Eastern Railway

Key dates
- 1840s: Opened
- 1 May 1930: Closed to passengers
- 6 July 1964: Closed to goods
Location

Bowhouse railway station served the suburb of Bowhouse, Falkirk, Scotland, from the 1840s to 1964 on the Slamannan Railway.

== History ==
The station was opened in the 1840s by the Slamannan Railway. It has three sidings a loading bank and a goods yard with a goods shed, although it wasn't served by rail. The signal box opened in 1892 but it was downgraded to a ground frame in 1892. The station closed to passengers on 1 May 1930 and closed to goods on 6 July 1964.

Preceding station	Disused railways	Following station
Causewayend; Line and station closed	Slamannan Railway	Blackston Junction; Line and station closed
