= Briton Ferry East railway station =

Disused railway station in Briton Ferry, Neath Port Talbot

Briton Ferry East

General information
- Location: Briton Ferry, Glamorganshire; Wales
- Coordinates: 51.631535°N 3.822041°W
- Platforms: 2

Other information
- Status: Disused

History
- Original company: Rhondda and Swansea Bay Railway
- Pre-grouping: Great Western Railway
- Post-grouping: Great Western Railway

Key dates
- 14 March 1895: Opened as Briton Ferry
- 1 July 1924: Name changed to Briton Ferry East
- 16 September 1935: Closed
Location

Briton Ferry East railway station served the town of Briton Ferry, in the historical county of Glamorganshire, Wales, from 1895 to 1935 on the Rhondda and Swansea Bay Railway.

== History ==
The station was opened as Briton Ferry on 14 March 1895 by the Rhondda and Swansea Bay Railway. Its name was changed to Briton Ferry East on 1 July 1924 to distinguish it from Briton Ferry West. It closed on 16 September 1935 when it was replaced by the newer Briton Ferry station.

Preceding station	Disused railways	Following station
Baglan Sands Halt; Line and station closed	Rhondda and Swansea Bay Railway	Court Sart; Line and station closed
