= Durham Coast =

Protected area in County Durham, England

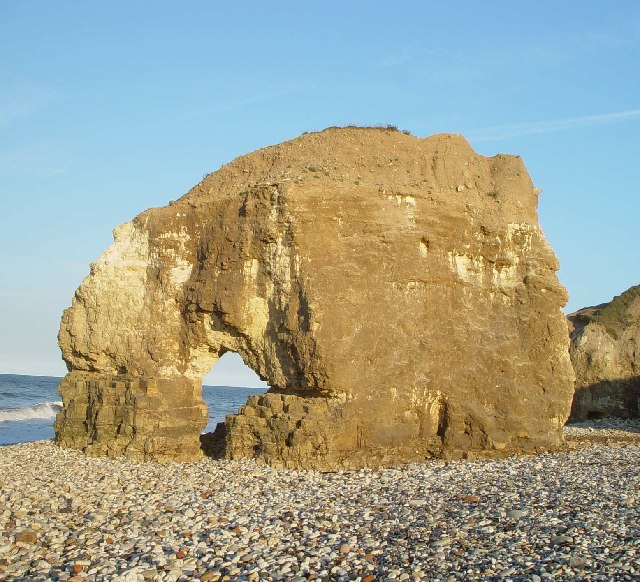
- Blackhall Rocks on the Durham coast
- Interactive map of Durham Coast
- Location: MAGiC MaP
- Nearest city: Sunderland
- Area: 765.41 ha (1,891.4 acres)
- Established: 1960
- Governing body: Natural England
- Website: Durham Coast SSSI

The Durham Coast is a Site of Special Scientific Interest in County Durham, England. Starting just North of the River Tees estuary it extends, with a few interruptions, northward to the mouth of the River Tyne at South Shields. Notable locations on the Durham Coast include Hartlepool Headland, Seaham, Sunderland Docks and Whitburn Beach.

The area included in the SSSI includes six Geological Conservation Review sites, including Marsden Bay, a classic study area for coastal geomorphology since the 1950s.

The geology of the area is characterised by the exposure on the cliffs and beaches of the dolomite and limestone formed in the late Permian period. The sea cliffs between Trow Pint and Whitburn Bay provide evidence of the changes in sea levels that have occurred in the intervening period.

The SSSI is important both for its flora and fauna. It includes most of the paramaritime Magnesian Limestone vegetation found in Britain, a vegetation type that is unique to the Durham coast and that differs markedly from the grassland developed on similar strata elsewhere in lowland Durham. The different habitats have varying flora; the open heathland supports red fescue, sea plantain and thrift. In more sheltered places, the calcareous grasslands, support a biodiverse range of flowering plants including pyramidal orchid and such specialities as marsh helleborine, grass-of-Parnassus, round-leaved wintergreen and bird’s-eye primrose. Another habitat is the dune system and golf course which supports a different assemblage of plants. In some of the dune slacks there are populations of marsh orchid and common twayblade.

The Durham coast also supports a variety of birds, including nationally important populations of sanderling, wintering purple sandpiper and breeding little tern. There is also a rich variety of invertebrates, including colonies of the Durham Argus butterfly, Aricia artaxerxes salmacis, and the least minor moth, Photedes captiuncula.
