= A19 road =

Road in northern England

A19

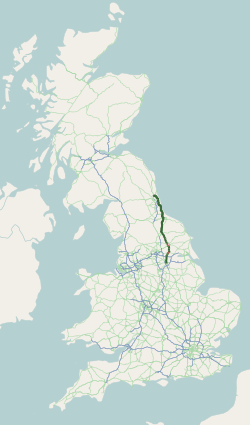

Route information
- Length: 124 mi (200 km)

Major junctions
- North end: Seaton Burn; 55.0645°N 1.6373°W
- A1; A66; A59; A64; A63 M62
- South end: Doncaster; 53.5272°N 1.1337°W

Location
- Country: United Kingdom
- Constituent country: England
- Primary destinations: York; Thirsk; Teesside; Hartlepool; Sunderland; Tyne Tunnel

Road network
- Roads in the United Kingdom; Motorways; A and B road zones
← A18	→ A20

The A19 is a major road in England running approximately parallel to and east of the A1 road. Although the two roads meet at the northern end of the A19, the two roads originally met at the southern end of the A19 in Doncaster, but the old route of the A1 was changed to the A638. From Sunderland northwards, the route was formerly the A1018. In the past the route was known as the East of Snaith-York-Thirsk-Stockton-on-Tees-Sunderland Trunk Road. Most traffic joins the A19, heading for Teesside, from the A168 at Dishforth Interchange.

== Route ==
=== Doncaster–Selby ===
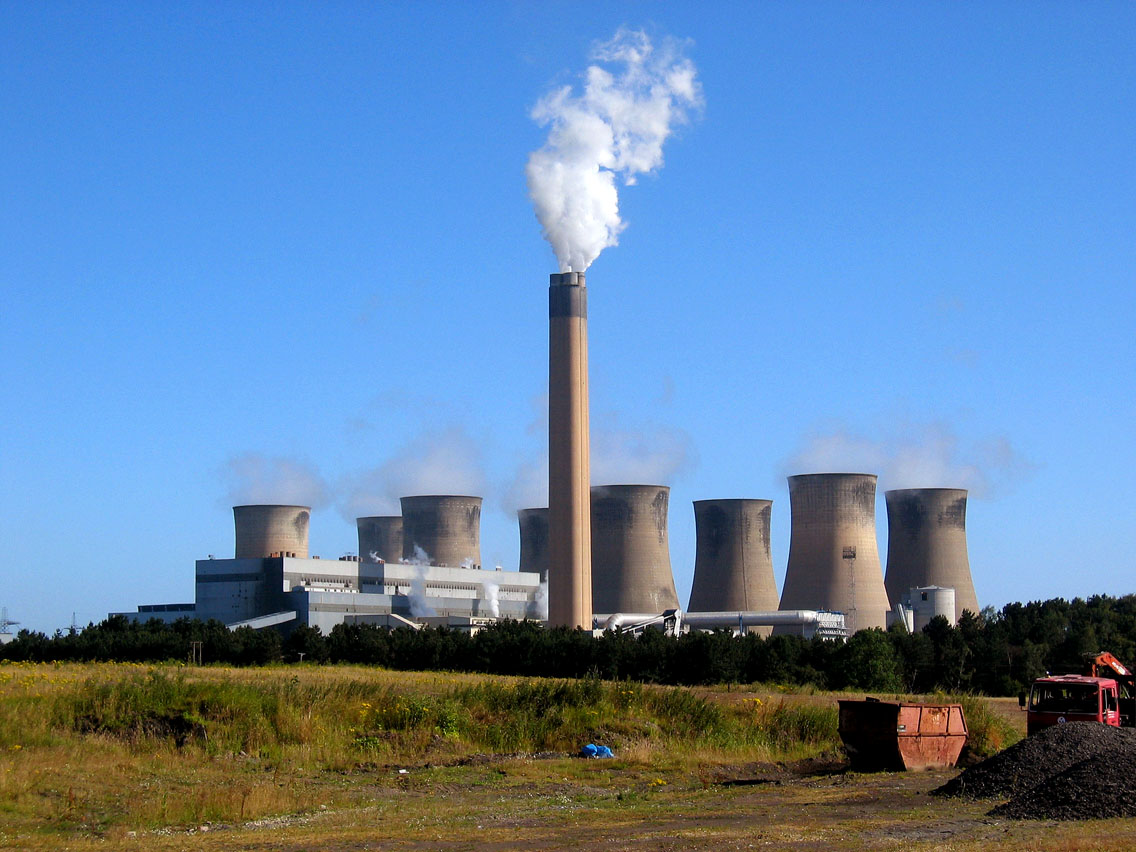
Eggborough power station

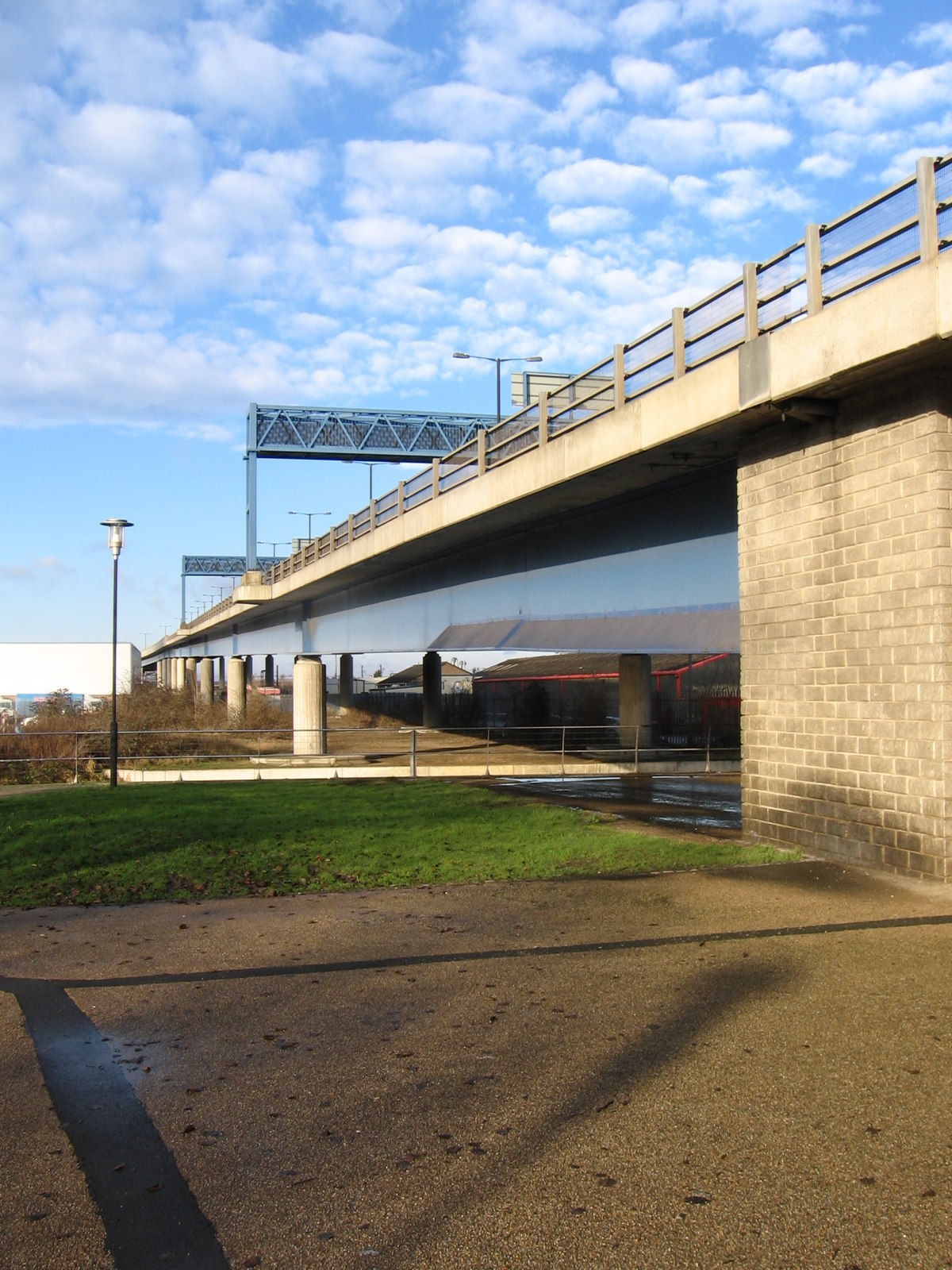
The road just after St Mary's Roundabout

The southern end of the A19 starts at the St Mary's Roundabout with the A630 and A638 just to the north of Doncaster itself near to the parish church. It leaves the A638 at the next roundabout as Bentley Road, and then winds its way over the East Coast Main Line, which it follows through Selby and York, through the suburb of Bentley.

Much of the course of the southern section of the A19 runs through the old Yorkshire coalfield. It meets the B1220 for Carcroft and goes through Owston. The surrounds are mostly flat as the road heads towards the M62. It enters North Yorkshire where it crosses the River Went near Walden Stubbs. It meets the M62 at junction 34.

From the M62, the village of Eggborough has been bypassed in recent years, with the new road travelling from this roundabout to near the site of Eggborough Power Station. Close by is Whitley Bridge and the A19 then meets the A645 at a roundabout and its previous alignment to the north of the village, before travelling through Chapel Haddlesey where it crosses the River Aire and the small village of Burn.

=== Selby–Thirsk ===
The £5 million 5-mile (8 km) Riccall and Barlby bypass opened in October 1987. This improved junctions with the A63 (Howden) and A163 (Holme-on-Spalding-Moor). The A63 and A19 meet at a roundabout near a large pickle factory. The A19 heads towards Riccall, following what was the East Coast Main Line before the Selby Diversion was built. Where the road leaves the old railway, the Trans Pennine Trail follows along the old track. At Escrick, the road enters the Vale of York, and passes the BP York Road Garage, the Parsonage Hotel and St Helen's Church. Next is Deighton, passing the White Swan Inn, then it heads towards Crockey Hill. It meets the A64 near the headquarters of Persimmon plc.

The York Northern By-Pass (A1237) is a substitute for the A19 through York. There road makes a left turn for Tollerton and goes through Tollerton Forest. Heading northward, the section between York and Thirsk was not helped much by the opening of the £5 million 3-mile (5 km) Easingwold Bypass in November 1994, as the road remained single carriageway, starting at a roundabout. There is a left turn for Raskelf. It meets the A168 from the south, and the old route through Thirsk is now the A170, then the A61. The bypass meets the A61 and A168 (for Northallerton) at a junction near South Kilvington.

=== Thirsk–Billingham ===
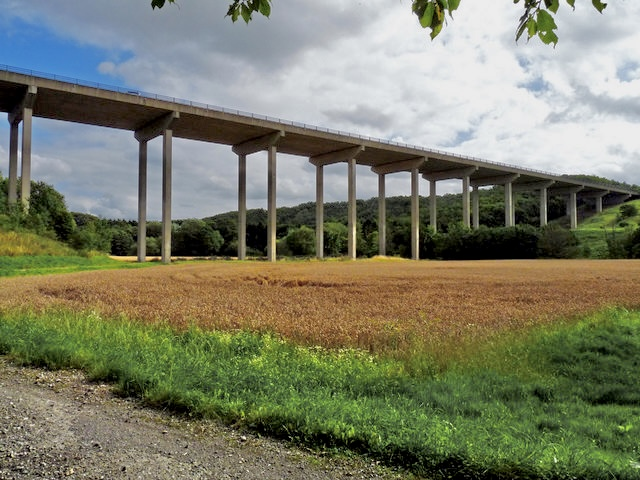
Leven Viaduct

North of Thirsk, the A19 takes over from the A168 as the link from the A1 to Teesside and becomes a fast dual carriageway with mostly grade separated interchanges. The five-mile £4.4 million Thirsk bypass was opened on 5 September 1972 by Robin Turton, Baron Tranmire, the local MP (from 1929), with a flypast by four Royal Air Force Vickers Varsity aircraft – RAF Topcliffe is to the south-west of Thirsk. It passes North Kilvington, and the £0.3 million South of Knayton (at Swan Lane) to north of Thirsk bypass section opened in the early 1970s. It climbs slightly past the junction at Knayton near Borrowby and skirting the western edge of the North York Moors, meeting the A684 (for Northallerton) at Clack Lane End after passing through Leake and by the Haynes Arms. The Borrowby diversion opened in the late 1960s. The £1.1 million south of Clack Lane End to north end of Borrowby diversion opened in the early 1970s, built by A.F. Budge. The Cleveland Tontine to Clack Lane End improvement opened in the early 1970s. It drops towards the Cleveland Tontine at the junction with the A172 (for Stokesley and Guisborough). 1 mile (1.6 km) later, it passes the BP Exelby Services on both sides of the road. Eventually after passing the Crathorne/Yarm exit the road passes over the Leven viaduct towards Teesside. From the Crathorne bypass, the road leaves the old route to the east, with the old route now being the A67 then the A135 through Stockton.

The Tees Viaduct was opened on 17 November 1975 by John Gilbert. The Teesside Diversion was built by Cementation Construction, from April 1972, costing £10,239,606. The 6,350 ft bridge, had a dual carriageway with three lanes, built by Cleveland Bridge. This was stage 1 of the Teesside Diversion. Stage 2 was south to Crathorne.

About 2 miles (3.2 km) from the Parkway Turn (A174) in Middlesbrough the road is raised slightly, overlooking Thornaby industrial estate and the town of Ingleby Barwick, giving clues that Teesside is imminent.

=== Billingham–Seaton Burn ===
Past Teesside the A19 enters rural landscape, meeting the former route through Billingham, where it enters the borough of Hartlepool. There is a right turn for Dalton Piercy at the Windmill Motel, and two link roads into Elwick, to the east, only accessible from the southbound carriageway. At Sheraton with Hulam, there is an intersection for the B1280 (for Wingate to the west), and the A179 (for Hartlepool, to the east). At this intersection the road enters County Durham. The route over Sedgewick Hill has been improved to the east. There is staggered crossroads, for Hutton Henry, to the left. There used to be a right turn for Castle Eden, now accessible only from the southbound carriageway. North of here, the Castle Eden Diversion opened in the early 1970s. It crosses a former railway (now NCN 1 and 14), and meets the A181 (for Wheatley Hill and Durham), and the B1281 (for Hesleden) at an intersection, and passes west of Shotton, where it joins the former route. There is a large intersection at Burnhope Way Roundabout for Shotton Colliery and a large industrial estate, to the west, and the B1320 for the new town of Peterlee, to the east. A flyover was constructed in the early 1990s to replace the previous roundabout, known locally as the Turnpike.

The 3.5-mile Easington and Cold Hesledon Diversion opened in the early 1970s. There is an access road to the south from Easington and the A1086 (for Peterlee and Hartlepool) has limited access to the northbound and from the southbound routes. There is an intersection for the A182 (for Hetton-le-Hole), and limited access from the B1283 (for Easington Village), with no access from the southbound route. The former route north of Easington is the B1432 (to the east). At Cold Hesledon, there is an intersection for the A182 (to Seaham, to the east) and the B1285 (for Murton, to the west). The three-mile New Seaham and Seaton Diversion opened in the early 1970s, with the former route now the B1285 through Dalton-le-Dale. The eight miles of sections from Easington to Seaham were built by A. R. Carmichael in late 1971, and made the A19 from Thirsk to Sunderland completely dual-carriageway, with the contract awarded in October 1969. At Seaton with Slingley, there is a limited-access (to and from the south) intersection for the A1018, for Sunderland and Ryhope. At the same point there is a limited-access intersection (to and from the north) for the B1404 for Seaton and Houghton-le-Spring. The former route through the south of Sunderland is now the B1522. At the point where a former railway crosses (now NCN Route 1) the road enters the City of Sunderland.

At this point, the A19 makes a large deviation from its former route, by bypassing Sunderland from the west. Its former route went near the coast. The 8.75-mile Sunderland Bypass opened as the A108, and was built by W.C. French, with fourteen bridges and five underpasses, with the contract awarded in February 1970. The A108 was also previously the number of an A road in north London, for a re-routed A10 to Hoddesdon. At Herrington the A19 meets the A690 (for Houghton-le-Spring) and the B1286 at an interchange. It is crossed by the B1286. At Offerton and Hastings Hill there is an interchange with the A183 road (for Penshaw and Pennywell). The road crosses the River Wear on the Hylton Bridge, which was built as the A108 in 1975 by W.C. French (Construction) Ltd. At North Hylton, there is an interchange with the A1231 (for Washington and Castletown).

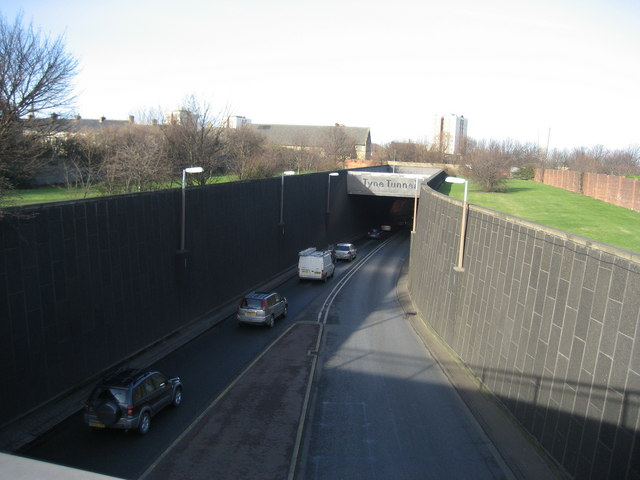
Southern entrance of the Tyne Tunnel

At Testo's Roundabout with the A184 (for Gateshead and The Boldons), the A19 originally ended as the A1 took over to run through the Tyne Tunnel, before that classification became assigned to the Newcastle Western Bypass from the Angel of the North to Kingston Park. To the east the A19 now approaches the Tyne Tunnel, where a second tunnel opened in 2011 to relieve traffic congestion. There is a limited access junction (from the north) for Hedworth, and the road is crossed by the Green Line of the Tyne and Wear Metro. It meets the A194 (for South Shields) at an interchange. At the Jarrow Interchange, there is a roundabout for the A185 (for Hebburn) and the B1297 at the start of the single-carriageway £13 million Tyne Tunnel, opened in October 1967 as the A108.

The A19 continues in a north-westerly direction through North Tyneside past Killingworth and Cramlington, rejoining the current A1, just north of Newcastle at Seaton Burn.

== Junction list ==
County	Location	mi	km	Destinations	Notes
South Yorkshire	Doncaster	0.0	0.0	A630 (Markets Roundabout) to A18 / A638 / M18 / M180 / A1(M) / M1 – Scunthorpe, Sheffield, Rotherham, Bawtry, Thorne, The SOUTH, Station, Doncaster Lakeside, Racecourse	southern terminus
South Yorkshire	Doncaster	0.1	0.16	St George's Bridge	
South Yorkshire	Doncaster	0.6	0.97	A638 (St. Mary's Roundabout) to A1 / A635 – The NORTH, Wakefield, Barnsley, High Melton, Sprotbrough, Scawthorpe, Cusworth Hall	
South Yorkshire	Bentley	2	3.2	(Playfairs Corner) - Barnby Dun, Arksey, Millfields Ind Est	
South Yorkshire	Toll Bar	3.5	5.6	(Adwick Lane) - Adwick, Park & Ride	
South Yorkshire	Adwick le Street	3.9	6.3	(Bentley Moor Lane) - Carcroft Ind Est	
South Yorkshire	Carcroft	5	8.0	B1220 (Askern Road) – Adwick le Street, Carcroft, Skellow	eastern terminus of B1220
South Yorkshire	Owston	5.6	9.0	(Rockley Lane / Sutton Road) - Thorpe-in-Balne, Sutton, Campsall	
South Yorkshire	Askern	6.5	10.5	(Sutton Road) - Sutton, Burghwallis	Trucks over 7.5 tonnes prohibited, except for access
South Yorkshire	Askern	6.9	11.1	(Station Road) - Askern Ind Estate, Moss, Sykehouse	
South Yorkshire	Askern	7.1	11.4	(Campsall Road) - Askern Cemetery, Campsall	
South Yorkshire	Norton	7.8	12.6	(Norton Common Road) - Norton	Trucks over 7.5 tonnes prohibited, except for access
North Yorkshire	south of Whitley	10.9	17.5	(Fulham Lane / Balne Moor Road) - Womersley, Darrington, Balne, Pollington, Snaith	Trucks over 7.5 tonnes prohibited, except for access heading towards Womersley
North Yorkshire	Whitley	12.1	19.5	(Whitefield Lane) - Cridling Stubbs, Darrington	
North Yorkshire	Whitley	12.3	19.8	M62 (Whitley Bridge Interchange) – Leeds, Manchester, Goole, Hull	
North Yorkshire	Eggborough	13.1	21.1	(High Eggborough Lane) - High Eggborough	Trucks over 7.5 tonnes prohibited, except for access
North Yorkshire	Eggborough	13.3	21.4	A645 (Weeland Road) to A614 – Goole, Pontefract, Ferrybridge, Knottingley, Eggborough, Snaith	
North Yorkshire	north of Eggborough	13.8	22.2	To A645 (Selby Road) – Pontefract, Ferrybridge, Knottingley, Eggborough	
North Yorkshire	northwest of Hensall	14.4	23.2	(Wand Lane) - Hensall, Gowdall	
North Yorkshire	Chapel Haddlesey	15.2	24.5	(Millfield Road) - West Haddlesey, Temple Hirst, Hirst Courtney	
North Yorkshire	Burn	16.9	27.2	(Park Lane) - Gliding Club	
North Yorkshire	Brayton	17.7	28.5	A63 to A1(M) / A1238 / A1041 – Leeds, Hull, York, Gateforth, Thorpe Willoughby, Snaith, Selby Abbey, Station	
North Yorkshire	Brayton	18.2	29.3	(Barff Lane / Brayton Lane) - Thorpe Willoughby, Hambleton, Camblesforth, Carlton	
North Yorkshire	Brayton	18.5	29.8	(Foxhill Lane) - Brayton & District Cemetery	
North Yorkshire	Selby	19.1	30.7	Selby War Memorial Hospital	
North Yorkshire	Selby	19.1	30.7	(Westfield Road) - Selby Cemetery	
North Yorkshire	Selby	19.5	31.4	To A63 (Narrow Lanes) / A1238 / B1223 – Leeds, Cawood	eastern terminus of A1238
North Yorkshire	Selby	19.7	31.7	(New Lane) - Market Cross Car Park	
North Yorkshire	Selby	19.8	31.9	A1041 (Park Street) to A614 – Snaith, Goole, Selby College, Station, Carlton Towers	After this junction, trucks over 7.5 tonnes are prohibited until Qusegate; northern terminus of A1041
North Yorkshire	Selby	20.8	33.5	(Barlby Road) - Barlby	
North Yorkshire	northeast of Selby	21.1	34.0	A63 (Sugar Factory Roundabout) / M62 west / A1(M) – Leeds, Doncaster, Brayton	Drawbridge after roundabout in the Leeds direction
North Yorkshire	Barlby	21.5	34.6	A63 (Barlby Roundabout) / M62 east / M18 – Barlby, Hull, Howden, Osgodby, Cliffe, Hemingbrough	Trucks over 7.5 tonnes prohibited from Highfield View, except for access
North Yorkshire	Barlby	22.5	36.2	A163 (Market Weighton Road) – Market Weighton, South Duffield, North Duffield, Skipwith	
North Yorkshire	Riccall	23.9	38.5	(Main Street) - Riccall, Kelfield, Cawood	
North Yorkshire	Riccall	24.5	39.4	(York Road) - Riccall, Kelfield, Cawood	
North Yorkshire	north of Riccall	24.5	39.4	(York Road) - Hollicarrs, Hollicarrs Holiday Park	
North Yorkshire	Escrick	26.8	43.1	To B1222 – Sherburn-in-Elmet, Cawood, Stillingfleet	
North Yorkshire	Escrick	27.2	43.8	(Carr Lane) - Escrick	
North Yorkshire	Escrick	27.5	44.3	(Skipwith Road) - Skipwith, Wheldrake	
North Yorkshire	south of Deighton	27.9	44.9	(Naburn Lane) - Naburn	
North Yorkshire	Deighton	28.2	45.4	(Main Street) - Deighton	For Deighton village only
North Yorkshire	Crockey Hill	29.7	47.8	(Wheldrake Lane) - Wheldrake Ind Estate, Thornganby	Trucks over 7.5 tonnes prohibited, except for access
North Yorkshire	south of York	30.7	49.4	A64 (Fulford Interchange) to A59 – Leeds, Thirsk, Harrogate, Scarborough, Designer Outlet, York Community Stadium	
North Yorkshire	Fulford	31.1	50.1	B1222 (Naburn Lane) – Sherburn-in-Elmet, Naburn, Stillingfleet, Cawood, York Marina	
North Yorkshire	Fulford	31.3	50.4	(Thornton Road) - Fulford Cemetery	
North Yorkshire	Fulford	31.8	51.2	(Heslington Lane) - Fulford Golf Club, Fulford Community Sports Club	
North Yorkshire	Fulford	32	51	(Broadway) - University of York, Heslington	
North Yorkshire	York	32.3	52.0	(Hospital Fields Road) - Army Reserve Centre	
North Yorkshire	York	32.5	52.3	A1036 (Fulford Road) – City Centre, Station	Coaches prohibited through the city centre
North Yorkshire	York	32.5	52.3	Start of York Inner Ring Road and A19xA1036 concurrency	
North Yorkshire	York	32.8	52.8	(Kent Street) - Q-Park Barbican	
North Yorkshire	York	33	53	To A64 (Walmgate) / A1079 (Lawrence Street) / A166 – Leeds, Hull, Scarborough, Bridlington, University, Heslington, Osbaldwick, Yorkshire Air Museum, Yorkshire Museum of Farming	Coaches prohibited from Walmgate
North Yorkshire	York	33.5	53.9	(Peasholme Green / Layerthorpe) - City Centre, Heworth, Ebor Industrial Estate	Coaches prohibited from Peasholme Green
North Yorkshire	York	33.7	54.2	A1036 (Monkgate) to A64 – Scarborough	Coaches prohibited from Monkgate
North Yorkshire	York	33.9	54.6	B1363 – District Hospital, Helmsley	
North Yorkshire	York	34.1	54.9	A1036 (St Leonard's Place) – Station, National Railway Museum	
North Yorkshire	York	34.1	54.9	End of York Inner Ring Road and A19xA1036 concurrency	
North Yorkshire	York	34.7	55.8	(Clifton Green) - Acomb	
North Yorkshire	Rawcliffe	36.3	58.4	(Manor Lane) - Rawcliffe Industrial Estate	
North Yorkshire	Rawcliffe	36.4	58.6	A1237 to A59 / A64 / A1079 – Harrogate, Leeds, Scarborough, Hull, Selby, Wigginton, Acomb, Yorkshire Air Museum	
North Yorkshire	Skelton	37.9	61.0	(Stripe Lane / St Giles Road) - Overton, Skelton	Separate junctions
North Yorkshire	Shipton by Beningbrough	39.3	63.2	(Overton Road) - Overton, Beningbrough, Newton-on-Ouse, Linton-on-Ouse, Beningbrough Hall	
North Yorkshire	Shipton by Beningbrough	39.7	63.9	(Station Lane) - Beningbrough	
North Yorkshire	Shipton by Beningbrough	39.9	64.2	(East Lane) - Wigginton, Haxby	
North Yorkshire	north of Shipton-by-Beningbrough	40.8	65.7	(Chapman's Lane) - Beningbrough, Newton-on-Ouse, Linton-on-Ouse, Beningbrough Hall, RAF Linton-on-Ouse	
North Yorkshire	east of Tollerton	43.2	69.5	(Warehill Lane) - Tollerton, Helperby	
North Yorkshire	Cross Lanes	44.1– 44.2	71.0– 71.1	(Baston Lane / Sykes Lane) - Tollerton, Linton-on-Ouse, Huby, Aldwark Manor, Sutton Park	Separate junctons
North Yorkshire	north of Cross Lanes	44.9	72.3	(Forest Lane) - Alne	
North Yorkshire	vicinity of Easingwold	45.8	73.7	(York Road) - Easingwold	
North Yorkshire	vicinity of Easingwold	48.3	77.7	(Thirsk Road) - Easingwold	
North Yorkshire	northeast of Raskelf	49	79	Raskelf, Tholthorpe, Helperby	
North Yorkshire	south of Thormanby	49.7– 49.8	80.0– 80.1	(New Road / Unnamed road) - Helperby, Boroughbridge, Husthwaite, Coxwold	
North Yorkshire	Birdforth	51.6	83.0	Birdforth village only	
North Yorkshire	east of Hutton Sessay	52	84	(Church Lane / Quarry Banks) - Hutton Sessay, Sessay, Dalton, Topcliffe, Carlton Husthwaite, Coxwold	Trucks over 7.5 tonnes prohibited from Church Lane
North Yorkshire	north of Hutton Sessay	52.8	85.0	(Hutton Rae Lane) - Sessay, Dalton, Topcliffe	
North Yorkshire	west of Thirkleby	54	87	(Low Lane) - Byland Abbey, Thirkleby, Coxwold, Helmsley	
North Yorkshire	west of Bagby Airfield	54.5	87.7	(Unnamed road / Bagby Lane) - Sowerby, Dalton, Bagby, Balk, Kilburn	Separate junctions
North Yorkshire	vicinity of Thirsk	56	90	A168 (Blakey Lane) to A1(M) / A61 / B1448 – Ripon, Sowerby, Lightwater Valley, Wetherby	
North Yorkshire	Thirsk	56.5	90.9	A170 – Thirsk, Scarborough, Ripon, Wetherby, The SOUTH, Thirsk Services, Thirsk Industrial Park	Wetherby and The SOUTH signposted southbound only
North Yorkshire	Thirsk	58.1	93.5	A168 / A61 to A170 – Northallerton, Thirsk, Scarborough, The World of James Herriot, Castle Howard, Flamingo Land	Scarborough and Thirsk signposted southbound only; Northallerton signposted northbound only
North Yorkshire	Knayton	60.4	97.2	(Oaktree Bank / Unnamed road) - Knayton, Borrowby	Oaktree Bank only accessible heading northbound towards Teesside; Unnamed road only accessible heading southbound towards Thirsk
North Yorkshire	southwest of Over Silton	62.5	100.6	(Cotcliffe Bank / Leake Lane) - Northallerton, Nether Silton, Over Silton, Kepwick	
North Yorkshire	northwest of Over Silton	64.4	103.6	(Low Bank) - Over Silton	
North Yorkshire	east of Kirby Sigston	64.8	104.3	Kirby Sigston, Northallerton	
North Yorkshire	southwest of Thimbley	65.1	104.8	Thimbley	
North Yorkshire	west of Osmotherley	66.3	106.7	A684 – Northallerton, Osmotherley, Brompton	
North Yorkshire	southeast of East Harlsey	67.6	108.8	A172 – Hutton Rudby, Stokesley, Mount Grace Priory, Potto, Cleveland Tontine	Hutton Rudby, Potto and Cleveland Tontine signposted northbound only
North Yorkshire	west of Ingleby Arncliffe	68.5	110.2	East Harlsey, Ingleby Arncliffe	Separate junctions
North Yorkshire	west of Ingleby Arncliffe	68.9	110.9	Ingleby Arncliffe, Ingleby Cross, Exelby Services North	
North Yorkshire	east of East Rounton	70	110	(Trenholme Lane / Unnamed road) - Potto, East Rounton, Welbury, Hutton Rudby, Swainby, Stokesley	Swainby and Stokesley signposted southbound only
North Yorkshire	southwest of Hutton Rudby	70.7	113.8	(Green Lane) - Picton	
North Yorkshire	southeast of Kirklevington	72.9	117.3	A67 – Yarm, Kirklevington, Crathorne, Picton	Picton signposted southbound only; Kirklevington and Yarm signposted northbound only
North Yorkshire	Thornaby	77.3	124.4	A174 (Parkway Junction) to A1044 – Teesport, Thornaby, Redcar, Whitby, Yarm, Wilton, Captain Cook Birthplace Museum, Ormesby Hall, Ingleby Barwick	Whitby, Yarm and Wilton signposted southbound only
North Yorkshire	Thornaby	78.8	126.8	A1130 – Thornaby, Acklam, Middlesbrough	Middlesbrough signposted southbound only
North Yorkshire	Thornaby	79.7	128.3	A66 – Darlington, Stockton-on-Tees, Middlesbrough, Teesside Airport	
County Durham	Stockton-on-Tees	80.7	129.9	A1046 (Portrack Junction) – Stockton-on-Tees, Haverton Hill, Middlesbrough	
County Durham	Stockton-on-Tees	82.5	132.8	A139 – Norton, Billingham	No access southbound towards Middlesbrough
County Durham	Stockton-on-Tees	82.9	133.4	A1027 – Billingham, Norton, Billingham, North Tees General Hospital	
County Durham	Stockton-on-Tees	85.2	137.1	A1(M) / A689 – Durham, Bishop Auckland, Hartlepool, Saltholme, National Museum of the Royal Navy, Hartlepool Marina, Sedgefield, Wynyard Park, Wolviston	
County Durham	north of Wolviston	86.6	139.4	A689 / A1185 – Hartlepool, Seal Sands	No access northbound towards Sunderland
County Durham	vicinity of Elwick	89.4	143.9	(Coal Lane / Unnamed road) - Trimdon, Elwick	Trucks over 7.5 tonnes prohibited from Elwick; No access to Coal Lane heading southbound towards Stockton; No access to Elwick heading northbound towards Sunderland
County Durham	vicinity of Elwick	89.9	144.7	(North Lane) - Elwick	Trucks over 7.5 tonnes prohibited from Elwick; No access to North Lane heading northbound towards Sunderland
County Durham	Sheraton	90.8	146.1	A179 / B1280 – Hartlepool, Wingate	
County Durham	east of Hutton Henry	92.5	148.9	To (Front Street) - Hutton Henry, Wingate	Wingate signposted northbound only
County Durham	Eden Vale	92.9	149.5	(Stockton Road) - Castle Eden	No access heading northbound towards Sunderland
County Durham	northeast of Wingate	94.1	151.4	A181 / B1281 – Durham, Blackhall, Castle Eden, Wingate	
County Durham	Peterlee	95.2	153.2	(Passfield Way) - Shotton, Peterlee, Castle Eden Dene	No access to Passfield Way heading northbound towards Sunderland
County Durham	Peterlee	95.8	154.2	B1320 – Peterlee, Horden, Shotton Colliery, Castle Eden Dene	Horden and Castle Eden Dene signposted northbound only
County Durham	vicinity of Easington	97.4	156.8	A1086 – Easington, Horden	No access to the A1086 heading northbound towards Sunderland
County Durham	vicinity of Easington	97.8	157.4	A182 / B1283 – Houghton-le-Spring, Easington, Hetton, Durham	No access to the A182 / B 1283 heading southbound towards Teesside
County Durham	west of Hawthorn	99	159	Easington Services	
County Durham	Murton	99.5	160.1	A182 / B1285 – Seaham, Murton, Hawthorn, Dalton Park	
County Durham	west of Seaham	102	164	A1018 / B1404 – Sunderland, Ryhope, Seaham, Houghton-le-Spring	Ryhope, Seaham, Houghton-le-Spring and B1404 signposted southbound only
Tyne and Wear	Sunderland	105	169	A690 to A1(M) – Durham, Sunderland, Houghton-le-Spring, Doxford Park, Silksworth	A1(M) signposted southbound only
Tyne and Wear	Sunderland	107	172	A183 – Chester-le-Street, Sunderland	
Tyne and Wear	Sunderland	108	174	A1231 – Washington, Sunderland (North), Gateshead, Stadium of Light, National Glass Centre	Stadium of Light, Washington and National Glass Centre signposted northboud only
Tyne and Wear	Sunderland	110	180	A1290 (Downhil Lane Junction) – Nissan (Offices), Industrial Est, Boldon, Hylton Castle, Transport Museum	No access southbound towards Teesside; Southbound access via Testo's Junction
Tyne and Wear	Boldon Colliery	110	180	A184 (Testo's Junction) to A194(M) – Newcastle, Gateshead, Boldon, Durham, Sunderland	Durham signposted southbound only; Slip road to A1290 Nissan (Offices) on southbound exit
Tyne and Wear	Jarrow-Boldon Colliery boundary	112	180	Boldon Colliery	
Tyne and Wear	Jarrow	112	180	A194 (Lindisfarne Roundabout) – South Shields, Gateshead, Newcastle	Height restriction of 4.9 metres; Newcastle signposted northbound only
Tyne and Wear	Jarrow	113	182	To A185 – South Shields, Jarrow, Hebburn, Jarrow Hall, Port of Tyne	
Tyne and Wear	Jarrow	114– 115	183– 185	Tyne Tunnel	
Tyne and Wear	Wallsend	115	185	A193 (Howden) – North Shields, Wallsend, Tyne Tunnel Trading Est	
Tyne and Wear	Wallsend	116	187	A1058 (Silverlink) – Newcastle, Tynemouth, Whitley Bay, Priory and Castle, St. Mary's Island	
Tyne and Wear	Holystone-West Allotment boundary	118	190	A191 (Holystone) / A186 – Whitley Bay, Gosforth, Earsdon, Wallsend	
Tyne and Wear	east of Killingworth	120	190	A1056 / B1322 – Killingworth, Seghill, Backworth, Gosforth Park	Seghill signposted northbound only; Backworth and Gosforth Park signposted southbound
Northumberland	Annitsford	122	196	A189 (Moor Farm Roundabout) / B1505 / A1171 – Annitsford, Ashington, Blyth, Newcastle (East), Cramlington Ind Estates, East Cramlington, Northumberia Hospital	
Northumberland	Cramlington boundary	122	196	A171 (Dudley Lane) / B1319 – Cramlington, Northumberland Business Park, Dudley	
Tyne and Wear	Seaton Burn	124	200	A1 (Seaton Burn Roundabout) / B1318 / A1068 – Newcastle, Morpeth, Seaton Burn, Cramlington, Dinnington, Blagdon Hall	Northern terminus
1.000 mi = 1.609 km; 1.000 km = 0.621 mi

== Distinctions ==
In 2024, the A19 topped a survey of road users by Transport Focus, with an 85% satisfaction rating, up from 6th place with 77% in 2023.

== Incidents ==
In November 1986 a tanker loaded with toluene overturned and caught fire near Brookfield. The driver and the occupants of three cars were injured. The fire burned for eight hours and led to residents being warned by Cleveland Police of potentially toxic fumes. The fire service later criticised the police response as a "massive overreaction".

In 1988 a stretch of the road in Teesside was notoriously accident prone. In a now famous interview, then local councillor Mr Davidson appeared on TV to declare the road safe. During the interview, a car lost control and veered off the road while another car was rear-ended directly behind him.

In June 2008 a fuel tanker began leaking oil from its engine covering a mile-long stretch, including a bend, before stopping near Hartlepool. A small fire broke out and cars began sliding, although none crashed. The fire service shut down the road to clean it.
