= Kilvington (disambiguation) =

Kilvington is a hamlet and civil parish in Nottinghamshire, England.

Kilvington may also refer to:

- Kilvington Grammar School, an independent co-educational day school Ormond, Victoria, Australia
- North Kilvington, a village and civil parish in the Hambleton District of North Yorkshire, England
- South Kilvington, a village and civil parish in the Hambleton District of North Yorkshire, England

== People with the surname ==
- Patrick Kilvington (1922–1990), Australian artist
- Richard Kilvington (c. 1305–1361), English scholastic philosopher at the University of Oxford
