= Hesledon Moor East =

Site of Special Scientific Interest in Durham, UK

- Location within County Durham
- Location: MAGiC MaP
- Nearest town: Seaham
- Coordinates: 54°48′47″N 1°22′48″W
- Area: 6.0 ha (15 acres)
- Established: 1998
- Governing body: Natural England
- Website: Hesledon Moor East SSSI

Hesledon Moor East is a Site of Special Scientific Interest in the County Durham district in east County Durham, England. It is located on the southern edge of the village of Murton, 10 km south of Sunderland and a little under 2 km north-east of Hesledon Moor West SSSI.

The site consists of two non-contiguous parcels of land. Most of the larger portion is covered by unimproved neutral grassland, a habitat that was once common on the Magnesian Limestone plateau of east Durham but is now reduced to scattered fragments, of which this is the best surviving example. The dominant grassland species include common bent, Agrostis capillaris, sweet vernal-grass, Anthoxanthum odoratum, and crested dog's-tail, Cynosurus cristatus. In places the grassland displays a weakly developed acidic character; common bent and sheep's fescue, Festuca ovina, are the dominant species.

A short distance to the south, the smaller parcel supports a base and nutrient-rich soligenous fen-type vegetation in which the dominant species varies between purple moor-grass, Molinia caerulea, and meadowsweet, Filipendula ulmaria.
