= Saltholmen =

Saltholmen may refer to:

- Saltholmen, Gothenburg, Sweden
- Saltholmen Lighthouse in Lillesand, Norway

== See also ==
- Saltholm, an island in Denmark
- Saltholme, a nature reserve in England
