= Holystone (disambiguation) =

Holystone is a sandstone used for scrubbing and whitening the wooden decks of ships.

Holystone may also refer to:

- Holystone, Northumberland, a village in England (near Rothbury)
- Holystone, Tyne and Wear, a village in England (near Whitley Bay)

== See also ==
- Holystone Slope, a glacier in Antarctica
