= Hesledon Moor West =

- Location within County Durham
- Location: MAGiC MaP
- Nearest town: Seaham
- Coordinates: 54°48′6″N 1°24′1″W
- Area: 7.4 ha (18 acres)
- Established: 1984
- Governing body: Natural England
- Website: Hesledon Moor West SSSI

Hesledon Moor West is a Site of Special Scientific Interest in the County Durham district in east County Durham, England. It is located 1 km east of the village of South Hetton, some 12 km south of Sunderland and a little under 2 km south-west of Hesledon Moor East SSSI.

Within this small site there is a diversity of vegetation types, which have developed on the acidic glacial drift overlying Magnesian Limestone that is characteristic of much of lowland Durham. Plant communities range from fen and carr to wet and dry heath.
