= Sheraton, County Durham =

Village in County Durham, England

Coordinates: 54.709°N 1.317°W

Sheraton
- Location within County Durham
- Population: 118 (2011)
- OS grid reference: NZ441350
- Civil parish: Sheraton with Hulam
- Unitary authority: County Durham
- Ceremonial county: County Durham
- Region: North East
- Country: England
- Sovereign state: United Kingdom
- Post town: TEESSIDE
- Postcode district: TS27
- Police: Durham
- Fire: County Durham and Darlington
- Ambulance: North East

Sheraton is a village in County Durham in England. It is situated a few miles to the north-west of Hartlepool. The A19 road bisects the village. In medieval times there was a more sizable settlement here, first recorded in 1050 AD under the name 'Scurafaton'. In the 19th century Sheraton was part of the Parish of Monkhesleton, and later the civil parish of Sheraton with Hulam. Sheraton Hall and Sheraton Hall Cottage date from the mid 18th century and are Grade II listed.
