= Listed buildings in Owston, South Yorkshire =

Owston is a civil parish in the metropolitan borough of Doncaster, South Yorkshire, England. The parish contains 20 listed buildings that are recorded in the National Heritage List for England. Of these, one is listed at Grade I, the highest of the three grades, one is at Grade II*, the middle grade, and the others are at Grade II, the lowest grade. The parish contains the village of Owston and the surrounding countryside. The most important buildings in the parish are a church, which is listed together with the remains of a cross, and Owston Hall, also listed, together with associated structures. The other listed buildings consist of houses, cottages and associated structures, and farmhouses and farm buildings.

== Key ==
Grade	Criteria
I	Buildings of exceptional interest, sometimes considered to be internationally important
II*	Particularly important buildings of more than special interest
II	Buildings of national importance and special interest

== Buildings ==
Name and location	Photograph	Date	Notes	Grade
All Saints Church; 53.59427°N 1.16895°W		11th century	The church, which has been extended and altered through the centuries, was restored in 1862–65, and in 1872–73 the chancel was partly rebuilt by George Gilbert Scott. The church is built in magnesian limestone, with roofs of lead and tile, and consists of a nave with a clerestory, north and south aisles, a south porch, a north chapel, and a west tower. The tower has three stages, and contains round-headed loops, two-light bell openings, a string course with corner gargoyles, and an embattled parapet with eight crocketed pinnacles.	I
Remains of cross 53.59419°N 1.16938°W	—	Late medieval	The remains of the cross are in the churchyard of All Saints Church, and are in magnesian limestone. The oldest part is the base, which is square with a cut-off corner. The shaft probably dates from the 17th century, and has carvings on each face, and on it is a re-set brass sundial dated 1679 with a decorative gnomon.	II
Home Farmhouse and Garden Cottage; 53.59436°N 1.16984°W	—	Mid 17th century	A pair of houses in magnesian limestone on a chamfered plinth, with quoins, and a Welsh slate roof with moulded gable copings and shaped kneelers. There are two storeys and a T-shaped plan, with Garden Cottage forming a cross-wing. The doorway has a hood mould and a gabled canopy, and the windows are mullioned or mullioned and transomed, some with hood moulds.	II
Owston Hall; 53.59350°N 1.17035°W		Early 18th century	A country house, it was extended in 1794–96, and has since been used for other purposes. It is rendered with a hipped Westmorland slate roof, and has two storeys and basements, and an L-shaped plan. The southeast front has seven bays, the middle three bays under a pediment on giant Ionic pilasters, containing a doorway with a fluted frieze, a cornice on consoles, and a small segmental pediment. The southwest front has three bays with a full-height bow window in the middle bay. To the left is a conservatory added in 1854, and behind and lower is the original hall with a front of five bays.	II*
Vine Cottage; 53.59530°N 1.17064°W	—	Early 18th century	A house that was later altered, it is in magnesian limestone, with quoins, and a Welsh slate roof with chamfered gable copings, shaped kneelers, and a ball finial on the right. The doorways and windows have double-chamfered surrounds, the doorway has a hood mould, and the windows are mullioned with three lights and casements.	II
Chapel House Farmhouse; 53.60632°N 1.12403°W		Mid 18th century	A red brick farmhouse with stone dressings, quoins, floor bands, an eaves cornice, and a Welsh slate roof with coped gables and shaped kneelers. There are two storeys, five bays, and a partial rear outshut. The central doorway has an architrave, a keystone, and a broken segmental pediment on consoles. The windows are casements, and the window above the doorway is blind.	II
Dovecote, Chapel House Farm; 53.60638°N 1.12371°W		Mid 18th century	The dovecote, now converted for residential use, is in red brick on a plinth, with cogged eaves, and a pantile roof with coped gables and shaped kneelers. There are two storeys, two bays, and the gable end faces the road. Between the floors are two rows of pigeon holes and ledges, and at the rear are external steps to an upper floor doorway.	II
Kitchen garden wall, Owston Hall; 53.59461°N 1.17299°W	—	Late 18th century	The wall enclosing the kitchen garden is in red brick with stone copings. The enclosure is rectangular, about 100 metres (330 ft) by 60 metres (200 ft), and the wall is between 3 metres (9.8 ft) and 4 metres (13 ft) high. Part of the north face of the wall is in limestone.	II
Stables and wall, Owston Hall; 53.59444°N 1.17054°W	—	Late 18th century	The stables are in roughcast limestone on a plinth, with a floor band, and hipped roofs of Westmorland slate. There are two storeys and a U-shaped plan, the courtyard enclosed by curving walls with a central gateway, and there is an arcaded walkway at the rear. The centre range has seven bays, and the wings each have three. The middle three bays of the central range project under a pediment, and the central bay has a round-arched recess. The doorway has a fanlight, and the windows are sashes. At the rear is an arcade of eleven bays with a central gateway.	II
Outbuilding to northeast of Vine Cottage; 53.59552°N 1.17008°W	—	Late 18th to early 19th century	The outbuilding is in magnesian limestone, with quoins, stone slate eaves courses, and a pantile roof. There are two storeys and two bays. On the east side is a round-arched entry with a casement window above, and there are external stone steps.	II
Barn, Chapel House Farm; 53.60647°N 1.12390°W	—	c. 1800	The barn is in red brick with coped gables and kneelers, and the rest of the roof missing. There are two storeys and three bays, and it contains central double doors under a segmental arch, and decorative slit vents.	II
Church Lodge; 53.59425°N 1.16793°W	—	Early 19th century	The lodge, which was later extended, is in painted stone, and has twin hipped tile roofs. There is a single storey, a double-depth plan, and three bays. The doorway has a pointed head and a hood mould, and the windows are casements with pointed heads and Y-tracery.	II
Cart shelter, Owston Hall; 53.59479°N 1.17032°W		Early 19th century	The cart shelter is in brick and limestone, partly rendered, with stone slate eaves courses, and a pantile roof. It is tall with a single storey, and consists of two round arches with brick piers and voussoirs spanning the road. On the west side of the roof is a wooden bell turret.	II
Pear Tree Cottage and outbuilding 53.59507°N 1.17066°W	—	Early 19th century (probable)	A stable, converted into a house and outbuilding in about 1980, it is in magnesian limestone, with stone slate eaves courses, and a pantile roof. The house has two storeys and three bays, and to the right is a single-storey outbuilding. In the ground floor is a porch under external steps, two French windows and a casement window. The steps lead to an upper floor French window flanked by casement windows; all the openings have segmental arches. The outbuilding has four doors and two windows, and to the right are two infilled round arches.	II
Cartshed east of Pear Tree Cottage; 53.59510°N 1.17040°W	—	Early 19th century	The cartshed is in brick and limestone, with a brick eaves band, and a hipped slate roof. There is a single storey, and an L-shaped plan with arcades of two and three bays at right angles facing the internal angle. Each bay has a brick arch on a square brick pier on a stone plinth.	II
Outbuilding to rear of Vine Cottage; 53.59562°N 1.17092°W	—	Early 19th century	A coach house and stables, later used for other purposes, it is in magnesian limestone, with stone slate eaves courses, and a pantile roof. There is a single storey and four bays. Each bay has a round arch with brick voussoirs and stone piers.	II
Doncaster Lodge; 53.59298°N 1.16204°W	—	1828	The lodge at the eastern entrance to the grounds of Owston Hall is stuccoed with a tile roof, and is in the form of a single-storey tetrastyle prostyle Greek Doric temple. It has a three-step stylobate, fluted columns, a doorway with an architrave, a full entablature with guttae, triglyphs and mutules, and a pediment. The windows are sashes with moulded sills on shaped brackets, and architraves.	II
Gate and piers, Doncaster Lodge; 53.59288°N 1.16198°W	—	1828 (probable)	The double gates and gate piers are in cast iron. The piers have a triangular section on a moulded plinth, and each has a pyramidal cap.	II
East Farmhouse; 53.58936°N 1.16361°W	—	Early to mid 19th century	The farmhouse is rendered, with quoins, and a hipped stone slate roof. There are two storeys, four bays, and an outshut on the rear right. The doorway has a quoined surround and a hood mould, and the windows are mullioned, with hood moulds.	II
Stableyard Cottages; 53.59471°N 1.17061°W	—	Mid 19th century	A row of three cottages in magnesian limestone, with quoins, and a hipped Welsh slate roof. There are two storeys and five bays. The windows and doorways have chamfered surrounds and hood moulds, and the windows are mullioned.	II
