= Owston, South Yorkshire =

Village and civil parish in South Yorkshire, England

Coordinates: 53.59488°N 1.170388°W

Owston
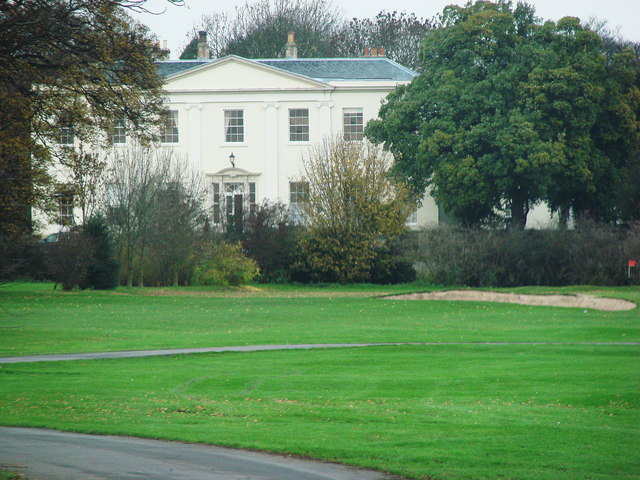
- Owston Hall

- Location within the City of Doncaster Location within South Yorkshire
- Population: 145 (2011 census)
- Civil parish: Owston
- Metropolitan borough: Doncaster
- Metropolitan county: South Yorkshire
- Region: Yorkshire and the Humber
- Country: England
- Sovereign state: United Kingdom
- Post town: DONCASTER
- Postcode district: DN6
- Dialling code: 01302
- Police: South Yorkshire
- Fire: South Yorkshire
- Ambulance: Yorkshire

Owston is a small village and civil parish in the City of Doncaster in rural South Yorkshire, England. Historically part of the West Riding of Yorkshire, the village is situated amongst mixed farmland and woodland 6 miles (9.7 km) north northwest of Doncaster, just west of the A19. It had a population of 170 in 2001, which fell to 145 according to the 2011 Census.

The name 'Owston' is of Old Scandinavian and Old English origin. It means 'East farmstead', being composed of the Old Scandinavian word austr ('east') and the Old English word tun ('farmstead'). In the Domesday Book, the village was recorded as Austhun.

John de St Paul, Archbishop of Dublin, was born in Owston in about 1295. He was sometimes referred to as John de Owston.

Close to the village is Owston Hay Meadows , a site of special scientific interest; it is the second best example of neutral grassland hay meadow in South Yorkshire. The site consists of three small fields which together cover 13½ acres (5½ hectares) and were notified in 1979.

The Grade-I-listed parish church of All Saints dates back to 1180.

Nearby Owston Hall was declared a Grade II listed building in 1967; its grounds are used by the Robin Hood Golf Club of Doncaster.

== See also ==
- Listed buildings in Owston, South Yorkshire
