= Listed buildings in Huby, Hambleton =

Huby is a civil parish in the county of North Yorkshire, England. It contains four listed buildings that are recorded in the National Heritage List for England. All the listed buildings are designated at Grade II, the lowest of the three grades, which is applied to "buildings of national importance and special interest". The parish contains the village of Huby and the surrounding countryside, and all the listed buildings are houses.

== Buildings ==
Name and location	Photograph	Date	Notes
Huby Old Hall; 54.08508°N 1.13288°W	—	Mid 17th century	All that remains of the original hall is the south gable wall, to which a cottage was added in the 18th century. The wall is in red brick, with two storeys, moulded side pilasters and a floor band. In the ground floor is a sash window, and the upper floor has a round arch containing a horizontally-sliding sash window. The cottage is in red-brown brick with stepped eaves and a swept pantile roof. The windows are in recessed segmental arches.
New Parks; 54.05191°N 1.16749°W		17th century	The house is in red brick on a plinth, and has roofs of pantile and tile, with stone coping and kneelers, and raised verges on the garden front. There are two storeys, and the garden front has three bays and a triple-gabled rear wing. On the front is a two-storey gabled porch containing a doorway with panelled reveals, an oblong fanlight and a soffit. The windows are casements.
Kelsit Grange; 54.06474°N 1.16390°W		c. 1700	The farmhouse is in dark red brick, with a floor band, stepped eaves, and a hipped Welsh slate roof. There are two storeys and an L-shaped plan, with a front range of three bays, and a rear outshut. The central doorway has an oblong fanlight, and the windows are sashes under painted flat brick arches. The rear wing gable has tumbled-in brickwork.
Newton Farmhouse and Cottage; 54.08396°N 1.13509°W		Late 18th century (probable)	The farmhouse and attached cottage are in red brick, with a floor band, stepped and dentilled eaves, and a swept pantile roof with raised verges. There are two storeys, and each part has two bays. On the front are two doorways with oblong fanlights, the right one with a doorcase and pediment. The windows in the farmhouse are sashes in architraves, and in the cottage they are horizontally-sliding sashes.
