= Eggborough =

Village and civil parish in North Yorkshire, England

Coordinates: 53.704881°N 1.145592°W

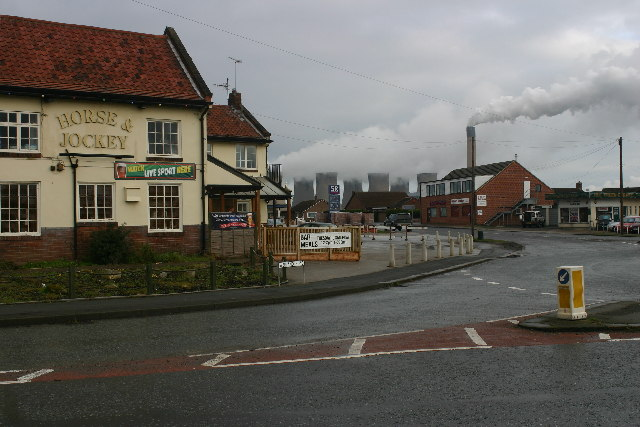
- Horse and Jockey pub in the village, with power station chimney visible in background

- Location within North Yorkshire
- Population: 1,952 (2011 Census)
- OS grid reference: SE565235
- Civil parish: Eggborough
- Unitary authority: North Yorkshire
- Ceremonial county: North Yorkshire
- Region: Yorkshire and the Humber
- Country: England
- Sovereign state: United Kingdom
- Post town: GOOLE
- Postcode district: DN14
- Dialling code: 01977
- Police: North Yorkshire
- Fire: North Yorkshire
- Ambulance: Yorkshire
- UK Parliament: Selby

Eggborough is a village and civil parish in North Yorkshire, England, close to the county borders with South Yorkshire, West Yorkshire and the East Riding.

The village is situated at the junction of the A19 and the A645, approximately 7 miles (11 km) east of Pontefract and 7 miles (11 km) south-west of Selby. It is also close to the M62.

== History ==
Eggborough (as well as High and Low Eggborough) is mentioned in Domesday Book of 1086 and was formerly in the Wapentake of Osgoldcross. The name derives from Ecga's Burh, a fortification belonging to a person named Ecga.

Eggborough was part of the West Riding of Yorkshire until 1 April 1974, when it became part of the Selby District of North Yorkshire. On 1 April 2023 Selby District was abolished and Eggborough became part of the new North Yorkshire unitary authority area.

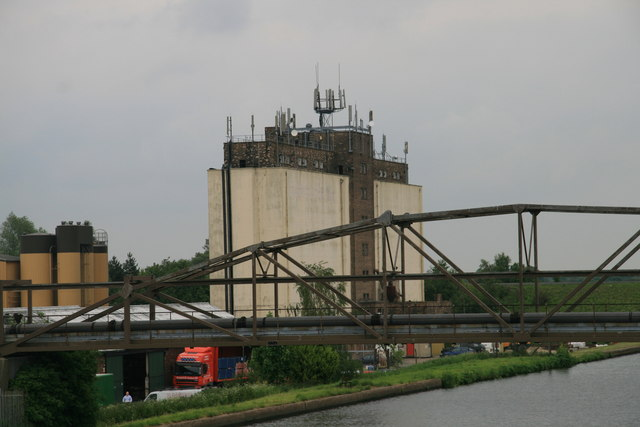
Eggborough Grain Mill

There is a pub in the village, the Horse and Jockey. There is a cricket club, which was formed in 1902 just up from the Horse & Jockey and is the home of Whitley Bridge Cricket Club. There is also a sports and leisure complex in the grounds of the nearby Eggborough Power Station. The complex offers a nine-hole golf course, two miniature football pitches, two full-size football pitches, a bowling green, a children's play area, a miniature railway, a licensed bar, snooker, pool, a green room and a concert hall.

The centre of the village used to be the location of a Bowman's Flour Mill, but it ceased production in 2016.

Close to Eggborough is the site of French-owned Saint-Gobain Glass, Europe's leading producer of float (flat) glass. The plant, which opened in 1998, employs over 170 people and produces 200,000 tonnes (220,000 tons) of flat glass per year.

The large village hall on Selby Road is well used and is shared with the residents of Whitley Bridge, which has no village hall of its own. Other activities take place at the Methodist Hall and the Westfield Centre. The village also has its own football team, Eggborough Eagles, which is based at the Eggborough Sports and Leisure Complex. The Eggborough Eagles were founded in 2011 by Chairman James Lancaster, Secretary Michael Corr and Manager Michael Shaughnessy. They came fourth in their first-ever season recognised in the Selby and District Invitational League.

=== Power stations ===
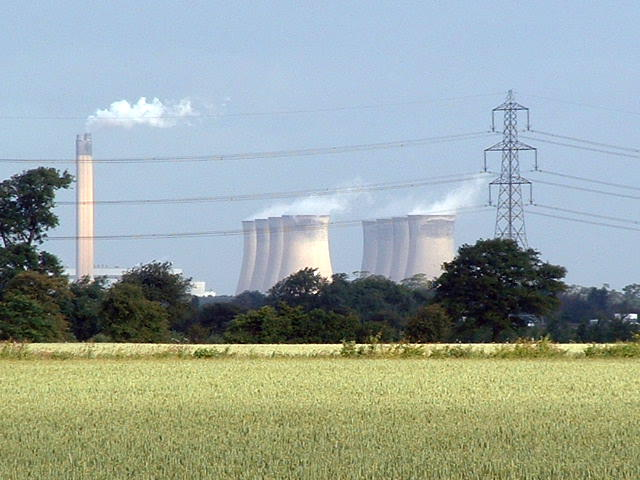
Eggborough Power Station

The village was the site of the coal-fired Eggborough Power Station, built in the 1960s and once owned by British Energy. Its four turbines could produce a total combined output of 1,960 MWe. The power station was due to be closed in 2016, but won a reprieve as a backup generator of power until March 2017 and then again until March 2018, when it shut down for good. The current owners are applying for permission to convert the power station to a gas-fired power plant.

There was also a short lived biomass power station, ARBRE Power Station, built by the Kelda Group, owners of Yorkshire Water, which cost £30 million. The site was developed to burn willow wood grown by local farmers and turn it into gas, however, by August 2002 had gone into liquidation. The capacity of the station was rated at 8 MW. In 2015, DRENL (UK) gained approval to convert the old ARBRE site into an Energy from waste (EfW) plant that would process 200,000 tonnes (220,000 tons) of waste per year to generate 10 MW of electricity.

== Transport ==
The A19 and the A645 intersect in the village, with the A19 being on a north–south axis and having a junction (number 34) on the M62 just south of the village. To the south of the village lies the Aire and Calder Navigation. Eggborough is served by Whitley Bridge railway station on the Pontefract line, but services are limited to just two trains a day to Leeds and only one through to Goole.

== Governance ==
An electoral ward of the same name exists. It stretches north to West Haddlesey and has a total population of 3,763.

It has a parish council consisting of four members. Eggborough was represented on the former Selby District Council by husband-and-wife couple John and Mary McCartney, who are Independents. John is also the North Yorkshire County Councillor for the ward, which includes Eggborough.

== Education ==
Primary-age children attend Whitley and Eggborough Primary School, in Learning Lane on the other side of the M62.
