= Dalton Park =

Shopping centre in County Durham, UK

Dalton Park Outlet & Outdoors
- Aerial view of Dalton Park
- Location: Murton, County Durham, England
- Coordinates: 54.8155°N 1.37457°W
- Address: Dalton Park Outlet & Outdoors, Murton, County Durham, SR7 9HU
- Opened: 10 April 2003; 23 years ago
- Developer: Matthew Fox Developments Ltd
- Manager: Savills UK Limited
- Owner: Patron Capital
- Architect: Napper
- Num. of stores: Over 65
- Num. of anchor tenants: 4
- Floors: 1
- Parking: 1500+ Parking Spaces
- Website: dalton-park.co.uk

Dalton Park is a shopping centre on the outskirts of Murton, County Durham, England, which opened in 2003. As of 2020 it was the largest outlet shopping centre in North East England.

== History ==
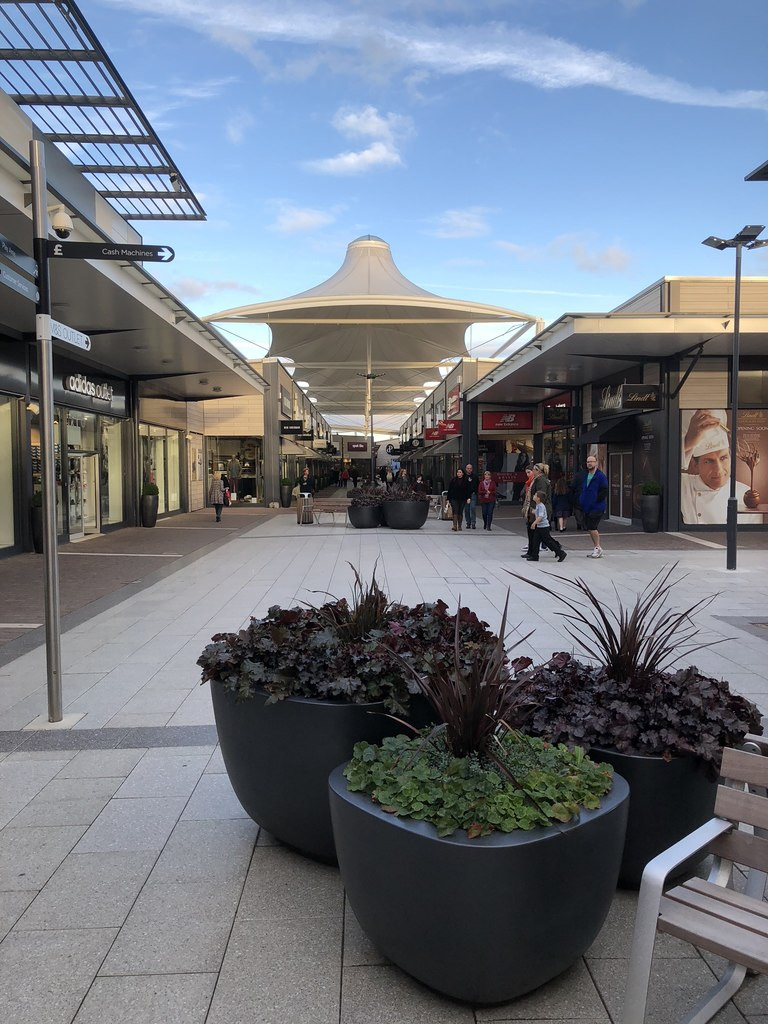
Near the Adidas

The retail park in Murton, County Durham is located above the former Dalton Flatts mine spoil heap, next to the former Murton Colliery. It opened in 2003. ING Real Estate owned Dalton Park until it was sold to Peveril Securities in September 2013. A further off-market sale in June 2015 to Janus Henderson UK Property (PAIF), a division of TH Real Estate acquiring the centre for £38 million.

In September 2016, a seven-screen Cineworld cinema opened and in November 2020, Morrisons also opened with an adjoining petrol station.

In June 2017, almost £2 million was spent on refurbishing the centre including redecoration of shop fronts, improvements to the lighting & flooring and landscaping in front of the centre and improved toilets.

In September 2020 it was announced a number of new retailers would be coming to Dalton Park including Costa Coffee and Molton Brown. As of 2020 it was the largest outlet shopping centre in North East England.

In August 2021, Dalton Park opened a £60,000 accessible play area with features including an extra wide slide, a wheelchair roundabout and easy access ramps.

== Transport Links ==
=== Bus ===
Multiple Go North East services serve Dalton Park. This includes the X6 & 6 services between Peterlee & Sunderland, the X-lines X10 between Middlesbrough & Newcastle upon Tyne, and the 65 service between Durham & Seaham. The Arriva North East 22 service from Durham to Sunderland serves Dalton Park and takes just over an hour from Durham Bus Station or 25 minutes from Sunderland Bus Station.

=== Rail ===
Seaham railway station is located near by with frequent train services operated by Northern Trains. Bus services from the train station to Dalton Park take around 25 minutes.
