= Eden Vale =

Hamlet in County Durham, England

Coordinates: 54.729°N 1.338°W

- Location within County Durham
- OS grid reference: NZ427373
- Unitary authority: County Durham
- Ceremonial county: County Durham
- Region: North East
- Country: England
- Sovereign state: United Kingdom
- Post town: TEESSIDE
- Postcode district: TS27
- Police: Durham
- Fire: County Durham and Darlington
- Ambulance: North East

Eden Vale is a hamlet in County Durham, in England. It is a few miles to the south of Peterlee.
