= North Kilvington =

Hamlet and civil parish in North Yorkshire, England

Coordinates: 54.263740°N 1.349770°W

- Location within North Yorkshire
- Population: 30
- OS grid reference: SE424855
- Civil parish: North Kilvington
- Unitary authority: North Yorkshire
- Ceremonial county: North Yorkshire
- Region: Yorkshire and the Humber
- Country: England
- Sovereign state: United Kingdom
- Post town: THIRSK
- Postcode district: YO7
- Police: North Yorkshire
- Fire: North Yorkshire
- Ambulance: Yorkshire

North Kilvington is a hamlet and civil parish in North Yorkshire, England. It is situated just off the A19, about two miles north of Thirsk. In the 2001 census, North Kilvington had a population of 23. The population of the civil parish was estimated at 30 in 2014.

From 1974 to 2023 it was part of the Hambleton District, it is now administered by the unitary North Yorkshire Council.

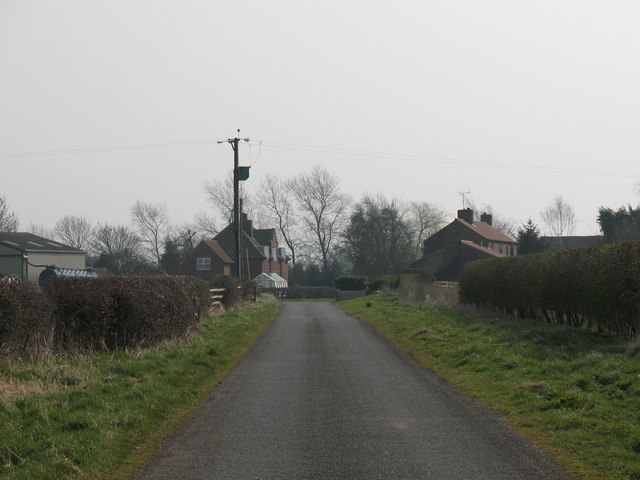
Looking south along Moorhouse Lane into North Kilvington
