= Eggborough power station =

Former coal-fired power station in North Yorkshire, England

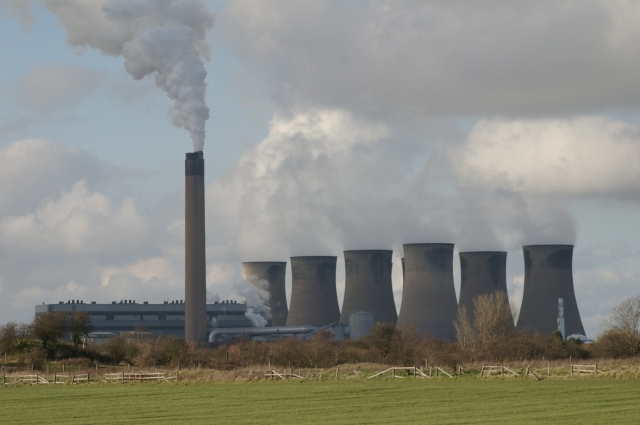
- Eggborough Power Station; Viewed from the south in February 2007
- Country: England
- Location: Knottingley
- Coordinates: 53.7116°N 1.1269°W
- Status: Decommissioned and Demolished
- Construction began: 1962
- Commission date: 1967–70
- Decommission date: 2018
- Owner: St Francis Group
- Operators: Central Electricity Generating Board (1967—1990); National Power (1990—2000); British Energy (2000—2010); Eggborough Power Ltd. (2010—2018)

Thermal power station
- Primary fuel: Coal
- Secondary fuel: Fuel oil (gas turbines)
- Site area: 400 acres (162 ha)
- Cooling towers: 8

Power generation
- Units operational: 4 × 500 MW
- Nameplate capacity: 1,960 MW

External links
- Website: www.eggboroughpower.co.uk
- Commons: Related media on Commons

Eggborough power station was a coal-fired power station in North Yorkshire, England, which was capable of co-firing biomass. It was situated on the River Aire, between the towns of Knottingley and Snaith, deriving its name from the nearby village of Eggborough. The station had a generating capacity of 1,960 megawatts, enough electricity to power 2 million homes, equivalent to the area of Leeds and Sheffield.

The station, one of the Hinton Heavies, began generating power in 1967, making use of nearby coal reserves. It was built for, and initially operated by the Central Electricity Generating Board. The station closed in September 2018 and demolition works began in 2020, with the eight cooling towers being the first to come down in 2021. The Bunker Bay was demolished on 6 March 2022, the DA Bay on 1 June 2022 and the chimney and boiler house on 24 July 2022. There are plans to replace it with a 2,500 megawatt gas power plant.

== History ==
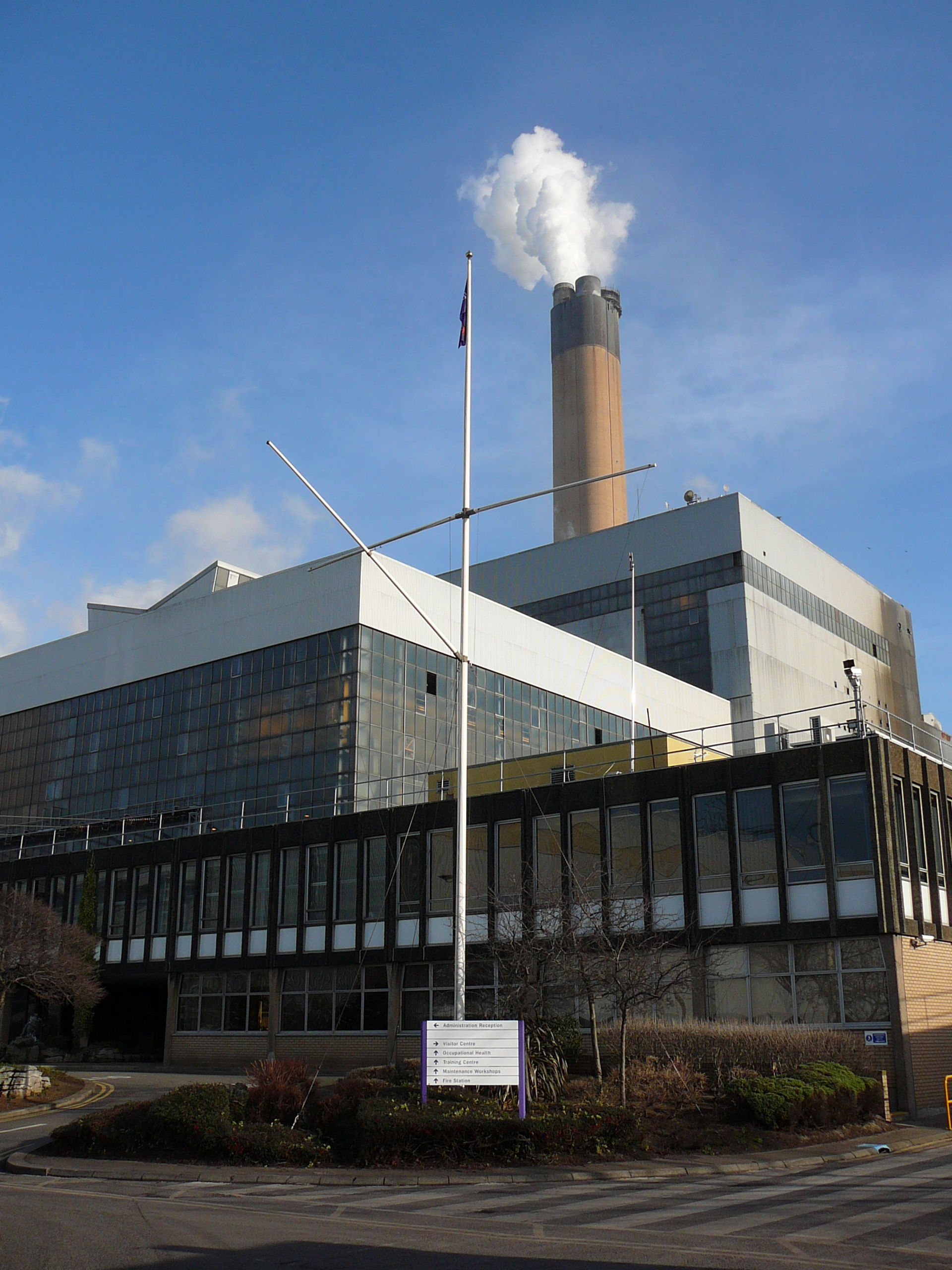
Eggborough Power Station

=== Construction ===
Eggborough power station was first proposed alongside Ferrybridge "C" power station in April 1961. Construction was authorised in early 1962, which included the demolition of Sherwood Hall. The architect was George Hooper of Sir Percy Thomas & Son. Large expanses of aluminium cladding and dark glazing were intended to give 'a cool and defining architectural expression that subtly contrasted with the warm concrete towers and the black-capped chimney'. Construction of the station was completed in 1967.

The station was designed to accommodate four 500 megawatt (MW) coal-fired pulverised fuel units, giving the station a total electrical output of 1,960 MW. The first of these units were connected to the national grid in February 1967. Units 2, 3 and 4 had all been commissioned by 1970.

The station was officially opened by Brigadier Kenneth Hargreaves on 18 September 1970, once all units had been commissioned.

=== Specification ===
There were four boilers rated at 550 kg/s. Steam conditions were 158.58 bar at 568/568 °C reheat. Units 3 and 4 had flue-gas desulphurisation equipment installed, which reduced the units' emissions of sulphur dioxide by around 90%.

There were 4 × 17.5 MW auxiliary black start Bristol Siddeley gas turbines on the site: these were first commissioned in May 1967. Two of these, Units 5 & 8, were decommissioned in 1993.

Eggborough power station was supplied with fuel via a 1½ mile branch line off the Wakefield and Goole Line. Rail facilities included a west-facing junction on the Goole line, two coal discharge lines (No. 1 and No. 2), gross- and tare-weight weighbridges, a hopper house, a limestone unloading line and an oil discharge line.

The eight 90 metre (300 ft) high cooling towers were arranged in two rows of four located to the north of the main power station building. There was a single 200 m (660 ft) tall chimney located east of the main building. This was constructed in 1966. The electrical switching station was located to the south of the main building.

In 2005, a retrofit turbine upgrade was carried out to increase the station's efficiency and flexibility by improving part-load and two-shift operation.

In 2007 the station employed around 300 people, as well as contractors.

=== Ash disposal ===
Alongside the Ferrybridge power stations, Eggborough used to pump ash from the incineration process to a piece of land south of the railway line, the M62 motorway and the Aire and Calder Navigation called Gale Common Ash Disposal. The area covered 0.58 square miles (1.5 km^{2}) and was landscaped by Brenda Colvin into a hill with contours (she was said to have been inspired by Maiden Castle hillfort in Dorset). The hill reaches a height of 160 feet (50 m) and stands out amongst the rather flat landscape of this part of North Yorkshire.

== Ownership ==
The station was built for, and initially operated by, the Central Electricity Generating Board. The station became the property of National Power on privatisation of the industry in 1990.

British Energy bought Eggborough power station, as its only coal-fired power station, in 2000 to provide a more flexible power production facility alongside its nuclear power stations to reduce penalty charge risks from the New Electricity Trading Arrangements introduced in March 2001. The purchase of Eggborough occurred at the peak of the market for power stations, and in 2002 the value of the station was written down by half.

At the beginning of 2009, Électricité de France (EDF) purchased British Energy. In August 2009, it became apparent that the station's lenders had the option to buy the station the following April, to comply with commitments made to the European Commission when agreeing the acquisition of British Energy. On 1 April 2010, EDF transferred Eggborough to the plant's bondholders.

In November 2014, it was announced that the power station was to be acquired by Czech Republic–based Energetický a průmyslový holding. The acquisition was finalised in January 2015.

In June 2019, the property development and investment group St Francis acquired 130 acres of the site for an undisclosed sum. Eggborough Power Limited retained ownership of the former coal stockyard, with plans to construct a new gas-fired power station.

== Closure ==
In September 2015, the owners announced the plant was expected to stop producing electricity by the end of March 2016. However, less than two months before the closure, in February 2016 it was announced that the plant would continue to operate for at least another twelve months through to March 2017. In late 2013, there were plans to convert the station to biomass, however the plans were scrapped after the transition was not identified as "provisionally affordable".

On 1 August, it was announced that a further unit would be available to run commercially from mid September 2016. Units 1 and 2 would generate for National Grid under the Supplementary Balance Reserve contracts, providing 775 MW. Unit 4 returned to commercial operation on 16 September 2016 to generate 440 MW into the wholesale market following six months of deep maintenance.

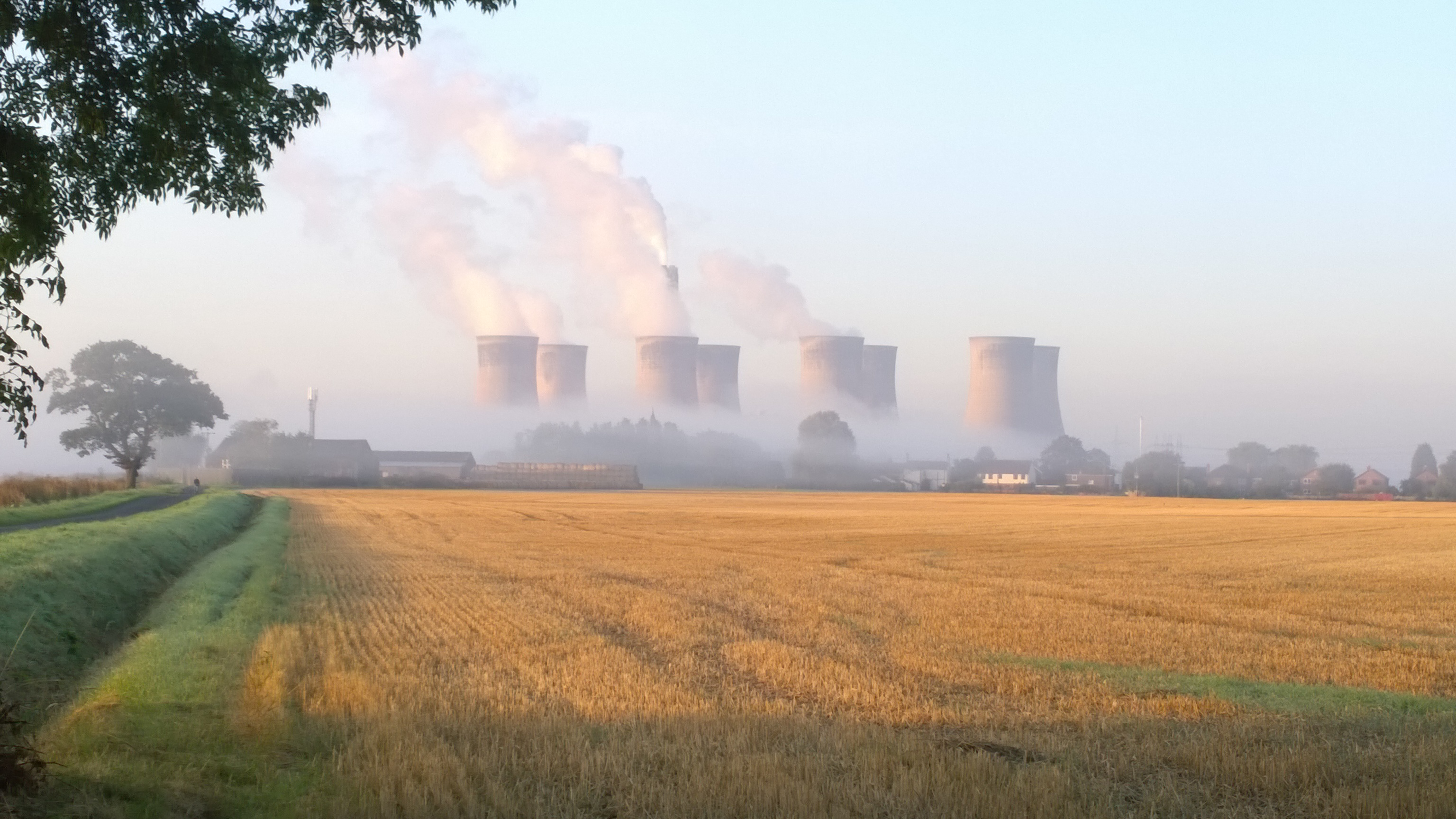
Eggborough power station, September 2016

On 2 February 2018, it was announced that Eggborough would close the following September. Eggborough power station stopped generating and de-synced on 23 March 2018. Generator 4 was the last operational unit and was declared unavailable at 02:00. Eggborough power station was bought by St Francis Group in 2019, with a plan to demolish the power station and build warehouse units in its place.

In July 2021, about one mile of redundant railway track was donated and moved to the Wensleydale Railway.

=== Demolition ===
In late 2019, work began on clearing materials from the coal yard which was followed by asbestos removal and preparation of the towers for demolition.

On 1 August 2021, just after 08:00, four of the eight cooling towers were demolished as part of the redevelopment of the site. On 10 October 2021 at 09:00, the final four cooling towers were demolished.

On 6 March 2022, the coal bunker building known as 'Bunker Bay' was demolished. The demolition was carried out by Birmingham-based contractors DSM. The Turbine Hall was dismantled prior to the DA Bay's demolition that was scheduled in June 2022.

On 1 June 2022, a section of the boiler house known as 'DA Bay' was demolished.

On 24 July 2022, at 10:00, the chimney stack and the main boiler house were demolished. This was the final explosive demolition at the site.

Once demolition works are completed, the former station site is expected to become an industrial site known as 'Core 62'.

== Planned gas-fired station ==
On 26 August 2016, Eggborough Power Limited (EPL) proposed to develop a new gas-fired power station at Eggborough named Eggborough CCGT, on the site of the coal-fired station's coal stockyard. The new power station would be a combined cycle gas turbine (CCGT) plant with a generating capacity of up to 2,500 MW. Outline plans for the new development included building a new gas pipeline to connect the station to the National Transmission System.

Permission for the construction of the new power station was granted by the UK Government in September 2018. As of February 2025, the new station remained unbuilt, and plans for its development were reportedly being 'scaled back'.

== Use in media ==
In late 2018, the decommissioned station was used as a filming location for the Fast and the Furious film, Hobbs & Shaw.

== See also ==
- Energy use and conservation in the United Kingdom
- Energy policy of the United Kingdom
- Aire valley power stations
