= Huby, Hambleton =

Village and civil parish in North Yorkshire, England

Coordinates: 54.082°N 1.135°W

Huby
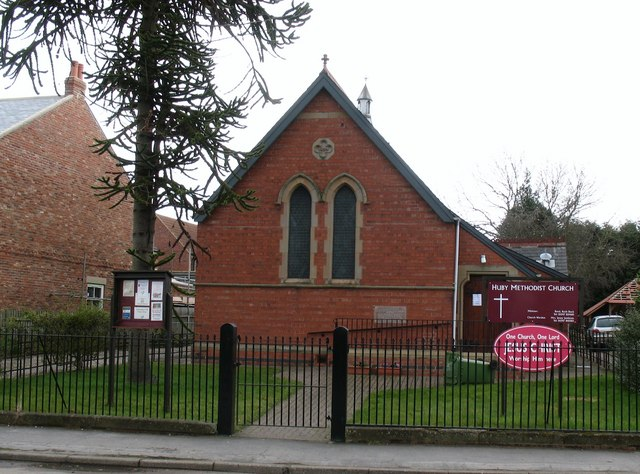

- Location within North Yorkshire
- Population: 1,167 (2011 census)
- OS grid reference: SE567658
- Civil parish: Huby
- Unitary authority: North Yorkshire
- Ceremonial county: North Yorkshire
- Region: Yorkshire and the Humber
- Country: England
- Sovereign state: United Kingdom
- Post town: YORK
- Postcode district: YO61
- Dialling code: 01347
- Police: North Yorkshire
- Fire: North Yorkshire
- Ambulance: Yorkshire
- UK Parliament: Wetherby and Easingwold

Huby is a village and civil parish in the county of North Yorkshire, England, about nine and a half miles north of York and five miles south-east of Easingwold. The village has a small shop, post office, fish and chip shop, a Chinese takeaway, a pub, motel rooms, a Methodist church, a sports ground complete with a pavilion, a B&B motel and a village hall.

== Governance ==
Huby is the largest village in the electoral ward of Huby and Sutton. The population of this ward at the 2011 census was 1,940.

From 1974 to 2023 it was part of the Hambleton District, it is now administered by the unitary North Yorkshire Council.

== See also ==
- Listed buildings in Huby, Hambleton
