= Hedworth =

Hedworth is a masculine given name and a surname. It may refer to:

- Hedworth Jolliffe, 2nd Baron Hylton (1829–1899), British Army officer and Member of Parliament
- Hedworth Lambton (MP) (1797–1876), Member of Parliament for North Durham (1832–1847)
- Hedworth Meux (1856–1929), born Hedworth Lambton, British Royal Navy Admiral of the Fleet
- Sir Hedworth Williamson, 7th Baronet (1797–1861), British politician
- Sir Hedworth Williamson, 8th Baronet (1827–1900), British politician
- Chris Hedworth (born 1964), English retired footballer
- Henry Hedworth (1626–1705), English Unitarian writer
