= Holystone, Tyne and Wear =

Coordinates: 55.025003°N 1.5286435°W

Holystone
- Location within Tyne and Wear
- OS grid reference: NZ302701
- Metropolitan borough: North Tyneside
- Metropolitan county: Tyne and Wear
- Region: North East
- Country: England
- Sovereign state: United Kingdom
- Post town: NEWCASTLE UPON TYNE
- Postcode district: NE27
- Dialling code: 0191
- Police: Northumbria
- Fire: Tyne and Wear
- Ambulance: North East
- UK Parliament: Cramlington and Killingworth

Holystone is a village in North Tyneside, Tyne and Wear, England. It is situated to the southwest of Whitley Bay, just off the A19.

There is one school located within the village, Holystone Primary School.

There is also a hotel operated by Premier Inn.
