= Patrick Kilvington =

Patrick Kilvington (11 December 1922 – 14 October 1990) was a British-born Australian artist.

== Information ==
In 1922, Patrick Kilvington was born in the United Kingdom, and he came to Australia in 1950. He is known to be an Impressionist painter who specialized in oil painting and he concentrates mostly on rural and genre subjects. He attended various rodeos and country events where he studied, and he sketched and photographed the activities he was at. He was known as a badly behaved young man and he reflects this in many of his subjects. Kilvington's realism is depicted in his paintings, and it came from his familiarity with his subject matter. He became a full-time painter in 1971.

== Awards and honors ==
Patrick Kilvington received the following awards and honors:

- the Royal National Repatriation Prize, Canberra in 1971
- the Royal Brisbane Show in 1980
- S.G.I.O., Brisbane in 1979

He was knighted by the Hutt River Principality, an award that carries no title. He later claimed a hereditary title that had gone into abeyance.
