= Whitley Bridge railway station =

Railway station in North Yorkshire, England

Whitley Bridge
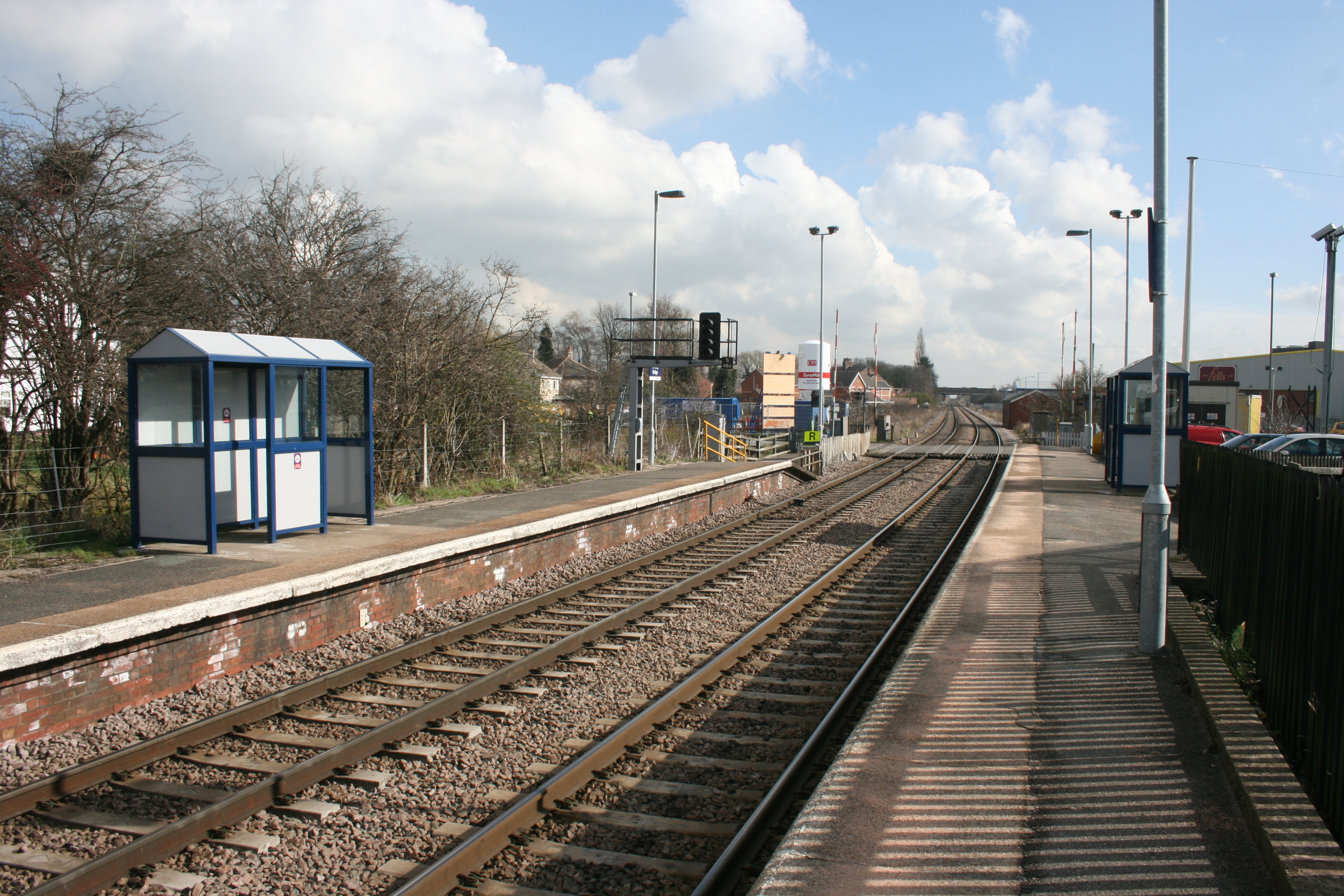

General information
- Location: Eggborough, North Yorkshire; England
- Coordinates: 53.699100°N 1.158900°W
- Grid reference: SE556228
- Manager: Northern Trains
- Platforms: 2

Other information
- Station code: WBD
- Classification: DfT category F2

History
- Opened: 1 April 1848

Passengers
- 2021/22: ▲462
- 2022/23: ▲906
- 2023/24: ▲1,202
- 2024/25: ▼860
- 2025/26: ▲1,348
Location
Notes
- Passenger statistics from the Office of Rail and Road

Whitley Bridge railway station serves the villages of Eggborough and Whitley in North Yorkshire, England. It is located on the Pontefract Line and is 20 miles (32 km) east of Leeds. It was opened by the Lancashire and Yorkshire Railway on 1 April 1848, on their line between Wakefield Kirkgate and Goole via Knottingley.

== Facilities ==
The station is unstaffed and has only basic amenities – no permanent buildings remain other than standard glass and metal shelters on each platform. There is a single customer help point on platform 1 (eastbound) and timetable posters on both sides to provide train running information. No ticket facilities are provided, so passengers can buy their tickets either on the train or at their destination. Step-free access is available to both platforms via the level crossing at the Goole end of the station.

== Services ==
Whitley Bridge has a limited service – Monday to Saturdays, one (early evening) train a day goes to Goole and two per day go to Leeds (one in the morning business peak and the other mid-evening). There is no Sunday service. Trains operate on Bank holidays.

The sparse timetable continues to operate mainly to meet Northern's franchise obligations and to avoid the need for the Knottingley to Goole line to be put through the formal closure process. The line is however also used for freight traffic to/from Drax Power Station.

Preceding station	National Rail	Following station
Knottingley	Northern Trains Pontefract Line Mondays-Saturdays only	Hensall
