= Saltholme =

Nature reserve in County Durham, England

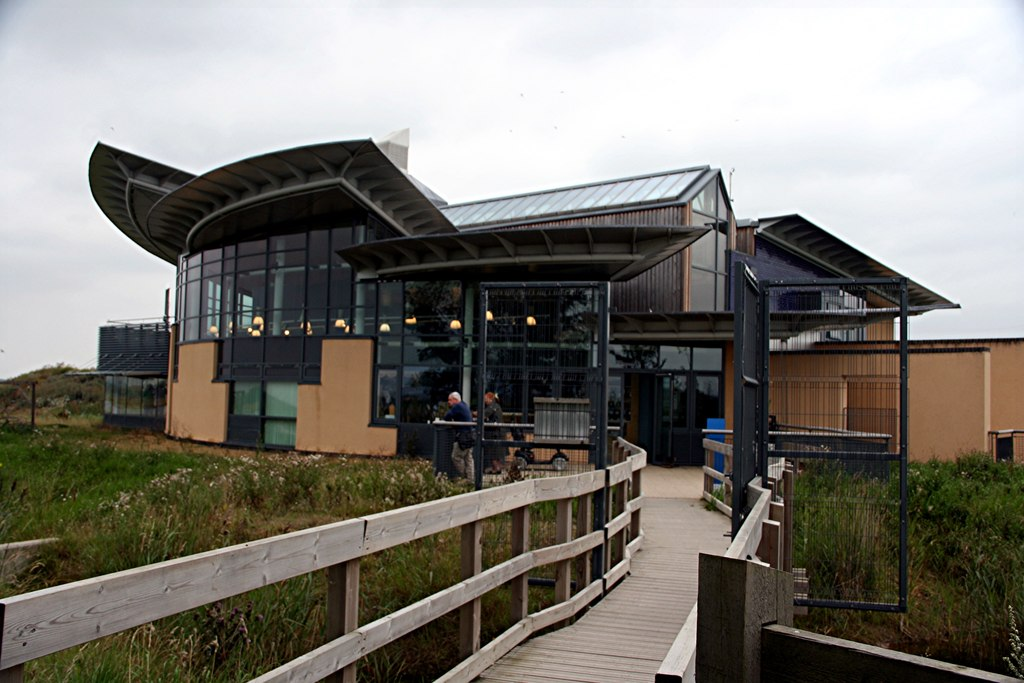

RSPB Saltholme is a nature reserve located on the estuary of the River Tees between Haverton Hill and Seal Sands in County Durham, England. It was opened in March 2009. Situated across 1,000 acres, is the largest bird sanctuary operated by the Royal Society for the Protection of Birds. The land is owned by the Teesside Environment Trust. Water rails, reed buntings, reed warblers and common terns are among the birds observable there.

== History ==
Saltholme was originally salt marsh. It was reclaimed as agricultural land. Salt was mined on the site from the 1820s. Bell Brothers of Middlesbrough used boreholes to mine salt from 1882. ICI donated the land to the Teesside Environment Trust in the early 1990s.
