= Murton, County Durham =

Village in County Durham, England

Murton
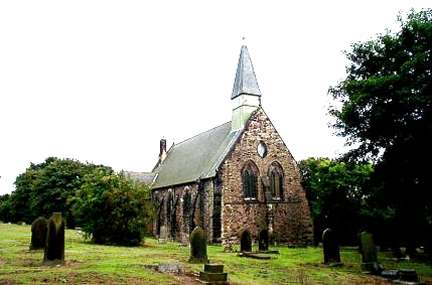
- Holy Trinity Church

- Location within County Durham
- Population: 4,534 (2011 Census)
- OS grid reference: NZ323702
- Civil parish: Murton
- Unitary authority: County Durham
- Ceremonial county: Durham
- Region: North East
- Country: England
- Sovereign state: United Kingdom
- Post town: SEAHAM
- Postcode district: SR7
- Dialling code: 0191
- Police: Durham
- Fire: County Durham and Darlington
- Ambulance: North East
- UK Parliament: Easington

Murton is a village and civil parish in County Durham, England, eight miles (13 km) east of the city of Durham and six miles (9.7 km) south of Sunderland. It had a population of 4,534, which rose to 7,676 at the 2011 Census.

It was originally a rural agricultural hamlet called Morton, but the discovery of coal beneath its fields in the 19th century transformed it into an industrial community. 'Morton became known as Murton Colliery or Murton-in-the-Whins following the sinking of the pit in 1838 by South Hetton Coal Company, and the village was a productive coal mining community for more than a century. The pit employed more than 1000 men at its peak and featured in a Picture Post article showing the 'vesting' of the mine at nationalisation in 1947.

The village had the South East Durham Cooperative Bakery and a Northern Bus Company garage as added sources of jobs. In 1955 a by-product works for coal was established for the production mainly of coke. The mine and other employment opportunities closed in the 1990s along with many other County Durham mines and since 2003 the old spoil heaps are covered by retail outlet development Dalton Park, bringing much-needed new employment.

== History ==
The discovery of coal beneath the fields of East Durham in the 19th century transformed the small agricultural hamlet of Morton into the mining township of Murton. The colliery operated from 1843 until its closure in November 1991. Subsequent public and private investment has supported regeneration projects in the former mining village, including the development of the Dalton Park retail outlet on the site of the old spoil heaps.

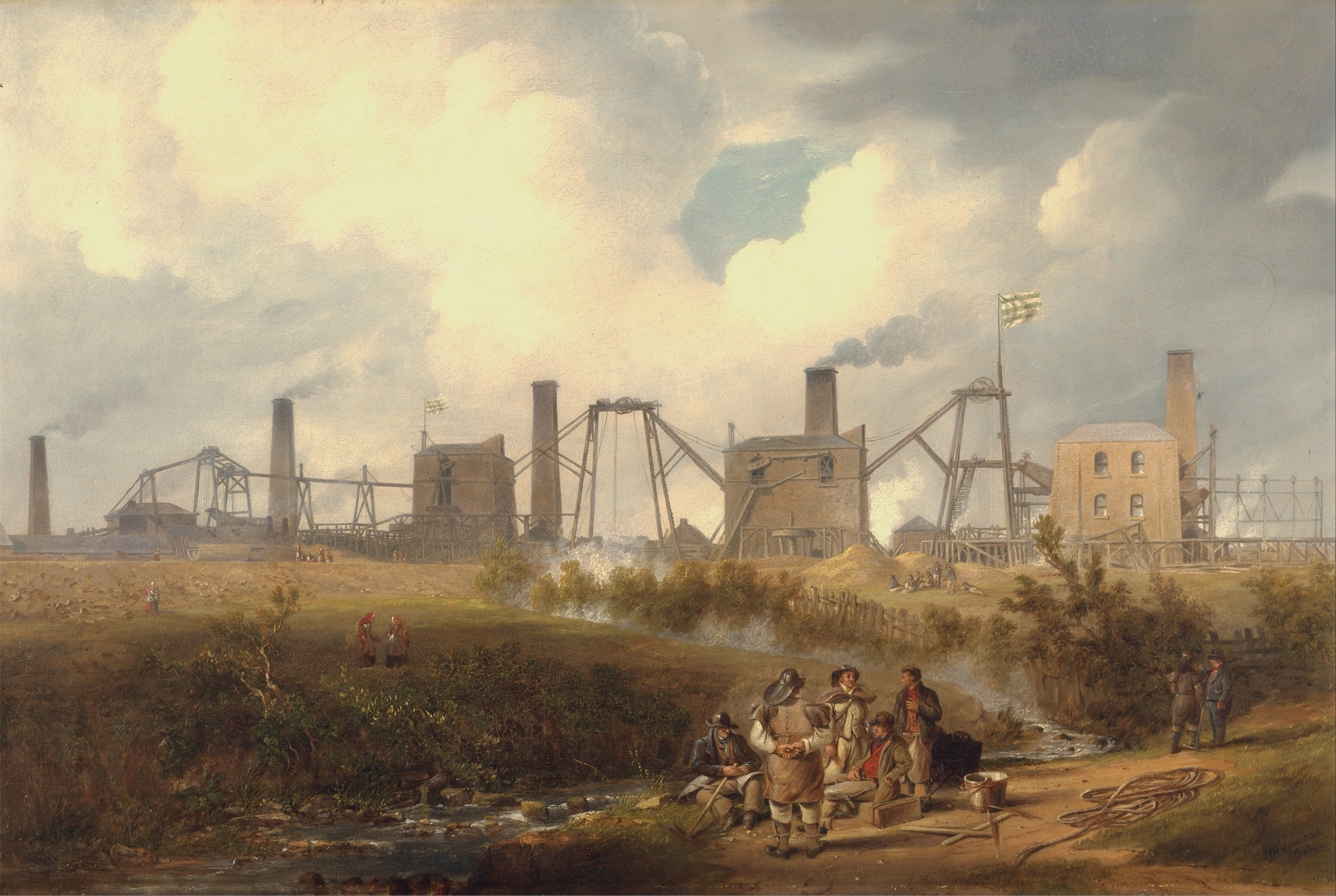
John Wilson Carmichael A View of Murton Colliery near Seaham, County Durham, 1843

Fewer than 100 people lived in the village of Murton before 1830 but following the sinking of the mine in 1838 the population had grown to 1,387 by 1851. Miners flocked to Murton from across County Durham and Northumberland in the early years, with people later uprooting from Devon, Cornwall and Ireland too. Many of the road and place names reflected the original roots of these pitmen, such as the Cornwall estate, and dozens of different accents could be heard in the streets.

Work on the colliery – one of the pioneering mines of the East Durham coalfield — began on 19 February 1838 but it was five years before the first coals were drawn. Problems with pockets of shifting sand and the depth of the magnesian limestone overlying the coal delayed the work, making the project hugely expensive. Late shifts were even introduced for the first time, so that excavation could be carried out around the clock to finish the three-shafted pit as quickly as possible.

Just five years after the colliery opened, however, there was an explosion on 15 August 1848, near the Polka East shaft, which killed 16 miners. The tragedy left villagers shaken, but the village itself continued to flourish. Indeed, by 1856 Murton was almost unrecognisable from the hamlet it had once been. Scores of terraced houses had been built to house the miners and the village now boasted three pubs and a new school, plus gas and coke works. As prospective miners continued to flood in so the number of tradesmen grew, with Murton Colliery Co-operative Society helping to serve the village by 1890.

As the village flourished, so too did the colliery. It was modernised after World War I and in 1922 a Koepe friction winding engine was installed in the West Pit. New pithead baths followed in 1939, described as being "of especially pleasant design”, and Murton's swimming pool was opened in 1961.

Despite high productivity and a loyal workforce the decision was taken to close the pit in 1991. Campaigners fought against the plans but failed to stop them. The Koepe winding engine was transferred to the Bowes Railway following the controversial closure and in 1994 the colliery's winding tower was demolished.

=== Timeline ===
- 1830: Population 69
- 1838: Work on pit starts
- 1843: First coals drawn
- 1851: Population 1,395
- 1889: Electricity first used in pit
- 1892: Murton toll gates removed
- 1902: Three putters killed in pit, two aged 14, one aged 18
- 1906: Colliery draws 4,131 tons of coal in one day
- 1910: Miners strike over Eight Hours Bill
- 1913: Foundation stone laid for first council house
- 1914: First public telephone for Murton, based in post office
- 1922: Cenotaph unveiled
- 1923: Coal drawn from West Pit for first time
- 1927: Bus service to Sunderland introduced by Northern buses
- 1930: First talking pictures at Murton Empire
- 1931: Flush toilets installed in colliery houses
- 1935: Miners started carrying electric lamps
- 1939: Pit-head baths opened
- 1950: X-ray van visited Murton for the first time
- 1953: The first paid annual holiday leave of two weeks was introduced
- 1957: A new library was opened in Barnes Road
- 1958: Murton Brickworks closed
- 1961: Murton's swimming pool was opened
- 1982: First memorial service held to commemorate fatalities at Murton pit
- 1990: Miners fought to keep the pit open
- 1991: Murton Colliery closed
- 1994: Pit winding tower demolished despite being listed
- 2003: Dalton Park opening date
- 2023: One of the filming locations for the film directed by Ken Loach The Old Oak about a previously thriving mining community

== Old village streets and their nicknames ==
- Owen Street: Sandgate Rar
- Lancaster Street: Double Rar
- Green Street: Smokey Rar
- Railway Street: Red Tiled Rar
- Villiers Street: Wood Rar
- Durham Place: Sinkers Rar
- Dalton Terrace: Pot Pie Rar
- South Street: Plantation Rar
- East Street: Cinder Burners Rar
- Shipperdon Street: Ower the Field
- Murton Street: Cross Rar
- Old Pilgrim Street: Boiler Rar
- New Pilgrim Street: Low Rar
- Pilgrim Street: High Rar
- Model Street: Wagon Rar

== Governance ==
An electoral ward of the same name exists. It includes Dalton-le-Dale and surrounding areas and had a total population at the 2011 Census of 7,975.

== Economy ==
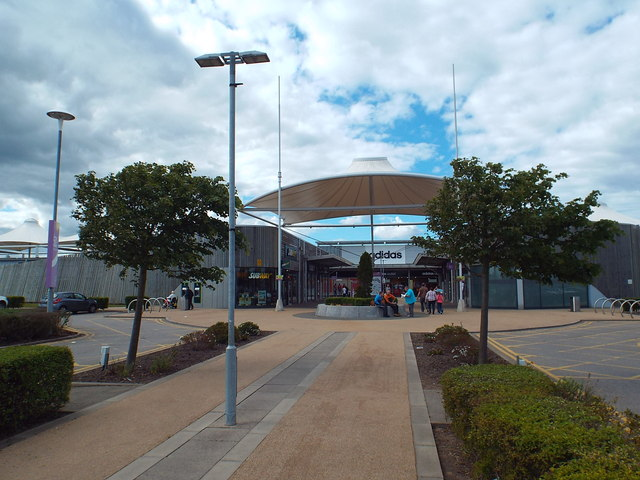
Dalton Park

The village had the South East Durham Cooperative Bakery and a Northern Bus Company garage as added sources of jobs. In 1955 a by-product works for coal was established for the production mainly of coke. The mine and other employment opportunities closed in the 1990s along with many other County Durham mines and since 2003 the old spoil heaps are covered by retail outlet development Dalton Park.

This is a chart of the trend of regional gross value added of County Durham at current basic prices published (pp. 240–253) by the Office for National Statistics, with figures in millions of Pounds Sterling.

Year	Regional Gross Value Added	Agriculture	Industry	Services
1995	4,063	47	1,755	2,261
2000	4,783	40	1,840	2,904
2003	5,314	39	1,978	3,297

== Climate ==
Murton

Climate chart (precipitation, max. and min. temperature)
J	F	M	A	M	J	J	A	S	O	N	D
56 6 1	39 7 1	51 9 2	52 11 3	50 15 6	55 17 9	45 20 11	61 20 11	58 17 9	57 13 6	62 9 3	59 7 2
- █ Average max. and min. temperatures in °C
- █ Precipitation totals in mm
Imperial conversion
J	F	M	A	M	J	J	A	S	O	N	D
2.2 43 33	1.5 44 33	2 48 36	2 52 38	1.9 58 42	2.2 63 47	1.8 68 51	2.4 67 51	2.3 62 47	2.2 55 43	2.4 48 38	2.3 45 35
- █ Average max. and min. temperatures in °F
- █ Precipitation totals in inches

Like the rest of the United Kingdom, Murton has a temperate climate. At 643.3 millimetres (25 in) the average annual rainfall is lower than the national average of 1,125 millimetres (44 in). Equally there are only around 121.3 days where more than 1 millimetre (0.04 in) of rain falls compared with a national average of 154.4 days. The area sees on average 1374.6 hours of sunshine per year, compared with a national average of 1125.0 hours. There is frost on 52 days compared with a national average of 55.6 days. Average daily maximum and minimum temperatures are 12.5 and 5.2 °C (54.5 and 41.4 °F) compared with a national averages of 12.1 and 5.1 °C (53.8 and 41.2 °F) respectively.

The table below gives the average temperature and rainfall figures taken between 1991 and 2020 at the Met Office weather station in Durham:

Climate data for Durham Coordinates 54°46′04″N 1°35′04″W; elevation: 102 m (335 ft) 1991–2020 normals, extremes 1843–2023
Month	Jan	Feb	Mar	Apr	May	Jun	Jul	Aug	Sep	Oct	Nov	Dec	Year
Record high °C (°F)	16.3 (61.3)	17.4 (63.3)	21.8 (71.2)	24.1 (75.4)	29.7 (85.5)	30.7 (87.3)	36.9 (98.4)	32.5 (90.5)	30.0 (86.0)	25.3 (77.5)	19.3 (66.7)	15.9 (60.6)	36.9 (98.4)
Mean daily maximum °C (°F)	6.9 (44.4)	7.8 (46.0)	9.9 (49.8)	12.5 (54.5)	15.4 (59.7)	18.0 (64.4)	20.2 (68.4)	19.9 (67.8)	17.4 (63.3)	13.5 (56.3)	9.7 (49.5)	7.1 (44.8)	13.2 (55.8)
Daily mean °C (°F)	4.1 (39.4)	4.6 (40.3)	6.2 (43.2)	8.3 (46.9)	10.9 (51.6)	13.6 (56.5)	15.8 (60.4)	15.6 (60.1)	13.3 (55.9)	10.0 (50.0)	6.6 (43.9)	4.2 (39.6)	9.5 (49.1)
Mean daily minimum °C (°F)	1.3 (34.3)	1.4 (34.5)	2.5 (36.5)	4.1 (39.4)	6.5 (43.7)	9.3 (48.7)	11.3 (52.3)	11.3 (52.3)	9.2 (48.6)	6.5 (43.7)	3.6 (38.5)	1.4 (34.5)	5.7 (42.3)
Record low °C (°F)	−16.9 (1.6)	−18.0 (−0.4)	−15.0 (5.0)	−11.1 (12.0)	−4.8 (23.4)	−0.8 (30.6)	1.4 (34.5)	0.0 (32.0)	−1.7 (28.9)	−5.3 (22.5)	−12.0 (10.4)	−16.4 (2.5)	−18.0 (−0.4)
Average precipitation mm (inches)	51.8 (2.04)	44.6 (1.76)	41.1 (1.62)	51.2 (2.02)	44.4 (1.75)	61.0 (2.40)	60.9 (2.40)	66.5 (2.62)	56.9 (2.24)	63.4 (2.50)	73.0 (2.87)	61.0 (2.40)	675.7 (26.60)
Average precipitation days (≥ 1.0 mm)	11.8	9.9	8.6	9.1	8.6	9.9	10.7	10.3	9.4	11.8	12.0	12.0	124.1
Mean monthly sunshine hours	60.9	84.4	121.7	160.8	187.1	167.1	174.3	167.3	135.3	98.9	64.6	57.6	1,480
Source 1: Met Office
Source 2: Durham Weather

== Notable residents ==
- Mary Ann Cotton (1832–1873), convicted murderer executed for poisoning her stepson, grew up in Murton.
- Paul Kitson, professional footballer who played in the Premier League for Newcastle United and West Ham United.

== See also ==
- Seaham
- Durham Miners' Gala
- Dawdon
- Easington
