= List of Sites of Special Scientific Interest in County Durham =

Protected land in England

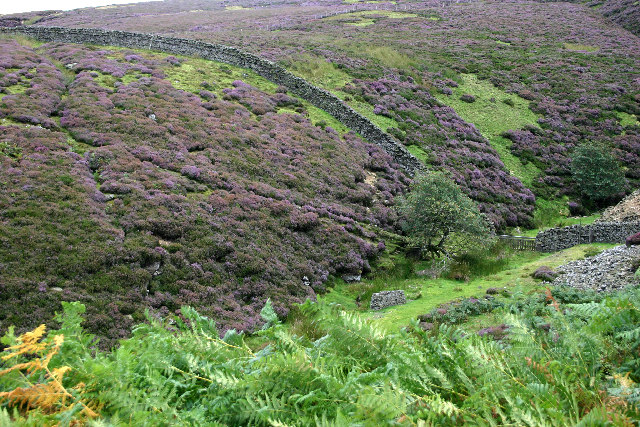
Monk's Moor in Upper Teesdale, the largest SSSI in County Durham

This is a list of the Sites of Special Scientific Interest (SSSIs) in County Durham, England. It excludes SSSIs situated in that area south of the River Tyne that is now part of the metropolitan county of Tyne and Wear as well as the area north of the River Tees which, prior to 1996, formed part of the county of Cleveland.

As of July 2010, County Durham has 88 sites that have been designated as SSSIs, of which 67 have been designated for their biological interest, 16 for their geological interest, and 5 for both.

Five of these sites are shared with an adjacent county:

- Moorhouse and Cross Fell with Cumbria;
- Derwent Gorge and Horsleyhope Ravine, Hexhamshire Moors and Muggleswick, Stanhope and Edmundbyers Commons and Blanchland Moor with Northumberland;
- Durham Coast with both Cleveland (in the south) and Tyne and Wear (in the north).

== Designation of SSSIs ==
Sites of Special Scientific Interest are areas that have been selected for special protection because of their floral, faunal or geological significance. The concept was first given a statutory basis in the National Parks and Access to the Countryside Act 1949, the relevant provisions of which were repeated in the Wildlife and Countryside Act 1981. Under the 1949 Act, responsibility for selecting and notifying SSSIs in England was delegated to the newly created Nature Conservancy, which was replaced in 1973 by the Nature Conservancy Council (NCC). In 1991, the NCC was split up, its responsibilities in England being passed to English Nature which, in turn, was amalgamated into a new body, Natural England, in 2006.

The process for establishing an SSSI is as follows:

- When a site has been identified, Natural England notifies the landowner, the occupier (if different) and the local planning authority (plus relevant government departments and agencies);
- Owners and occupiers are given time to lodge objections or make representations concerning the restrictions imposed on an SSSI;
- The Board of Natural England considers these responses and decides whether to confirm or withdraw the SSSI notification.

The initial notification of a site is accompanied by a citation sheet, which outlines the reasons for the notification: the data in the following list is summarised from these individual citation sheets.

== Reasons for notification as SSSI ==
Of the 88 SSSIs designated in County Durham, 67 have been designated for their biological interest, 16 for their geological interest, and five for both biological and geological interest.

=== Biological ===
While many of the SSSIs designated for biological reasons cover a variety of habitats, most have been designated primarily for one (or more) of a small number of reasons, as detailed in the individual citation sheets:

- Habitats

- Moorland (upland heath and bogs) – Bollihope, Pikestone, Eggleston and Woodland Fells, Bowes Moor, Cotherstone Moor, Hexhamshire Moors, Lune Forest, Moorhouse and Cross Fell, Muggleswick, Stanhope and Edmundbyers Commons and Blanchland Moor, Upper Teesdale
- Lowland heath – Green Croft and Langley Moor, Hesledon Moor West, Waldridge Fell
- Wetlands (carr, fen, etc) – Burnhope Burn, Butterby Oxbow, Causey Bank Mires, Frog Wood Bog, Hell Kettles, Hesledon Moor East, Hesledon Moor West, Hisehope Burn Valley, Hulam Fen, Middleton Quarry, Pike Whin Bog, Pow Hill Bog, Railway Stell West, Redcar Field, The Carrs, Waldridge Fell, Witton-le-Wear
- Semi-natural woodland – Backstone Bank and Baal Hill Woods, Baldersdale Woodlands, Brignall Banks, Castle Eden Dene, Derwent Gorge and Horsleyhope Ravine, Hawthorn Dene, Hisehope Burn Valley, Hunder Beck Juniper, Shipley and Great Woods, Slit Woods, Westernhope Burn Wood
- Magnesian limestone grassland – Bishop Middleham Quarry, Cassop Vale, Charity Land, Dabble Bank, Durham Coast, Fishburn Grassland, Hawthorn Dene, Hesledon Moor East, Pig Hill, Pittington Hill, Quarrington Hill Grasslands, Raisby Hill Grassland, Sherburn Hill, The Bottoms, Thrislington Plantation, Town Kelloe Bank, Trimdon Limestone Quarry, Tuthill Quarry, Wingate Quarry
- Hay meadows – Bowlees and Friar House Meadows, Cornriggs Meadows, Far High House Meadows, Grains o' th' Beck Meadows, Hannah's Meadows, Low Redford Meadows, Mere Beck Meadows, Middle Crossthwaite, Middle Side and Stonygill Meadows, Newton Ketton Meadow, Rigg Farm and Stake Hill Meadows, West Newlandside Meadows, West Park Meadows
- Open water – Brasside Pond, The Carrs, Witton-le-Wear

- Fauna

- Breeding birds – Bollihope, Pikestone, Eggleston and Woodland Fells, Bowes Moor, Cotherstone Moor, Durham Coast, Hexhamshire Moors, Lune Forest, Moorhouse and Cross Fell, Muggleswick, Stanhope and Edmundbyers Commons and Blanchland Moor, Teesdale Allotments, Upper Teesdale
- Invertebrates – Bishop Middleham Quarry, Cassop Vale, Durham Coast, Green Croft and Langley Moor, Hexhamshire Moors, Middleton Quarry, Moorhouse and Cross Fell, Pig Hill, Quarrington Hill Grasslands, Raisby Hill Grassland, Sherburn Hill, Thrislington Plantation, Town Kelloe Bank, Upper Teesdale, Waldridge Fell

=== Geological ===
The surface geology of County Durham is largely confined to rocks dating from the Carboniferous and Permian periods. In the west of the county, outcrops of Dinantian limestones are found in the river valleys, while the upland areas are underlain by the younger Namurian Millstone Grit Series. To the east, these rocks dip beneath the Westphalian Coal Measures, which underlay a broad swathe in the centre of the county. Further east, the Coal Measures are overlain by Permian Magnesian Limestone, which forms a low plateau across the eastern part of the county. Igneous intrusions are a prominent feature of the geology and gave rise to extensive mining for lead and other minerals, especially in the upper Weardale area in the west of the county.

Although each SSSI designated for geological reasons has its own distinctive features, they fall into a small number of broad categories, as indicated in the individual citation sheets:

- Stratigraphy

- Sedimentary – Botany Hill, Crag Gill, Crime Rigg, Durham Coast, Hawthorn Quarry, Raisby Hill Quarry, Rogerley Quarry, Sleightholme Beck Gorge – The Troughs, Stony Cut, Cold Hesledon, Trimdon Limestone Quarry, Yoden Village Quarry
- Igneous – Greenfoot Quarry, Moorhouse and Cross Fell, Upper Teesdale, West Rigg Open Cutting

- Mineralogy – Close House Mine, Foster's Hush, Moorhouse and Cross Fell, Old Moss Lead Vein, Upper Teesdale, West Rigg Open Cutting
- Palaeontology – Middridge Quarry
- Quaternary events – Durham Coast, Upper Teesdale
- Geomorphology

- Cave development – Fairy Holes Cave, God's Bridge, Moorhouse and Cross Fell
- Coastal – Durham Coast
- Periglacial – Moorhouse and Cross Fell
- Fluvial – Moorhouse and Cross Fell

== Area covered ==
From its inception, English Nature classified sites using the 1974–1996 county system. As Natural England uses the same system, it is also adopted in the following list. As a result, some sites that lie within the ceremonial county of Durham and might therefore be expected to be listed here will be found instead in either the Cleveland or the Tyne and Wear lists.

For other counties, see List of SSSIs by Area of Search.

== Sites ==
Site name	Reason for designation		Area^{[A]}		Grid reference^{[B]}	Year in which notified	Map^{[C]}
Site name	Biological interest	Geological interest	Hectares	Acres	Grid reference^{[B]}	Year in which notified	Map^{[C]}
Backstone Bank and Baal Hill Woods	✓		46.5	114.9	NZ068399	1987	Map
Baldersdale Woodlands	✓		19.6	48.4	NY992200	1991	Map
Bishop Middleham Quarry	✓		8.6	21.3	NZ332326	1968	Map
Bollihope, Pikestone, Eggleston and Woodland Fells	✓		7,949.2	19,643.2	NZ005300	1996	Map
Botany Hill		✓	3.8	9.3	NY955205	1984	Map
Bowes Moor	✓		4,457.7	11,014.9	NY923104	1989	Map
Bowlees and Friar House Meadows	✓		5.6	13.9	NY898283; NY902282	1991	Map
Brasside Pond	✓		25.1	62.0	NZ292452	1966	Map
Brignall Banks	✓		85.0	210.0	NZ063113	1987	Map
Burnhope Burn	✓		5.1	12.6	NZ029507	1987	Map
Butterby Oxbow	✓		7.3	18.0	NZ275390	1957	Map
Cassop Vale	✓		40.9	101.0	NZ335387	1958	Map
Castle Eden Dene	✓		193.0	476.8	NZ434396	1984	Map
Causey Bank Mires	✓		6.8	16.8	NZ206564	1987	Map
Charity Land	✓		5.8	14.4	NZ375345	1999	Map
Close House Mine		✓	3.4	8.3	NY849228	1995	Map
Cornriggs Meadows	✓		15.2	37.5	NY846416	1989	Map
Cotherstone Moor	✓		2,449.5	6,050.1	NY940170	1955	Map
Crag Gill		✓	2.3	5.7	NZ026235	1984	Map
Crime Rigg and Sherburn Hill Quarries		✓	23.2	57.4	NZ344416	1968	Map
Dabble Bank	✓		4.1	10.2	NZ364434	2002	Map
Derwent Gorge and Horsleyhope Ravine ^{[D]}	✓		49.0; 34.0	121.0; 84.0	NZ052493; NZ063483	1976	Map
Durham Coast ^{[E]}	✓	✓	765.4	1,891.4	NZ381685 – NZ495362	1960	Map
Fairy Holes Cave		✓	208.8	515.9	NY936357	1961	Map
Far High House Meadows	✓		5.5	13.6	NY839383	1990	Map
Fishburn Grassland	✓		1.1	2.8	NZ362328	1992	Map
Foster's Hush		✓	1.3	3.2	NY859204		Map
Frog Wood Bog	✓		3.2	7.9	NZ069303	1989	Map
God's Bridge		✓	9.3	22.9	NY957126	1986	Map
Grains o' th' Beck Meadows	✓		12.3	30.4	NY872209	1989	Map
Green Croft and Langley Moor	✓		6.5; 9.0; 12.2	16.1; 22.2; 30.2	NZ169507; NZ166511; NZ186505	1989	Map
Greenfoot Quarry		✓	0.9	2.2	NY982392	1984	Map
Hannah's Meadows	✓		7.1	17.5	NY935185		Map
Hawthorn Dene	✓		64.1	158.4	NZ435458	1968	Map
Hawthorn Quarry		✓	9.8	24.2	NZ435463	1990	Map
Hell Kettles	✓		3.4	8.4	NZ281109	1976	Map
Hesledon Moor East	✓		6.0	14.8	NZ399466	1998	Map
Hesledon Moor West	✓		7.4	18.2	NZ386453	1984	Map
Hexhamshire Moors ^{[F]}	✓		9,433.9	23,311.7	NY870530	1998	Map
Hisehope Burn Valley	✓		14.9	36.9	NZ041477; NZ047473	1988	Map
Hulam Fen	✓		0.2	0.5	NZ439374	1986	Map
Hunder Beck Juniper	✓		3.5	8.5	NY931178	1994	Map
Kilmond Scar	✓		4.5	11.1	NZ028134	1963	Map
Low Redford Meadows	✓		9.3	22.9	NZ077309; NZ084309	1991	Map
Lune Forest	✓		6,333.4	15,650.3	NY850200	1998	Map
Mere Beck Meadows	✓		6.6	16.3	NY951186	1989	Map
Middle Crossthwaite	✓		24.1	59.5	NY931256	1991	Map
Middle Side and Stonygill Meadows	✓		17.3	42.7	NY933262; NY927264	1991	Map
Middleton Quarry	✓		6.0	14.8	NY948245	1964	Map
Middridge Quarry		✓	1.9	4.7	NZ248252	1979	Map
Moorhouse and Cross Fell ^{[G]}	✓	✓	13,707.0	33,870.0	NY715365	1951 / 1963	Map
Muggleswick, Stanhope and Edmundbyers Commons and Blanchland Moor ^{[H]}	✓		9,118.1	22,531.4	NY990450; NY950520	1997	Map
Neasham Fen	✓		2.5	6.1	NZ331115	1992	Map
Newton Ketton Meadow	✓		1.8	4.5	NZ322207	1989	Map
Old Moss Lead Vein		✓	0.6	1.5	NY820433	1961	Map
Park End Wood	✓		10.3	25.5	NY924260	1964	Map
Pig Hill	✓		12.6	31.2	NZ365444; NZ366445	1992	Map
Pike Whin Bog	✓		1.3	3.1	NZ415334	1984	Map
Pittington Hill	✓		6.4	15.8	NZ321447	1987	Map
Pow Hill Bog	✓		6.7	16.6	NZ009518	1986	Map
Quarrington Hill Grasslands	✓		4.5	11.1	NZ333373; NZ340374; NZ341375	2000	Map
Railway Stell West	✓		4.6	11.4	NZ319270 – NZ313247	1986	Map
Raisby Hill Grassland	✓		15.1	37.4	NZ335354	1984	Map
Raisby Hill Quarry		✓	52.4	129.5	NZ342353	1957	Map
Redcar Field	✓		0.7	1.6	NZ292198	1985	Map
Rigg Farm and Stake Hill Meadows	✓		14.7	36.3	NY933224	1989	Map
Rogerley Quarry		✓	5.6	13.8	NZ015379 – NZ021374	1984	Map
Sherburn Hill	✓		16.7	41.2	NZ329417	1985	Map
Shipley and Great Woods	✓		63.4	156.5	NY966119	1975	Map
Sleightholme Beck Gorge - The Troughs	✓	✓	7.5	18.5	NY966119	1976	Map
Slit Woods	✓		14.1	34.8	NY906390	1976	Map
Stony Cut, Cold Hesledon		✓	0.8	2.1	NZ418473	1996	Map
Teesdale Allotments	✓		1,308.3	3,231.6	NY930290	1994	Map
The Bottoms	✓		2.2	5.2	NZ361381	1999	Map
The Carrs	✓		12.9	31.9	NZ301327	1988	Map
Thrislington Plantation	✓		22.7	56.1	NZ316327	1962	Map
Town Kelloe Bank	✓		6.0	15.0	NZ359373	1976	Map
Trimdon Limestone Quarry	✓	✓	0.8	2.0	NZ362353	1992	Map
Tuthill Quarry	✓		10.7	26.5	NZ388429	1994	Map
Upper Teesdale	✓	✓	14,035.6	34,681.9	NY830320	1951	Map
Waldridge Fell	✓		113.5	280.4	NZ250498	1965	Map
West Newlandside Meadows	✓		12.5	30.8	NY972374	1990	Map
West Park Meadows	✓		6.7	16.6	NY940229	1989	Map
West Rigg Open Cutting		✓	4.8	11.9	NY911391	1989	Map
Westernhope Burn Wood	✓		11.8	29.1	NY935371	1976	Map
Wingate Quarry	✓		23.4	57.7	NZ373375	1984	Map
Witton-le-Wear	✓		36.2	89.4	NZ163313	1966	Map
Yoden Village Quarry		✓	0.4	1.0	NZ436417	1988	Map

== Notes ==
^{A} Data rounded to one decimal place.
^{B} Grid reference is based on the British national grid reference system, also known as OSGB36, and is the system used by the Ordnance Survey. Where an SSSI consists of multiple, non-contiguous sections, each section is assigned its own OS grid reference.
^{C} Link to maps using the Nature on the Map service provided by Natural England.
^{D} Natural England also lists Derwent Gorge and Horsleyhope Ravine under Northumberland.
^{E} Natural England also lists Durham Coast under both Cleveland and Tyne and Wear.
^{F} The grid reference for Hexhamshire Moors places it in Northumberland, not Durham; Natural England lists it under both counties.
^{G} Natural England also lists Moorhouse and Cross Fell under Cumbria.
^{H} Natural England also lists Muggleswick, Stanhope and Edmundbyers Commons and Blanchland Moor under Northumberland.
