= Town Kelloe Bank =

- Location within County Durham
- Location: MAGiC MaP
- Nearest town: Ferryhill; Peterlee
- Coordinates: 54°43′47″N 1°26′36″W
- Area: 6.0 ha (15 acres)
- Established: 1976
- Governing body: Natural England
- Website: Town Kelloe Bank SSSI

Town Kelloe Bank is a Site of Special Scientific Interest in County Durham, England. It is situated to the south of The Bottoms SSSI and just north of the village of Town Kelloe.

The site has an important expanse of primary magnesian limestone grassland, in which the dominant blue moor-grass, Sesleria albicans, is associated with species such as quaking grass, Briza media, glaucous sedge, Carex flacca, and meadow oat-grass, Avenula pratensis.

The site holds the largest known population of bird's-eye primrose, Primula farinosa, in County Durham. Other plants that are largely confined to northern limestone areas include butterwort, Pinguicula vulgaris, maidenhair spleenwort, Asplenium trichomanes, and grass of Parnassus, Parnassia palustris.

The site has a breeding population of the Durham argus butterfly, Aricia artaxerxes salmacis.
