= Cassop Vale =

Protected area in County Durham, England

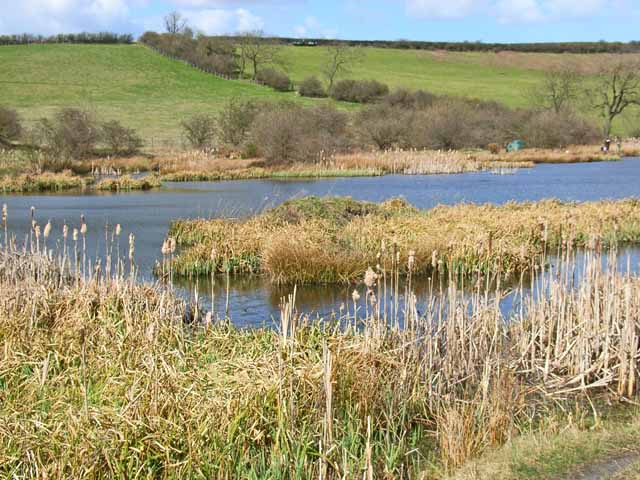
- Cassop Vale

- Location within County Durham
- Location: MAGiC MaP
- Nearest city: Durham
- Coordinates: 54°44′33.4″N 1°28′49.4″W
- Area: 40.9 ha (101 acres)
- Established: 1958
- Governing body: Natural England
- Website: Cassop Vale SSSI

Cassop Vale is a Site of Special Scientific Interest in County Durham, England. It lies between the villages of Bowburn and Cassop, 7 km south-east of the centre of Durham.

The site is important as one of the larger areas of grassland developed on magnesium limestone. This rock has a restricted distribution in England and grassland associated with it is confined almost entirely to south-east Tyneside and County Durham, usually in small, scattered patches that are threatened by quarrying and modern agricultural practices.

Habitats at Cassop Vale include grassland, scrub, woodland and wetland, the last fed by spring-lines. The area also includes recolonised open quarries and mine spoil-heaps, which add to the floral diversity. The main grass species on the magnesian limestone is blue moor-grass Sesleria albicans amongst which grow fragrant orchid Gymnadenia conopsea, cowslip, Primula veris, rock rose Helianthemum nummularium, and quaking grass, Briza media. Several rare and local species are present, including globeflower, Trollius europaeus, birds's-eye primrose, Primula farinosa, lesser club-moss, Selaginella selaginoides, and moonwort, Botrychium lunaria. Elsewhere there is neutral grassland with red fescue and such herbs as cat’s-ear, earthnut and knapweed.

The scrub is dominated by hawthorn, gorse and hazel and on the basic soils grow woodruff, dog's mercury and sanicle. The small flushes on the springline are dominated by rushes and sedges, but are also home to marsh valerian, marsh ragwort, ragged robin and northern marsh-orchid. The wetlands are fringed by common spike-rush, soft rush and greater willow-herb.

The site also supports a diverse invertebrate fauna that includes populations of the Durham argus butterfly, Aricia artaxerxes salmacis, and the least minor moth Photedes captiuncula.
