= Sherburn Hill (SSSI) =

Site of Special Scientific Interest in County Durham, England

- Location within County Durham
- Location: MAGiC MaP
- Nearest city: City of Durham
- Coordinates: 54°46′11″N 1°29′22″W
- Area: 16.7 ha (41 acres)
- Established: 1985
- Governing body: Natural England
- Website: Sherburn Hill SSSI

Sherburn Hill is a Site of Special Scientific Interest in County Durham, England. It lies just south of the road between the villages of Sherburn and Sherburn Hill, some 5.5 km east of Durham city. A disused quarry occupies part of the site.

The site supports an area of semi-natural magnesian limestone grassland, in which blue moor-grass, Sesleria albicans, is the dominant species. Glaucous sedge, Carex flacca, quaking grass, Briza media, meadow oat-grass, Avenula pratensis, rock-rose, Helianthemum nummularium, and fragrant orchid, Gymnadenia conopsea, are common, while sea plantain, Plantago maritima, is locally abundant in the grassland at the edge of limestone spoil heaps.

The site has one of the largest populations of the scarce Durham Argus butterfly, Aricia artaxerxes salmacis, and the rare cistus forester moth, Adscita geryon, has also been recorded.
