= Pig Hill =

Hill in County Durham, England

- Location within County Durham
- Location: MAGiC MaP
- Nearest town: Hetton-le-Hole, Sunderland
- Coordinates: 54°47′38″N 1°25′56″W
- Area: 12.6 ha (31 acres)
- Established: 1992
- Governing body: Natural England
- Website: Pig Hill SSSI

Pig Hill is a Site of Special Scientific Interest in the County Durham district of north-east County Durham, England, situated 1 km (0.62 mi) south of the village of Easington Lane.

The steep hill slopes support an extensive area of primary magnesian limestone grassland in which blue moor-grass, Sesleria albicans, is abundant. The rich assemblage of grassland species includes a number of rare and local species, bird's-eye primrose, Primula farinosa, adder's-tongue fern, Ophioglossum vulgatum, lesser club-moss, Selaginella selaginoides, and grass of Parnassus, Parnassia palustris, as well as an inland colony of sea plantain, Plantago maritima.

Notable among the fauna is the Durham Argus butterfly, Aricia artaxerxes salmacis, a form which is only found in the magnesian limestone areas of Durham.
