= Hawthorn Quarry =

Site of Special Scientific Interest in County Durham, England

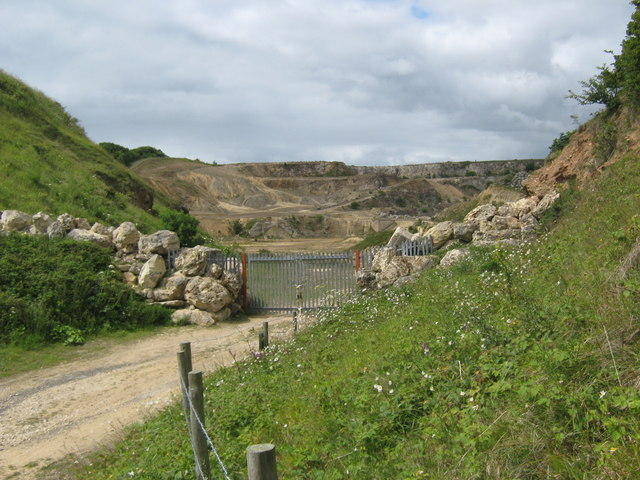

- Location within County Durham
- Location: MAGiC MaP
- Nearest town: Seaham
- Coordinates: 54°48′36″N 1°19′26″W
- Area: 9.8 ha (24 acres)
- Established: 1906
- Governing body: Natural England
- Website: Hawthorn Quarry SSSI

Hawthorn Quarry is a Site of Special Scientific Interest in the Easington district of east County Durham, England. It is a working quarry, currently operated by Tarmac, which is situated just north of the eastern end of Hawthorn Dene SSSI.

The Ford Formation within and adjacent to Hawthorn Quarry is one of only a handful of high purity dolomites within England and the UK as a whole. The minerals are recognised as "resources of national importance" in the County Durham Plan, adopted in 2020 and are safeguarded. The site is considered highly valuable for an understanding of the later evolution of carbonate environments of the Middle Magnesian.

Hawthorn Quarry is located within the defined Hawthorn Beacon/Hill Mineral Consultation Area (MCA), which was first designated in 1981 and is now protected through saved County Durham Minerals Local Plan Policy (MLP) M14. Policy M14 states that development will only be permitted within or adjoining a Mineral Consultation Area including where it would not sterilise significant quantities of potential mineral resources. Paragraph 204 of the NPPF recognises that "planning policies should safeguard mineral resources by defining Mineral Safeguarding Areas; and adopt appropriate policies so that known locations of specific minerals resources of local and national importance and are not sterilised by non-mineral development"
