= Quarrington Hill Grasslands =

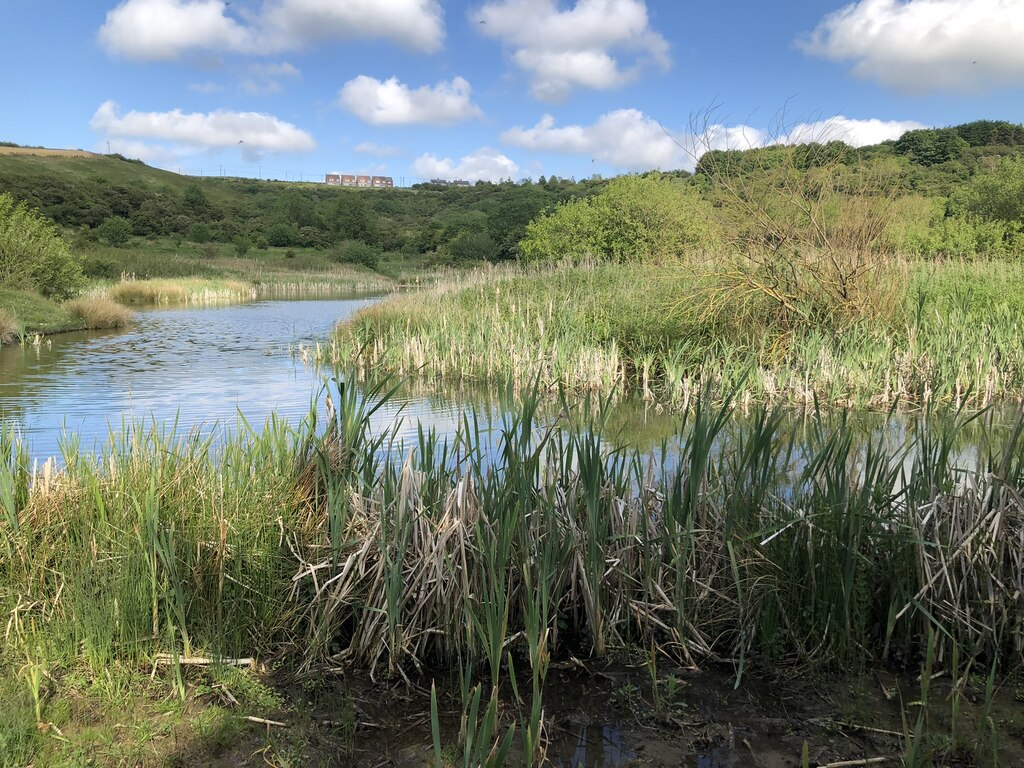
- A pond at the Crowtrees Local Nature Reserve near Quarrington Hill

- Location within County Durham
- Location: MAGiC MaP
- Nearest city: City of Durham
- Coordinates: 54°43′51″N 1°28′40″W
- Area: 4.49 ha (11.1 acres)
- Established: 2000
- Governing body: Natural England
- Website: Quarrington Hill Grasslands SSSI

Quarrington Hill Grasslands is a Site of Special Scientific Interest in County Durham, England. The site consists of three separate areas, two closely adjacent to the east of the village of Quarrington Hill, the third immediately west of the village, which lies 8 km south-east of Durham City.

The area is important for its magnesian limestone grassland communities, which are largely confined to County Durham and increasingly scarce even there. The grasslands at Quarrington Hill are typical of the type, being characterised by the presence of blue moor-grass, Sesleria albicans, and small scabious, Scabiosa columbaria. Less common species include common milkwort, Polygala vulgaris, hairy violet, Viola hirta, and wild carrot, Daucus carota. The nationally scarce dark-red helleborine, Epipactis atrorubens, is found at the site, as is basil thyme, Clinopodium acinos, a southern species that is uncommon this far north.

The Durham Argus butterfly, Aricia artaxerxes salmacis, a form which is only found in the magnesian limestone areas of Durham, is known to breed at the site.

== Land ownership ==
All land within Quarrington Hill Grasslands SSSI is owned by the local authority.
