= Hisehope Burn Valley =

Protected area in County Durham, England

- Location within County Durham
- Location: MAGiC MaP
- Nearest town: Consett
- Coordinates: 54°49′21″N 1°55′56″W
- Area: 14.9 ha (37 acres)
- Established: 1988
- Governing body: Natural England
- Website: Hisehope Burn Valley SSSI

Hisehope Burn Valley is a Site of Special Scientific Interest in the Derwentside district of Durham, England. It consists of two separate parcels of land, one on the west bank of Hisehope Burn, the other (and larger) a few hundred yards to the east, straddling the headwaters of another small burn. The site is some 3 km west of the village of Castleside and 1 km north of the Smiddy Shaw Reservoir. The larger area adjoins the Muggleswick, Stanhope and Edmundbyers Commons and Blanchland Moor SSSI.

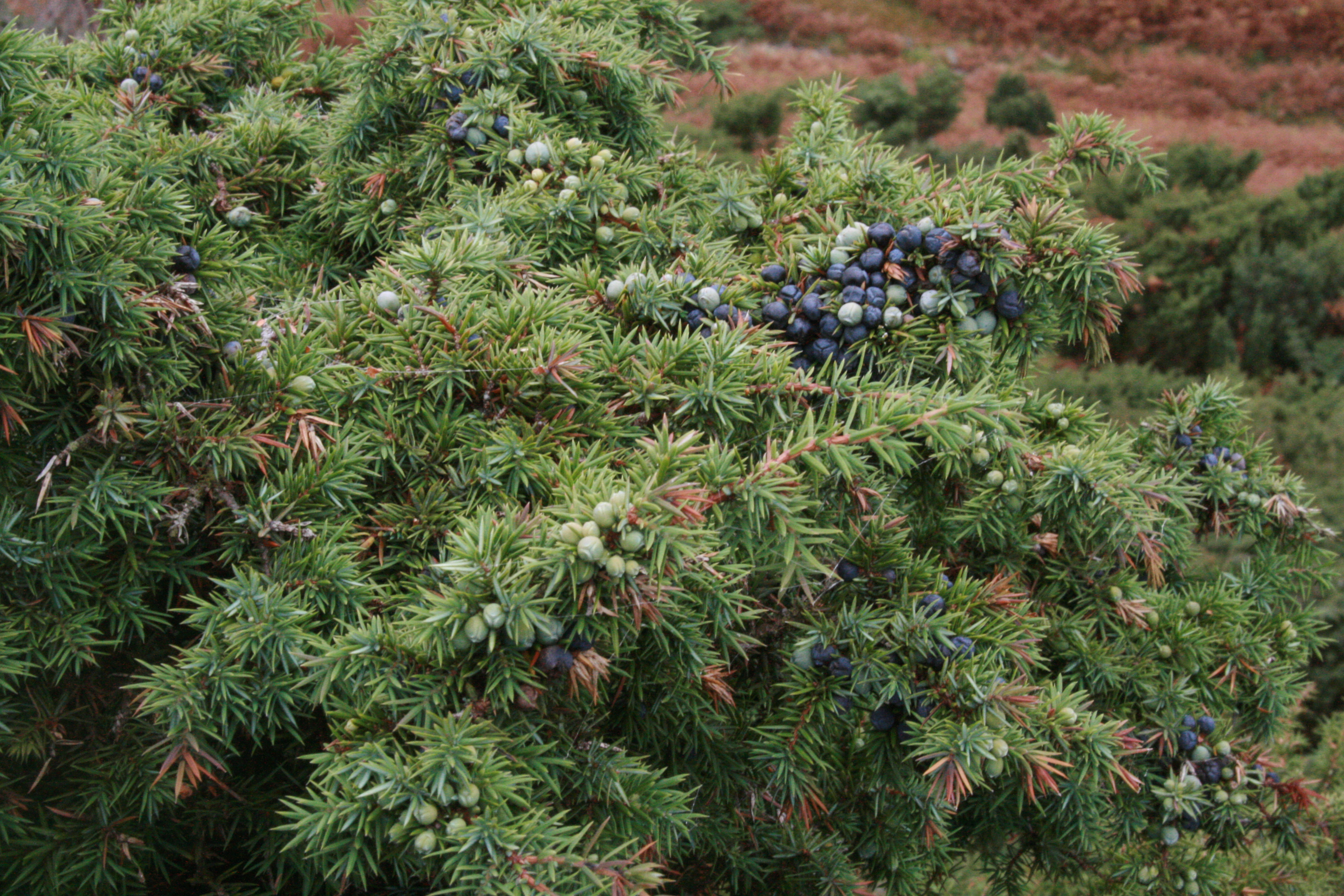
Juniper, Juniperus communis

The area adjacent to Hisehope Burn is predominantly a soligenous mire, with a sparse tree cover of downy birch, Betula pubescens, and alder, Alnus glutinosa; the mire is rich in sedges, Carex spp and bryophytes and contains several species that are localised in County Durham, including few-flowered spike rush, Eleocharis quinqueflora, grass-of-Parnassus, Parnassia palustris, sundew, Drosera rotundifolia, and lesser clubmoss, Selaginella selaginoides.

The other area has one of the most extensive stands of juniper, Juniperus communis, in County Durham. Unlike most populations of juniper in Britain, in which regeneration is, at best, sparse, this community is freely-regenerating and has a diverse age composition.
