= Muggleswick =

Coordinates: 54.844°N 1.937°W

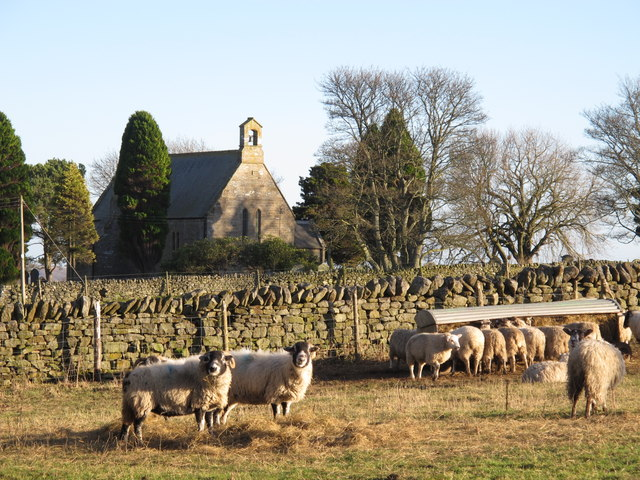
- All Saints Church

- Location within County Durham
- Population: 130 (2001)
- OS grid reference: NZ041499
- Civil parish: Muggleswick
- Unitary authority: County Durham
- Ceremonial county: County Durham
- Region: North East
- Country: England
- Sovereign state: United Kingdom
- Post town: CONSETT
- Postcode district: DH8
- Dialling code: 01207
- Police: Durham
- Fire: County Durham and Darlington
- Ambulance: North East
- UK Parliament: North Durham

Muggleswick is a village and civil parish in County Durham, England. It is situated a few miles to the west of Consett. the population was 130 at the 2001 Census reducing to 113 at the 2011 Census.

== Geography ==
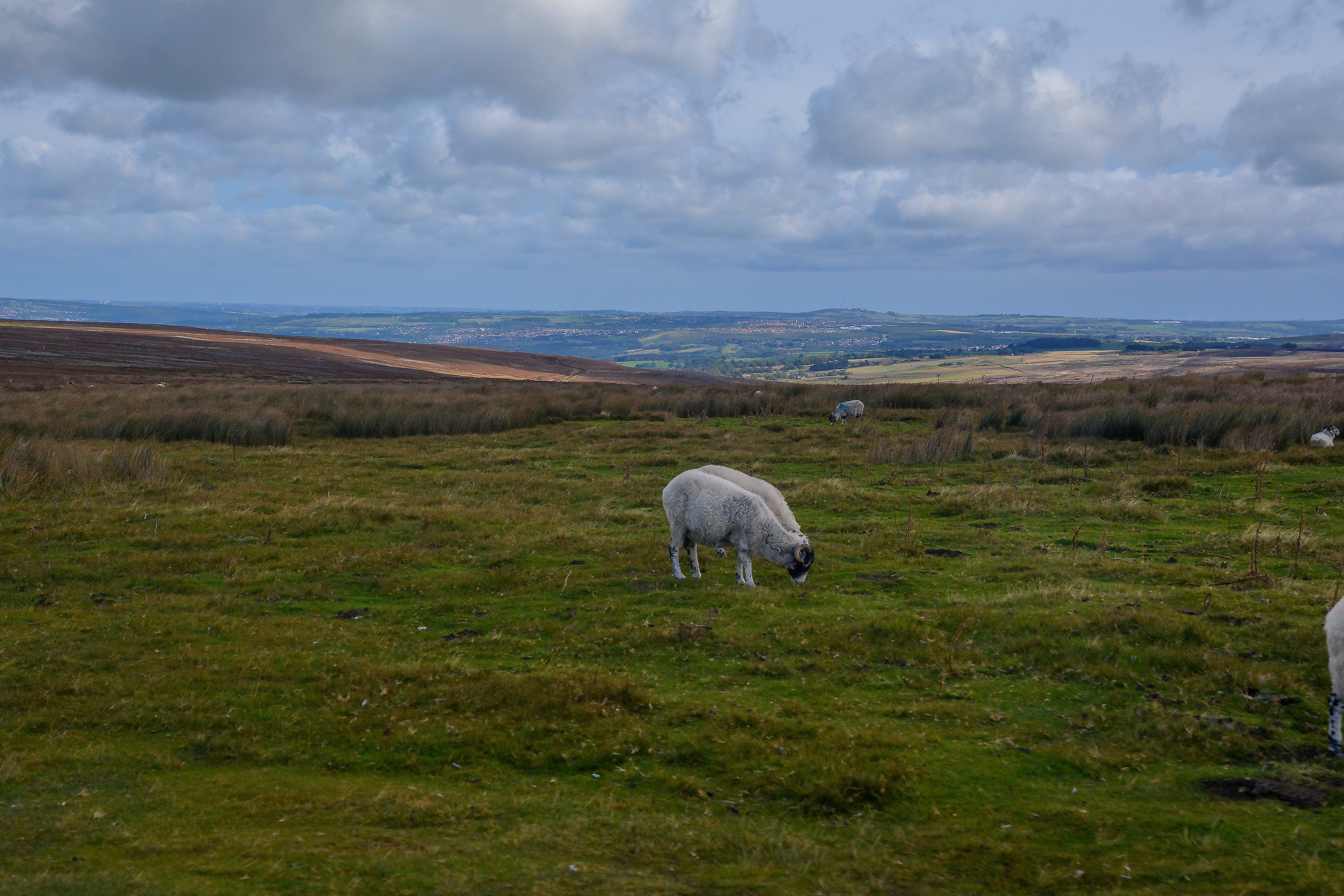
Muggleswick Common

A significant area of the south and west of the village is taken up by Muggleswick Common, an area of upland moorland used for grouse rearing (and associated game (food) shooting) and sheep grazing. This area consists predominantly of heather with encroaching bracken. The Common is part of the Muggleswick, Stanhope and Edmundbyers Commons and Blanchland Moor Site of Special Scientific Interest (SSSI), designated as such by Natural England for its habitat diversity and the presence of a range of plant and bird species of national and international importance.

To the east, the village is bordered by the Derwent Gorge and Horsleyhope Ravine SSSI. This area has been classified as such due to the range of plant species and areas that have remained free from human interference.

== History ==
Listed in the Boldon Book (1183).—“The Prior holds Muglyngwyc, as is expressed in his charter, as well of the Bishop's favour, as in exchange for Herdewic. And in Bishop Hatfield’s survey of c. 1382, “The Prior holds the manor of Mugliswyk in exchange for the vill of Herdwyk. The estate has remained ever since vested in the Church of Durham.”

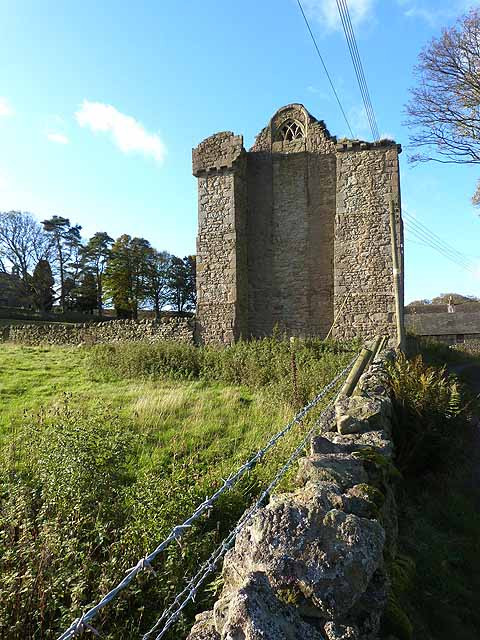
Grange ruins

There are the ruins of a hunting lodge, or grange, for the Prior of Durham, which is a listed building. The monastic grange was built for the priors of Durham by Prior Hugh of Darlington, while he held office between 1258 and 1272, on what is thought to have been the site of an earlier grange. The grange lay within a deer park, which Prior Hugh was granted permission to enclose in 1259. The buildings of the grange were in use throughout the medieval period; a document of 1464 records that the buildings consisted of a hall, chapel, grange and a dairy. The names Priory Farm and Grange Farm testify to the influence of Durham as do the stone remains of the grange including a wall suggesting a three-storey building, described as "impressive" by Pevsner.

The church (dedicated to All Saints) was built in 1259, probably as part of the grange. The present building dates from circa 1869. The Mayer tomb in the graveyard was made by the sculptor John Graham Lough.

In 1663 the so-called Muggleswick Plot took place (also referred to as the Derwentdale Plot, and similar to the Farnley Wood Plot). John Ellrington, a servant of Lady Foster of Blanchland, informed the authorities that there were seditious meetings taking place in the area with a plot to overthrow the government, parliament and the church. Ellrington implicated over 30 people including some of the gentry. The information was false but showed the febrile political situation of the time. The plot was taken seriously and Bishop Cosin sent in the militia and nine people were arrested. The others escaped.

== Amenities ==
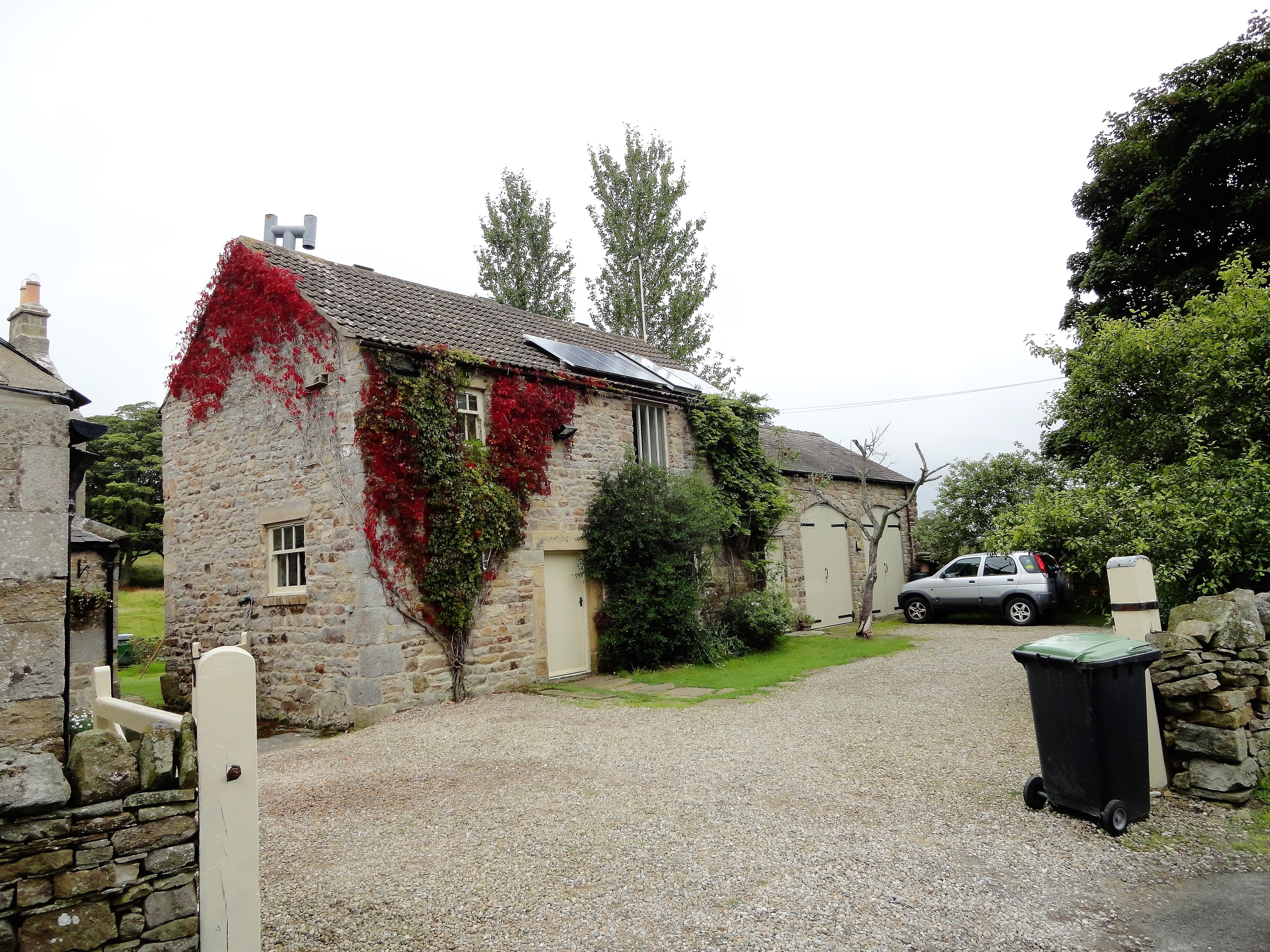
Converted farm buildings

The village has a number of farms and domestic dwellings as well as the Church of England church, generally accepted as dedicated to All Saints, and village hall (previously the school). Amenities other than that consist of the phone box with its adjacent litter bin. Agriculture is primarily sheep farming with some cattle and hay.

== Demographics ==
In the United Kingdom Census 2001 the population of the village was 130 with 66 male and 64 female

== Notable people ==
John Carr, the schoolmaster and writer, was born in Muggleswick.
