= Thrislington Plantation =

Nature reserve in County Durham, England

- Location within County Durham
- Location: MAGiC MaP
- Nearest town: Ferryhill
- Coordinates: 54°41′20″N 1°30′38″W
- Area: 22.72 ha (56.1 acres)
- Established: 1962 (as SSSI); 1992 (as NNR)
- Governing body: Natural England
- Website: Thrislington Plantation SSSI

Thrislington Plantation is a Site of Special Scientific Interest and a national nature reserve in County Durham, England. It is situated about 1 km east of Ferryhill, between the East Coast Main Line railway and the A1(M) road.

The site has one of the most important expanses of primary magnesian limestone grassland in Great Britain. In particular, it has the largest area of the grassland type which is characterised by blue moor-grass, Sesleria albicans, and small scabious, Scabiosa columbaria.

The eastern part of the site is undisturbed grassland which, as well as species commonly associated with magnesian limestone, has a small population of the locally rare mountain everlasting, Antennaria dioica, and good populations of dark-red helleborine, Epipactis atrorubens, and perennial flax, Linum perenne subsp. anglicum, both of which are nationally scarce.

The western part of the site has been disturbed by quarrying and the vegetation here consists of primary turf that was translocated between 1982 and 1990. Although it remains rich in herbs, the characteristic features of magnesian limestone grassland were lost during the translocation: blue moor-grass is uncommon, while coltsfoot, Tussilago farfara, and field sow-thistle, Sonchus arvensis, which entered the grassland during translocation, persist.

The area supports a diverse invertebrate fauna, which includes the nationally rare least minor moth, Photedes captiuncula, the nationally notable Durham argus butterfly, Aricia artaxerxes salmacis, and the common glow-worm, Lampyris noctiluca.

== Landfill ==
The adjacent quarry is destined to become a landfill site.
