= Tuthill Quarry =

Site of Special Scientific Interest in County Durham

- Location within County Durham
- Location: MAGiC MaP
- Nearest town: Peterlee
- Coordinates: 54°46′48″N 1°23′51″W
- Area: 10.71 ha (26.5 acres)
- Established: 1994
- Governing body: Natural England
- Website: Tuthill Quarry SSSI

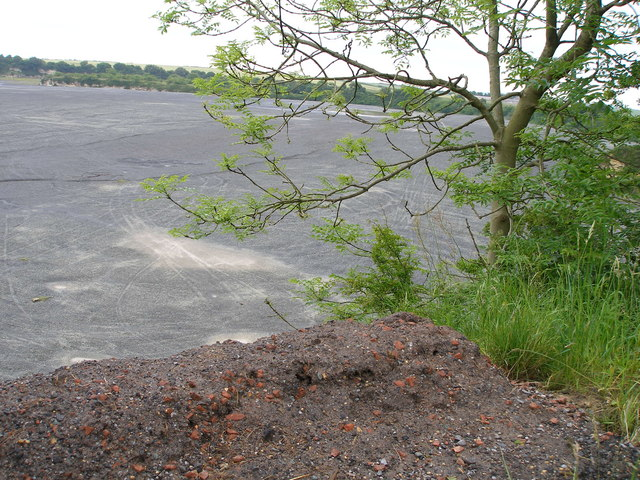
Infilled Tuthill Quarry

Tuthill Quarry is a Site of Special Scientific Interest in the County Durham district of north-east County Durham, England. It lies just over 1 km east of the village of Haswell.

The site occupies part of a disused quarry, in which have developed areas of primary and secondary magnesian limestone grassland. Such grassland is largely confined to County Durham and increasingly scarce even there. The grasslands at Tuthill Quarry are typical of the type, being characterised by the presence of blue moor-grass, Sesleria albicans, and small scabious, Scabiosa columbaria, but a number of less common species are also present, including common butterwort, Pinguicula vulgaris, and adder's-tongue fern, Ophioglossum vulgatum. There is a small patch of the nationally scarce bird's-eye primrose, Primula farinosa, and one of the few records from lowland Durham of lesser clubmoss, Selaginella selaginoides, is from this site.
