= Pike Whin Bog =

- Location within County Durham
- Location: MAGiC MaP
- Nearest town: Hartlepool
- Coordinates: 54°41′40″N 1°21′25″W
- Area: 1.25 ha (3.1 acres)
- Established: 1984
- Governing body: Natural England
- Website: Pike Whin Bog SSSI

Pike Whin Bog is a Site of Special Scientific Interest in the Easington district of east County Durham, England. It is situated just east of Hurworth Burn Reservoir, about 8 km west of Hartlepool.

The bog lies in a natural depression, in which the water table is at or above ground level for most of the year, and is one of the few remaining wetlands in lowland Durham.

The majority of the site is sedge fen, in which common cotton-grass, Eriophorum angustifolium, is the dominant species. A variety of grassland types occur around the edges of the fen.

Because of the scarcity of wetlands in lowland Durham, species associated with this habitat also have a very localised distribution. Particularly noteworthy at Pike Whin Bog are greater spearwort, Ranunculus lingua, slender tufted sedge, Carex acuta, marsh stitchwort, Stellaria palustris, and bog bean, Menyanthes trifoliata.
