= Hawthorn, County Durham =

Village in England

Coordinates: 54.803°N 1.349°W

Hawthorn
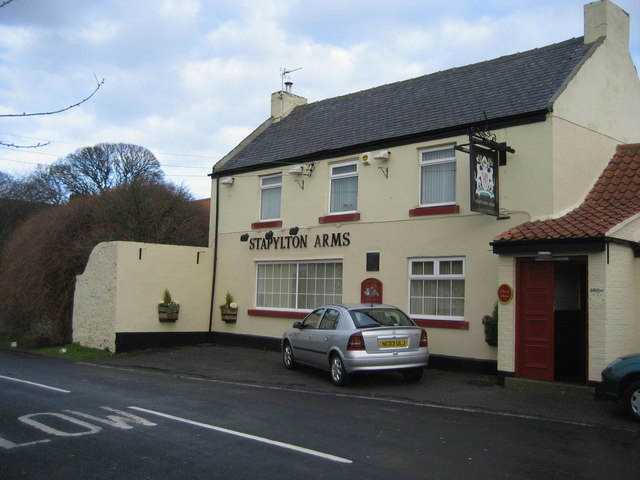
- The Stapylton Arms

- Location within County Durham
- Population: 500 (2011)
- OS grid reference: NZ419455
- Unitary authority: County Durham
- Ceremonial county: County Durham
- Region: North East
- Country: England
- Sovereign state: United Kingdom
- Post town: SUNDERLAND
- Postcode district: SR7
- Police: Durham
- Fire: County Durham and Darlington
- Ambulance: North East

Hawthorn is a village in County Durham, England. It is situated between Seaham and Easington.

The only public building in the village of Hawthorn is the Staplyton Arms, a small public house situated in roughly the centre of the village.

Close by Hawthorn Dene's mouth, there was, until the late 1970s, a large Gothic Revival house, named "Hawthorn Towers"; once the family home of Major Anderson, who was connected with the Building of the Middlesbrough Transporter Bridge. It was later the home of the Pemberton family, including John Stapylton Grey Pemberton. It had a private railway halt whose platform can still be seen near the Hawthorn Dene viaduct.
