= Hulam Fen =

- Location within County Durham
- Location: MAGiC MaP
- Nearest town: Hartlepool
- Coordinates: 54°43′49″N 1°19′9″W
- Area: 0.2 ha (0.49 acres)
- Established: 1986
- Governing body: Natural England
- Website: Hulam Fen SSSI

Hulam Fen is a Site of Special Scientific Interest in the Easington district of east County Durham, England, just south of the village of Hesleden, about 8 km north-west of Hartlepool.

Though small, the site supports a range of wetland and grassland communities in an area that is otherwise given over to arable agriculture. At the heart of the site is a hydrostatic spring that is fed by an aquifer in the underlying Magnesian Limestone and around which have developed soligenous mire, tall fen and marshy grassland.
