= Pow Hill Bog =

Protected natural area in County Durham, England

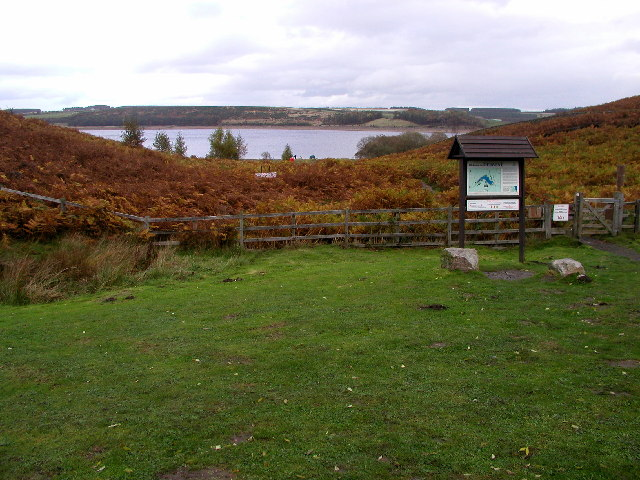
- Pow Hill Country Park and Derwent Reservoir

- Location within County Durham
- Location: MAGiC MaP
- Nearest town: Consett
- Coordinates: 54°51′41″N 1°59′12″W
- Area: 6.7 ha (17 acres)
- Established: 1986
- Governing body: Natural England
- Website: Pow Hill Bog SSSI

Pow Hill Bog is a Site of Special Scientific Interest in the Wear Valley district of County Durham, England. It lies alongside Derwent Reservoir, approximately 2 km north-west of the village of Edmundbyers and adjacent to the Edmundbyers Common portion of the Muggleswick, Stanhope and Edmundbyers Commons and Blanchland Moor SSSI.

The site contains two types of mire, a valley mire and a soligenous mire, the former a scarce habitat in County Durham. There are also areas of heathland and semi-improved grassland, as well as small plantations of larch and spruce.

The wetter parts of the valley mire are characterised by an abundance of bog mosses, Sphagnum spp, in association with species such as common cottongrass, Eriophorum angustifolium, star sedge, Carex echinata, and bog asphodel, Narthecium ossifragum. The drier areas are heathland, with heather, Calluna vulgaris, hare's-tail cottongrass, Eriophorum vaginatum, cross-leaved heath, Erica tetralix, and common sedge, Carex nigra.

The soligenous mire is characterised by sharp-flowered rush, Juncus acutiflorus, and purple moor-grass, Molinia caerulea. Several local species are also present, including narrow-leaved buckler-fern, Dryopteris carthusiana, lesser skullcap, Scutellaria minor, and grass of Parnassus, Parnassia palustris.

The site is located within the Pow Hill Country Park, a recreational area managed by Durham County Council.

== Land ownership ==
All land within Pow Hill Bog SSSI is owned by the local authority.
