= Crime Rigg and Sherburn Hill Quarries =

Site of Special Scientific Interest in County Durham, England

- Location within County Durham
- Location: MAGiC MaP
- Nearest city: City of Durham
- Coordinates: 54°46′7″N 1°27′58″W
- Area: 23.22 ha (57.4 acres)
- Established: 1968
- Governing body: Natural England
- Website: Crime Rigg Quarry SSSI

Crime Rigg and Sherburn Hill Quarries is a Site of Special Scientific Interest in County Durham, England. It lies about 1 kilometre (0.6 mi) east of the village of Sherburn Hill and about 7 kilometres (4.3 mi) east of the city of Durham.

The site is a working quarry in which is exposed a sequence of Lower Permian Yellow Sands overlying Marl Slate and Lower Magnesian Limestone. The exposures of Permian sands exhibit complex cross-bedding that is believed to represent ancient seif dune deposits.
