= Baldersdale Woodlands =

Woodland in County Durham, England

- Location within County Durham
- Location: MAGiC MaP
- Nearest town: Barnard Castle
- Coordinates: 54°34′32″N 2°0′47″W
- Area: 19.6 ha (48 acres)
- Established: 1991
- Governing body: Natural England
- Website: Baldersdale Woodlands SSSI

Baldersdale Woodlands is a Site of Special Scientific Interest in County Durham, England. It consists primarily of ancient, semi-natural woodland growing on steep valley slopes, including scree, on both banks of the River Balder over a stretch of some 3 km, upstream (i.e. west) of the village of Cotherstone. The site has a rich faunal assemblage and the woodland and associated stretch of the river is home to a variety of birds, including dipper and goosander.

In part, the site derives its importance from the proximity of similarly protected sites in other valleys in the River Tees catchment area; the Shipley and Great Woods SSSI occupies a similar position in the valley of the Tees immediately north of Cotherstone.

The condition of the site was last assessed by Natural England in September 2009, when it was mostly rated as "favourable"; a small area, just over 10 percent of the total area, is suffering from cattle grazing but was rated as "recovering".
