= Hunder Beck Juniper =

Protected area in County Durham, England

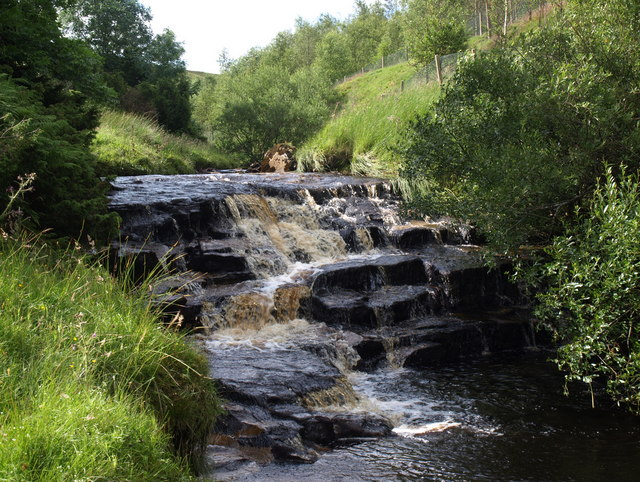
- Hunder Beck waterfall and the surrounding banks and vegetation

- Location within County Durham
- Location: MAGiC MaP
- Nearest town: Barnard Castle
- Coordinates: 54°33′21″N 2°6′21″W
- Area: 3.45 ha (8.5 acres)
- Established: 1994
- Governing body: Natural England
- Website: Hunder Beck Juniper SSSI

Hunder Beck Juniper is a Site of Special Scientific Interest in the Teesdale district of south-west County Durham, England. It lies between the Balderhead and Blackton Reservoirs and adjoins the Cotherstone Moor SSSI to the south.

The site, which is situated on the east bank of the Hunder Beck, is notable as one of only three in County Durham where there are significant stands of upland juniper, Juniperus communis, scrub, a vegetation type which is particularly uncommon in the North Pennines.

On the upper slopes the juniper is associated with species-rich acid grassland, which is dominated by sheep's fescue, Festuca ovina, common bent, Agrostis capillaris, heath bedstraw, Galium saxatile, and tormentil, Potentilla erecta. A locally rare fern, moonwort, Botrychium lunaria is one of the less common species.

Where the juniper is densest, the vegetation has a woodland character, with rowan, Sorbus aucuparia, and ash, Fraxinus excelsior, among the tree species present in small numbers, but though juniper of a variety of ages is present, there is no evidence of recent regeneration.

On the shallower slopes, the juniper is associated with a species-poor acid flush vegetation that is dominated by rushes, Juncus spp.
