= Yoden Village Quarry =

Site of Special Scientific Interest in County Durham, England

- Location within County Durham
- Location: MAGiC MaP
- Nearest town: Peterlee, County Durham
- Coordinates: 54°46′8″N 1°19′23″W
- Area: 0.4 ha (0.99 acres)
- Established: 1988
- Governing body: Natural England
- Website: Yoden Village Quarry SSSI

Yoden Village Quarry is a Site of Special Scientific Interest in the Easington district of east County Durham, England. It is a disused quarry in the Horden district of Peterlee, adjacent to the site of the medieval village of Yoden.

The site has been classed as of national importance in the Geological Conservation Review because it is the only locality in North-east England where the reef-complex of the Middle Magnesian Limestone Ford Formation is exposed.

== Land ownership ==
All land within Yoden Village Quarry SSSI is owned by the local authority
