= Low Redford Meadows =

Protected area in County Durham, England

- Location within County Durham
- Location: MAGiC MaP
- Nearest town: Bishop Auckland
- Coordinates: 54°40′25″N 1°52′33″W
- Area: 9.3 ha (23 acres)
- Established: 1991
- Governing body: Natural England
- Website: Low Redford Meadows SSSI

Low Redford Meadows is a Site of Special Scientific Interest in the Teesdale district of County Durham, England. It consists of two separate areas of meadows, situated in the floodplain and on the valley slopes of Bedburn Beck, 2 km upstream from the village of Bedburn. Like Frog Wood Bog SSSI, a short distance upstream, the meadows lie within the confines of Hamsterley Forest.

The site is important as preserving a rich assemblage of plant species, in a habitat that has become scarcer due to intensive agricultural practices. A wide variety of flowering plants is found, with some, such as wood cranesbill, Geranium sylvaticum, great burnet, Sanguisorba officinalis, and cat's ear, Hypochaeris radicata, present in such abundance as to be locally dominant in different fields.
