= Stony Cut, Cold Hesledon =

Protected area in County Durham, England

- Location within County Durham
- Location: MAGiC MaP
- Nearest town: Seaham
- Coordinates: 54°49′09″N 1°21′1″W
- Area: 0.83 ha (2.1 acres)
- Established: 1996
- Governing body: Natural England
- Website: Stony Cut, Cold Hesledon SSSI

Stony Cut, Cold Hesledon is a Site of Special Scientific Interest in the Easington district of north-east County Durham, England. It consists of a shallow cutting alongside Seaham Golf Course close to the village of Cold Hesledon.

The cutting exposes a section of Late Permian Ford Formation (Zechstein) dolomite in which the transition from the flat to the crest of the shelf-edge of an ancient reef is clearly visible. The site has been designated as of national importance in the Geological Conservation Review.

== Land ownership ==
All land within Stony Cut Cold Hesledon SSSI is owned by the local authority.
