= Middleton Quarry =

Site of Special Scientific Interest in County Durham, England

- Location within County Durham
- Location: MAGiC MaP
- Nearest town: Middleton-in-Teesdale
- Coordinates: 54°36′58″N 2°4′53″W
- Established: 1964
- Governing body: Natural England
- Website: Middleton Quarry SSSI

Middleton Quarry is a Site of Special Scientific Interest in the Teesdale district of west County Durham, England. It is a disused quarry, from which Whin Sill stone was formerly excavated. It lies just south of the River Tees, opposite the village of Middleton-in-Teesdale on the river's northern bank.

Since mineral working ceased, the quarry has been re-colonised by a variety of vegetation types. On the quarry floor, natural seepage has given rise to areas of open water, which grade into a variety of soligenous mire and fen vegetation types.

Where a skeletal soil layer has developed on the quarry floor and spoil heaps, patches of grassland occur, with species characteristic of base-rich soils, such as quaking grass, Briza media, and limestone bedstraw, Galium sterneri. On shallow slopes, this gives way to a neutral grassland characterised by false oat-grass, Arrhenatherum elatius, and Yorkshire fog, Holcus lanatus. Above the quarry, this is replaced by acid grassland, in which wavy hair-grass, Deschampsia flexuosa, is dominant.

The quarry supports a moth fauna which includes at least two species, the northern rustic (Standfussiana lucernea) and the anomalous (Stilbia anomala) which are rare in north-east England.
