= Neasham Fen =

- Location within County Durham
- Location: MAGiC MaP
- Nearest town: Darlington
- Coordinates: 54°29′54″N 1°29′23″W
- Area: 2.5 ha (6.2 acres)
- Established: 1992
- Governing body: Natural England
- Website: Neasham Fen SSSI

Neasham Fen is a Site of Special Scientific Interest in the Darlington district of County Durham, England. It lies on the floodplain of the River Tees, 5.2 km south-east of Darlington.

Neasham Fen is a small in-filled kettle hole. Analysis of the deposits at the site has provided an important record of the vegetational history and changing climate of the area during the Flandrian period. Radiocarbon dates of between 9082±90 and 1213±60 yr BP have been obtained from the deposits, which have also yielded pollen records covering the same period.
