= Newton Ketton Meadow =

Protected area in County Durham, England

- Location within County Durham
- Location: MAGiC MaP
- Nearest town: Darlington
- Coordinates: 54°34′51″N 1°30′9″W
- Area: 1.8 ha (4.4 acres)
- Established: 1989
- Governing body: Natural England
- Website: Newton Ketton Meadow SSSI

Newton Ketton Meadow is a Site of Special Scientific Interest in the Darlington district of Durham, England. It is situated alongside a small tributary of the River Skerne, about 2 km south-west of the village of Great Stainton and 3 km east of the village of Brafferton.

The site is one of the few remaining traditional hay meadows on the coastal plain between the River Tees and the River Tyne and supports a rich variety of species characteristic of this habitat.

Great burnet, Sanguisorba officinalis, is present in abundance, as are herbs such as sneezewort, Achillea ptarmica, cuckooflower, Cardamine pratensis, meadowsweet, Filipendula ulmaria, and common spotted orchid, Dactylorhiza fuchsii. Grasses include sweet vernal-grass, Anthoxanthum odoratum, common bent, Agrostis capillaris, and downy oat-grass, Avenula pubescens. There are also a notable variety of sedges, including glaucous sedge, Carex flacca, hairy sedge, C. hirta, tawny sedge, C. hostiana, carnation sedge, C. panicea, and flea sedge, C. pulicaris.
