= Foster's Hush =

- Location within County Durham
- Location: MAGiC MaP
- Nearest town: Barnard Castle
- Coordinates: 54°34′45″N 2°13′8″W
- Area: 1.3 ha (3.2 acres)
- Governing body: Natural England
- Website: Foster's Hush SSSI

Foster's Hush is a Site of Special Scientific Interest in the Teesdale district of west County Durham, England. It is located in the valley of Lune Head Beck, immediately south of the B6276 road, 6 km upstream of the Selset Reservoir dam.

At Foster's Hush, workings of a mineral-rich vein in the Great Limestone and Tuft Sandstone have exposed mineralisation of a rare mineral, witherite. The site has been listed by the Geological Conservation Review, both for the excellent mineral specimens it has provided and because it is the only locality in the North Pennines ore-field where witherite mineralisation can be observed in situ at the surface.
