= Crag Gill =

Protected area in County Durham, England

- Location within County Durham
- Location: MAGiC MaP
- Nearest town: Barnard Castle
- Coordinates: 54°36′26″N 1°57′38″W
- Area: 2.3 ha (5.7 acres)
- Established: 1984
- Governing body: Natural England
- Website: Crag Gill SSSI

Crag Gill is a Site of Special Scientific Interest in the Teesdale district in south-west County Durham, England. It lies about 3 km east of the village of Eggleston, just off the B6282 road, which separates it from the Bollihope, Pikestone, Eggleston and Woodland Fells SSSI to the north.

Crag Gill consists of an exposure of late Namurian limestones, sandstones and shales that form a Yoredale-type sequence. The exposure is the type locality of the Whitestone limestone, a marker horizon for Namurian stratigraphy.
