= Green Croft and Langley Moor =

Greencroft and Langley Moor
- Location within County Durham
- Location: MAGiC MaP
- Nearest town: Consett
- Coordinates: 54°51′N 1°44′W
- Area: 12.3 ha (30 acres)
- Established: 1989
- Governing body: Natural England
- Website: Greencroft and Langley Moor SSSI

Green Croft and Langley Moor is a Site of Special Scientific Interest in the Derwentside district in north County Durham, England. It consists of three separate areas, two to the south of Annfield Plain and one just west of Quaking Houses, between the towns of Consett, to the west, and Stanley, to the east.

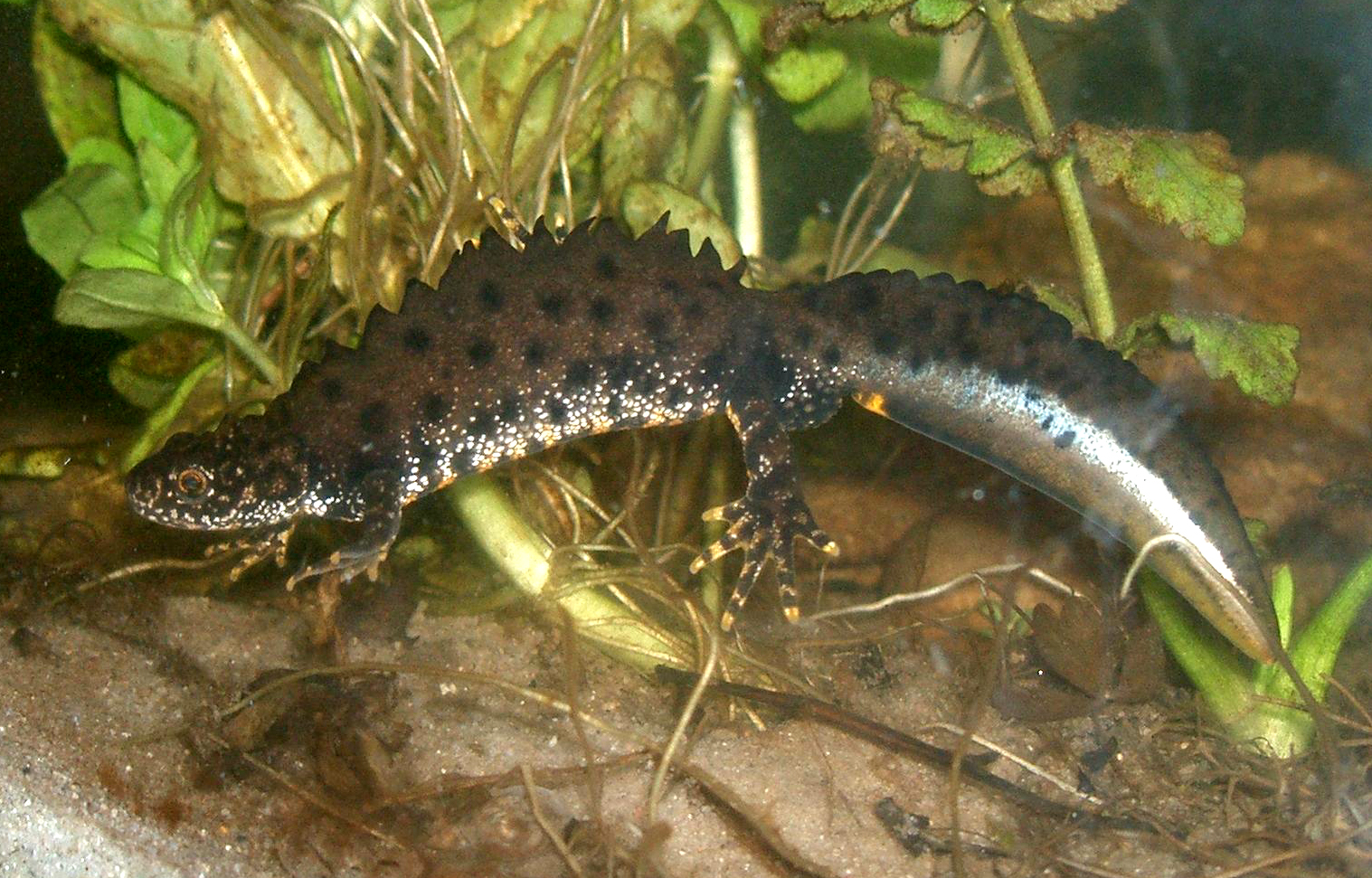
A male Great Crested Newt, Triturus cristatus

All three locations contain areas of heath and mire, habitats that are, except at Waldridge Fell, rare and fragmented in lowland Durham. At Langley Moor there is an area of woodland which is dominated by downy birch, Betula pubescens, with some sessile oak, Quercus petraea.

Apart from its importance for habitat conservation, the site also includes some small ponds, which support a breeding population of great crested newts, Triturus cristatus, and a dragonfly, the black darter, Sympetrum danae, which is rare in north-east England.

The great crested newt is a European Protected Species and one of only three amphibians that are protected under the UK Biodiversity Action Plan.
