= Far High House Meadows =

- Location within County Durham
- Location: MAGiC MaP
- Nearest town: Stanhope
- Coordinates: 54°44′23″N 2°15′3″W
- Area: 5.5 ha (14 acres)
- Established: 1990
- Governing body: Natural England
- Website: Far High House Meadows SSSI

Far High House Meadows is a Site of Special Scientific Interest in Upper Weardale in west County Durham, England. It consists of three fields, located just south of Burnhope Reservoir, some 3 km west of the village of Ireshopeburn. Two of the fields are maintained as northern hay meadows by traditional farming methods, without re-seeding or the application of artificial fertilisers; the third is grazed as pasture.

The hay fields are dominated by common bent, Agrostis capillaris, and sweet vernal-grass, Anthoxanthum odoratum, and support a diversity of forbs, among which globe-flower, Trollius europaeus, and marsh-marigold, Caltha palustris, are well represented, with early-purple orchid, Orchis mascula, among the species present in the wetter areas.

The pasture is a mix of acidic upland grassland, dry grassland and flushes, the last dominated by rushes and sedges.
