= Fairy Holes Cave =

Cave in northern England

- Location within County Durham
- Location: MAGiC MaP
- Nearest town: Stanhope
- Coordinates: 54°43′0″N 2°6′0″W
- Area: 208.8 ha (516 acres)
- Established: 1961
- Governing body: Natural England
- Website: Fairy Holes Cave SSSI

Fairy Holes Cave is a Site of Special Scientific Interest in the Wear Valley district of west County Durham, England. It is located on the western flanks of Snowhope Moor, on the right bank of Westernhope Burn, some 3 km south-west of the village of Eastgate.

The cave is the longest known stream passage in the Yoredale Limestone of the North Pennines and the best developed example of its type. The Geological Conservation Review classes it as being of national importance.
