= Brasside Pond =

Protected area in County Durham, England

- Location within County Durham
- Location: Durham, North East, England
- Coordinates: 54°48′5″N 1°32′48″W
- Area: 25.1 ha (62 acres)
- Established: 1966 / 1985
- Governing body: Natural England
- Website: Map of site

Brasside Pond is a Site of Special Scientific Interest just north of the city of Durham, England. The site occupies an area of former clay pits sandwiched between the River Wear to the south and Frankland Prison to the north and is split into two parts by a disused railway line.

North of the railway, adjacent to the prison, are two large ponds, the result of flooding of the old clay workings. These are one of the largest expanses of unpolluted open water, reservoirs excepted, in County Durham and are the most important breeding site for wildfowl in the county.

The portion south of the old railway is a mix of small ponds and fen, surrounded by acid grassland.
