= Bowlees and Friar House Meadows =

Protected area in County Durham, England

- Location within County Durham
- Location: Teesdale, North East, England
- Nearest town: Middleton-in-Teesdale
- Coordinates: 54°38′58″N 2°9′16″W
- Area: 5.61 ha (13.9 acres)
- Established: 1991
- Governing body: Natural England
- Website: Bowlees and Friar House Meadows SSSI

Bowlees and Friar House Meadows is a Site of Special Scientific Interest in the Teesdale district of west County Durham, England. It consists of three traditionally-managed hay meadows in the valley of the River Tees immediately upstream of Low Force waterfall.

The site is important as preserving a rich assemblage of plant species, including some that are locally rare, in a habitat that is widely threatened by intensive agricultural practices.
