= Derwent Gorge and Horsleyhope Ravine =

Woodland Site of Special Scientific Interest in northern England

- Location within County Durham
- Location: MAGiC MaP
- Nearest town: Consett
- Coordinates: 54°50′0″N 1°55′3″W
- Area: 83 ha (210 acres)
- Established: 1976
- Governing body: Natural England
- Website: Derwent Gorge and Horsleyhope Ravine SSSI

Derwent Gorge and Horsleyhope Ravine is a Site of Special Scientific Interest in the Derwentside district of north County Durham and the Tynedale district of south Northumberland, England. It consists of two separate areas of woodland, one in the gorge of the River Derwent and the other in the ravine of its tributary, the Horsleyhope Burn, south-east of the village of Muggleswick.

On the dry acidic soils of the upper slopes, the woodland is dominated by sessile oak, Quercus petraea. Some areas have been coppiced in the past but where the slopes are steepest, and least accessible, there appears to have been no human interference.
