= Butterby Oxbow =

Wetland

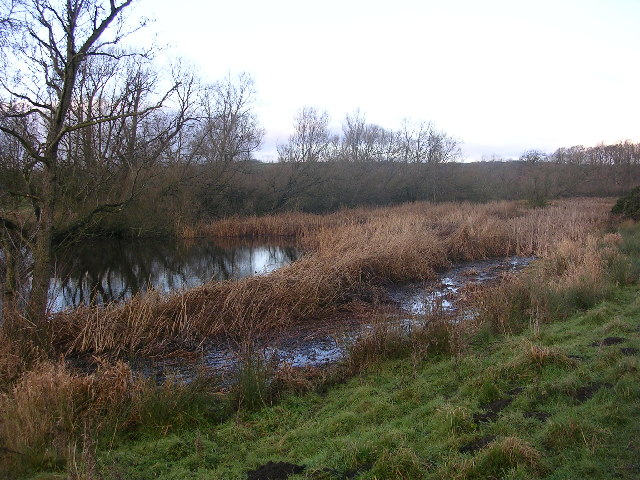
- Oxbow lake at Low Butterby

- Location within County Durham
- Location: MAGiC MaP
- Nearest city: Durham
- Coordinates: 54°44′44″N 1°34′25″W
- Area: 7.29 ha (18.0 acres)
- Established: 1957
- Governing body: Natural England
- Website: Butterby Oxbow SSSI

Butterby Oxbow is a Site of Special Scientific Interest in County Durham, England. It consists of a former meander of the River Wear which was isolated from the main river in 1811 when, to reduce flooding in the area, a new channel was constructed across the neck of the meander. It is located about 3 km south of the centre of Durham and 1.2 km north of the nearest village, Croxdale.

The site is notable for the succession series of swamp, fen and fen-carr which has developed and which is rarely found as a complete sequence in the county. It is locally important as a roosting and wintering area for wildfowl.
