= Greenfoot Quarry =

Disused quarry in Durham

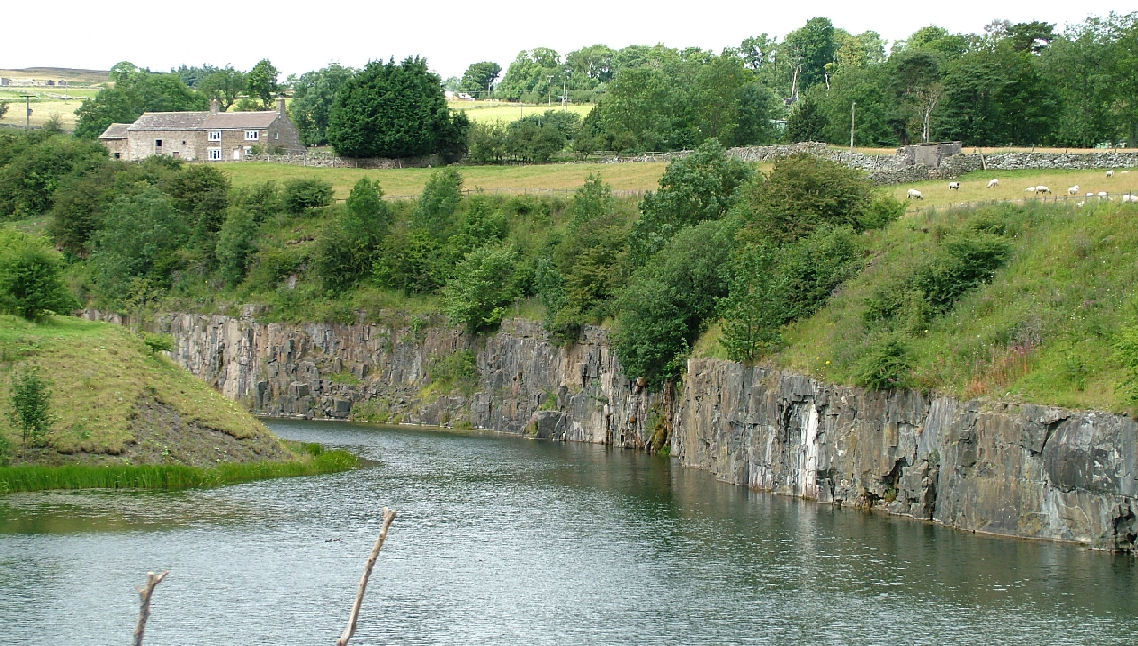
- Greenfoot Quarry

- Location within County Durham
- Location: MAGiC MaP
- Nearest town: Stanhope
- Coordinates: 54°44′54″N 2°1′43″W
- Area: 0.9 ha (2.2 acres)
- Established: 1984
- Governing body: Natural England
- Website: Greenfoot Quarry SSSI

Greenfoot Quarry is a Site of Special Scientific Interest in the Wear Valley district of west County Durham, England. It is a disused quarry in the Wear valley, 1 km upstream from the village of Stanhope.

The site has national geological importance for its exposures of the Little Whin Sill; there are other exposures in the bed of the Wear near the quarry, but none shows so complete of an exposure as Greenfoot Quarry. At the western end of the quarry is a unique exposure that displays columnar jointing in the sill with limestone exposed above and below the intrusion.
