= Old Moss Lead Vein =

- Location within County Durham
- Location: MAGiC MaP
- Nearest town: Alston, Cumbria
- Coordinates: 54°47′5″N 2°16′50″W
- Area: 0.6 ha (1.5 acres)
- Established: 1961
- Governing body: Natural England
- Website: Old Moss Lead Vein SSSI

Old Moss Lead Vein, also known as Killhope Head, is a Site of Special Scientific Interest in the Wear Valley district of County Durham, England. It consists of an exposure of a mineral vein in the valley of the Killhope Burn, just upstream from the North of England Lead Mining Museum.

The vein is visible as a 5-metre thick intrusion trending northeast–southwest through the Great Limestone. Mineralisation in the vein typifies the inner fluorite zone of the North Pennines Orefield, with galena and sphalerite in the centre of the vein giving way to fluorite and siderite toward the periphery. The site, under the name Killhope Head, has been designated of national importance in the Geological Conservation Review.
