= West Park Meadows =

- Location within County Durham
- Location: MAGiC MaP
- Nearest town: Middleton-in-Teesdale
- Coordinates: 54°36′6″N 2°5′37″W
- Area: 6.7 ha (17 acres)
- Established: 1989
- Governing body: Natural England
- Website: West Park Meadows SSSI

West Park Meadows is a Site of Special Scientific Interest in the Teesdale district of County Durham, England. It is situated in Lunedale, just north of Grassholme Reservoir, about 1 1/2 miles (2.4 km) upstream from the village of Mickleton.

The site consists of two large hay meadows, which are managed in a traditional manner, without re-seeding or the use of artificial fertilisers, and which, as a consequence, support a rich variety of species characteristic of northern hay meadows, a habitat that is diminishing under the threat from intensive agriculture.

Species that are present in abundance include great burnet, Sanguisorba officinalis, wood crane's-bill, Geranium sylvaticum, and meadowsweet, Filipendula ulmaria, while common spotted orchid, Dactylorhiza fuchsii, and early purple orchid, Orchis mascula, are among the species found on the steeper, uncut banks within the meadows.
