= West Newlandside Meadows =

Protected area in County Durham, England

- Location within County Durham
- Location: MAGiC MaP
- Nearest town: Stanhope, County Durham
- Coordinates: 54°43′55″N 2°2′39″W
- Area: 12.5 ha (31 acres)
- Established: 1990
- Governing body: Natural England
- Website: West Newlandside Meadows SSSI

West Newlandside Meadows is a Site of Special Scientific Interest in the Wear Valley district of County Durham, England. It lies 3 km south-west of the village of Stanhope.

The area is drained by two small burns, tributaries of the River Wear and consists of several fields that are managed as traditional northern hay meadows, a habitat that is threatened by intensive agricultural practices.

The meadows are rich in grassland species: the nationally rare northern hawk's beard, Crepis mollis, is plentiful, and the locally rare adder's tongue, Ophioglossum vulgatum, and frog orchid, Coeloglossum viride, are also present.

A different vegetation is found where there are banks that are too steep to be cut; here the calcareous soils support such species as fairy flax, Linum catharticum, harebell, Campanula rotundifolia, and mountain pansy, Viola lutea.
