= Dabble Bank =

- Location within County Durham
- Location: MAGiC MaP
- Nearest city: City of Durham
- Coordinates: 54°47′5″N 1°26′5″W
- Area: 4.12 ha (10.2 acres)
- Established: 2002
- Governing body: Natural England
- Website: Dabble Bank SSSI

Dabble Bank is a Site of Special Scientific Interest in the County Durham district of County Durham, England. It lies about 1 km west of the village of Haswell and about 9 km east of the city of Durham.

The site is important for its communities of nationally scarce grassland on Magnesian Limestone and in particular for its unusual location, in a small valley cut into the limestone plateau.

A feature of the site is grassland characterised by downy oat-grass, Avenula pubescens, this being a vegetation type which nationally has a scattered distribution on lowland limestones and which is rare in County Durham. Among the species found is the pyramidal orchid, Anacamptis pyramidalis, which is rare in the county.
