= Cornriggs Meadows =

Protected area in County Durham, England

- Location within County Durham
- Location: MAGiC MaP
- Nearest town: Stanhope
- Coordinates: 54°46′10″N 2°14′24″W
- Area: 15.2 ha (38 acres)
- Established: 1989
- Governing body: Natural England
- Website: Cornriggs Meadows SSSI

Cornriggs Meadows is a Site of Special Scientific Interest in Upper Weardale in north-west County Durham, England. It consists of a group of fields, located in the Wear valley, 1 km north-west of the village of Cowshill. Most of the fields are maintained as hay meadows by traditional farming methods.

Among a varied grassland flora, one field contains a large colony of a rare lady's mantle, Alchemilla acutiloba , which is endemic to Weardale and Teesdale.
