= Kilmond Scar =

- Location within County Durham
- Location: MAGiC MaP
- Nearest town: Barnard Castle
- Coordinates: 54°30′59″N 1°57′27″W
- Area: 4.5 ha (11 acres)
- Established: 1963
- Governing body: Natural England
- Website: Kilmond Scar SSSI

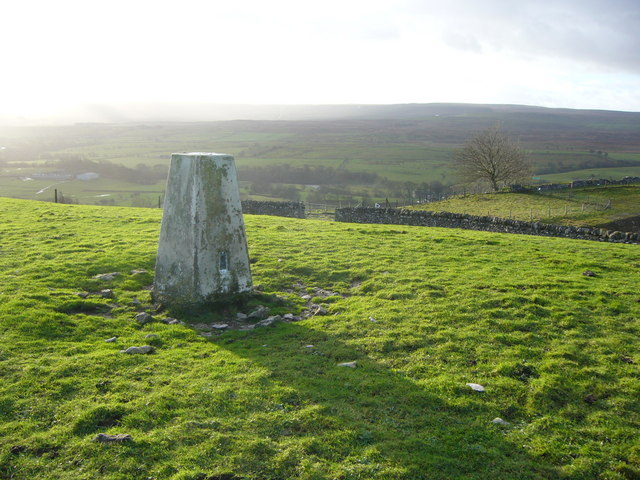
Kilmond Scar

Kilmond Scar is a Site of Special Scientific Interest in the County Durham district of south-west County Durham, England. It lies just south of the A66 road, about 3 km east of the village of Bowes.

Kilmond Scar is a prominent south-facing scarp of Upper Carboniferous Limestone. Its rock ledges and scree slopes support a variety of drought-tolerant flora. Elsewhere, deeper limestone soils support a diversity of calcareous grassland species.
