= Charity Land =

Protected area in County Durham, England

- Location within County Durham
- Location: MAGiC MaP
- Nearest town: Sedgefield
- Coordinates: 54°42′16″N 1°25′8″W
- Area: 5.84 ha (14.4 acres)
- Established: 1999
- Governing body: Natural England
- Website: Charity Land SSSI

Charity Land is a Site of Special Scientific Interest in the Sedgefield district of County Durham, England. It covers an area on both banks of the River Skerne, just to the north-east of the village of Trimdon.

The habitat of the site is unimproved neutral grassland, underlain by magnesian limestone. Once widespread on the limestone plateau of eastern Durham, such grasslands have mostly been destroyed by modern agricultural practices, the few remaining areas being small and highly fragmented. Charity Land is important as one of the few remaining examples of this habitat.

The fields are dominated by grass species, but a variety of grassland forbs are present.
