= Causey Bank Mires =

- Location within County Durham
- Location: MAGiC MaP
- Nearest town: Consett
- Coordinates: 54°54′11″N 1°40′41″W
- Area: 6.8 ha (17 acres)
- Established: 1987
- Governing body: Natural England
- Website: Causey Bank Mires SSSI

Causey Bank Mires is a Site of Special Scientific Interest in the Derwentside district of County Durham, England. It lies alongside and to the west of the Tanfield Railway, just under 1 km north of the Causey Arch.

The site consists of a series of flushes with scrub, surrounded by acid and neutral grassland, a habitat with a restricted distribution in County Durham. A number of locally rare plant species are found in the area, including globe-flower, Trollius europaeus.
