= Trimdon Limestone Quarry =

Site of Special Scientific Interest and abandoned quarry in County Durham, England

- Location within County Durham
- Location: MAGiC MaP
- Nearest town: Ferryhill; Sedgefield
- Coordinates: 54°42′43″N 1°26′20″W
- Area: 0.8 ha (2.0 acres)
- Established: 1992
- Governing body: Natural England
- Website: Trimdon Limestone Quarry SSSI

Trimdon Limestone Quarry is a Site of Special Scientific Interest in County Durham, England. It lies about 1/2 mile (0.80 km) west of the village of Trimdon Grange and about 2 1/2 miles (4.0 km) east of the village of Coxhoe.

The site is an abandoned quarry and exposed to a section of the Ford Formation of Late Permian magnesian limestone. The site is nationally important for an interpretation of the geological history of the Ford Formation carbonates.

The abandoned quarry workings include an area of floristically-rich magnesian limestone grassland, a habitat which is nationally scarce in Britain, with only an estimated 270 hectares (670 acres) remaining.

The site is part of a larger area that is managed by the Durham Wildlife Trust as the Trimdon Grange Quarry nature reserve.

== Land ownership ==
All land within Trimdon Limestone Quarry SSSI is owned by the local authority.
