= Botany Hill =

- Location within County Durham
- Location: MAGiC MaP
- Nearest town: Barnard Castle
- Coordinates: 54°34′48″N 2°4′13″W
- Area: 3.75 ha (9.3 acres)
- Established: 1984
- Governing body: Natural England
- Website: Botany Hill SSSI

Botany Hill, formerly known as Botany Quarry, is a Site of Special Scientific Interest in the Teesdale district of south-west County Durham, England. It occupies a position on both sides of How Gill, just under 1 km north of the village of Hury, in Baldersdale.

The site is important as the type locality of the Botany Limestone, a widespread marker horizon that is key to an understanding of the stratigraphy of the Namurian sediments of the North Pennines and Northumberland Trough.
