= Rigg Farm and Stake Hill Meadows =

Protected area in County Durham, England

- Location within County Durham
- Location: MAGiC MaP
- Nearest town: Middleton-in-Teesdale
- Coordinates: 54°35′50″N 2°6′16″W
- Area: 14.7 ha (36 acres)
- Established: 1989
- Governing body: Natural England
- Website: Rigg Farm and Stake Hill Meadows SSSI

Rigg Farm and Stake Hill Meadows is a Site of Special Scientific Interest in the Teesdale district of County Durham, England. It is situated in Lunedale, on the north side of Grassholme Reservoir, close to the hamlet of Thringarth.

The main interest in the site lies in its traditionally-managed hay meadows, which support a wide variety of grasses, such as common bent, Agrostis capillaris, sweet vernal-grass, Anthoxanthum odoratum, and red fescue, Festuca rubra, and forbs, such as meadowsweet, Filipendula ulmaria, marsh marigold, Caltha palustris, and great burnet, Sanguisorba officinalis.

On wetter ground, the locally rare melancholy thistle, Cirsium helenioides, and globe flower, Trollius europaeus, are found alongside water avens, Geum rivale, marsh hawk's-beard, Crepis paludosa, and tufted forget-me-not, Myosotis laxa.

On steeper banks, which are not cut, a particularly rich flora includes alpine bistort, Polygonum viviparum, common spotted orchid, Dactylorhiza fuchsii, and intermediate lady's-mantle, Alchemilla xanthochlora, among many others.
