= Westernhope Burn Wood =

Woodland in County Durham, England

- Location within County Durham
- Location: MAGiC MaP
- Nearest town: Stanhope, County Durham
- Coordinates: 54°43′45″N 2°6′6″W
- Area: 11.8 ha (29 acres)
- Established: 1976
- Governing body: Natural England
- Website: Westernhope Burn Wood SSSI

Westernhope Burn Wood is a Site of Special Scientific Interest in County Durham, England. It occupies the steeply-incised ravine of the Westernhope Burn, a tributary of the River Wear, which it joins from the south about halfway between the villages of Eastgate and Westgate.

The semi-natural deciduous woodland on the slopes of the ravine area is characteristic of the North Pennines, and this is one of the least disturbed areas of such vegetation in County Durham. Ash, Fraxinus excelsior, and wych elm, Ulmus glabra, are the dominant canopy species; hazel, Corylus avellana, is dominant in the understorey, in which holly, Ilex aquifolium, is also common. Alder, Alnus glutinosa, is the dominant species in wetter areas, next to the burn and in valley-side flushes. The woodland plants on the ground are characteristic of basic soils, and include woodruff, dog's mercury, sanicle, bluebell and giant bellflower. On boulders there is a dense covering of mosses and liverworts.

Part of the woodland is grazed, and here there are common plants of grassland such as ribwort plantain, crested dog’s-tail and creeping buttercup. At the woodland verge there are stands of bracken in places, while elsewhere are areas of acidic grassland with mat grass, heath bedstraw and tormentil; in other areas, where the soil is calcareous, there are glaucous sedge, quaking grass and wild thyme.

On the east side of the valley, the underlying sandstone and limestone is exposed as cliffs; these support a vegetation in which wood sage, Teucrium scorodonia, and foxglove, Digitalis purpurea, are among the commonest species. At the base of the cliffs, there are deposits of tufa, which are covered with bryophytes, especially curled hook-moss, Palustriella commutata, scented liverwort, Conocephalum conicum and Pellia spp.
