= The Bottoms (SSSI) =

Protected area in County Durham, England

- Location within County Durham
- Location: MAGiC MaP
- Nearest city: City of Durham
- Coordinates: 54°44′13″N 1°26′24″W
- Area: 2.15 ha (5.3 acres)
- Established: 1999
- Governing body: Natural England
- Website: The Bottoms SSSI

The Bottoms is a Site of Special Scientific Interest in County Durham, England. It lies just south of the A181 road, roughly midway between the Cassop and Wheatley Hill villages, some 10 km south-east of Durham city.

The site's interest lies in unimproved magnesian limestone grassland, where blue moor-grass, Sesleria albicans, and small scabious, Scabiosa columbaria, are the dominant species. This is a scarce vegetation type found only in County Durham, and the extent of which has been severely reduced by quarrying and intensive agriculture.

Other grasses that are frequent in the sward include meadow oat-grass, Avenula pratensis, quaking grass, Briza media, sheep's fescue, Festuca ovina, crested hairgrass, and Koeleria macrantha. There is a rich variety of herbs, including rock-rose, Helianthemum nummularium, glaucous sedge, Carex flacca, spring sedge, C. caryophyllea, and mouse-ear hawkweed, Pilosella officinarum, and a small population of purple milk-vetch, Astragalus danicus, a local rarity on magnesian limestone.
