= Slit Woods =

Slitt Woods
- Location within County Durham
- Location: MAGiC MaP
- Nearest town: Stanhope
- Coordinates: 54°44′47″N 2°8′48″W
- Area: 14.1 ha (35 acres)
- Established: 1976
- Governing body: Natural England
- Website: Slit Woods SSSI

Slitt Woods is a Site of Special Scientific Interest in the Wear Valley district of County Durham, England. It occupies the valley of Middlehope Burn, a tributary of the River Wear, which it joins at Westgate, just south of the site.

The site has a variety of habitats, including woodland, calcareous grassland, fen, and revegetated mine workings.

The woodland is characterised by ash, Fraxinus excelsior, and wych elm, Ulmus glabra, over an understorey of hazel, Corylus avellana. The ground cover includes great bell-flower, Campanula latifolia, globeflower, Trollius europaeus, wood cranesbill, Geranium sylvaticum, and marsh hawk's-beard, Crepis paludosa.

The site takes in the disused workings of two former lead mines, Slitt Mine and Middlehope Mine. The waste from these mines supports open grassland within which the metallophyte spring sandwort, Minuartia verna, has established itself.
