= Wingate Quarry =

Site of Special Scientific Interest in County Durham, England

- Location within County Durham
- Location: MAGiC MaP
- Nearest town: Ferryhill, County Durham; Peterlee, County Durham
- Coordinates: 54°43′54″N 1°25′17″W
- Area: 23.35 ha (57.7 acres)
- Established: 1984
- Governing body: Natural England
- Website: Wingate Quarry

Wingate Quarry is a biological Site of Special Scientific Interest in the County Durham district of east County Durham, England. Part of the site is also a Local Nature Reserve It is a disused quarry located just south of the village of Wheatley Hill.

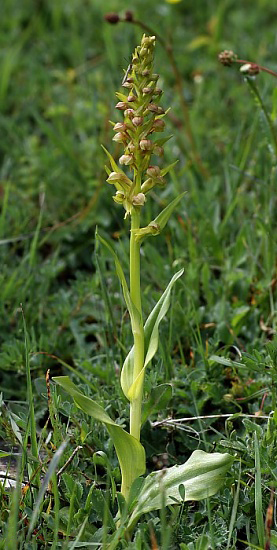
Frog Orchid, Coeloglossum viride

The quarry was worked for Magnesian Limestone until the 1930s, when it closed. Since then a large and varied grassland has developed on the site. Magnesian limestone grassland is nationally scarce, with this site accounting for close to 8 per cent of the national total. As well as species that are characteristic of this vegetation type, there are also two orchids, fragrant orchid, Gymnadenia conopsea, and frog orchid, Coeloglossum viride, both of which are uncommon in County Durham.

== Land ownership ==
All land within Wingate Quarry SSSI is owned by the local authority.
