= Railway Stell West =

Protected area in County Durham, England

- Location within County Durham
- Location: MAGiC MaP
- Nearest town: Newton Aycliffe
- Coordinates: 54°37′43″N 1°30′31″W
- Area: 4.6 ha (11 acres)
- Established: 1986
- Governing body: Natural England
- Website: Railway Stell West SSSI

Railway Stell West is a Site of Special Scientific Interest in County Durham, England. The site consists of a length of ditch alongside the East Coast Main Line railway, 3 km east of the town of Newton Aycliffe.

The area where the site is located was once a large wetland known as Bradbury, Mordon, and Preston Carrs, and the only remaining portion of it is the ditch next to the railroad. There are many different types of wetland habitats, from open water to tall herb communities.

The eastern side of the ditch, which embanks the railway, is formed of railway ballast, over which a dry herb vegetation has developed. The western bank is relatively undisturbed and supports a richer assemblage, in which the locally scarce common meadow rue, Thalictrum flavum, is abundant.

Where the ditch has been recently cleared, there are patches of open water, in which water crowfoot, Ranunculus aquatilis, water plantain, Alisma plantago-aquatica, and similar species are dominant; water violet, Hottonia palustris, which is at its northern limit in Britain at this site, is locally abundant.

Around the open water, and in parts of the ditch that are silting-up, a tall fen vegetation occurs. A wide variety of species occur, including water horsetail, Equisetum fluviatile, celery-leaved crowfoot, Ranunculus sceleratus, sharp-flowered rush, Juncus acutiflorus, and great pond sedge, Carex riparia. Great spearwort, Ranunculus lingua, a rarity in north-east England, is still found, but a number of other uncommon species have been lost in recent years, among them narrow-leaved water-parsnip, Berula erecta, water dropwort, Oenanthe fistulosa, and fringed water-lily, Nymphoides peltata.
