= Mere Beck Meadows =

Ecological region in the Teesdale district of County Durham, England

- Location within County Durham
- Location: MAGiC MaP
- Nearest town: Barnard Castle
- Coordinates: 54°33′47″N 2°4′35″W
- Area: 6.6 ha (16 acres)
- Established: 1989
- Governing body: Natural England
- Website: Mere Beck Meadows SSSI

Mere Beck Meadows, formerly known as Willoughby Hall Meadows, is a Site of Special Scientific Interest in the Teesdale district of County Durham, England. It consists of three hay meadows, situated on the south side of Hury Reservoir, immediately below the Blackton Reservoir dam.

The site is important as preserving a rich assemblage of plant species, in a habitat that has become scarcer due to intensive agricultural practices. A wide variety of flowering plants is found, many in abundance, such as wood cranesbill, Geranium sylvaticum, meadow saxifrage, Saxifraga granulata, melancholy thistle, Cirsium helenioides, and great burnet, Sanguisorba officinalis.
