= Hawthorn Dene =

- Location within County Durham
- Location: MAGiC MaP
- Nearest town: Seaham
- Coordinates: 54°48′20″N 1°19′26″W
- Area: 64.1 ha (158 acres)
- Established: 1968
- Governing body: Natural England
- Website: Hawthorn Dene SSSI

Footbridge in Hawthorn Dene

Hawthorn Dene is a Site of Special Scientific Interest in the County Durham district of County Durham, England. The site occupies the incised valley of Hawthorn Burn and extends from just south of the village of Hawthorn eastward as far as the Durham Coast railway line: the area between the railway line and the sea forms part of the Durham Coast SSSI.

Much of the area consists of semi-natural and relatively undisturbed woodland that has developed on Magnesian Limestone; within Durham, only Castle Eden Dene SSSI has a larger area under this type of vegetation. At the eastern end of the dene, the woodland gives way to magnesian limestone grassland, while at the western end there is an area of tall fen vegetation.

Much of the woodland is dominated by ash, Fraxinus excelsior, but in places wych elm, Ulmus glabra is dominant; such woodland is scarce in Durham. Another notable feature is the occurrence of yew, Taxus baccata, on the lower valley slopes, this being rare in Britain.
