= Cotherstone Moor =

Moorland in County Durham, England

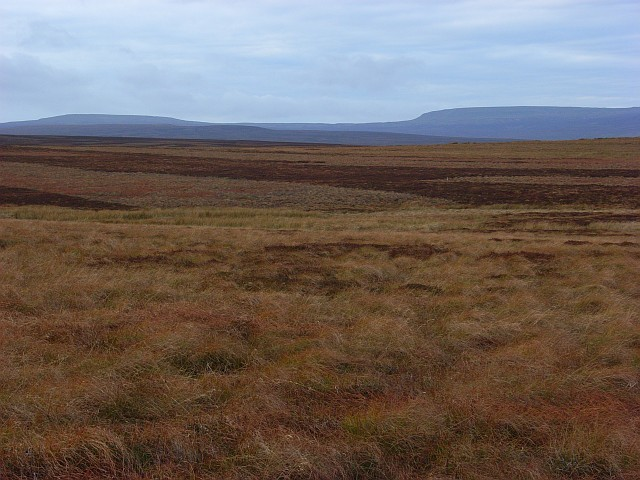
- Moorland of Cotherstone Moor

- Location within County Durham
- Location: MAGiC MaP
- Nearest town: Barnard Castle
- Coordinates: 54°32′55″N 2°5′37″W
- Area: 2,449.45 ha (9.4574 sq mi)
- Established: 1955
- Governing body: Natural England
- Website: Cotherstone Moor SSSI

Cotherstone Moor is a Site of Special Scientific Interest in the Teesdale district in south-west County Durham, England. It is an extensive area of moorland which extends almost the entire length of Baldersdale, from the confluence of the River Balder with the Tees at Cotherstone. It runs parallel to Bowes Moor SSSI, which lies a short distance to the south.

The area includes a variety of upland vegetation types, much of it blanket bog, including one area that is found nowhere else in County Durham and which is unusual for being transitional between northern upland and lowland bogs. Other habitats include dry heath, acid grassland, flushes, and rock and block scree.

The area supports breeding populations of a number of species of birds that are listed in the United Kingdom's Red Data Book (Birds), including four that are listed in Annex 1 of the European Commission's Birds Directive as requiring special protection.

The Pennine Way National Trail passes through the area.
