= Frog Wood Bog =

Protected natural area in County Durham, England

- Location within County Durham
- Location: MAGiC MaP
- Nearest town: Bishop Auckland
- Coordinates: 54°40′6″N 1°53′38″W
- Area: 3.2 ha (7.9 acres)
- Established: 1989
- Governing body: Natural England
- Website: Frog Wood Bog SSSI

Frog Wood Bog is a Site of Special Scientific Interest in the Teesdale district of County Durham, England. It lies alongside Bedburn Beck, approximately 3.5 km west of the village of Bedburn.

The site mainly consists of mire vegetation, of two distinct varieties, one characterised by an abundance of bog mosses, Sphagnum spp, the other dominated by soft rush, Juncus effusus, and hare's-tail cottongrass, Eriophorum vaginatum. There are also areas of grassland and a secondary woodland of downy birch, Betula pubescens, with a groundcover of rush, bog mosses and purple moor-grass, Molinia caerulea. The importance of the site is the mire vegetation, which, of this type, is scarce in County Durham.
