= Shipley and Great Woods =

Protected area in County Durham, England

- Location within County Durham
- Location: MAGiC MaP
- Nearest town: Barnard Castle
- Coordinates: 54°35′11″N 1°59′18″W
- Area: 63.35 ha (156.5 acres)
- Established: 1975 / 1984
- Governing body: Natural England
- Website: Shipley and Great Woods SSSI

Shipley and Great Woods is a Site of Special Scientific Interest in the Teesdale district of south-west County Durham, England. It occupies a steep ravine in the valley of the River Tees, just north of the village of Cotherstone. The woodland growing on the valley slopes, cliffs and screes is one of the most important woodland sites in North-east England, being home to several local plant species and the richest assemblage of woodland lichens in the region.
