= Sherburn Hill =

Village in County Durham, England

Coordinates: 54°46.3′N 1°28.4′W

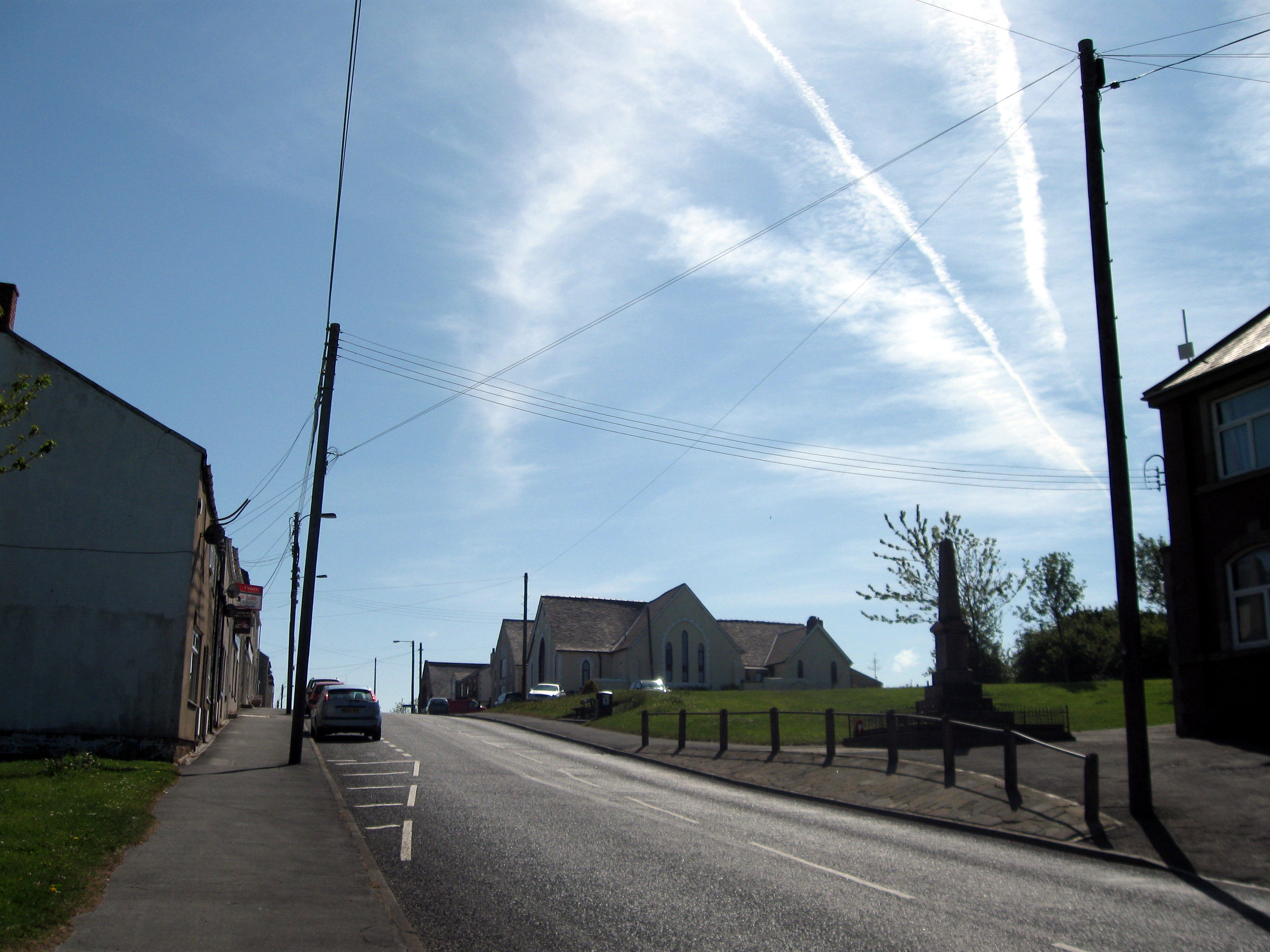
- Front Street, looking east

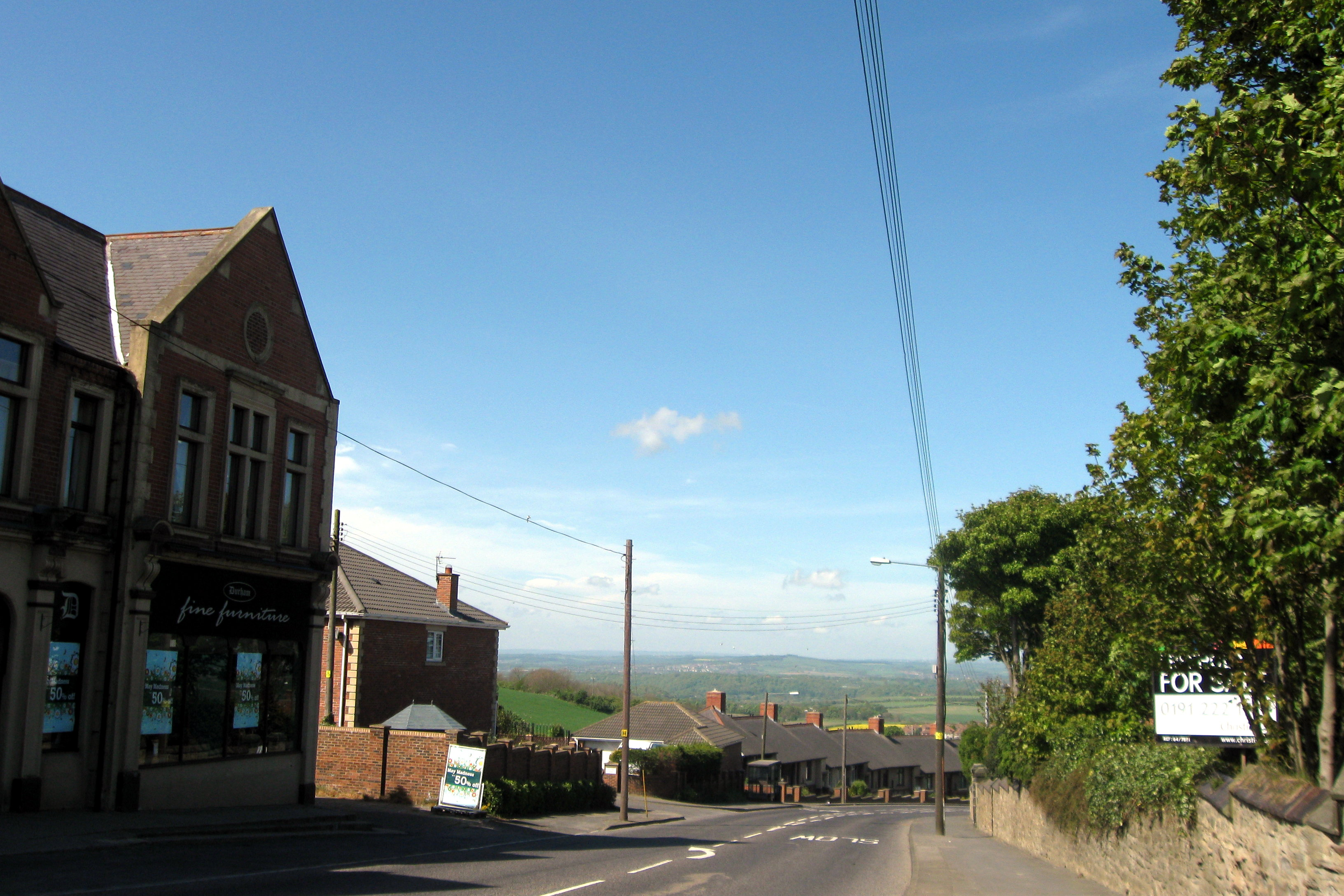
- View to the west downhill towards Sherburn and Durham city
- OS grid reference: NZ335421
- Unitary authority: County Durham
- Ceremonial county: County Durham
- Region: North East
- Country: England
- Sovereign state: United Kingdom
- Dialling code: 0191
- Police: Durham
- Fire: County Durham and Darlington
- Ambulance: North East
- UK Parliament: City of Durham

Sherburn Hill is a village in County Durham, in England. It is situated to the east of Sherburn.

From 1835 to 1965, the Sherburn Hill Colliery operated near the village. In 1851, the Ebenezer Primitive Methodist Church was established in Sherburn Hill. Since the merger with the nearby Bethel Wesleyan Methodist Church in 1968, the church has been called the Sherburn Hill Methodist Church.

Sherburn Hill Colliery opened in 1835, owned then by the Earl of Durham. By the 1890s it was owned by Lambton Collieries Ltd, and the pit employed 300 men and boys, producing 400 tons of coal per day. By 1914 there were 1,260 people employed at the colliery (1,071 working below ground, and 189 on the surface). In 1923 the colliery came under the ownership of Dorman, Long & Co. Ltd. The colliery consistently employed over a thousand people during the 20th century up to 1964. Sherburn Hill Colliery closed on the 7th of August 1965.

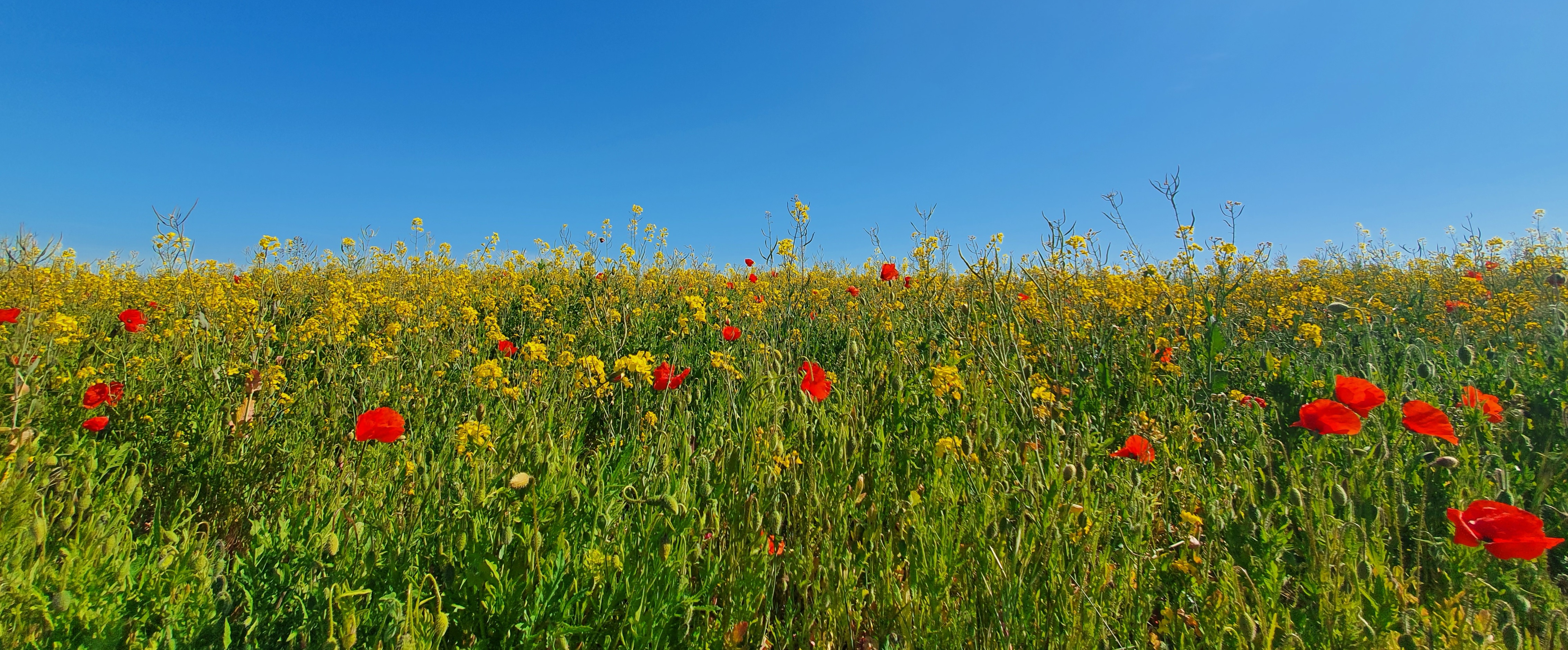
Rapeseed field with Poppies
