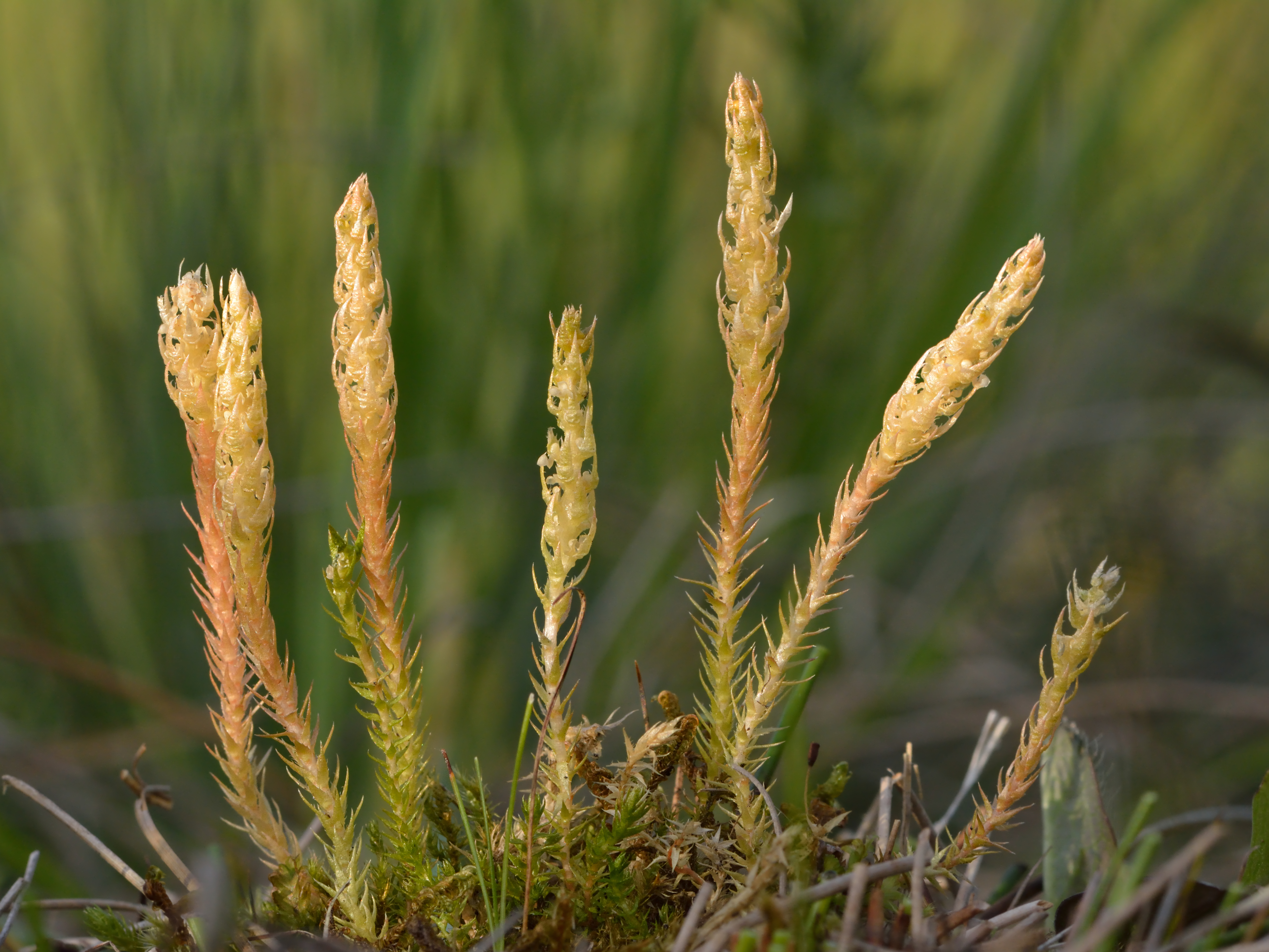

Conservation status
- Secure (NatureServe)

Scientific classification
- Kingdom: Plantae
- Clade: Tracheophytes
- Clade: Lycophytes
- Class: Lycopodiopsida
- Order: Selaginellales
- Family: Selaginellaceae
- Genus: Selaginella
- Species: S. selaginoides

Binomial name
- Selaginella selaginoides (L.) Beauv. ex Mart. & Schrank

= Selaginella selaginoides =

Species of spore-bearing plant

Selaginella selaginoides is a non-flowering plant of the spikemoss genus Selaginella with a wide distribution around the Northern Hemisphere. It resembles a moss in appearance but is a vascular plant belonging to the division Lycopodiophyta. It has a number of common names including lesser clubmoss, club spikemoss, northern spikemoss, low spikemoss and prickly mountain-moss. This plant has one close relative, Selaginella deflexa, native to Hawaii. These two plants form a small clade that is sister to all other Selaginella species.

== Description ==
It is a small, delicate, low-growing plant. Its perennial sterile stems are short, slender and irregularly branched reaching up to 15 cm in length. They creep along the ground but usually turn upwards near the tip. They have small, pointed, triangular leaves about 1–2 mm long, each bearing a ligule on its upper surface near the base.

The plant also produces annual fertile shoots. They are more robust than the sterile stems and stand erect. They are usually 3–6 cm tall and 4–6 mm across but can grow to 10 cm when conditions are favourable. Their leaves are slightly longer than those of the sterile stems and are spirally arranged around the stem, pointing upwards.

The fertile shoots bear stout, yellowish cones which are only slightly differentiated from the branch. The cones usually bear two kinds of sporangia: lobed megasporangia in the lower part of the cone which produce megaspores and simple microsporangia in the upper part which produce many tiny microspores.

== Distribution and habitat ==
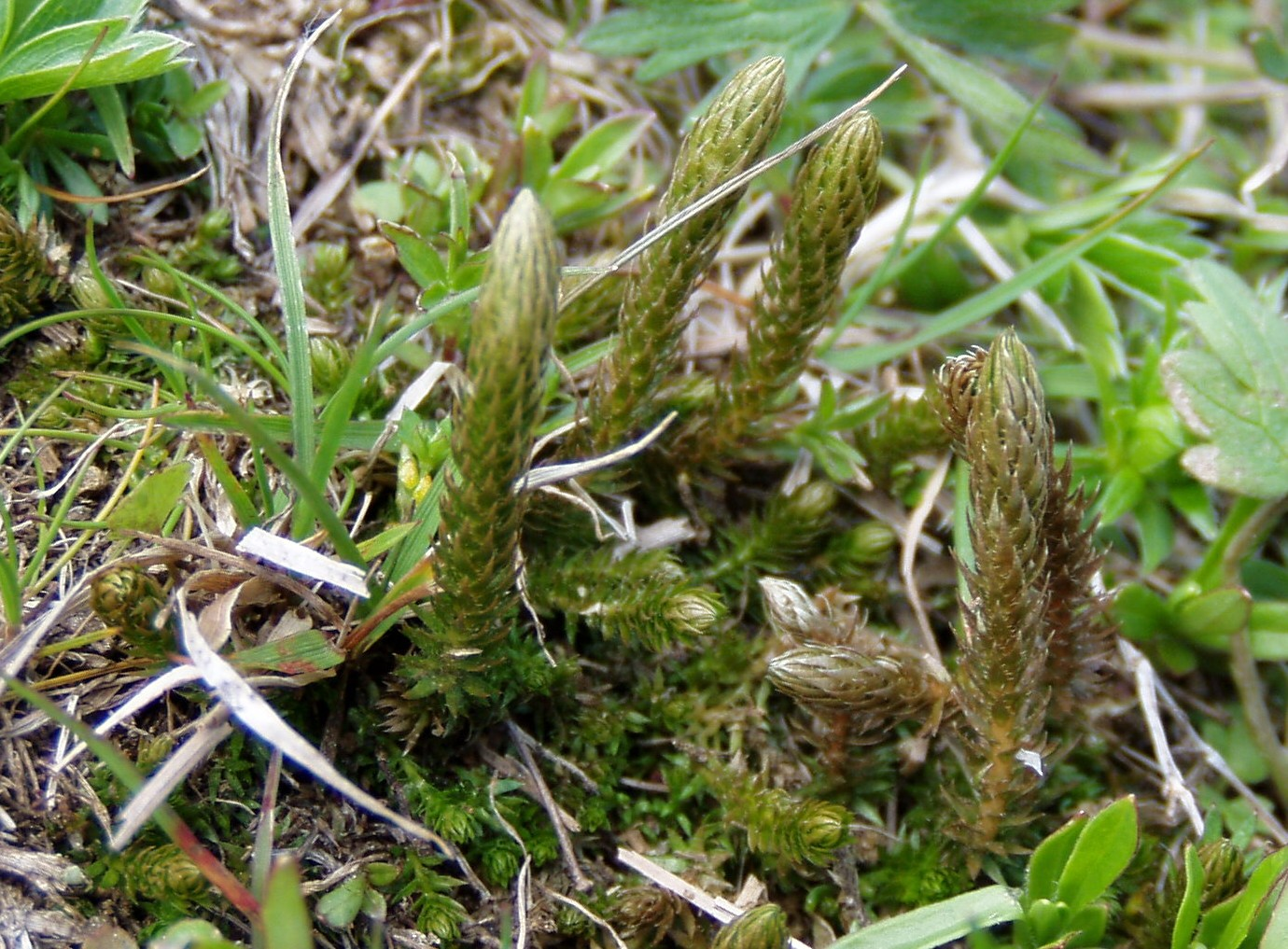
About 1600 metres above sea-level, Rax, Austria

It has a near-circumpolar distribution in the northern hemisphere, including northern parts of Europe, Asia and North America including Greenland, Iceland and the Faroe Islands. In Europe it occurs south to the Pyrenees, Apennines and Caucasus. In Asia it reaches Japan while in North America it occurs south as far as Nevada, Wisconsin, Michigan and Maine.

It is found in damp places with neutral to alkaline soils, most often in mountainous areas. It inhabits bogs, the shores of streams and lakes, wet cliffs and ledges, grassland and dune slacks. It is a poor competitor which does not grow in areas with tall, dense vegetation. In North America it mainly grows from 600 to 2900 m above sea-level, occasionally reaching 3800 m. In Britain it has been recorded from sea-level to 1170 m.

The species is not considered to be globally threatened but has declined in some areas due to drainage and habitat destruction. In Britain and Ireland it had mostly disappeared from lowland areas by 1930, and there is some evidence of range contraction in the uplands as well. The loss of rich fens due to ditch drainage and turning meadows into fields or lawns has caused habitat to disappear in Southern Finland.

== Uses ==
The plant has previously used as a remedy for rickets in Finnish traditional medicine.

== Notes ==
- Flora of North America. Selaginella selaginoides. Accessed 30 July 2008.
- Heidel Bonnie & Handley, Joy (2006) Selaginella selaginoides (L.) Beauv. ex Mart. & Schrank (club spikemoss): A Technical Conservation Assessment. Accessed 30 July 2008.
- Hutchinson, G. (1996) Welsh Ferns, National Museums and Galleries of Wales.
- Page C. N. (1982) The Ferns of Britain and Ireland, Cambridge University Press.
- Preston, C. D. & Pearman, D. A. (2002) New Atlas of the British and Irish Flora, Oxford University Press.
- Stace, Clive A. (1997) New Flora of the British Isles, Cambridge University Press.
- Tutin, T. G. et al. (1964) Flora Europaea, Volume 1. Cambridge University Press.
