= Muggleswick, Stanhope and Edmundbyers Commons and Blanchland Moor =

Protected area in northern England

- Location within County Durham
- Location: MAGiC MaP
- Nearest town: Stanhope
- Coordinates: 54°49′N 2°0′W
- Area: 9,118.12 ha (35.2053 sq mi)
- Established: 1997
- Governing body: Natural England
- Website: Muggleswick, Stanhope and Edmundbyers Commons and Blanchland Moor SSSI

Muggleswick, Stanhope and Edmundbyers Commons and Blanchland Moor is a Site of Special Scientific Interest in County Durham and Northumberland, England. It consists of two separate areas, the larger—encompassing the upland areas of Muggleswick, Stanhope and Edmundbyers Commons—in the Derwentside and Wear Valley districts of north Durham, the smaller—Blanchland Moor—in the Tynedale district of south-west Northumberland.

The site has one of the most extensive areas of dry heath in northern England. There are also areas of wet heath, acid grassland, flushes, relict juniper woodland and small areas of open water.

== Flora and fauna ==
The dry heath is dominated by heather, Calluna vulgaris, and wavy hair-grass, Deschampsia flexuosa; the regionally rare bearberry, Arctostaphylos uva-ursi, is found on the higher parts of Blanchland Moor. Other noteworthy plants are the nationally scarce pale forget-me-not, Myosotis stolonifera, and the regionally rare round-leaved crowfoot, Ranunculus omiophyllus, and ivy-leaved bellflower, Wahlenbergia hederacea, all of which occur in the vicinity of streams, and the nationally scarce spring sandwort, Minuartia verna, one of a number of metallophytes that occur on old spoil heaps around disused lead-mines on Stanhope Common.

== Ornithology ==
As with the rest of the North Pennines moorlands, of which these areas form part, the site is home to nationally important breeding populations of a number of birds. Three species—merlin, Eurasian golden plover and short-eared owl—are listed in Annex 1 of the European Commission's Birds Directive as requiring special protection; the high density of merlin is particularly noteworthy. Other breeding species include red grouse, Eurasian curlew, common redshank, common snipe and dunlin, which are listed in the United Kingdom's Red Data Book (Birds).
