= Easington District =

Former local government district in England

Coordinates: 54.790°N 1.352°W

- Shown within ceremonial County Durham
- History
  - Origin: Easington Rural District; Seaham Urban District
  - Created: 1974
  - Abolished: 2009
  - Succeeded by: County Durham
- Status: District
- ONS code: 20UF
- Government: Easington District Council
  - HQ: Easington

Easington was, from 1974 to 2009, a local government district in eastern County Durham, England. It contained the settlements of Easington, Seaham, Peterlee, Murton, Horden, Blackhall Colliery, Wingate and Castle Eden. It did not however include Easington Lane which is administered as part of the City of Sunderland.

The district was formed on 1 April 1974 by the merger of Seaham urban district with most of Easington Rural District.

It had the lowest percentage of foreign-born residents in England at 1.2% (2001 census).

The district was abolished as part of the 2009 structural changes to local government in England. An electoral ward in the name of Easington still exists. The population of this ward taken at the 2011 census was 7,693.

== Electoral divisions ==
- Blackhalls Blackhalls ward; Nesbitt parish; Sheraton with Hulam parish; Hutton Henry and Station Town parish wards of Hutton Henry parish; Hesleden parish ward of Monk Hesleden parish
- Dawdon Dawdon ward; Seaham Harbour South parish ward of Seaham parish
- Deneside Deneside ward; Westlea parish ward of Seaham parish
- Easington Easington Colliery ward; Easington Village parish; Hawthorn parish
- Horden Horden North ward; Horden South ward
- Murton Murton East ward; Murton West ward
- Peterlee East Dene House ward; Eden Hill ward
- Peterlee West Acre Rigg ward; Howletch ward
- Seaham Seaton with Slingley parish; Seaham Harbour North and Seaham North parish wards of Seaham parish
- Shotton Haswell and Shotton ward; South Hetton parish
- Thornley Thornley and Wheatley Hill ward; Trimdon Foundry parish
- Wingate Passfield ward; Castle Eden parish; Wingate parish
