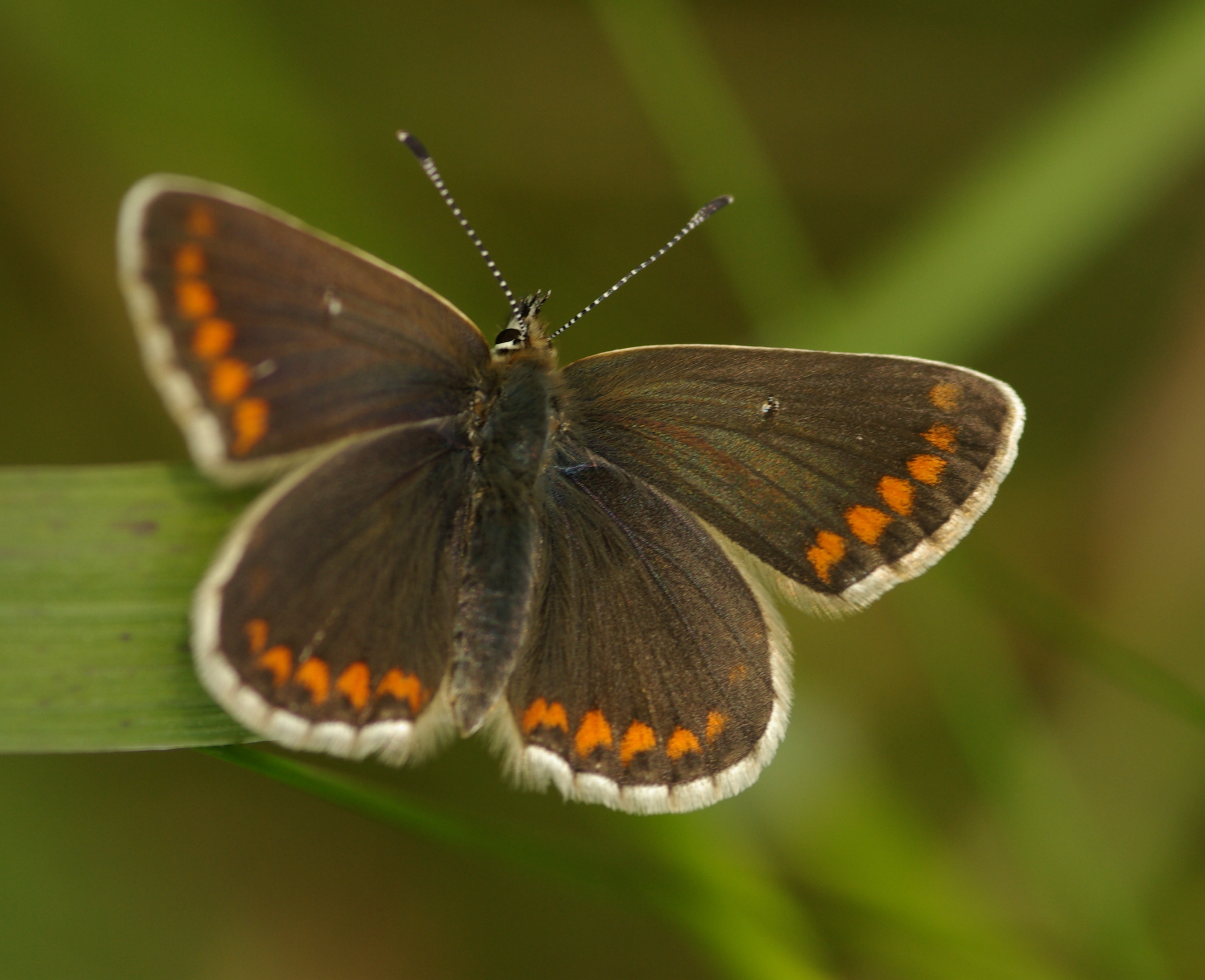

Scientific classification
- Domain: Eukaryota
- Kingdom: Animalia
- Phylum: Arthropoda
- Class: Insecta
- Order: Lepidoptera
- Family: Lycaenidae
- Genus: Aricia
- Species: A. artaxerxes

Binomial name
- Aricia artaxerxes (Fabricius, 1775)

Synonyms
- Plebeius artaxerxes

= Northern brown argus =

Species of butterfly

The northern brown argus (Aricia artaxerxes) is a butterfly in the family Lycaenidae. It is found throughout much of the Palearctic realm.

== Subspecies ==
- A. a. allous (Geyer, [1836]) Alps, northern Europe
- A. a. hakutozana (Matsumura, 1927) North Korea
- A. a. horkei Høegh-Guldberg, 1973 Öland & Gotland, Sweden
- A. a. inhonora Jachontov, 1909 "Rossia [Russia]centrali et orientali"
- A. a. lyngensis Høegh-Guldberg, 1966 Scandinavia
- A. a. lepsinskana (Obraztsov, 1935) Dzhungarsky Alatau
- A. a. mandzhuriana (Obraztsov, 1935) eastern Amur, Ussuri
- A. a. opheimi Høegh-Guldberg, 1966 southern Norway
- A. a. rambringi Høegh-Guldberg, 1966 Scandinavia
- A. a. sachalinensis (Matsumura, 1919) Sakhalin
- A. a. sarmatis (Grum-Grshimailo, 1890) southern Urals
- A. a. scytissa Nekrutenko, 1985 Tian-Shan
- A. a. sheljuzhkoi (Obraztsov, 1935) Caucasus Major
- A. a. strandi (Obraztsov, 1935) Altai – western Amur
- A. a. transalaica (Obratzov, 1935) Ghissar, Darvaz, Pamirs-Alai, Himalayas
- A. a. turgaica (Obraztsov, 1935) south-west Siberia
- A. a. ukrainica (Obraztsov, 1936) south-east Europe
- A. a. vandalica Kaaber & Høegh-Guldberg, 1961 Jutland, Denmark

== Appearance, behaviour and distribution (Great Britain) ==
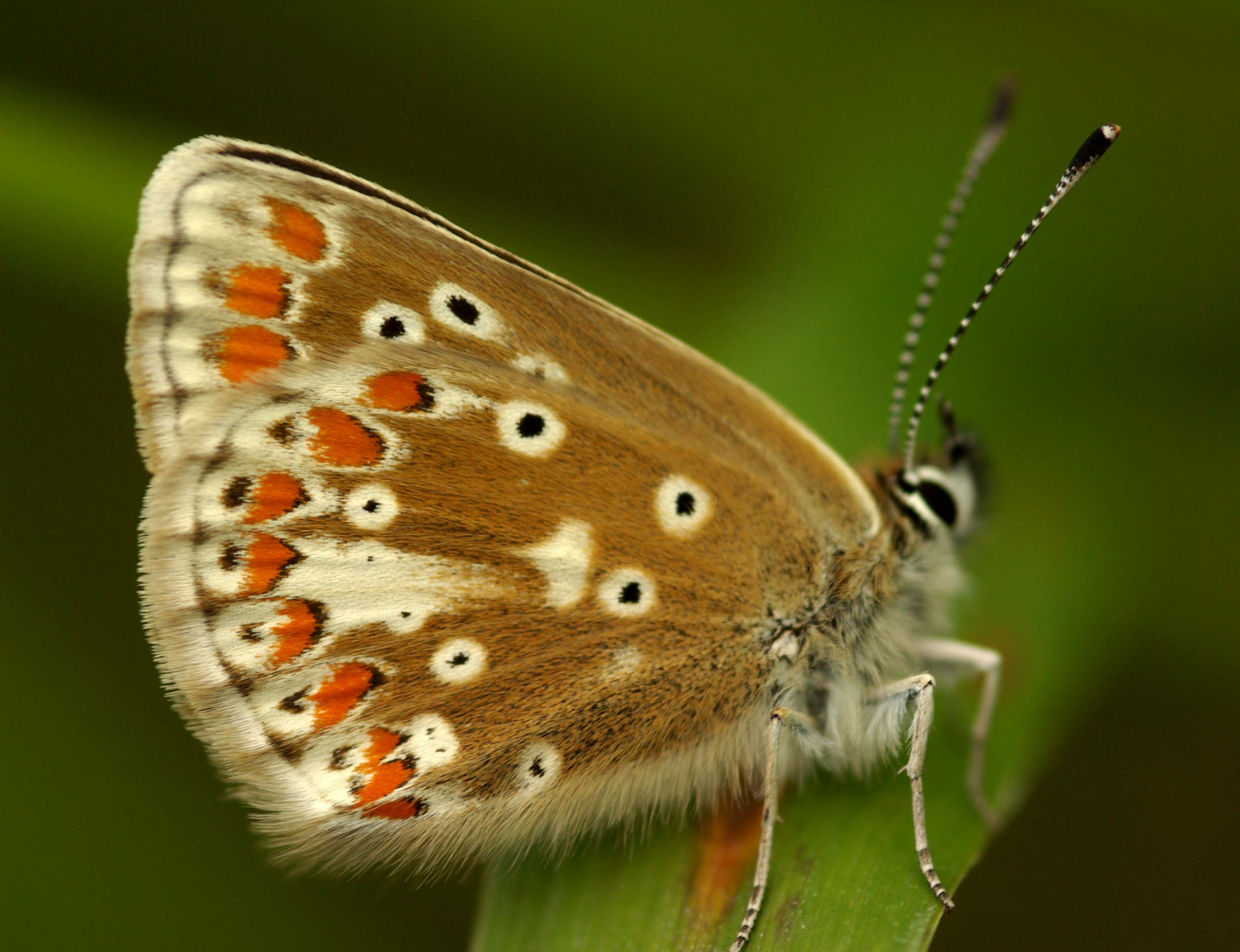
Aricia artaxerxes in northern England showing underwing pattern

This species has confused British entomologists for years. Since its discovery in Britain it has been thought to be a form or a subspecies of the brown argus (Aricia agestis) and as well as a species in its own right. Since 1967 all brown arguses in the north of England and Scotland have been classified as this species. In the last few years genetic studies have shown that some of the colonies along the border of the two species ranges are still being wrongly classified and some colonies in the north of England are now thought to be A. agestis. So far as is known their ranges do not overlap in the UK. The Scottish form is visually quite distinct from the brown argus. It usually has a small white dot in the centre of the upperside forewing and the black spots on the underside are missing leaving larger white spots on the light brown background. The northern English populations belong to a form called salmacis (called the Durham argus in English) and are very similar to the brown argus including the presence of black spots on the under-wing (see photo) hence all the confusion. In Europe where it is known as the mountain argus, it is widespread in Scandinavia and mountainous regions of central, southern and eastern Europe. The species is considered locally rare in Britain, and the UK has established a detailed Biodiversity Action Plan to conserve this species along with a small number of other butterfly species.

== Life cycle and food plants ==
Note that information on this species applies to Great Britain and some details may not be consistent with the species in other parts of its range.

Eggs are laid singly on the upperside of the food plant leaves. As far is known common rock-rose (Helianthemum nummularium) seems to be the sole food plant in Britain. The larvae hibernate while still quite small and continue to feed and grow the following spring. Like the brown argus, it is attractive to ants and often attended by them. Pupation takes place at ground level in late May and butterflies are on the wing from mid-June to mid-July.

== See also ==
- List of butterflies of Great Britain
- Fowlsheugh
