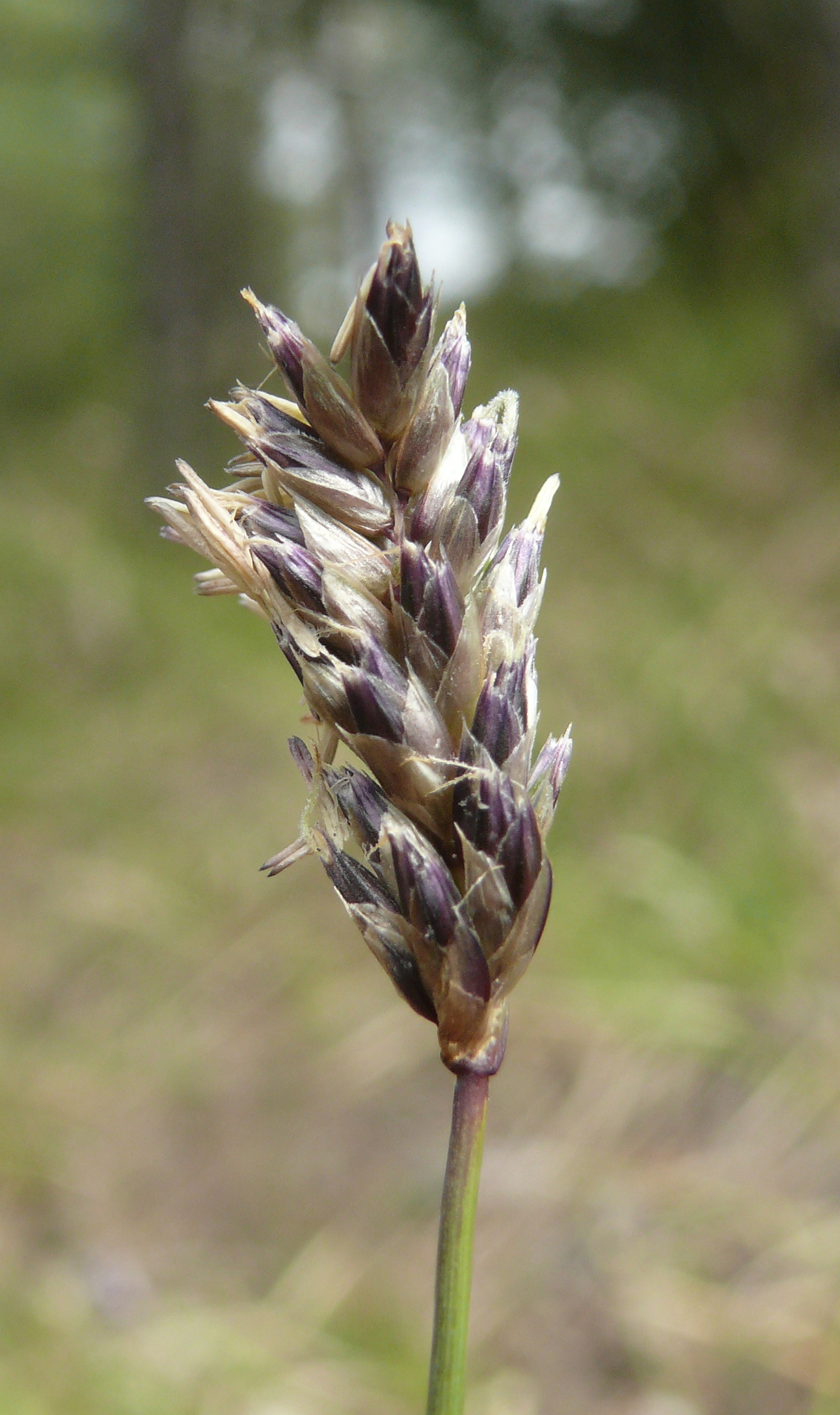
- Sesleria albicans inflorescence

Scientific classification
- Kingdom: Plantae
- Clade: Tracheophytes
- Clade: Angiosperms
- Clade: Monocots
- Clade: Commelinids
- Order: Poales
- Family: Poaceae
- Subfamily: Pooideae
- Genus: Sesleria
- Species: S. albicans

Binomial name
- Sesleria albicans Deyl.

= Sesleria albicans =

Species of grass

Sesleria albicans is a species of perennial grass in the family Poaceae which can be found throughout Europe.

== Description ==
The species is perennial and caespitose with erect and slender culms that are 10–45 centimetres (3.9–17.7 in) long. It have a ligule that goes around the ciliolate membrane and is 0.2–0.4 millimetres (0.0079–0.0157 in) long. Leaf-blades are flat and are 10–25 centimetres (3.9–9.8 in) long and 1.5–3 millimetres (0.059–0.118 in) wide. The panicle is capitated, oblong, ovate and inflorescenced with a diameter being 1–3 centimetres (0.39–1.18 in) by 0.5–0.7 centimetres (0.20–0.28 in). Spikelets are oblong, solitary, and are 4–7 millimetres (0.16–0.28 in) long with pedicelled fertile ones. Sterile spikelets grow in pairs and carry 2–3 fertile florets. Both upper and lower glumes are 4–7 millimetres (0.16–0.28 in) long and are also ovate, membranous, glaucous, with a single keel and vein, and with acuminated and muticous apexes. Fertile lemma is ovate, membranous, and is 4–6 millimetres (0.16–0.24 in) long. Flowers have three stamens, two stigmas, and are hairy. The fruits have caryopses which have an additional pericarp, a hairy apex, and elliptic hilum.
