= Scheduled monuments in County Durham =

List of protected ancient monuments in County Durham, England

There are 292 scheduled monuments in County Durham, in North East England. These protected sites date from the Neolithic period in some cases and include barrows, a medieval hospital, ancient Roman sites, castle ruins, Iron Age forts, bridges and Anglo-Saxon crosses. In the United Kingdom, the scheduling of monuments was first initiated to ensure the preservation of "nationally important" archaeological sites or historic buildings. Protection is given to scheduled monuments under the Ancient Monuments and Archaeological Areas Act 1979.

== Notable scheduled monuments in County Durham ==
Image	Name	Location	Date	Notes
	Barnard Castle	The market town called Barnard Castle	early 12th century AD	In 1474, Richard, Duke of Gloucester (later Richard III became lord of the castle by right of his wife, Anne Neville. It was of his favourite residences.
	Binchester Roman Fort	Bishop Auckland	79AD	The fort was established to guard the crossing of the River Wear by Dere Street, the main Roman road between York, Hadrian's Wall and Scotland.
	Bowes Castle	Bowes	12th century AD	Built on the site of the former Roman fort of Lavatrae. Bowes is the first of three Norman castles on the Stainmore Pass.
	Causey Arch	Stanley	1727 AD	The oldest surviving single-arch railway bridge in the world.
	Chester New Bridge	Bournmoor		A grade II listed medieval stone bridge over the River Wear.
	Concangis	Chester-le-Street		Much of the fort is beneath the town of Chester-le-Street so little remains to be seen except for a portion of the excavated officers’ quarters left on display.
	Cotherstone Castle	Cotherstone	1090 AD	The remains include an earth mound, a ruined wall fragment and traces of a probable fishpond.
	Dalden Tower	Dalton-le-Dale	12th century AD	A manor house built in the 12th century and later a pele tower added during the 16th century. Only ruins survive today.
	Elvet Bridge	Durham	1160 AD	A medieval masonry arch bridge across the River Wear connecting The Bailey and Elvet.
	Framwellgate Bridge	Durham	after 1400 AD	A medieval masonry arch bridge across the River Wear.
	Greta Bridge	The hamlet called Greta Bridge	1773 AD	The current bridge was built in 1773 to replace the one destroyed by the Great Flood of 1771.
	Kepier Hospital	Kepier	1112 AD	Originally known as the Hospital of St Giles, established as an almshouse for old men in 1112 AD.
	Lavatrae	Bowes	early 70s AD	Only earthworks and the parts of the stone walls of the bathhouse survive in the 21st century. The medieval Bowes Castle was built within the perimeter of the fort.
	Legs Cross	Bolam	9th century AD	An Anglo-Saxon cross with interlaced patterning.
	Longovicium	Lanchester	2nd century AD	Most of what is known about the site has been determined from studying the large number of altars, dedication slabs and a milestone dedicated to emperor Gordian III uncovered half a mile away from the fort.
	Ludworth Tower	Ludworth	1411 AD	A manor house and later pele tower. Only ruins survive today.
	Maglona	Greta Bridge	between 1st century AD and 3rd century AD	Built to protect the Watling Street crossing of the River Greta.
	Maiden Castle	Durham	Iron Age	Promontory fort with remains of earthworks, covering a 2-acre (0.81 ha) hill top site near Durham city centre.
	Maiden's Bower	Durham	Bronze Age	A bronze age burial mound on which a cross once stood to commemorate the Battle of Neville's Cross.
	Neville's Cross	The suburb called Neville's Cross	1346 AD	To commemorate the Battle of Neville's Cross Ralph Neville, 2nd Baron Neville de Raby erected a lavish monument to the south of the battlefield.
	Prebends Bridge	Durham	1772 AD	Built in 1772 to replace a temporary bridge built after the footbridge built in 1574 was swept away in the Great Flood of 1771.
	Rey Cross	Stainmore		Believed to have been ten feet tall, a long-held local legend states it was the burial place of Eric Bloodaxe, Viking Ruler of Northumbria However, Norman Davies posits that it was a "boundary stone . . . halfway between Penrith and Barnard Castle.".
	Sunderland Bridge	The village called Sunderland Bridge	14th century AD	A grade I listed bridge which has undergone several rebuilds.

== See also ==
- List of scheduled monuments
- List of World Heritage Sites in the United Kingdom
