= Royal Air Force station =

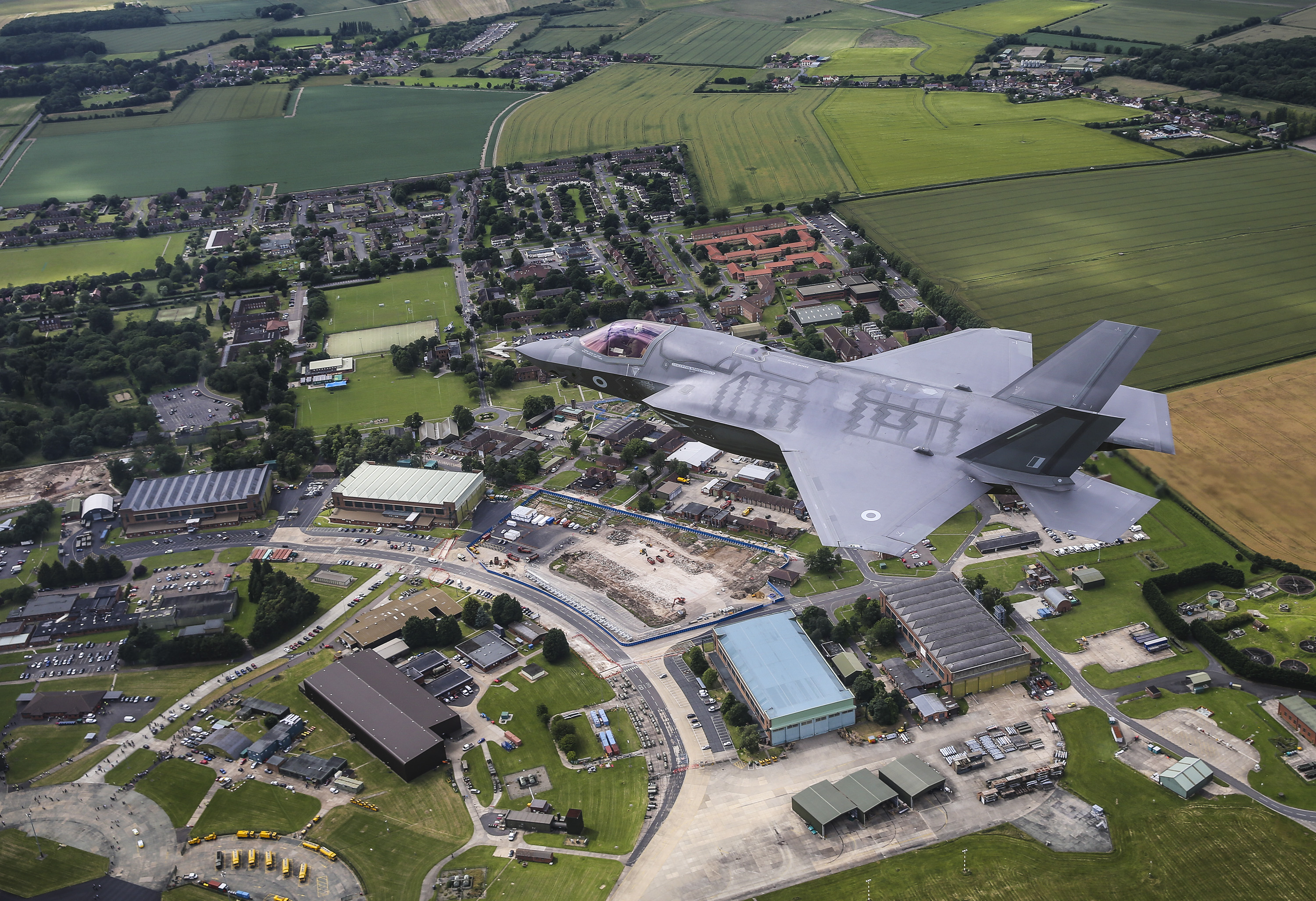
An F-35B Lightning over RAF Marham. The technical site is under the aircraft, with the domestic and staff blocks in the distance.

A Royal Air Force station is a permanent Royal Air Force operations location. An RAF station houses personnel who work within the Royal Air Force to deliver its outputs as per its mission statement. Traditionally recognised for its Airpower contingent, the RAF also has many support stations, not all with airfields or runways that can accommodate aircraft. Some radar stations are designated as Remote radar heads (RRH) as they are operated from other bases with only a skeleton staff on site. Bases that the RAF have owned and operated can be labelled as airfields, relief landing grounds, satellite stations, support stations, radar bases (or latterly, remote radar heads), training establishments, seaplane bases, bombing ranges, ammunition dumps, communication bases and RAF Hospitals.

A handful of extant bases date from the First World War era, but most are from the expansion period of the RAF (the 1930s), (Note: The Expansion Period for the RAF has been deemed to have started in 1934.) or were built in the Second World War. Some stations were reactivated for a different purpose than what was originally intended, such as RAF Harrington, which was an airfield in the Second World War, then in the 1950s became a missile-launching site.

== History ==
The inception of the Royal Air Force on 1 April 1918, saw it inherit real estate from the Royal Flying Corps and the Royal Naval Air Service. Many First World War era aerodromes in Britain were located on, or very near to racecourses (Beverley, Doncaster, Redcar, and Ripon in Yorkshire alone). By the outbreak of the Second World War in 1939, the RAF had bases built and retained during the First World War, expansion bases developed throughout the 1930s, relief landing grounds, seaplane bases inherited from the RNAS, municipal airfields commandeered for wartime use (such as RAF Gatwick, RAF Yeadon), and reactivated bases abandoned after the First World War.

The expansion programme (or expansion period), refers to the decade of the 1930s when it was recognised that the RAF in its then form, would be poorly equipped to deal with hostile activity from a resurgent German Luftwaffe. Several programmes of either upgrading, or more importantly, the creation of new aerodromes, were implemented, with the commensurate number of aircraft and personnel to fulfil the expansion programme. By 1935, this had resulted in an increase of £3,089,000 in spending, to a total amount of £20,650,000. At the peak of operations in the Second World War, military airfields in the United Kingdom numbered more than 550, although most were utilised by the RAF, others may have been within the remit of other aviation sectors (such as the USAAF, the Fleet Air Arm, and the Army Air Corps), which led to one historical report being named as "Nine Thousand Miles of Concrete" as a way of expressing the measurement collectively of the concrete runways.

Due to the threat mostly emanating from Northern Europe, RAF bases were clustered along the East Coast of England, from Kent, through Essex, Suffolk, Norfolk, Lincolnshire, and northwards into Yorkshire and the North East. Bases in the extreme south west, and the northern parts of Scotland were predominantly given over to maritime taskings.

== Physical layout ==
RAF stations with airfields are classified as flying stations and those which have active non-training squadrons being designated as operational. Other sites without aircraft runways or landing areas were considered as non-flying. During the Second World War, the RAF had 59 distinct different variations on station layout and design dependant on the station's functionality. In the late 20th/early 21st centuries, RAF bases took on the acronym of MOB, FOB etc (Main Operating Base, Forward Operating Base), with operational airfields and main bases being designated at sites such as RAF Coningsby and RAF Marham, with other sites, such as RAF Leeming being deemed as support or training sites. RAF stations typically have a fenced perimeter, and flying stations have the airfield - with its runways, perimeter track, dispersal areas, hangars, technical buildings, offices and accommodation for personnel who live on the unit. Flying stations are typically in remote or rural areas, and are geographically quite large in area.

=== Operational Airfield ===
A diagram of RAF Dishforth circa 1950, not to scale. The A1 road is on the western side, and this shows the layout of the airfield in the shape of an 'A', which was common in expansion era airfields of the Royal Air Force.

Airfields and other stations developed mostly ad-hoc until the expansion period of the 1930s. During the period leading up to, and immediately into the Second World War, a station would follow a similar layout but would be orientated in different ways due to local topography, or would have different building designs due to the nature on training or work undertaken there. Most expansion period stations would be furnished with an "A" type airfield, usually with the longest runway on a west/east axis, as this was mostly the way the prevailing wind blew. An exception to this, for example, would be RAF Leeming in North Yorkshire, which was sandwiched between the Great North Road to the west, Bedale Beck to the north, and the River Swale to the east, so the longest runway here runs north/south. RAF Dishforth was similarly constrained; the main runway was on a north-west to south-east alignment. Although a runway-building programme had been initiated before the outbreak of war, many of the flying stations still used grassed areas for taking-off and landing. For example; the Dambusters Raid of 1943 saw No. 617 Squadron taking off from Scampton on a grassed field.

An "A" Type airfield consisted of three intersecting runways, the longest expected to be 2,000 yards (1,800 m) long, with the other two being at least 1,400 yards (1,300 m) and each nominally with a width of 50 yards (46 m). As most airfields retained after the Second World War were of the "A" Type, this was the usual layout of each station, a notable exception would be RAF Mount Pleasant on East Falkland which was opened in 1985, and consists of two runways, one on a west/east axis, and the other intersecting the main runway at the eastern end on a south-west to north-east axis.

A typical expansion era station would have four to five hangars in an arc facing the runways and perimeter tracks, the technical sites behind the hangars, areas for messing, drill and accommodation beyond that, and the station headquarters (SHQ) opposite, or adjacent to, the main entrance. The clustered buildings nestled together as designed in the pre-Second World War base was described as being like a "large village".

Some airfields were re-purposed for other tasks; in the 1950s, several old airfields were reactivated as part of the Thor programme. An example of this is RAF Harrington in Northamptonshire which had been used in the Second World War by both the USAAF and the RAF, later becoming a satellite station to RAF North Luffenham under the Thor programme. Whilst this was closed down in 1963, the remains of the missile launchers survived and were grade II listed in 2011.

=== Other landing grounds ===
Broadly speaking, these fall into three categories; satellite landing ground, a relief landing ground, and a scatter airfield (or satellite station). The idea of a relief landing ground (RLG) developed during wartime when aerodromes were necessary for training and the available space to practice landing and taking-off in aircraft became paramount. An RLG did not have the same amount of effort put into it as a standard aircraft operating base, with less attention paid towards the built estate and drainage. This carried on after the war, with the various elementary flying schools needing RLGs, such as RAF Mona for RAF Valley, and RAF Dishforth and RAF Church Fenton for RAF Linton-on-Ouse. After the cessation of flying training at RAF Church Fenton in 1994, it became an RLG for flights from nearby RAF Linton-on-Ouse. It was designated as an Enhanced Relief Landing Ground until the station was closed completely in 2013. Another acronym, ELG, stood for Emergency Landing Ground, which could something as simple as any flat grassed area near to an existing airfield; Sway in Hampshire provided an ELG for RAF Christchurch and also served as a decoy site.

Relief landing grounds for airships and balloon detachments were known as mooring-out points. Again, these sites would consist mainly of an open area with a concrete stanchion to anchor the airship or balloons. Space could be given over for tentage, but the main reason was to spread out assets in case of bombardment by enemy forces so that all equipment was not in the same area at the same time.

Satellite landing grounds (not to be confused with satellite stations) were sites that were used either for aircraft maintenance or for the storage of airframes. All were on the western side of Britain, away from the range of most enemy aircraft. Typically, the base would have been a large parkland or country estate requisitioned into service and possessed a small complement of hangars.

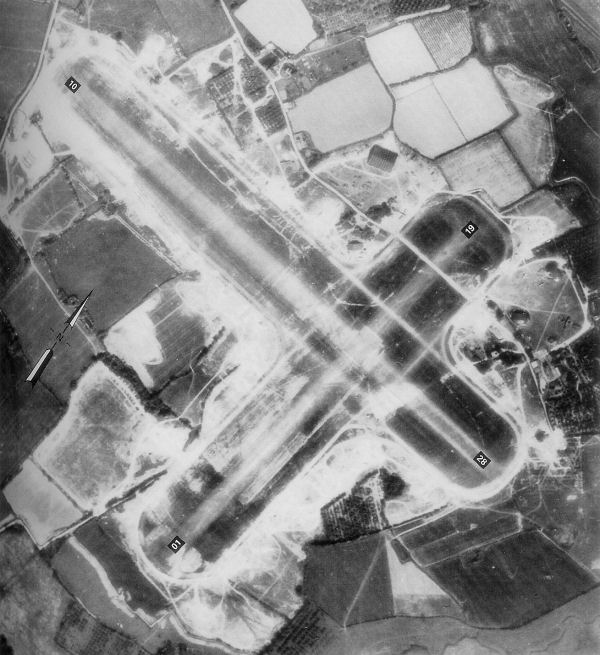
RAF Staplehurst ALG

A satellite station was a dispersal airfield where aircraft could be flown to and thus, the squadrons assets were spread out and not contained all in one area in case of aerial attack. Initially, the satellite airfield was used this way, but it also became a good way of easing overcrowding on bases. In 1939, upon the outbreak of war, the Wellingtons of No. 115 Squadron based at RAF Marham were dispersed to the satellite/scatter airfield of RAF Barton Bendish (described by one writer as "rudimentary"), as per the Bomber Command Scatter Plan, hence the name of Scatter Airfield. A scatter airfield is not be confused with the term scatter station, which was applied to such sites as RAF Stenigot in Lincolnshire which was part of the tropospheric scatter system.

An Advanced Landing Ground (ALG) was a temporary airfield which was pressed into action for a certain operation or necessity which often had very little in the way of facilities and crews would live in tents rather than buildings. RAF Needs Oar Point was one such ground, which by the time of its full development in the spring of 1944, it had two Somerfield track runways and accommodation for over a 1,000 men in tents. By the time of Operation Overlord, the aircraft had moved on and the airfield was not used again, being officially de-requisitioned in December 1944.

=== Support base ===
A support base is one where usually, there are no flying operations, though ostensibly, most military bases have helicopter landing areas. Support bases usually provide training, as opposed to RAF Fylingdales, as an example, which has no flying activity but monitors airspace for missile launches and outer space for space junk. The most numerous support bases without flying facilities are the Remote Radar Heads (RRH) and communication bases dotted around the United Kingdom. Some of these smaller bases did not have the resources for pay, medical, or dental facilities, and so would be 'parented' by a larger station, most commonly the nearest main station, although this might not have always been the case. When RAF Staxton Wold was in the process of being decommissioned in 1945, it was parented by RAF Sutton Bridge (Norfolk), and then later RAF Henlow (Bedfordshire). Many of the smaller sites, especially those with a radar or communications role, would have accommodation offsite; the married quarters for those serving at RAF Fylingdales is a small estate in Whitby.

Many support training or administrative stations, were grand houses on large estates that were requisitioned during wartime; Belton Park (an RAF Regiment training depot), Beningbrough Hall as an accommodation site for RCAF personnel from RAF Linton on Ouse, Bawtry Hall, which served as the HQ for No. 1 Group into the 1980s, and Brampton Park in Cambridgeshire which became RAF Brampton and housed many non-flying air activities. Other support bases include the bunkers at Uxbridge, Bentley Priory and at RAF High Wycombe. Uxbridge and Bentley Priory were notable for being the command centres during the Battle of Britain, whereas High Wycombe's newer bunker was opened in 1988 at a cost of £80 million (equivalent to £222,718,000 in 2025) to serve as a CAOC (Combined Air Operations Centre).

=== Marine branch ===
Marine Craft Unit bases operated launches to provide Air-Sea Rescue (ASR) to aircrews who had to bale out into, or find themselves, in the sea. The MCU was established in 1918, and finally disbanded in 1986, when the ASR function was completely superseded by helicopters. The other remaining function of target-setting in areas of open water used as target practise, was converted into a civilian role.

=== Seaplane bases ===
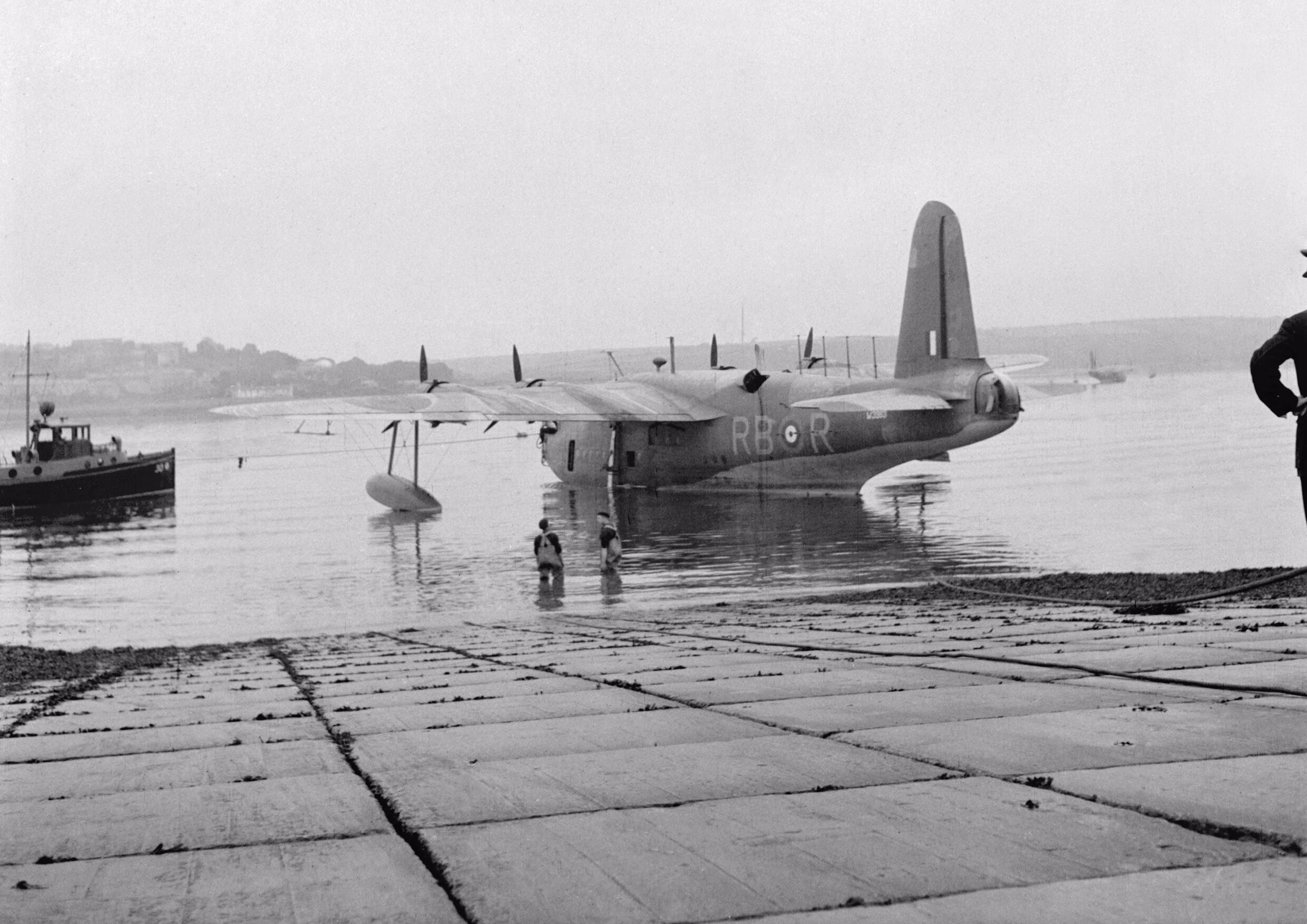
Sunderland II of No 10 Squadron RAAF, about to be brought out of the water at Pembroke Dock

Seaplane bases would vary in size and structure, but for the most part, the permanent and larger sections would at least have a slipway for hauling aircraft out of the water to enable maintenance, with hangarage behind a concrete aircraft standing area. Some bases, such as Mount Batten, also had a mole. RAF Felixstowe was developed in the 1920s, and apart from a few buildings added in the early 1930s, it remained unchanged which prompted some to view the site as "ancient" by the start of the Second World War. It too had hangars and slipways facing directly out onto the water, but not seawards - the water was the Orwell/Stour estuary.

=== Others ===
RAF Hospitals were built to maintain the fighting fitness of RAF personnel; some were located on existing sites (RAF Hospital Halton), or sometimes, they were built on a self-contained site away from RAF bases (RAF Hospital Ely).

Ammunition parks, or bomb dumps, were places where ordnance was stored away from the main operating bases during the Second World War and during the Cold War. Types included locations built specifically to store ammunition, such as RAF Brafferton and RAF Bowes Moor in North Yorkshire, and RAF Chilmark in Wiltshire. Others were existing sites which were used temporarily such as Jervaulx Abbey in North Yorkshire. The most notable example of a bomb dump was RAF Fauld in Staffordshire, which suffered a massive explosion in 1944 killing at least 70 people, and was the largest non-nuclear explosion on British soil.

Bombing ranges were previously operated by the RAF, but are now run by Defence Infrastructure Organisation (DIO).

== Organisational layout ==
During the Second World War, stations were organised by a local or ad-hoc method, and upon mass demobilisation after the Second World War, experiments in the processes of output at RAF bases were undertaken at RAF Tuddenham and RAF Benson. From this emerged a standard three-wing station structure, so that a typical flying station would be sub-divided into three wings;

- Flying Wing - the Flying Wing would be commanded by a wing commander and would carry out flying duties commensurate with the nature of the base (QRA for RAF Coningsby for example, or transport duties from 99 Squadron at RAF Brize Norton).
- Technical (or Engineering) Wing - this wing would work closely with the flying squadrons to ensure that the station/squadron had enough serviceable aircraft to meet the demands of the flying programme.
- Administration (or Administrative) Wing - this wing would be responsible for the administration, support and management of the station including non-flying associated duties, such as the personnel management squadron (human resources), or the RAF Regiment.

RAF 1980s base command structure

This would still be the structure through the second half on the twentieth century and into the 21st century, but the wings would be labelled as:

- Operations squadron
- Engineering squadron
- Base support squadron

Car flag of an RAF station commander

Each individual RAF station contributes to the RAF strategy by delivering its outputs through its mission statement: the mission statement for the transport base at RAF Brize Norton is "..[to] Prepare for and deliver global Air Mobility Operations." The technical training site at RAF Cosford has "to deliver flexible, affordable, modern and effective technical training that meets the needs of the UK's Armed Forces now and into the future" as a mission statement.

=== Lodger units ===
A lodger unit is a military or civil service entity which does not belong to the base it is operating on. A lodger unit on an RAF base would normally be structured through the Base Support Wing (BSW - or equivalent, such as a Base Support Squadron [BSS]). Many gliding schools and smaller units have been located away from main operating bases. In 1993, Upavon airfield was transferred to the army, but a gliding school remained as a lodger unit.

== Naming ==
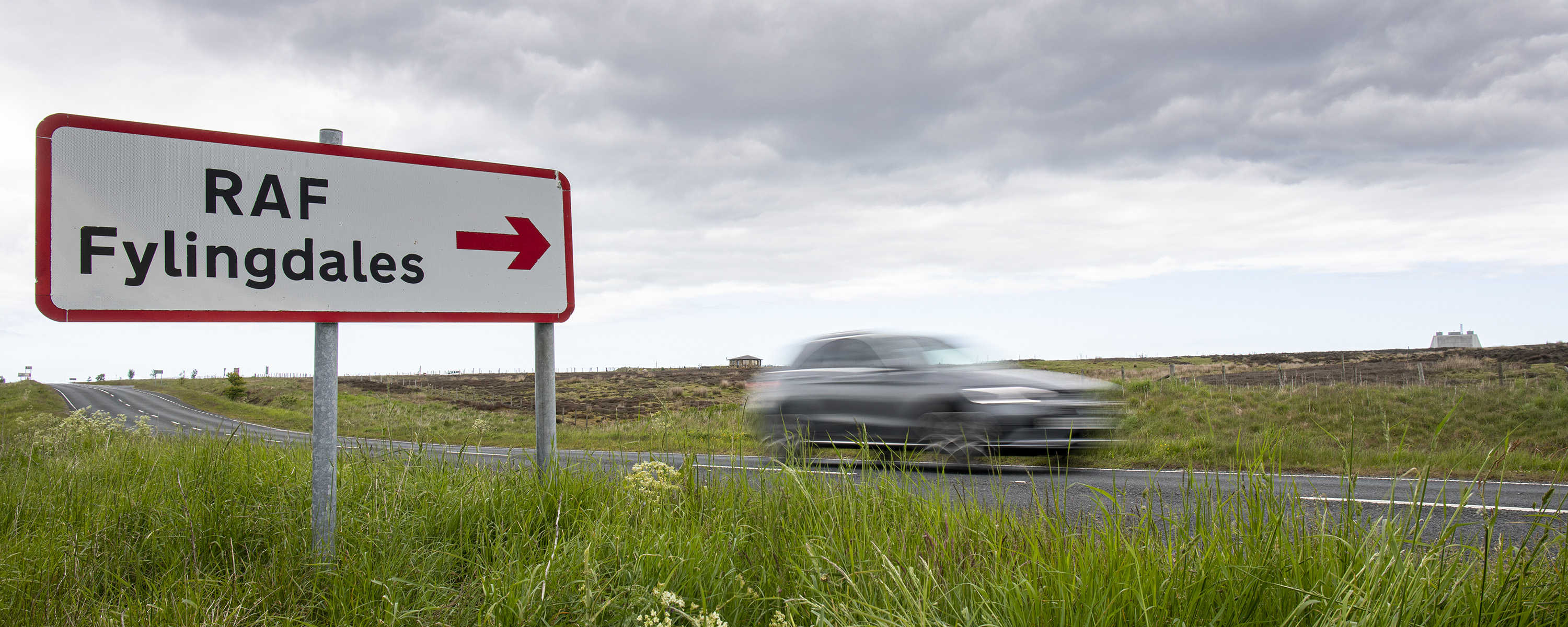
Fylingdales Sign on the A169 road

RAF establishments are traditionally known as stations, though they are sometimes referred to as bases, camps, depots (in terms of personnel; RAF Regiment Depot etc.) and sites. In the early days of the RAF, the term air parks was used, but this fell out of use after the First World War. In the early years of the RAF, very few of its bases were classified as stations. Some bases which were locally known as RAF location name were officially listed under the unit's title. For example, No. 1 Stores Depot was at RAF Kidbrooke which was described as No. 1 Stores Depot. Roadsigns that point the way to RAF stations follow the format of other MoD signage with the name encased in a red rectangle on a white background.

The naming of RAF stations has a chequered and confusing history. Airfields inherited by the RAF at its inception generally retained their previous name. At that time, the UK was home to around 300 aerodromes, most of which were handed back at the end of the war, if not by 1919 or 1920. These generally had a name of somewhere local to that field, although some airfields devoted to training were also known by a depot number, such as RAF Bramham Moor which was Training Depot 38. RAF Brize Norton was named after the nearest railhead (Brize Norton and Bampton) which was on the south side of the airfield. The name of the local town, Carterton, was thought to possibly cause confusion with RAF Cardington, which was at that time, already a base for initial recruits and kitting (No. 2 Recruitment Centre). (Note: Most RAF stations were named locally, but there is no evidence that bases were named after railway stations, though in the days before mass car ownership, having a travel warrant issued to the railway station named the same as the RAF station would be sensible.) RAF Glatton was in the village of Conington, which included an area called Honington, so it was named Glatton to avoid confusion with RAF Honington in Suffolk. Mostly, the naming of stations came from the parish of which the station headquarters was located in. Even those with the names from the parish that the base was in were mistitled; RAF Kings Cliffe was sometimes written as RAF Kingscliffe, and it was in the parish of King's Cliffe (which has an apostrophe). Another possible route for the naming of bases was down to the postal address of the officers' mess on the base; RAF Yatesbury is thought to have selected this way, and it being a 1916 RFC base, the name was kept upon transfer to the RAF.

Post Second World War stations have been few, but even they have not always bowed to convention. When RAF Fylingdales was being scoped out, it was originally intended to be located in the parish of Fylingdales in North Yorkshire. However, the geology of its original location was unsound, and it was also felt that the site being close to the coast was at risk of a seaborne attack. The base was relocated to an area atop a rise known as Snod Hill. Rather than name it RAF Snod Hill, the decision was taken to retain the original name.

Some stations had to change their names because of confusion with other sites. Below is a small section and details covering why their names were changed.

Original station name	Second name	Reason	Ref
RAF Bobbington	RAF Halfpenny Green	Possibly because USAAF crews were confusing Bobbington with RAF Bovingdon	
RAF Butley	RAF Bentwaters	Renamed after farmhouse near to runway. Renamed for reasons of clarity, but it is not known why it needed clarifying	
RAF Church Stanton	RAF Culmhead	To avoid confusion with RAF Church Fenton	
RAF Hartford Bridge	RAF Blackbushe	Confusion arose due to RAF Wyton being near to a settlement called Hartford	
RAF Hatfield Woodhouse	RAF Lindholme	To avoid confusion with Hatfield Aerodrome in Hertfordshire	
RAF Shotwick	RAF Sealand	To avoid confusion with RAF Scopwick. Scopwick itself was also renamed RAF Digby. (Note: Many authors on RAF History have alluded to a story about how RAF Shotwick was receiving parts for aircraft which they had not ordered. Meanwhile, Scopwick airfield were repeatedly requisitioning parts for their aircraft and none were being delivered. Another story relates that RAF Shotwick was the stop-off point for air traffic to Ireland, so the need for correspondence and signals to be properly routed was paramount.)	

Some RAF Stations were named after geographical features (RAF Akeman Street, RAF Hell's Mouth (a dangerous stretch of coastline), RAF Needs Oar Point, and RAF Shepherds Grove (after a wood) being some examples). The stations at Rhosneigr and Heneglwys became RAF Valley and RAF Mona respectively. This was believed to be the difficulty in non-Welsh speakers being able to pronounce their names correctly. Other stations were known by different names, even in official records. A memorandum issued in 1916 stated that the base at Bramham Moor was to be known as RFC Bramham Moor, then in April 1918, it was changed to RAF Tadcaster, but the name of Bramham Moor persisted, even in official documents.

== Heraldry ==
The common elements of a station badge

A diagram of an RAF flagstaff, showing the distinguishing flag of a group captain at the masthead and the RAF Ensign at the gaff/peak.

RAF Station badges are similar to squadron badges; the emblem is surrounded by a light blue ring containing the words "Royal Air Force Station", and the station name, surmounted by the Imperial Crown, and with the motto in a scroll underneath. If a badge was awarded to an RAF establishment, it was described as a station due to it possessing a badge signed by a monarch stating it was called Royal Air Force Station [name].

== Socio-economic effects ==
RAF bases have been noted as having an effect on the area in which they are situated; this can be positive or negative, or even just on the fabric of that area. One of the most populous places within Scotland which is a permanent residence to English people is the Kinloss area, which of all the rural areas surveyed in Scotland in 2001 had the highest percentage of non-Scottish born residents at 47.54%. The location of nearby RAF Kinloss in Moray, and the adjacent RAF Lossiemouth, was said to have contributed £150 million to the local economy annually, and also supported over 5,700 local jobs. This also meant that the RAF households in the Moray area accounted for 7% of the total population, and 8% of its working age population.

RAF Kinloss closed down in 2012 (as well as RAF Leuchars in Fife which closed in 2014), leaving RAF Lossiemouth as the only flying base operating in Scotland. The closure of Leuchars was predicted to have a similar effect on the local economy, but one writer noted that the locals campaigned to keep the RAF base, pointing out that many service personnel on leaving the RAF settle in the local area and form friendships within the area.

In 1975, Lincolnshire County Council produced a report in response to a government white paper which recommended closing 12 RAF bases throughout the United Kingdom. At that time, the report stated that RAF bases in Lincolnshire were located at Binbrook, Coningsby, Cranwell, Digby, Nocton Hall, Scampton, Swinderby and Waddington. In total, these supported over 11,000 jobs in the region, which equated to 5% of the workforce. The report went on to say that:

The RAF in Lincolnshire makes an important social and economic contribution to the quality of social life in the county, and any closure would then have serious consequences for local economies and the quality of social life in many of our communities.

The siting of service families and their housing within a local area also has an effect. Children of service personnel generally attend local schools, and the school receives money for each child, which boosts the financial intake of the school. Upon the notification of the closure of RAF Cottesmore in 2009 (the base closed in 2012), it was noted that some local schools had a surplus of places, so with the possible withdrawal of the pupils and the lack of financial input, some of the local education establishments may suffer. The report into the closure of RAF Cottesmore also stated that with the proximity of RAF Wittering, many RAF families bought private housing in the area to enable them to switch between bases. Although RAF Cottesmore became a British Army establishment (Kendrew Barracks), it was conjectured that as there were no other major British Army sites nearby that the army buy-in to the local community would be significantly smaller than that previously felt under the RAF. Similar effects have been noted in North Yorkshire, where the MoD staff (both uniformed and civil service) numbered 17,149 in 2010. Of these, 25% of the uniformed staff were from the RAF (3,773). Much like the bases at Rutland, it was perceived locally that the RAF integrated more into the local community because they were less transient than the army, which has a large garrison at Catterick near to RAF Leeming. Conversely, it was seen that the army as a whole, would procure equipment and support from within the region, whereas the RAF would look outside of Yorkshire and the Humber region.

RAF stations can also have an effect on the civilian labour force within the area in which they are located; in 1961, the RAF base at St Athan was rated as being the sixth highest employer of the civilian labour force within the Vale of Glamorgan. (Note: The list of employment areas in the Vale of Glamorgan was agriculture and forestry, quarrying, cement works, the building industry, local government, and RAF St Athan.)

Some current and former RAF bases have been proved to have polluted the base and surrounding area. The former base at RAF Duxford is thought to have been the cause of a PFOS incident in the drinking water of South Cambridgeshire. Noise complaints are also often received about flying stations, but this can extend to the Army Air Corps and the Fleet Air Arm too.

== Re-use ==
After the Second World War, many bases were abandoned or sold off; some were given over to care and maintenance whereby a skeleton crew would maintain essential services on a base so that it might be re-opened quickly if needed. Some RAF airfields were converted from municipal airports, as during the war, very little civilian flying was authorised. Of the major airports in the United Kingdom, most were RAF stations re-used and redeveloped for civil aviation. The below is a list of the top 20 United Kingdom airports in terms of passenger numbers for 2024.

Top 20 busiest airports in the United Kingdom (Note: Listings for 2024; this is representative only to show re-use of RAF airfields.)
Airport	WW1 era	WWII era	Name during RAF Occupancy	Post WWII use	Ref
London Heathrow	No	Yes (as Harmondsworth, or the Great West Aerodrome)	RAF Heathrow	Largest airport in Britain in terms of passenger numbers	
London Gatwick	No	Yes	RAF Gatwick	London's second airport	
Manchester	No	Yes	RAF Ringway		
London Stansted	No	No	RAF Stansted Mountfichet	Stansted; marketed as London's third airport	
London Luton	No	Yes	RAF Luton		
Edinburgh	Yes	Yes	RAF Turnhouse	Edinburgh Airport	
Birmingham	No	Yes	RAF Elmdon		
Bristol	No	Yes	RAF Lulsgate Bottom		
Glasgow	No	Yes	RAF Abbotsinch and then as an RNAS base, HMS Sanderling		
Belfast International	Yes	Yes	RAF Aldergrove		
Newcastle	No	Yes	RAF Woolsington		
Liverpool	No	Yes	RAF Speke	Known as Liverpool John Lennon Airport	
Leeds Bradford	No	Yes	RAF Yeadon		
East Midlands	Yes	Yes	RAF Castle Donington		
London City	No	No	None	Opened in October 1987, no military involvement	
Aberdeen	No	Yes	RAF Dyce		
Belfast City	No	Yes	RAF Belfast	Known as Sydenham pre-World War II	
Jersey	No	Yes	RNAS Jersey		
Bournemouth	No	No	RAF Hurn		
Cardiff	No	Yes	RAF Rhoose		

Some bases have remained open, a few new ones have opened on new sites since the end of the Second World War (RAF Fylingdales, RAF Mount Pleasant, and RAF Spadeadam), but most have either been returned to agriculture or industrial use. Some have been turned into windfarms (RAF Lissett), and several have become motor racing tracks or have some association with vehicles (Croft, Silverstone, Hethel, Snetterton Heath, Castle Combe, Thruxton), and some have become prisons. Several former RAF stations have been taken over by the British Army; Oakington, Waterbeach, Little Rissington, Kinloss, Cottesmore, Leuchars, Catterick, Driffield, and Bassingbourn.

== See also ==
- Advanced landing ground
- List of Royal Air Force stations
- List of former Royal Air Force stations
- List of Royal Air Force Satellite Landing Grounds
- List of seaplane bases in the United Kingdom
- Naval air station
