= Rokeby, County Durham =

Civil parish in County Durham, England

Coordinates: 54.519522°N 1.8894258°W

Rokeby
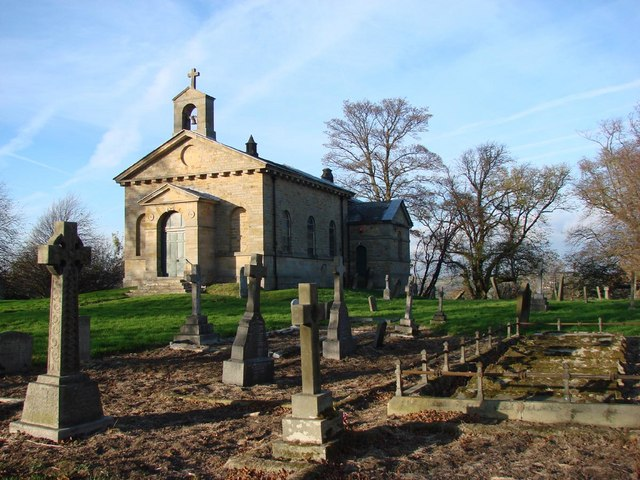

- Location within County Durham
- Area: 15.89 km^{2} (6.14 sq mi)
- Population: 158 (2011 census)
  - Density: 10/km^{2} (26/sq mi)
- Civil parish: Rokeby
- Unitary authority: County Durham
- Ceremonial county: County Durham
- Region: North East
- Country: England
- Sovereign state: United Kingdom
- Website: www.rokebybrignallandegglestonabbeyparishcouncil.org.uk

Rokeby (/ˈroʊkbi/ ROHK-bee) is a civil parish about 2.5 miles from Barnard Castle, in the County Durham district, in the ceremonial county of Durham, England. The parish includes the hamlet of Greta Bridge. In 2011 the parish had a population of 158. The parish touches Barningham, Boldron, Bowes, Brignall, Egglestone Abbey, Westwick, Whorlton and Wycliffe with Thorpe. The A66 runs through the area. Rokeby shares a parish council with Brignall and Egglestone Abbey called "Rokeby, Brignall & Egglestone Abbey Parish Council".

== Features ==
There are 38 listed buildings in Rokeby.

== History ==
The name "Rokeby" means 'Hroca's farm/settlement' or 'rook farm/settlement'. Rokeby was recorded in the Domesday Book as Rochebi. There are no remains of the deserted medieval village of Rokeby or the deserted medieval village of Mortham. Rokeby was "Rochebi" in the 11th century and Rookeby in the 16th and 17th centuries. On 1 April 1974 Rokeby was transferred from the county of Yorkshire North Riding to Durham.

== See also ==
- Rokeby Park
