= Ludworth =

Ludworth is a name for the following settlements in the United Kingdom:

- Ludworth, County Durham
- Ludworth, Greater Manchester (historically in Derbyshire, after 1936 in Cheshire)
