= Scargill, County Durham =

Coordinates: 54.49125°N 1.92279°W

Scargill
- Location within County Durham
- OS grid reference: NZ050106
- Unitary authority: County Durham
- Ceremonial county: County Durham
- Region: North East
- Country: England
- Sovereign state: United Kingdom
- Post town: Barnard Castle
- Postcode district: DL12
- Police: Durham
- Fire: County Durham and Darlington
- Ambulance: North East
- UK Parliament: Bishop Auckland

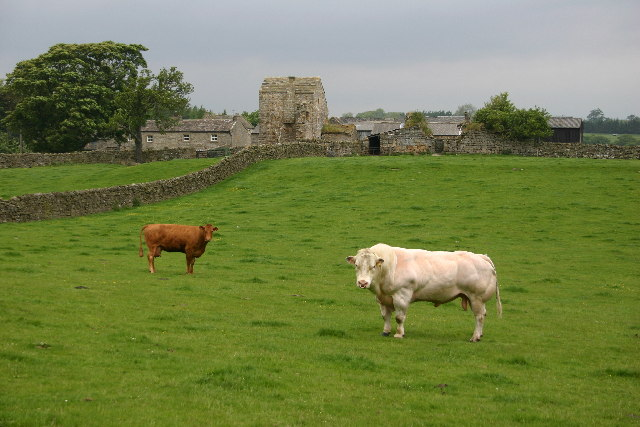
Scargill Castle Farm includes the remains of a 15th-century Castle Keep

Scargill is a hamlet in the Pennines of England, situated close to the River Greta. The population taken at the 2011 Census was less than 100. Details are kept in the parish of Barningham. It lies within the historic boundaries of the North Riding of Yorkshire, but along with the rest of the former Startforth Rural District it was transferred to County Durham for administrative and ceremonial purposes on 1 April 1974, under the provisions of the Local Government Act 1972.

The name Skargill derives from the old Norse and means simply the gill (small valley) of Skarri (a male personal name). Scargill is a dispersed settlement consisting of a number of farms scattered over a wide area. The centre of the village in medieval times was located around Castle farm, where the remains of Scargill Castle can still be seen. The castle is more accurately described as a fortified manor house and was occupied from at least the late 12th century. Only small fragments of the walls of this early building remain surrounded by extensive earthworks, all of which are scheduled as an ancient monument. The castle was rebuilt in the early 16th century and the gatehouse of this building still stands (Grade II* listed). After being on the English Heritage Buildings at Risk register for several years the gatehouse was restored between 1999 and 2001. It has recently been further improved and is now available as a holiday let.

In 2008 Channel 4's Time Team investigated the restored remains of Scargill Castle, discovered a variety of medieval and Tudor buildings. The programme of the dig was first broadcast on 11 January 2009.

The small town of Scargill, in North Canterbury, New Zealand, was named by two Yorkshireman in reference to the town of Scargill, in County Durham.

== References and external links ==
Time Team

- Time Team: Scargill Castle – the Wedding Present

History

- The Gatehouse: Scargill Castle, Barningham
- Keys to the Past: Local History – Scargill (County Durham)
- The Scargill Website: The History of Scargill
- Website for Scargill Castle with a downloadable history
- Blog on the restoration of Scargill Castle
