= Brignall Banks =

- Location within County Durham
- Location: MAGiC MaP
- Nearest town: Barnard Castle
- Coordinates: 54°29′51″N 1°54′12″W
- Area: 89.4 ha (221 acres)
- Established: 1987
- Governing body: Natural England
- Website: Brignall Banks SSSI

Brignall Banks is a Site of Special Scientific Interest in the Teesdale district of south-west County Durham, England. It consists of a narrow belt of woodland on the steep slopes of the valleys of the River Greta and its tributary, Gill Beck, just west of Brignall village and about 6 km south of Barnard Castle.

It is one of the largest expanses of semi-natural woodland in North-east England; a number of scarce species are present, indicating that it is ancient woodland. A varied lichen flora includes several species that are sensitive to air pollution and rare in County Durham, including some, such as Thelotrema lepadinum and Graphis scripta, that are indicator species for ancient woodland.

In the Natural England database of ancient woodlands, it is recorded as part of Mill Wood, which is split into 95.6 ha south of the Greta and 19.2 ha north of the Greta.
