= Brignall =

Coordinates: 54.50577°N 1.89846°W

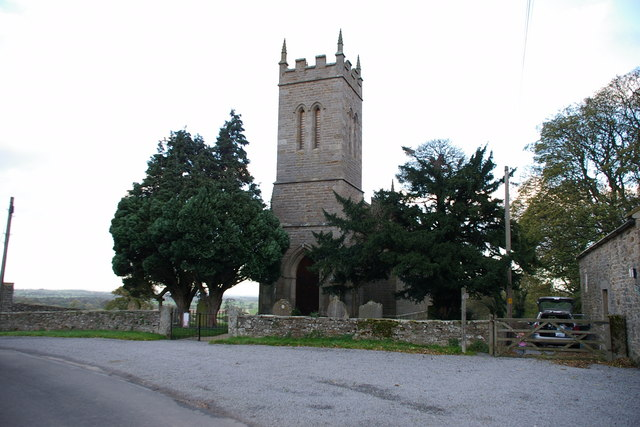
- St Mary's Church, Brignall

- Location within County Durham
- Population: 54 (2021)
- OS grid reference: NZ066122
- Unitary authority: County Durham
- Ceremonial county: County Durham
- Region: North East
- Country: England
- Sovereign state: United Kingdom
- Post town: Barnard Castle
- Postcode district: DL12
- Police: Durham
- Fire: County Durham and Darlington
- Ambulance: North East

Brignall is a village and civil parish in the south-west of County Durham, England. It is located in an elevated position adjacent to the River Greta, 1.2 miles (2 km) upstream from Greta Bridge. The nearest town is the market town of Barnard Castle.

At the 2021 census, the parish had a population of 54.

The village is known for the scenic valley section of the River Greta known as Brignall Banks, which is a Site of Special Scientific Interest.

== Name ==
The name means "Bridge by the nook of land between the stream and the river". Brig is from Medieval English brig and Old English brycg, meaning bridge; en is a common abbreviation of Medieval English atten ("at the, by the"); hale is from Old English healh ("corner, nook, secret place, corner of land left by the stream in a river valley").

The name was recorded as Bringhenale in the Domesday Book.

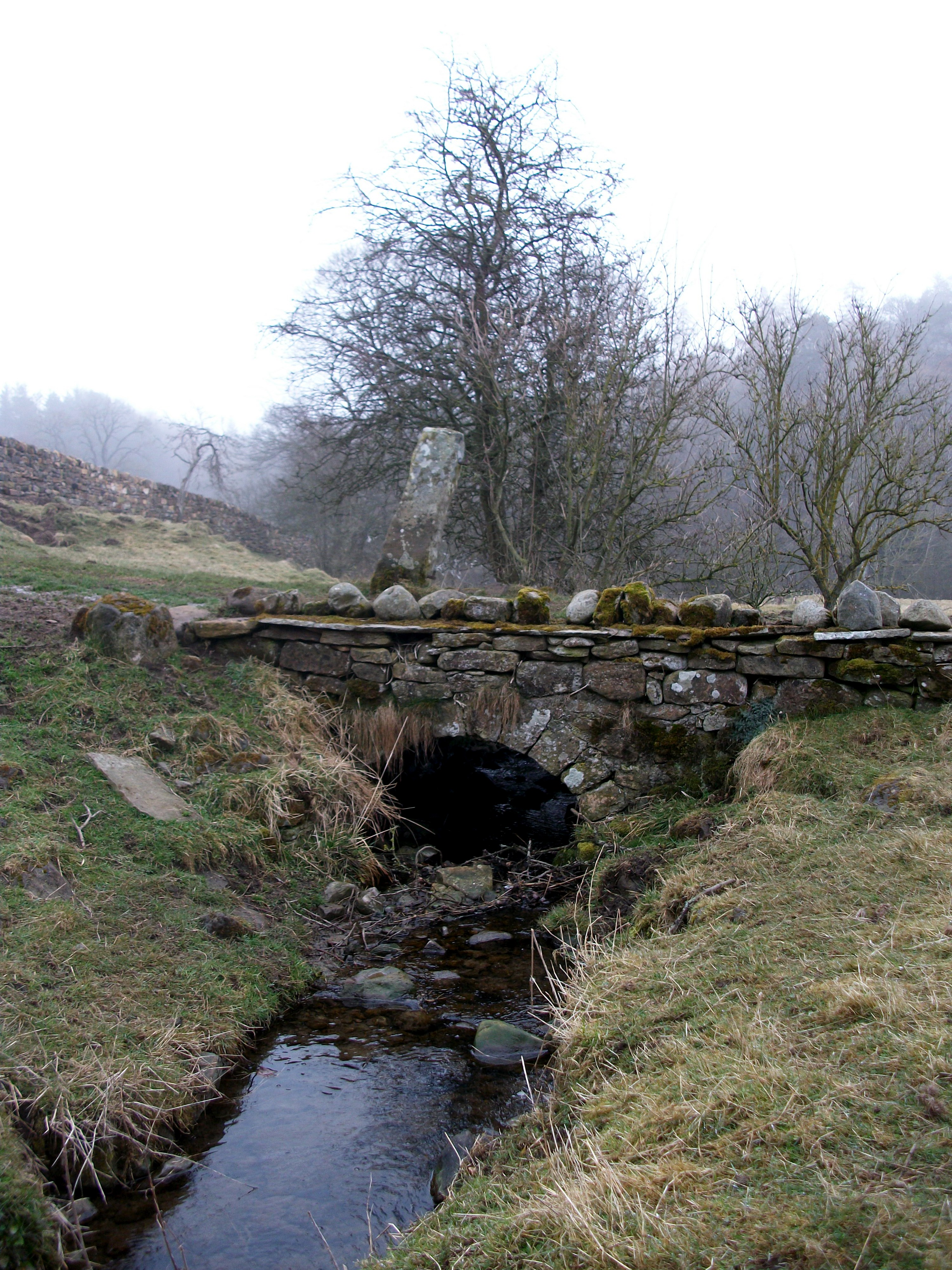
Stone Bridge over Brignall Beck

== History ==
The village was recorded in the Domesday Book (1086) as a settlement in the hundred of land of Alan Rufus in the county of Yorkshire. The village had:

- Households: 16 villagers. 3 freemen. 6 smallholders. 1 men
- Ploughland: 152.5 ploughlands. 6 lord's plough teams. 12.5 men's plough teams.
- Other resources: Meadow 12 acres. Woodland 1 * 1 leagues. 1 fishery. 2 churches.

== Governance ==
At the upper tier of local government, Brignall is in the County Durham unitary authority. For elections to Durham County Council, it is part of the Barnard Castle East electoral ward. At the lower tier, Brignall is a civil parish, which has a joint parish council with the neighbouring Rokeby and Egglestone Abbey parishes.

Historically, Brignall was in the Startforth Rural District of the North Riding of Yorkshire from 1894 to 1974. It was then in the Teesdale district of County Durham from 1974 to 2019.

== Art and culture ==
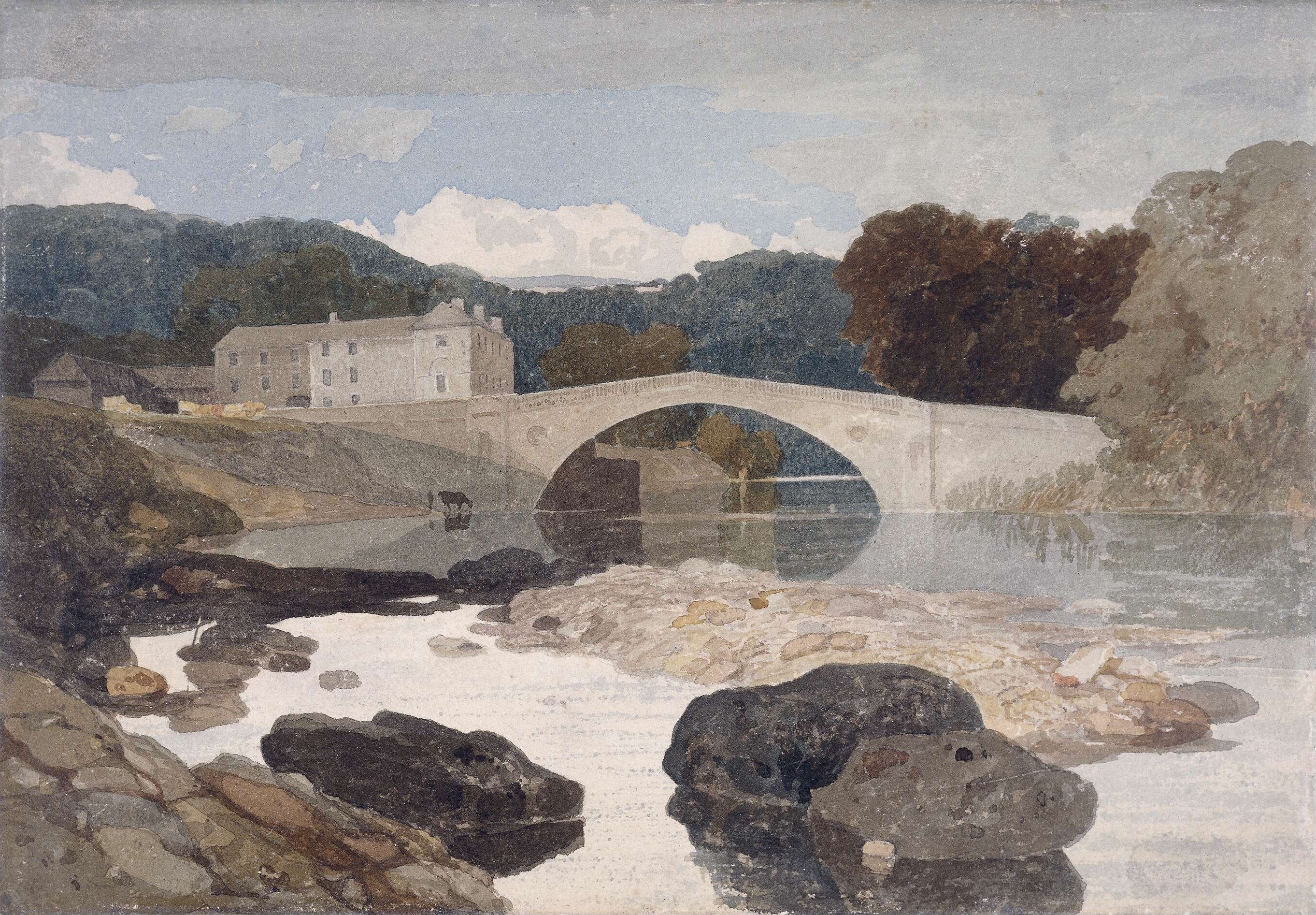
Greta Bridge, John Sell Cotman, c. 1806.

The River Greta and the Brignall area were painted by John Sell Cotman and J. M. W. Turner amongst others.

The area features in Sir Walter Scott’s 1813 poem 'Rokeby': "Oh Brignal banks are wild and fair/ and Greta woods are green".
