= Ludworth Tower =

- Ludworth, County Durham
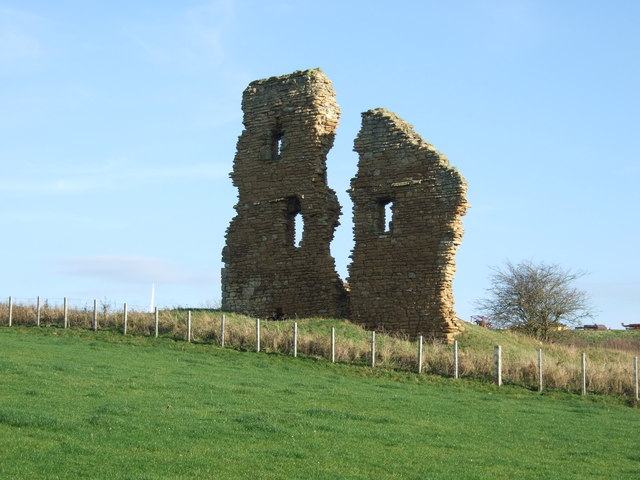
- The ruins of Ludworth Tower in 2021

Site information
- Type: Manor house, pele tower
- Open to the public: Yes
- Condition: Ruined

Location
- Shown within County Durham
- Coordinates: 54.76657°N 1.4377006°W

Site history
- Built: 1411
- Built by: de Ludworth family
- Materials: Limestone and sandstone
- Demolished: Before 1785

Ludworth Tower was a manor house and later a pele tower in the pit village of Ludworth, County Durham. Only ruins survive today.

== History ==
Ludworth Tower was built by the de Ludworth family and it passed into the hands of the Holden family, who added the tower in 1411. Roger Holden gained a licence on 6 August 1422 to crenelate Ludworth Tower to Thomas Holden by Cardinal Thomas Langley and during the same year Thomas added a rectangular pele tower to the structure which was at least three storeys high.

In 1785 W. Hutchinson noted that Ludworth Tower was a ruin.

In 1890, most of the ruins collapsed, leaving only the ruins that survive today extant. In 1905 a ditch was apparently discovered near the tower but no signs of the ditch survive today. The only surviving remains are the barrel-vaulted basement, the three storey west wall and fragments of a first floor spiral stair in the south wall.
