= Bowes Castle =

Castle in County Durham, England

- Bowes, County Durham, England
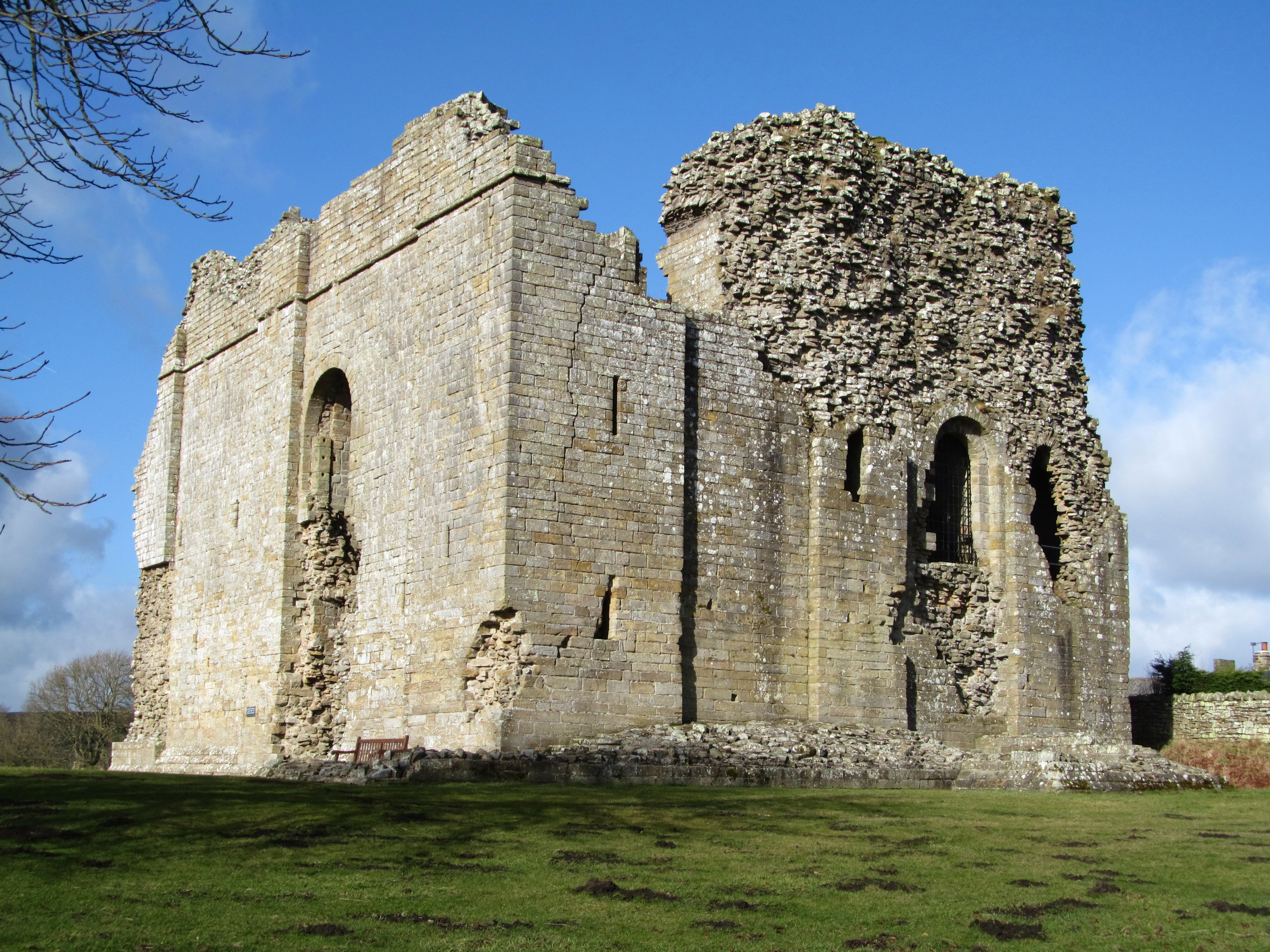
- The keep

Site information
- Owner: English Heritage
- Open to the public: Yes

Location
- Shown within County Durham
- Coordinates: 54.5168°N 2.0139°W
- Grid reference: grid reference NY992135

Site history
- Materials: Stone
- Events: Great Revolt of 1173–74

Bowes Castle is a medieval castle in the village of Bowes in County Durham, England. Built within the perimeter of the former Roman fort of Lavatrae, on the Roman road that is now the A66, the early timber castle on the site was replaced by a more substantial stone structure between 1170 and 1174 on the orders of Henry II. A planned village was built alongside the castle. Bowes Castle withstood Scottish attack during the Great Revolt of 1173–74 but was successfully looted by rebels in 1322. The castle went into decline and was largely dismantled after the English Civil War. The ruins are now owned by English Heritage and managed as a tourist attraction. There is free admission during daylight hours.

== History ==
=== 12th century ===
Bowes Castle was built within the ruins of the Roman fort of Lavatrae. The route was one of the few upland passes to link England and Scotland and had remained strategically important during the medieval period. The castle site lay within the Honour of Richmond, a grouping of lands traditionally owned by the Counts of Brittany during the early medieval period, but the land itself was a demesne estate, owned by the Crown.

Around 1136, Alan de Bretagne, the Count of Brittany, built a timber castle in the north-west corner of the old fort. The use made of the older Roman fort at Bowes was similar to that at the nearby castles of Brough and Brougham to the west, on the same Roman road over the Stainmore Pass across the Pennines. Bowes Castle was inherited by his son, Conan, and when he in turn died in 1171, it was claimed by Henry II.

Royal concerns over security led to Henry II investing heavily in a new castle structure on the site between 1171 and 1174. It was unusual for a new royal castle to be built in this part of England during the 12th century, and Henry appears to have been driven by the military threat from Scotland before and during the Great Revolt of 1173 to 1174. Henry II spent almost £600 on the castle between 1170 and 1187, most of it in the first few years, rebuilding the older structure under the supervision of the Count of Brittany's local tenants, Torfin, Osbert and Stephen of Barningham. (Note: It is impossible to accurately compare 12th century and modern prices or incomes. For comparison, £600 represents around four times the typical average annual income for a typical 12th century baron.)

The plan of the hall-keep

The rebuilt castle featured a hall-keep, an uncommon design in English castles; built of stone, this was a three-storied structure 82 feet (25 m) long, 60 feet (18 m) wide and 50 feet (15 m) high. Internally the keep was divided to form a long hall and a solar and was lit by large, rounded windows. The keep had architectural similarities to various nearby castles in the region, but in particular to those at Middleham Castle in Middleham, and Pendragon Castle in Outhgill. A ditch formed an inner defensive bailey around the keep, with the ramparts of the old fort forming a larger, outer bailey. A mill, then an essential part of any castle, was built by the River Greta to supply flour for the garrison. The village of Bowes was built after the castle and formed a planned site running up to the castle, complete with a church and a market place; this form of planned village is again unusual in England.

In England, the Great Revolt against Henry's rule involved a coalition of rebel barons, bolstered by support from the King of Scots and European allies. King William the Lion pushed south from Scotland in 1173 and Bowes Castle was damaged in the raids; work was carried out in anticipation of further attacks the following year, including repairs to the chamber, gates and the construction of bulwarks around the keep. The next year William, King of Scots directly besieged the castle, but was he forced to retreat after the arrival of a relief force led by Henry's illegitimate son Geoffrey, then the Bishop of Lincoln.

=== 13th – 14th centuries ===
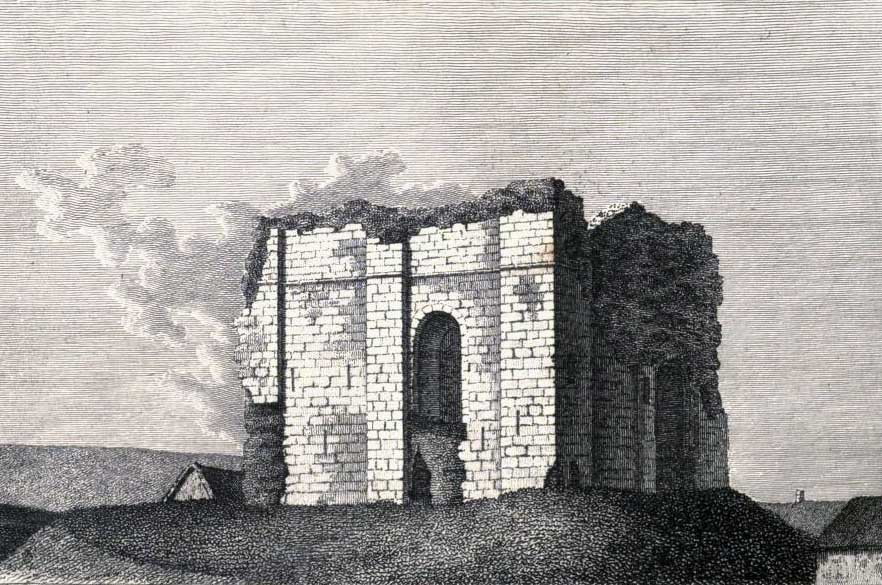
The ruins of Bowes Castle depicted in an engraving of 1785. The first-floor entrance arch is visible at centre; the steps leading to it have gone.

Henry II was successful in quelling the Great Revolt, capturing William the Lion at the Second Battle of Alnwick and imprisoning him until a peace treaty was agreed, extending Henry's authority north into Scotland. In the subsequent years the security situation in the north of England improved significantly. King John gave control of Bowes Castle to Robert de Vieuxpont, an important administrator in the north, in 1203 and he retained control of the fortification until 1228. John stayed there himself in 1206 and in 1212, and the castle was also used briefly to hold John's niece Eleanor of Brittany, who had been placed under the custody of Vieuxpont. Henry III granted it briefly to William de Blockley and Gilbert de Kirketon, until it was given to Duke Peter of Brittany in 1232, and then to William de Valence. In 1241 Peter II, the Count of Savoy was made the Earl of Richmond and was then given Bowes by the king.

The castle remained in the hands of the Earls of Richmond until 1322, by when it was in a poor state of repair. Edward II then gave Bowes Castle to John de Scargill instead; the local tenants of the Earl of Richmond rebelled and attacked the castle. The lord of the castle was away at the time, and the attackers burnt part of a hall, drank four tuns of wine and stole armour, springalds and other goods. Conflict with Scotland led to further raids against the castle and the surrounding manor; the neighbouring fields were abandoned as a result and by 1340 the castle was in ruins and the manor worth nothing.

=== Later history ===
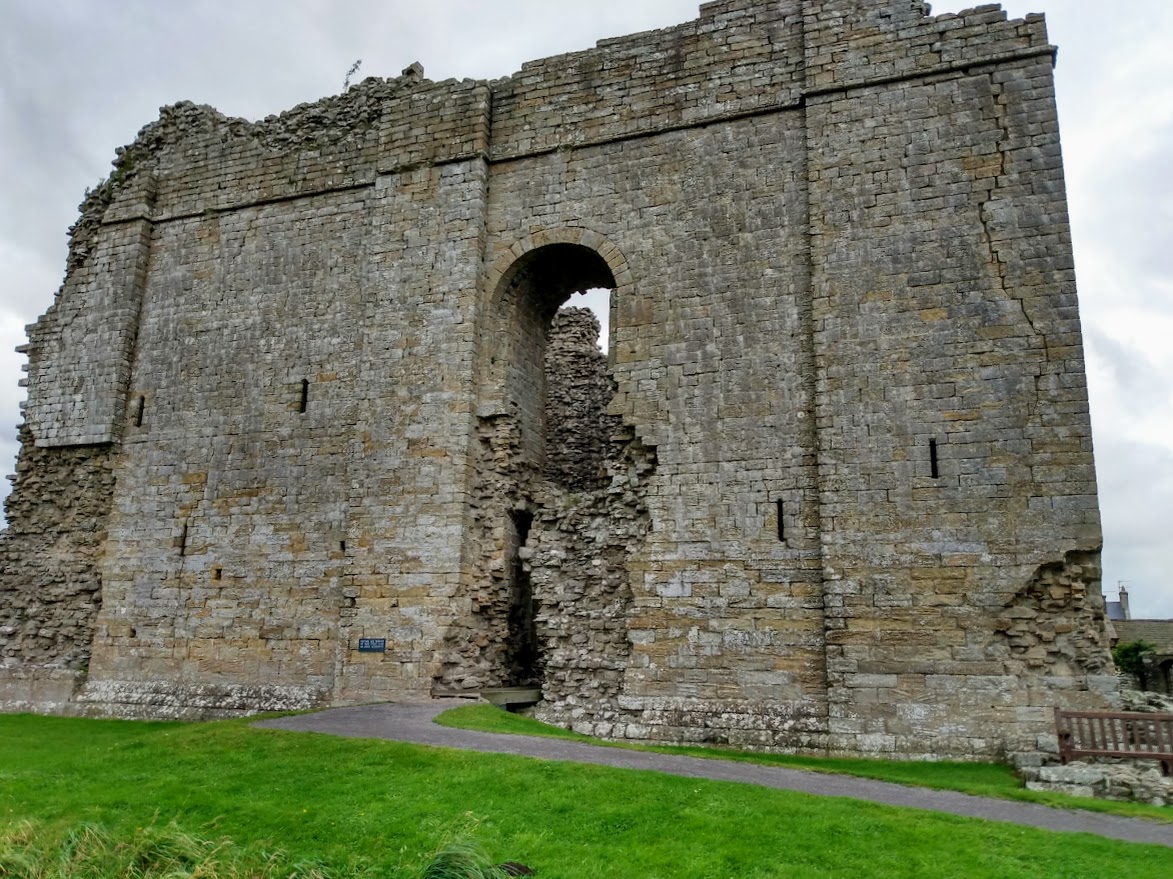
The south wall of the keep

Still ruined, Bowes Castle was reclaimed by the Crown in 1361; between 1444 and 1471 it was controlled by the Neville family, powerful regional landowners, before reverting to the Crown once again. James I sold the castle in the early 17th century and most of the remaining fortifications were dismantled in the mid-17th century after the English Civil War. By 1928, the castle was in a poor condition, with little interest being shown in it from locals or its owner, Lady Lorna Curzon-Howe. Facing death duties on her estate, Curzon-Howe agreed to pass the castle into the care of the Office of Works in 1931.

In the 21st century, the castle is controlled by English Heritage and operated as a tourist attraction. The ruins of the keep survive, largely intact, and are protected as a Grade I listed building and as a scheduled monument.

== See also ==
- Castles in Great Britain and Ireland
- List of castles in England

== Bibliography ==
- Brown, R. Allen (1962). Castles and Landscapes: Power, Community and Fortification in Medieval England. London: Batsford. OCLC 1392314.
- Butler, Lawrence (2003). "The Origins of the Honour of Richmond and its Castles". In Liddiard, Robert (ed.). Anglo-Norman Castles. Woodbridge, UK: Boydell Press. ISBN 978-0-85115-904-1.
- Creighton, Oliver Hamilton (2005). Castles and Landscapes: Power, Community and Fortification in Medieval England. London: Equinox. ISBN 978-1-904768-67-8.
- Fry, Sebastion (2002). "A History of the National Heritage Collection: Volume 5, 1931–1945". Research Report Series. Portsmouth, UK: English Heritage. ISSN 2046-9799.
- Goodall, John (2011). The English Castle. New Haven: Yale University Press. ISBN 978-0-300-11058-6.
- Kenyon, Katy (1999). Barnard Castle, Egglestone Abbey, Bowes Castle. London: English Heritage. ISBN 1-85074-720-2.
- Mackenzie, James D. (1896). The Castles of England: Their Story and Structure, Vol II. New York: Macmillan. OCLC 504892038.
- Pettifer, Adrian (2002). English Castles: A Guide by Counties. Woodbridge, UK: Boydell Press. ISBN 978-0-85115-782-5.
- Pounds, Norman John Greville (1994). The Medieval Castle in England and Wales: A Social and Political History. Cambridge, UK: Cambridge University Press. ISBN 978-0-521-45828-3.
