= Condatis =

Celtic god of Roman Britain

Condatis (Note: The inscriptions give only the dative form Condati. The editors of the Roman Inscriptions of Britain print the nominative as Condates, whereas in Celtic scholarship the god is usually called Condatis.) was a Celtic god worshipped in Roman Britain and there identified with the Roman god Mars. His name is connected with the Celtic word condate, 'confluence (of two rivers)', one of the commonest elements in Celtic place-names. He is known only from a small group of votive altars in the north of Britain, on all of which he is invoked as Mars Condates. The meaning of his name is disputed. He is generally seen as a god of the meeting of rivers, although other readings have also been proposed.

== Name ==
Roman sandstone altar from Moulton, North Yorkshire, dedicated to Mars Condates.

The name Condatis is formed from the Celtic word condate ('confluence [of two rivers]'), the equivalent of Latin confluentia. It derives from Proto-Celtic *kom-dati- ('confluence'), itself from an earlier *kom-d^{h}h_{1}-ti- ('put with, put together', i.e. 'grouping, reunion'), giving a sense close to 'assemblage'. This was one of the most frequent elements in Celtic, and especially Gaulish, place-names, where it marked a settlement at the meeting of two watercourses.

The god's name has generally been understood in the same way, as 'the one of the confluence' or 'watersmeet', which would mark him as a god of the meeting of rivers. Xavier Delamarre has questioned this reading. He first suggested that the related personal names Condatus, Condatius and Condatis might instead be family names meaning 'the reunited one', or 'the adopted one' given after fosterage, rather than 'the one of the confluence'. He later argued that the divine name should be read as '(the one of the) meeting' or 'the reunited one' rather than 'the confluence', and that it probably alludes to mythological matters that can no longer be recovered.

It survives in Condate, the ancient name of Rennes and Northwich, and in many other place names, including Condom, Condéon (both from *Condate-o-magos), Cond (< *Condate-dunum), Conz (Trier), Canstatt (Condistat), Candé, Conte, and Candes. Jan de Vries grouped Condatis with the bynames of Mars that derive from place-names, alongside such forms as Cemenelus and Budenicus.

== Cult ==
Condatis is attested only in Roman Britain, and nothing is recorded of him beyond his votive altars. On all of them he is identified with Mars through the interpretatio romana, so that his native name survives only as a byname of the Roman god. James MacKillop describes him as closely associated with the confluence of rivers.

Two of the altars, from Chester-le-Street and Cramond, were found where two watercourses meet. Anne Ross read the name as that of a 'god of the watersmeet' and linked him with the cult of healing waters, unlike the other northern gods equated with Mars in his warlike aspect.

== Epigraphy ==
Condatis is known only from Latin votive inscriptions, all found in the north of Roman Britain, and on every one he is identified with Mars through the interpretatio romana. Bernhard Maier records three altars naming the god, from Bowes, Piercebridge and Chester-le-Street. Two further dedications are also known: one from Moulton, found in 2015, and a fragmentary and doubtful one from Cramond.

Four of the altars come from the Tees basin and its neighbourhood, in County Durham and North Yorkshire. The fifth, whose reading is uncertain, comes from the fort at Cramond on the Firth of Forth. James MacKillop notes that the god was closely bound up with the confluence of rivers, and two of the find-spots do lie at a river-junction. The Chester-le-Street altar was found beside the Cong Burn near its meeting with the River Wear, and the Cramond fragment comes from a fort at the mouth of the Almond where it joins the Firth of Forth.

Text	Find-spot	Divine name(s)	Translation	Reference	Comments
[M]arti Condati Arponatus v(otum) s(olvit) l(ibens) m(erito)	Lavatrae (County Durham)	Mars Condatis	To Mars Condatis, Arponatus willingly and deservedly fulfilled his vow.	RIB 731	2nd or 3rd century AD. The stone was reused, and the earlier text read only Marti. Also published as AE 1938, 113.
D(eo) M(arti) Condati Attonius Quintianus men(sor) evoc(atus) imp(eratum) ex ius(su) sol(vit) l(ibens) a(nimo)	Piercebridge (County Durham)	Mars Condatis	To the god Mars Condatis, Attonius Quintianus, surveyor and evocatus, fulfilled the command by order, willingly and gladly.	RIB 1024	2nd or 3rd century AD. Found east of the fort, at Cliffe. Now lost. Also CIL VII, 420.
Deo Marti Condati V(alerius) [P]rob[i]anus [pr]o se et suis v(otum) s(olvit) l(ibens) m(erito)	Chester-le-Street (County Durham)	Mars Condatis	To the god Mars Condatis, Valerius Probianus, for himself and his household, willingly and deservedly fulfilled his vow.	RIB 1045	2nd or 3rd century AD. Found beside the Cong Burn, near its confluence with the River Wear.
D(eo) M(arti) Con[dati ...]	Cramond (Edinburgh)	Mars Condatis (?)	To the god Mars Condatis ...	RIB 3500	Later 2nd or early 3rd century AD. Fragmentary. The letter after M may be G rather than C, so the attribution is uncertain. From the fort at the mouth of the Almond. Also AE 1978, 451.
d(eo) Marti Condati Cunobacha p(osuit)	Moulton (North Yorkshire)	Mars Condatis	To the god Mars Condatis, Cunobacha set this up.	RIB Brit. 47.1	Found in 2015 near Cataractonium. The dedicator's name Cunobacha is otherwise unknown. It opens with the Celtic element *cuno- ('hound'). Published in Britannia 47 (2016).
