= Barningham Park =

Coordinates: 54.4871°N 1.8684°W

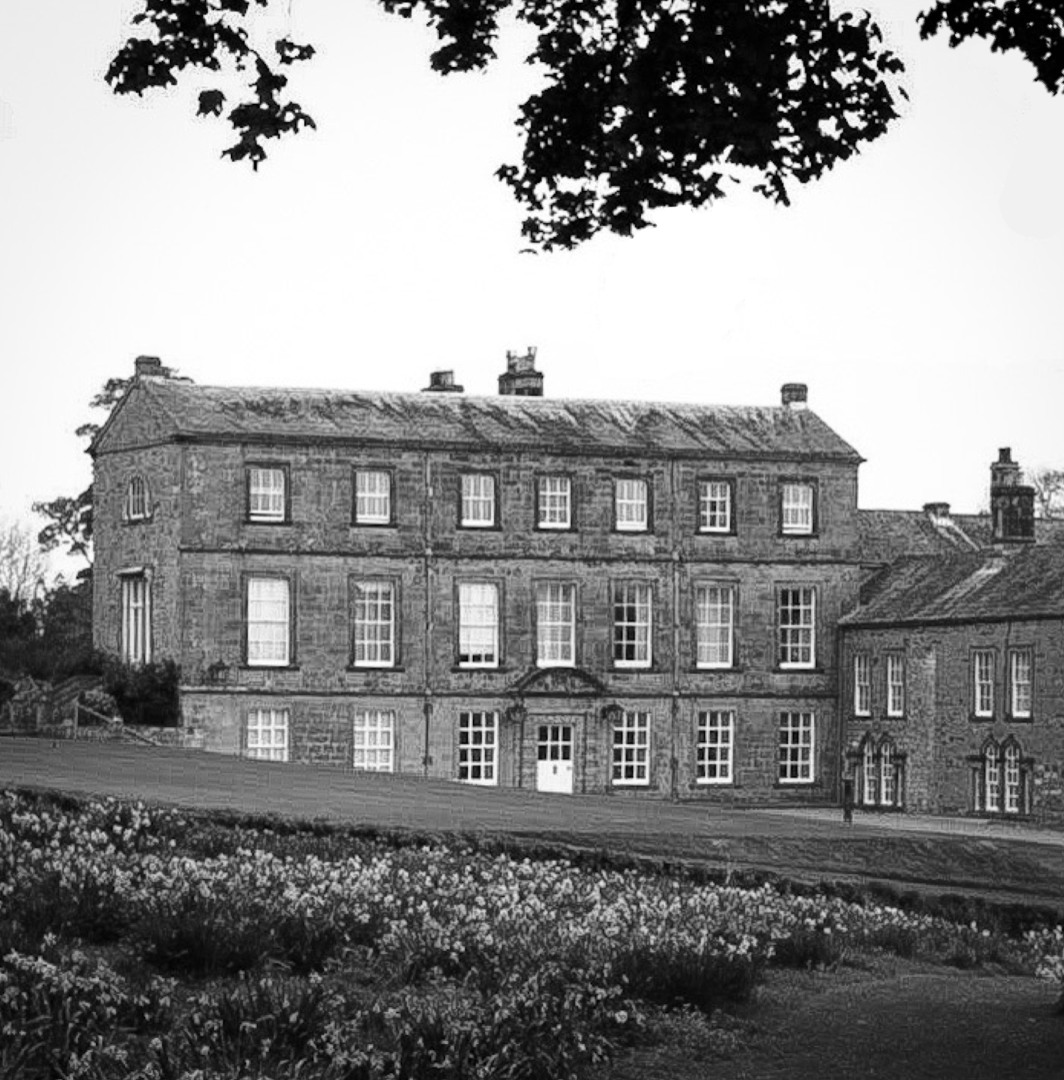

General information
- Town or city: Barningham, England
- Owner: The Milbank Family

Barningham Park is a Grade II* listed country house and 7,000 acre estate located in the village of Barningham, County Durham (formerly the North Riding of Yorkshire), England.

== House and Estate ==
The house dates back to the 15th century and came into the possession of the Milbank (also spelt Milbanke) family in 1690. The landed Milbank family have long held connections to this area of northern England. Traditionally, the estate generated income from farming, forestry, and a productive set of grouse moors, as well as investments in residential and commercial property. More recently, the estate has sought to diversify its income under the tenure of Sir Edmward Milbank. Projects have included hospitality, taking the village pub, The Milbank Arms, in hand.

== Filming Location ==
Several properties on the estate were used as filming locations for the popular television series All Creatures Great and Small.
