= Lavatrae =

Roman era fort in England with minor remaining ruins

- Bowes, County Durham, England

Site information
- Type: Castra
- Condition: Earthworks only survive

Location
- Coordinates: 54.5168°N 2.0136°W

Site history
- In use: early 70s AD - 4th century AD
- Materials: A wooden fort surrounded by stone walls

Lavatrae, also known as Lavatris, was a Roman fort in the modern-day village of Bowes, County Durham, England. The medieval Bowes Castle was built within the perimeter of the fort.

== Roman period ==
The Romans built a fort with wooden ramparts at Lavatrae in the early AD 70s, after an invasion of the region by Governor Petilius Cerealis. It was intended as a waypoint on the northern leg of the Roman equivalent of Watling Street in the section connecting Luguvalium (Carlisle) to Eboracum (York) and points south. It guarded the eastern entrance to the Stainmore Pass through the Pennines, overlooking the River Greta. The name Verterae, arguably another name for "Lavatrae", meant "summit".

Stone walls were built around the site in the 130s, and an external settlement called a vicus was constructed to the north of the fort, with a bathhouse to the south-east. The bathhouse was 30 by 20 feet (9.1 by 6.1 m), tiled and appears to have been destroyed in a fire, and then rebuilt. The fort and the vicus were occupied until at least the late 4th century.

== Post-Roman period ==
The bathhouse was excavated in the 19th century. Minor archaeological investigations were undertaken in 1923, while the Office of Works was carrying out repairs on the medieval castle, with more deliberate investigations of the Roman fort being carried out in 1954, 1966–67, 1970, 1988, 1990 and 2009. The Cambridge Museum of Archaeology has a stone altar from the bathhouse, erected by the 1st Cohort of the Thracians.

Only earthworks and the parts of the stone walls of the bathhouse survive in the 21st century.

== Bibliography ==
- Birley, Eric (1958). "The Roman fort at Brough-under-Stainmore". Transactions of the Cumberland and Westmorland Antiquarian and Archaeological Society: 31–56. doi:10.5284/1062521.
