= Shadforth =

Village in County Durham, England

Coordinates: 54.762°N 1.466°W

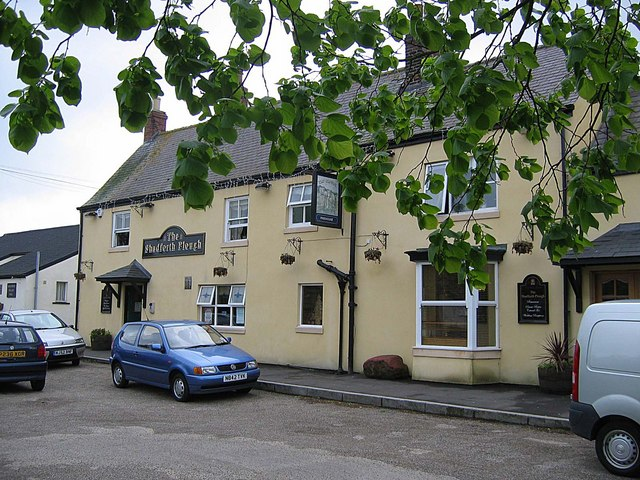
The Shadforth Plough pub

Shadforth is a village in County Durham, England, a few miles east of Durham. The historic centre of the village is a conservation area. The population at the 2011 census was 2,118.

Shadforth is also a civil parish that incorporates Ludworth and Sherburn Hill.

== History ==
Shadforth was a farming village from around AD 600. The village is mentioned in the Boldon Book of 1183. It is perhaps the only village in England with the name 'Shadforth' meaning 'Shallow Ford’. Shadforth is unusual in that it has never had its own pit in an area where mining was a large part of the community.
