= Milbank Arms, Barningham =

Milbank Arms
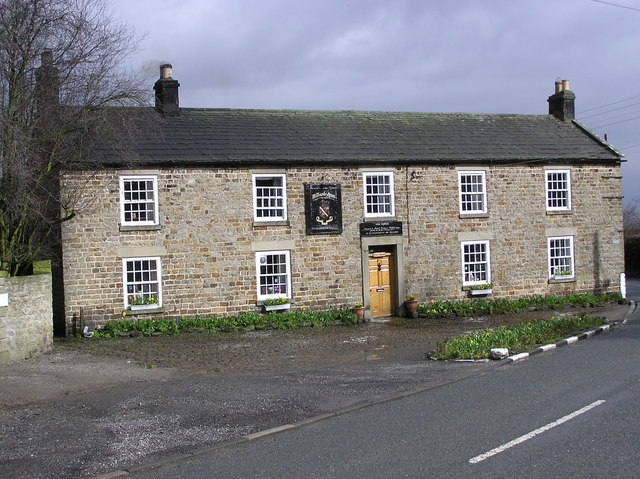
- The Milbank Arms in 2006

General information
- Type: Public house
- Location: The Milbank Arms, Barningham, County Durham, DL11 7DW, Barningham, County Durham
- Coordinates: 54°29′19″N 1°52′13″W
- Designations

Listed Building – Grade II
- Official name: Milbank Arms
- Designated: 1967-01-12
- Reference no.: 1322713

Website
- https://www.themilbankarms.com/

The Milbank Arms is a Grade II listed public house at Barningham, County Durham. Built in the early 19th century, it spent a period as a hotel before converting to a public house. It was one of the last public houses in the country to not include a bar counter when one was fitted in 2018. The public house, and former hotel, are named after local land owning family, the Milbanks, who have recently taken over the license.

== History ==
The building dates back to the early 19th century and it opened as the Milbank Hotel in 1860. In the early 1900s, it was refurbished a public house, but unusually for English pubs it did not include a bar counter. Instead, drinks would be fetched directly from the cellar by the staff. However, a bar was put in place in 2018 by the current landlord - at the time there were only eight remaining pubs without a bar in England. Due to this change, the Campaign for Real Ale have put the pub's "unspoilt" status under review. It had previously been on the Campaign for Real Ale's National Inventory of Historic Pub Interiors.

The building is made of stone, with a slate roof. There are three rooms on the ground floor, a domino room, a tap room and a dining room. The dining room was historically used for collections of rents from tenants of the land in the 19th century. Few different landlords have run the Millbank arms, between 1860 and 2018, only three different names have been on the license above the door. It had been run by the Turner family between 1939 and 2018, before being taken over by Sir Edward Milbank.
