= Greta Bridge =

Coordinates: 54.51336°N 1.86715°W

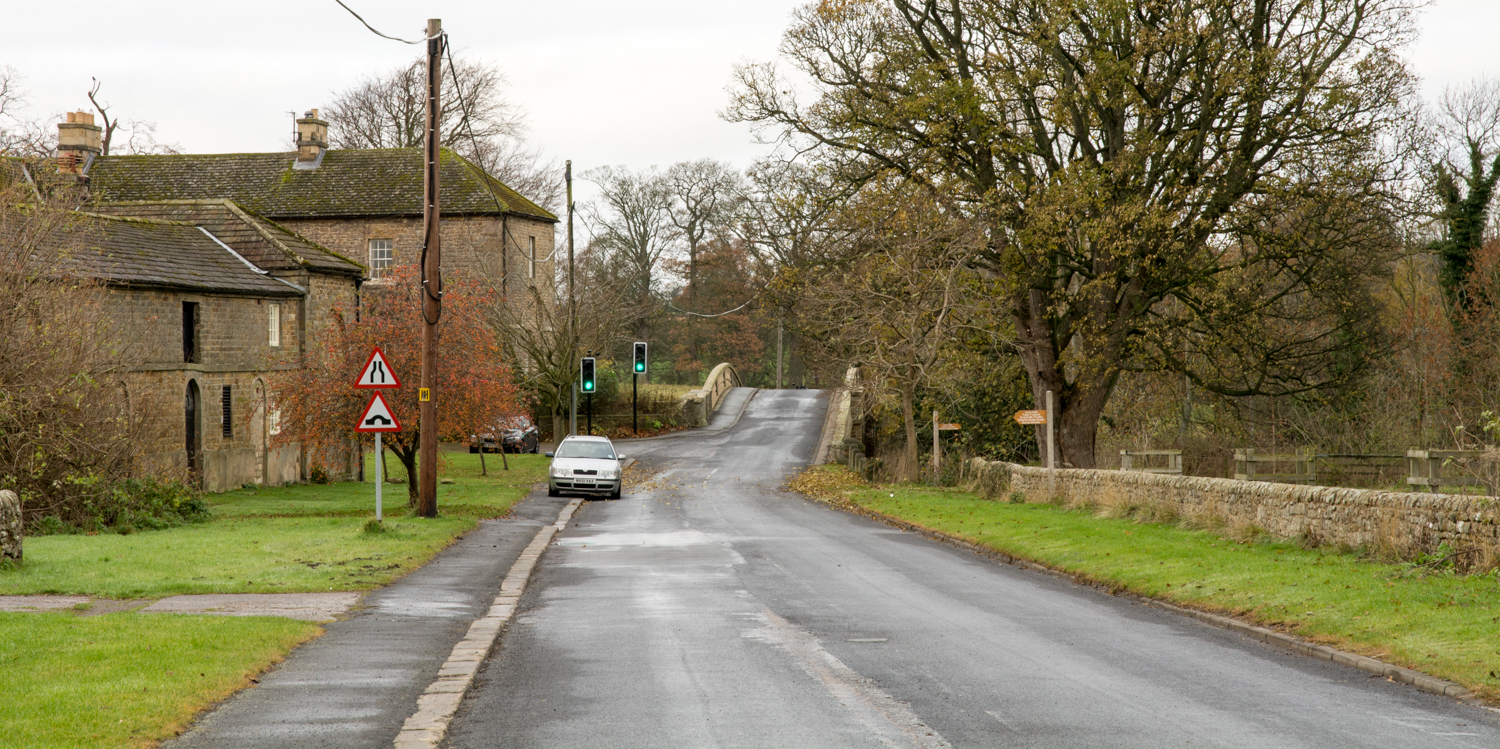

- Location within County Durham
- OS grid reference: NZ086131
- Unitary authority: County Durham
- Ceremonial county: Durham
- Region: North East
- Country: England
- Sovereign state: United Kingdom
- Police: Durham
- Fire: County Durham and Darlington
- Ambulance: North East
- UK Parliament: Bishop Auckland

Greta Bridge is a hamlet on the River Greta in the parishes of Rokeby and Brignall in County Durham, England. The bridge (now bypassed by the A66 trunk road) is over the River Greta, just south of its confluence with the River Tees. The North Pennines, Teesdale and the Greta Bridge area – including the Meeting of the Waters – became a source of inspiration for romantic artists, poets and writers during the eighteenth century.

== Name ==
The name derives from the River Greta, recorded earlier as Gretha (1279) and Gretay (1341).

The etymology is a hybrid of Old Norse and Old English. The Old Norse grjót means "coarse stones" or "rubble". The Old English ēa means "river", "running water" or "stream".

== Governance ==
Greta Bridge is part of County Durham district and is governed by Durham County Council. The neighbouring village of Newsham – to the south-east – is part of North Yorkshire district.

Historically, Greta Bridge was in the North Riding of Yorkshire, but along with the rest of the former Startforth Rural District, Greta Bridge was transferred to County Durham for administrative and ceremonial purposes in 1974.

== Geography ==
The village lies on the eastern flanks of the North Pennines – about 6 miles (9.7 km) east of the North Pennines area of outstanding natural beauty. The nearest town – Barnard Castle – is the market town for Teesdale.

The village is divided between Rokeby parish and Brignall parish. The boundary follows the river Greta.

== History ==
=== Roman ===
Greta Bridge is on the route of the trans-Pennine (Stainmore) section of Watling Street (North) Roman road – now largely followed by the A66 trunk road. Archaeological excavations during the 1970's found part of the original road. (Note: Historic England..."Immediately to the north of the fort there are the buried remains of the Roman road and the vicus. These remains were identified and partially excavated in the 1970s in advance of the A66 road re-alignment at Greta Bridge...)

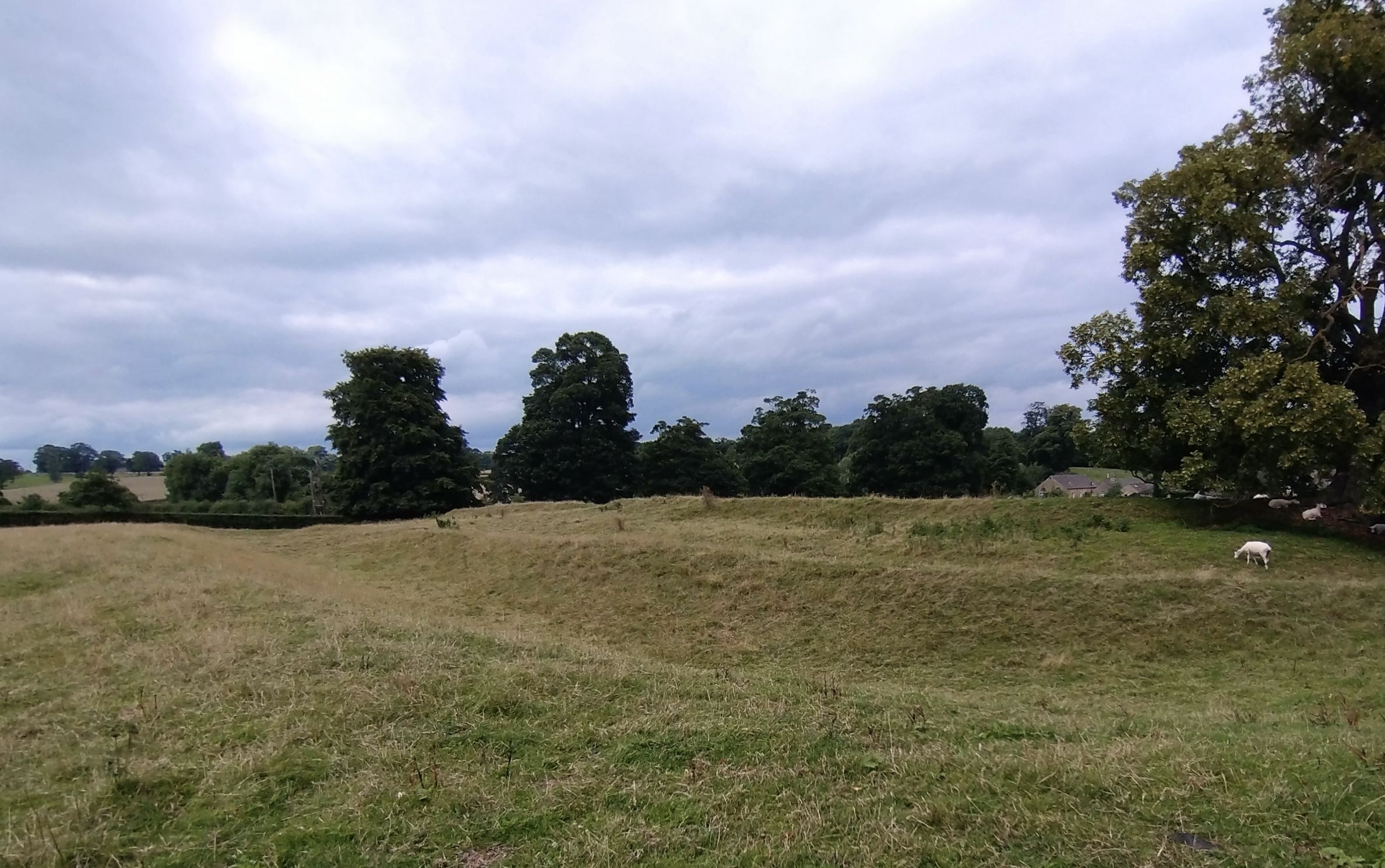
Maglona ramparts.

Greta Bridge is the location of a roman fort, or castrum, Maglona. An inscription found near the north gate suggests that the fort was built during the early third century AD, although it is possible that a fort existed on the site as early as the first century AD. (Note: Historic England..."The exact date for the construction of the fort is uncertain; some evidence suggests it was constructed during the first century AD, but it may be as late as the late second century or the early third century.) (Note: Tynedale Hadrian's Wall Group..."Greta Bridge Roman Fort was probably built about 80AD about the same time as the first road...) It was built to protect the Watling Street crossing of the River Greta – river crossings were particularly vulnerable to attack from the local Brigantes or from other local tribes.

The Tutta Beck–Greta confluence and the Greta–Tees confluences are both in close proximity to the fort. River confluences had a special significance for the Gaulish legions and auxiliaries who were stationed in North Britain during the Roman occupation. Roman altars with inscriptions to Mars Condatis have been found in the Tees and Wear valleys. (Note: MacKillop – ...Celtic Mythology Condatis..."A god worshipped in Roman occupied Britain, much associated with the confluence of rivers..."His shrines have been found between the Tyne and Tees rivers..."His name is commemorated in many place names...) Similar altars are normally found at the confluence of rivers – for example, the Cong Burn–Wear confluence near Chester-le-Street – however others may have been disturbed or removed, especially by antiquarians and collectors. The inscription Mars Condatis pairs a Roman deity (Mars) with a native British deity (Condatis) per the usual Roman practice of interpretatio romana. The name Tutta may derive from the Gaulish deity Teutates (or Tūtatus).

=== The bridge ===
The current bridge was built in 1773 to replace the one destroyed by the great flood of 1771. It was designed by John Carr for John Sawry Morritt, father of John Bacon Sawrey Morritt. Morritt also paid for the Abbey Bridge to be built in the same year.

=== Mail coach ===
Before the arrival of the railways in the 1850s, Greta Bridge had been an important overnight stop for the London to Carlisle coach. Overnight passengers and visitors would stay at one of the three coaching inns in the village. (Note: The Morritt Hotel – Days of the Mail Coach..."Through the 17th Century ...Greta Bridge was the second overnight stop for the London-Carlisle mail coach, bringing with it a considerable number of visitors...."There were three inns at Greta Bridge, including The George, and the New Inn, which is now Thorpe Farm...)

1. The Morritt Arms.
2. The George.
3. George and New Inn (now Thorpe Grange Farmhouse). (Note: Rudd – The Discovery of Teesdale..."Greta Bridge was an important staging post...in 1804 there were two inns...but by 1834 a third had been built a few hundred yards to the south-east) (Note: Historic England..."house is claimed to be the former George and New Inn, at which Charles Dickens stayed while researching Nicholas Nickleby.)

Wordsworth and his wife Mary were regular users of the mail coach in order to travel over from the Lakes to visit Mary's parents at Stockton-on-Tees. (Note: Rudd – The Discovery of Teesdale..."In a letter of 1833 William Wordsworth's daughter Dora suggests that Rokeby was a popular stop on the journey to see the Hutchinsons, then living at Stockton-on-Tees ...) (Note: Mary's parents had moved to Stockton-on-Tees from their farm on the Sockburn Peninsula – near the Tees.)

=== Romantic arts and tourism ===
During the eighteenth century Teesdale became a popular destination for romantic artists, poets and writers, who inspired others to follow. In 1799 William Wordsworth and Samuel Taylor Coleridge explored the area around Greta Bridge, after visiting Mary Hutchinson at Sockburn. (Note: Rudd – The Discovery of Teesdale..."Having stayed overnight at Piercebridge, Wordsworth, Coleridge and Cottle explored the area around Greta Bridge...) Mary lived on her parents farm on the Sockburn Peninsula – the peninsula created by a tight meander of the River Tees. Wordsworth married Mary in 1802, and the couple often travelled over from the Lakes to visit Mary's parents, using the mail coach to Greta Bridge, and stopping over at Rokeby.

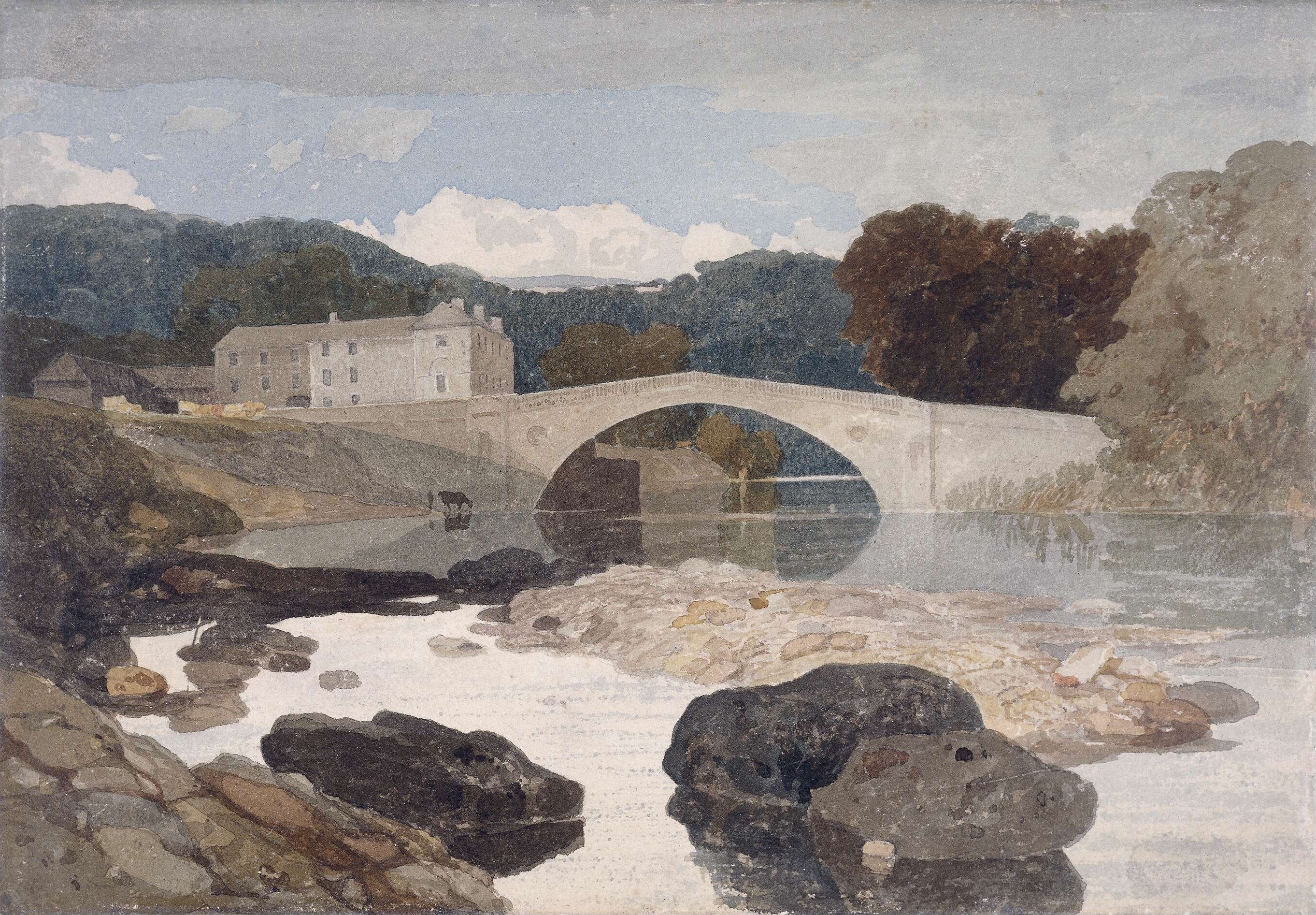
Greta Bridge (1805), British Museum.

The romantic painter John Sell Cotman (1782 – 1842) first explored the Greta Bridge area in 1805 when 23 years old. He had been invited by the Cholmeley family to stay with them at Rokeby Hall. (Note: Rudd – The Discovery of Teesdale..."The owner of Rokeby, J B S Morritt, had readily agreed to the 22-year-old Francis Cholmeley's request that Cotman accompany him on a visit to his estate...) Cotman's best known work from his early period is the watercolour Greta Bridge (1805), now in the British Museum, which he painted from sketches made during his visit to Rokeby Park. (Note: Rudd – The Discovery of Teesdale..."The best known Greta watercolours are two versions of Greta Bridge made from a pencil sketch that has survived...In the two watercolours, made in 1805 and 1810...) The view is from the south of the bridge looking north, the Morritt Arms is shown on the left side of the bridge. The profile shown at the top of the bridge is noticeably different from that of the actual bridge – it shows a higher more pronounced summit – whereas the actual bridge has a gentle curved profile. It has been suggested that this was influenced by the geometry of the earlier bridge that had been destroyed in the great flood of 1771. (Note: Rudd – The Discovery of Teesdale..."Interestingly, although Cotman's sketch shows the curved parapet of the bridge, for both watercolours he returns to the pre-1771 triangular shape depicted in an 18th century painting hanging in Rokeby Hall...) The foreground is dominated by huge boulders – possibly swept down during the great flood.

Walter Scott's poem The Lady of the Lake, published 1810, had been hugely successful and placed the Loch Katrine in the Trossachs area firmly on the tourist map, boosting the economy of local towns. When Scott announced to John Bacon Sawrey Morritt that he was planning to write a similar poem based around Teesdale, Morritt offered his services as a guide, possibly anticipating how it might spark a wealthy tourist trade, and boost the local economy. (Note: Rudd – The Discovery of Teesdale..."Morritt reminds Scott of their rides up Deepdale and along the Tees to Cotherstone...Rokeby's owner offers his services as a guide, and hints at the tourist trade Scott's poem is likely to bring:..."I shall raise the rent of my inn at Greta Bridge...I hear that the people of Callander have made a fortune by you...) Scott's poem Rokeby, published 1813, was also hugely successful and did attract many new visitors to Teesdale. (Note: Warwick – River Tees......"The literary work that did most to popularise the natural beauties of Teesdale...was by Walter Scott ...)

== See also ==
- Bowes Museum
- List of places in County Durham
- List of Roman place names in Britain
- Roman sites in Great Britain

== Sources ==
- Higham, Nick (1986). The Northern Counties to AD 1000. Longman. ISBN 0-582-49276-9.
- MacKillop, James (2004). Oxford Dictionary of Celtic Mythology. Oxford University Press. ISBN 0-19-860967-1.
- Oliver, Neil (2012). A History of Ancient Britain. Weidenfeld & Nicolson. ISBN 978-0753828861.
- Rabbitts, Paul; Rabbitts, David (2022). Cotherstone: A Village in Teesdale. Amberley Publishing. ISBN 978-1398113831.
- Rudd, Michael D. C. (2007). The Discovery of Teesdale. Phillimore & Co Ltd. ISBN 978-1860774539.
- Warwick, Tosh; Parker, Jenny (2016). River Tees: From Source to Sea. Amberley Publishing. ISBN 978-1445634876.
- Watts, Victor (2007). The Cambridge Dictionary of English Place-Names. Cambridge University Press. ISBN 978-0-521-16855-7.
