= RAF Needs Oar Point =

Former Royal Air Force advanced landing ground in Hampshire, England

RAF Needs Oar Point
- Near Lymington, Hampshire in England
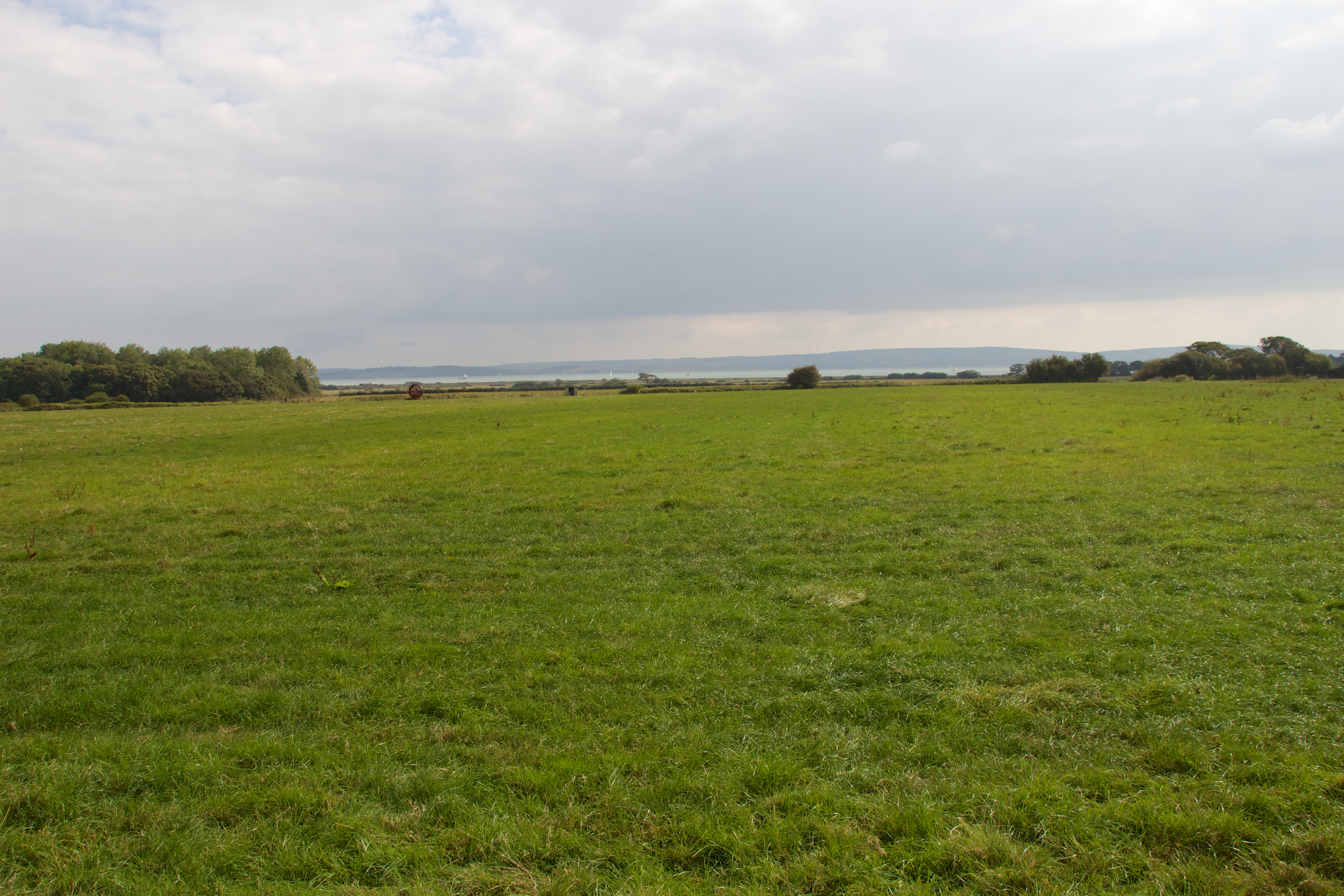
- The location of the airfield in 2014

Site information
- Type: RAF Advanced landing ground
- Code: NI
- Owner: Air Ministry
- Operator: Royal Air Force
- Controlled by: RAF Fighter Command; Second Tactical Air Force * No. 84 Group RAF

Location
- Shown within Hampshire RAF Needs Oar Point (the United Kingdom)
- Coordinates: 50°46′23″N 1°25′53″W

Site history
- Built: 1944
- Built by: No. 5004 Airfield Construction Squadron RAF
- In use: April 1944 - November 1944
- Battles/wars: European theatre of World War II

Airfield information
- Elevation: 9 metres (30 ft) AMSL
Runways
Direction	Length and surface
00/00	Sommerfeld Tracking
00/00	Sommerfeld Tracking

Royal Air Force Needs Oar Point or more simply RAF Needs Oar Point is a former Royal Air Force advanced landing ground located near Lymington in Hampshire, England. Constructed in 1943 it was used from April 1944 as a base for Hawker Typhoon fighter-bomber squadrons of No. 146 Wing of the 2nd Tactical Air Force supporting the Normandy landings. All four operational squadrons moved to RAF Hurn for two weeks before moving on to France by July 1944 and the airfield was returned to agricultural use in 1945.

== Units and aircraft ==
- No. 193 (Fellowship of the Bellows) Squadron RAF with Hawker Typhoon IBs from 11 April to 3 July 1944.
- No. 197 Squadron RAF with Hawker Typhoon IBs from 10 April 1944 to 3 July 1944.
- No. 257 (Burma) Squadron RAF with Hawker Typhoon IBs from 10 April 1944 to 2 July 1944
- No. 266 (Rhodesia) Squadron RAF with Hawker Typhoon IBs from 10 April 1944 to 29 June 1944; it temporarily moved to RAF Snaith in Yorkshire between 27 April 1944 and 6 May 1944.
- No. 146 Airfield Headquarters RAF (1944)
- No. 413 (Polish) Repair and Salvage Unit was based on the airfield between 19 June 1944 and 21 July 1944.
- No. 1318 Mobile Wing RAF Regiment
- No. 2898 Squadron RAF Regiment
