= RAF Bowes Moor =

Former Royal Air Force munitions site in County Durham, England

RAF Bowes Moor
- Bowes, County Durham in England
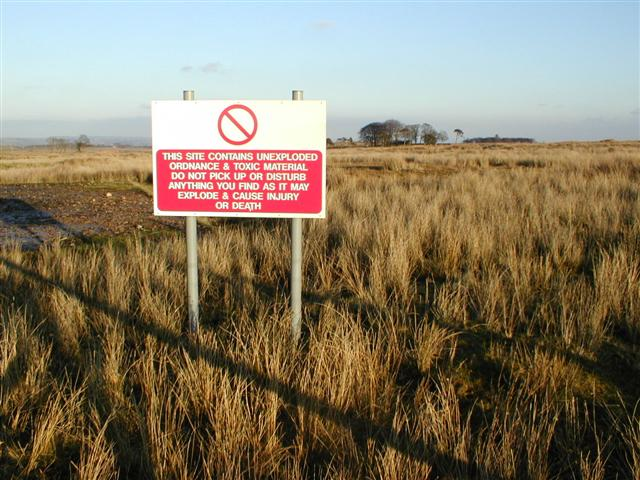
- Sign at RAF Bowes Moor

Site information
- Type: Military
- Code: 588
- Owner: Air Ministry; MoD
- Operator: Royal Air Force
- Controlled by: Royal Air Force (1941–1947)
- Open to the public: Limited

Location
- Location within County Durham
- Coordinates: 54.526°N 2.030°W
- Grid reference: NY982145
- Area: 564 acres (228 ha)

Site history
- Built: 1941
- In use: 1947
- Fate: Derelict

Garrison information
- Occupants: No. 81 Maintenance Unit

RAF Bowes Moor was a chemical warfare agent (CWA) storage site run by the Royal Air Force during and after the Second World War. The site was to the north of the village of Bowes in what is now County Durham, England. The Bowes Moor geographical feature runs from the north to the south west of the village. The Royal Air Force used the site to stock its chemical weapon supply, most of which was disposed of in situ by burning. The site, which closed in 1947, is known for the dangerous chemicals which leached into the soil.

The only unit to have officially worked at Bowes Moor was No. 81 Maintenance Unit RAF (1941–1947). The Bowes Loop of the Pennine Way goes through the site.

== History ==
=== 1940s ===
The site was opened in December 1941 as an open storage location for all the Royal Air Force's chemical weapons inventory. It was located at Stoney Keld, Tute Hill, to the north of the village of Bowes, in the North Riding of Yorkshire. The site is now in County Durham, being transferred there in 1974 although the Ministry of Defence still groups the site with others in North Yorkshire. RAF Bowes Moor was built on the moorland between Bowes and Cotherstone, which was used extensively for training in the Second World War, with infantry and tank training taking place. The only RAF unit known to have been based at Bowes Moor was No. 81 Maintenance Unit, which was part of No. 42 Group, RAF. The site was also used by the Army Air Forces during the Second World War when elements of the VIII Air Force Service Command worked at the site.

It is known that mustard gas, phosgene and lewisite were stored at the site during the time that it was operational. The need for the site was precipitated by other munitions stores which were short on space because of the war effort. Also, a few accidents in other bomb stores, such as at Llanberis and Harpur Hill in Derbyshire, led to a belief that storing chemical weapons underground was inherently unsafe. A decision was taken to locate all the chemical warfare agents in one location; Bowes Moor was selected due to it being fairly remote, but having the capability of a rail link (from the South Durham and Lancashire Union Railway). The site covered 564 acres (228 ha) and had an estimated 17,000 tonnes (19,000 tons) of ordnance storage. Originally, the weapons were left piled up in the open with tarpaulins on them, but sheep ate the covers which dislodged the weapons and so hardstandings were built to house the weapons. Most weapons were then stored inside buildings, except the 250 lb (110 kg) bombs which were left outside, with sheep-proof fencing erected around the whole site. Specialist gas-proof air-raid shelters were constructed for those who worked at the site, in case of an aerial bombardment.

The favoured method of disposal of mustard gas on site was by burning, something that the British military had been doing in occupied Germany in 1945. However, this was sometimes ineffective as it produced large clouds of smoke and some of the agent contaminated the ground on the site. As the war in Europe and the Far East came to a close, more and more chemical weapons were sent to RAF Bowes Moor; in October 1945 alone, almost 2,500 tonnes (2,800 tons) of bombs were shipped in from other locations. This meant that the rate of disposal was similarly accelerated. Experiments were conducted in the best way to dispose of the bombs, including decanting the poisonous liquid, but this method was found to be too time-consuming and also had a greater danger to the operatives carrying out the work. The process used in Germany was adopted, whereby the CWAs would be stacked up with incendiary bombs, and then tracer rounds from a Sten gun were fired into the pile, causing an explosion. Even so, this left too much of an arsenal to deal with, and a good deal of tonnage from the Bowes Moor site was disposed of at sea in Operation Sandcastle. In January 1946, scientists and a veterinary surgeon from Porton Down travelled to the site to oversee the burning and analyse cattle found dead that had grazed on the area.

=== Recent history ===
In 1997, RAF Bomb Disposal teams discovered stocks of mustard gas which should have been destroyed in the 1950s. The site was being prepared for sale to a private buyer.

In 2007, the MoD initiated Project Cleansweep, a programme to test 14 sites with evidence of CWAs being used at that location, with Bowes Moor being one of four in the north of England. The local council welcomed the clean-up, pointing out that the Pennine Way runs "..through this poison gas factory with skull and crossbones signs, and it's really something that should be cleared up". The study determined that while the site did have chemicals such as arsenic in the soil, the levels were low enough not to harm humans. It also found that some of the redundant buildings were crushed after the war, and the hardcore remains were used to line the landfill and roads on the site.
