= River Greta, Durham =

River in County Durham, England

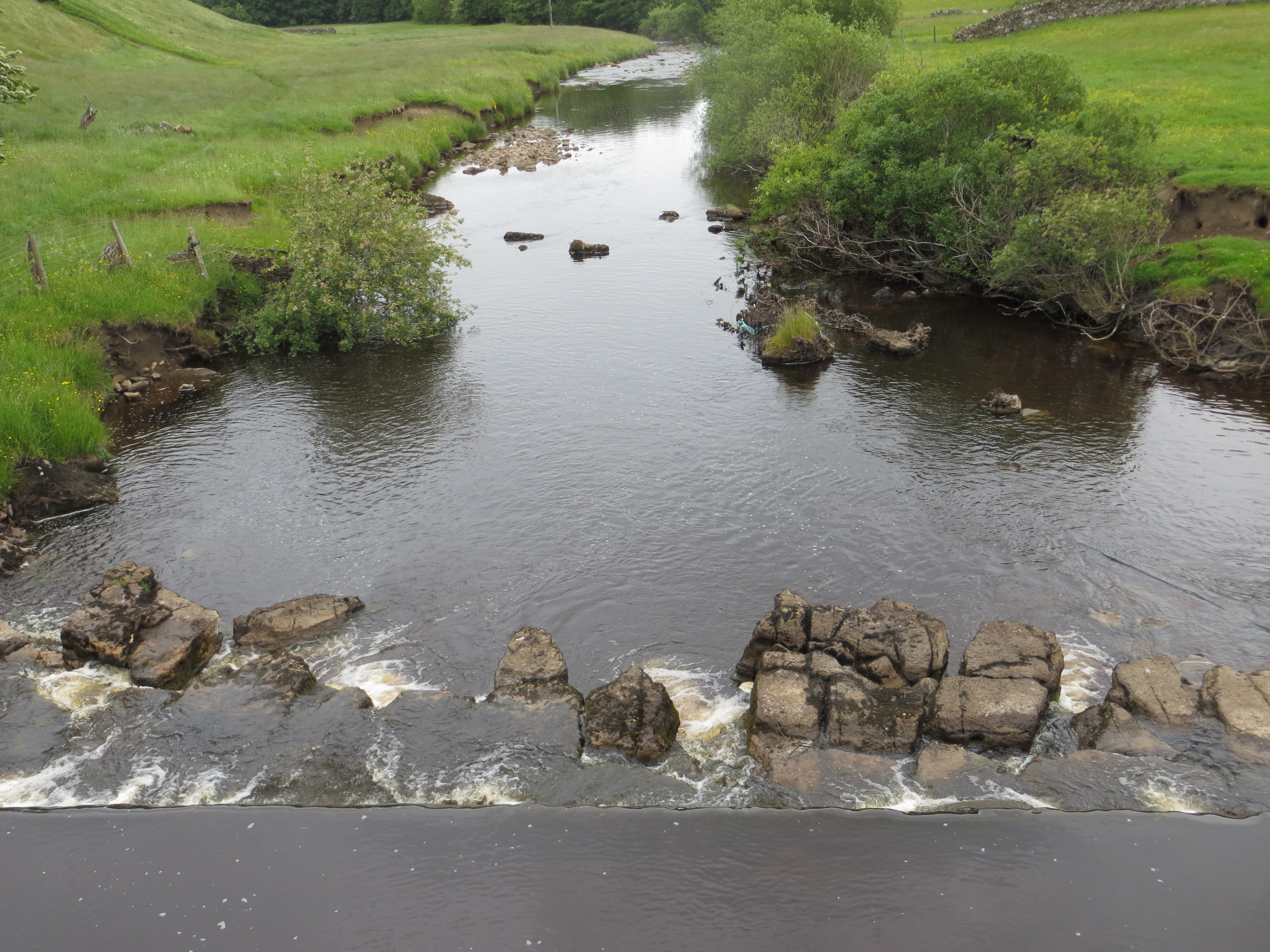
River Greta near Bowes

The River Greta is a river in County Durham, England. It is a tributary of the River Tees and flows through the northern part of the old North Riding of Yorkshire. The name "Greta" derives from the Old Norse "Griótá", meaning "stony stream".

The river rises in the Pennines on Stainmore and drains Spittal Ings, Roper Castle (or Round Table) and Beldoo Moss to the east of Moudy Mea, before running east through Bowes Moor and Stainmore Forest. It is joined at West Charity Farm by Sleightholme Beck, its main tributary, which runs north-east from its source between Bog Moss and Sleightholme Moor where it is formed by the confluence of Dry Gill and Frumming Beck. From there, the river travels through Bowes, where, close to the site of the Roman fort of Lavatris it is crossed by the Pennine Way.

The area through which the Greta flows was a favourite haunt of artists, notably John Sell Cotman and J. M. W. Turner. There are also many historic sites adjacent to the river including cup and ring carvings on Barningham Moor, an early Norman Keep at Scargill, the site of a Roman shrine on Scargill Moor (now in the Bowes Museum) and a 17th century watermill at Brignall (converted to a holiday cottage).

== Settlements (from source) ==
- Spital (54.509°N 2.076°W)
- Bowes
- Gilmondby
- Scargill
- Barningham
- Greta Bridge (54.513°N 1.865°W)

== Tributaries (from source) ==
- Ay Gill
- Red Gill
- Burnt Gill
- Sleightholme Beck
  - Dry Gill
    - White Stone Gill
      - Polly Gutter
      - Ease Gill
        - Rea Gill
        - Great Wygill
          - Back Gutter
  - Frumming Beck
    - Mirk Fell Gill
- Hug Gill

(Village of Bowes)

- Eller Beck
- Thwaite Beck
  - Seavy Sike
- Gregory Beck
- Gill Beck
  - Stang Gill
  - Woodclose Gill
- Tutta Beck
