= Barningham, County Durham =

Village in County Durham, England

Coordinates: 54.48959°N 1.86942°W

Barningham
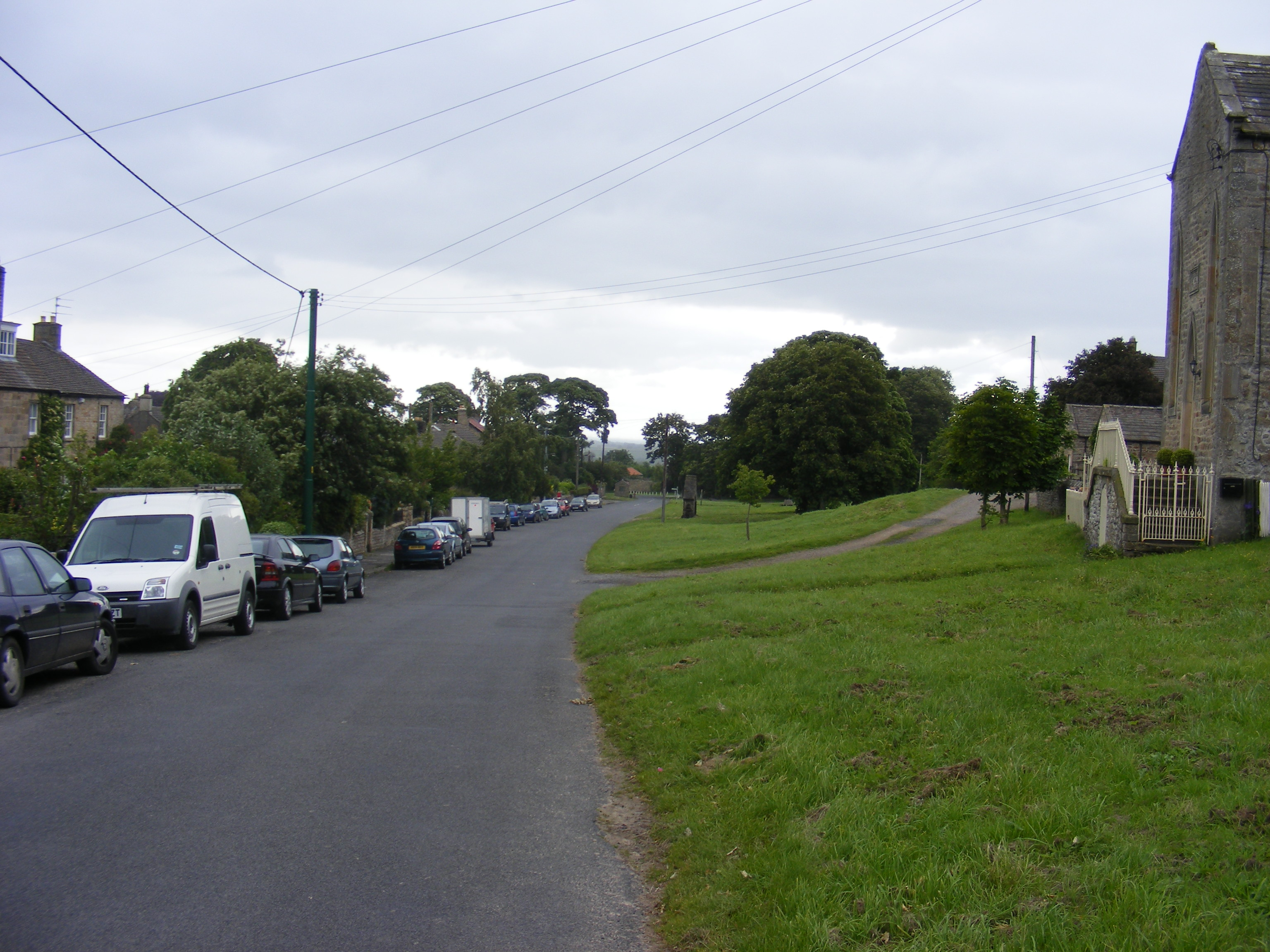
- Barningham

- Location within County Durham
- Population: 241 (Including Scargill.2011)
- OS grid reference: NZ08521045
- Unitary authority: County Durham
- Ceremonial county: County Durham
- Region: North East
- Country: England
- Sovereign state: United Kingdom
- Post town: Richmond
- Postcode district: DL11
- Police: Durham
- Fire: County Durham and Darlington
- Ambulance: North East
- UK Parliament: Bishop Auckland

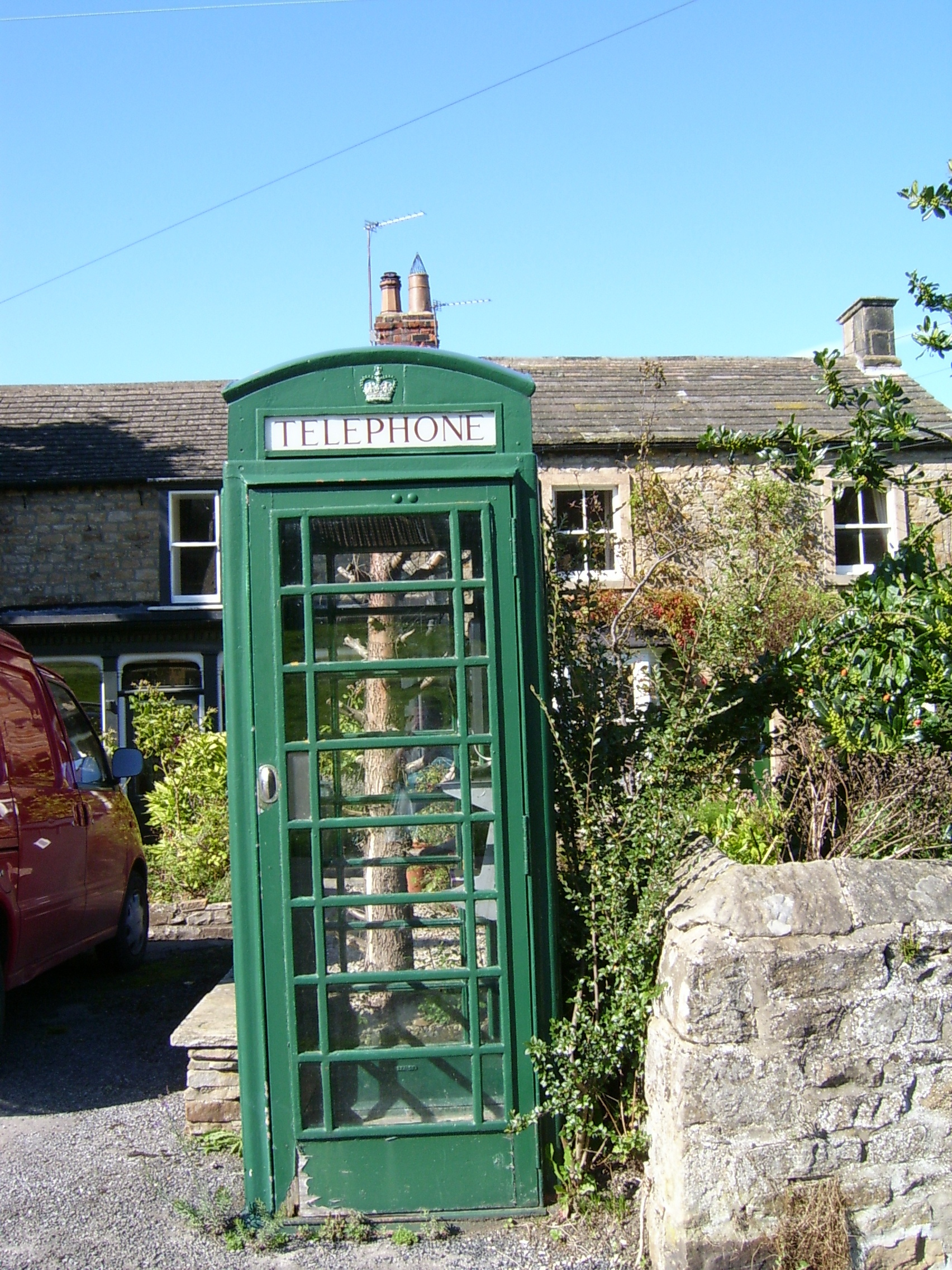
An unusual green telephone box is situated in the village

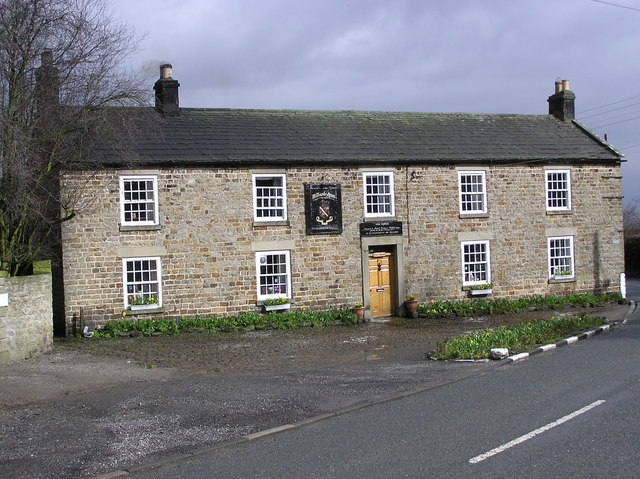
The Milbank Arms

Barningham is a village in County Durham, in the Pennines of England.

== History ==
Barningham is listed in the Domesday Book under the Gilling Wapentake (later Gilling West and part of the Honour of Richmond) of Yorkshire as a property owned in 1066 by an Anglo-Saxon lord, Thor, before the Norman conquest; by 1086, the ownership had transferred to Enisant Musard, with Count Alan of Brittany as a tenant.

The village, along with the wider and former Startforth Rural District, was formerly governed under the North Riding and was transferred to County Durham's governance in 1974.

== Amenities ==
Barningham is a tranquil conservation village of around 60 houses. It has a large village green, a church, a stately home occupied by a local landowning baronet, a village hall used by local interest groups and a recently restored pub. It is on the edge of moors stretching westwards to Cumbria and is a good base for walking the local dales and hills. The village has an enthusiastic local history society which runs a website and offers assistance to anyone trying to trace ancestors from the area.

== Notable buildings ==
Barningham Park has been the home of the Milbank family since 1690. It is a Grade II* listed country house dating from the 15th century set in a 7000-acre estate.

The Milbank Arms is a Grade II listed public house built in the early 19th century and extensively rebuilt in 2019. It was formerly on the Campaign for Real Ale's National Inventory of Historic Pub Interiors.
