= Ludworth, County Durham =

Coordinates: 54.766°N 1.437°W

Ludworth
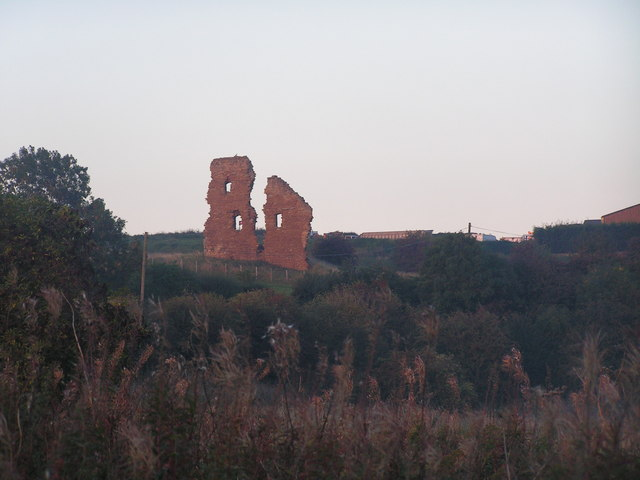
- Ludworth Tower

- Location within County Durham
- OS grid reference: NZ363413
- Unitary authority: County Durham
- Ceremonial county: County Durham
- Region: North East
- Country: England
- Sovereign state: United Kingdom
- Post town: DURHAM
- Postcode district: DH6
- Dialling code: 01429
- Police: Durham
- Fire: County Durham and Darlington
- Ambulance: North East
- UK Parliament: City of Durham

Ludworth is a pit village in County Durham, England situated between Durham and Peterlee. Ludworth is 6.2 miles from Durham City Centre and 5.4 miles from Peterlee.

It consists of just over 350 houses in three main housing estates (Barnard Avenue, Moor Crescent and Springfield Meadows) and a few smaller streets.

Ludworth has a combined post office and community shop, a primary school, a community centre, a small park and a printers.

The village used to have a church, two Methodist chapels and a fish shop, most of which were destroyed in a fire. The last public house in Ludworth, The Queen's Head, has been closed since before 2009. The nearest pubs are now in Shadforth and Thornley.

There are no supermarkets in Ludworth although most supermarkets that offer a delivery service will deliver to resident's homes.

Residents who need anything more than the small Post Office and village shop offers, when shopping locally, rely on Peterlee, Dragonville Industrial Estate (near to Sherburn, County Durham), Durham City Centre, Hartlepool or smaller shops in neighbouring villages such as Sherburn and Wheatley Hill.

The 24 Arriva bus service runs, in both directions, half hourly during the day between Durham City Centre and Hartlepool, except on Sundays when it runs hourly. There are no late evening services in either direction on Sundays. There is no railway station.

Ludworth Tower was originally a medieval manor house, founded by the de Ludworth family. In 1422, Thomas Holden added a rectangular pele tower, when he was granted licence to crenellate his manorial complex, by Cardinal Langley. The only surviving remains are the barrel-vaulted basement, the three storey west wall and fragments of a first floor spiral stair in the south wall. The remains can be seen on the left as you come into the village from Shadforth and are contained within Tower Farm.

== Economy ==
Ludworth used to be a mining community. The "Low Main" and the "Main Coal" were the seams worked at Ludworth, giving an output at one time of 400 tons per day, and where employment was given to over 300 hands.

=== Coal mining accidents ===
34 people have been named as having died while working in the colliery:

Addison, Matthew, 03 Mar 1859, aged 10, Trapper, crushed by tub and pony

Anderson, Irvine, 24 Dec 1844, aged 29, who, with two others, was ascending Ludworth Pit in a corf. When it was about seven fathoms from the bottom of the shaft, it struck against the side and he was thrown out. He was recovered from the bottom of the shaft and taken home, but died three hours later from a fractured skull. The inquest into his death was held on Tuesday, 24 December

Arkley, Thomas, 26 Dec 1899, aged 64, Screenman, fell down dead from heart disease while at his work.

Atkin, Richard, 07 Aug 1924, aged 32, Pumpman, fell down shaft, Buried: St. Cuthbert's Churchyard, Shadforth

Berry, James, 12 Dec 1855, thrown down the shaft

Brown, William Michael, 21 Feb 1902, aged 57, Master Shifter, deceased signalled to the winding engineman to take the cage from the 5/4 to main coal seam and then attempted to get into the cage, but the engineman, not knowing there was no onsetter there, dropped the cage at once, and Brown was caught and killed

Craig, William, 6 May 1880, aged 40, Deputy, while attempting to draw a set of chocks in longwall he knocked out a wedge, and immediately a fall took place; he neglected to set a prop, although told by another deputy to do so, as the stone was found to be bad

Elsdon, Joseph, 10 Jan 1845, aged 26, Sinker, fell down shaft

Farrow, Joseph, 01 Mar 1848, Deputy Overman, he was crushed to death when part of the roof fell on him

Ferry, Joseph, Feb 1848, killed by a fall of stone from the roof

Fletcher, John, 20 Mar 1883, aged 31, Hewer, fall of stone while working in a jud, a stone fell out next to goaf

Gibson, George, 23 Apr 1852, aged 35, in cage which fell down the North Pit shaft [The Durham Chronicle - 02/04/1852], Buried: St. Cuthbert's Churchyard, Shadforth

Haddick, Craik, 10 Jan 1845, aged 33, Sinker, fell down shaft

Hedley, Thomas, 23 Apr 1852, aged 20, in cage which fell down the North Pit shaft [The Durham Chronicle - 02/04/1852], Buried: St. Cuthbert's Churchyard, Shadforth

Hedley, William, 23 Apr 1852, aged 24, in cage which fell down the North Pit shaft [The Durham Chronicle - 02/04/1852], Buried: St. Cuthbert's Churchyard, Shadforth

Hunter, John, 10 Jan 1845, aged 28, Sinker, fell down shaft

Iley, William, 22 Feb 1878, (accident: 14 Feb 1878), aged 30, Heap Keeper, leg badly crushed between waggons while passing between them

Johnson, Ralph, 10 Jun 1859, aged 14, Horse Driver, killed by a fall of stone

Johnson, Thomas, 04 Sep 1852, aged 11, Driver, fell off the limmers attached to a laden coal-tub, his head was jammed between the off-side fore wheel and the tramplate.

Justice, James, 05 Jun 1850, aged 66, Furnaceman, he had gone to work at 4p.m. and was found on the following morning lying 40 yards from the furnace with 'a stone of considerable weight on his legs' — his head was also injured; the roof in that area was 16 feet high

Kyle, Edward, 31 Jan 1916, aged 53, Air Compressor Minder, he started his shift at 6 a.m. and ten hours later was found dead lying on the floor of the air compressor engine house

Lonsdale, William, 24 Nov 1861, aged 31, Shifter, fall of stone on horse road

Moor, Thomas, 13 Jan 1847, aged 26, Banksman, hit by part of the pulley wheel in a cage overwind

Morton, George, 18 Sep 1846, aged 11, Trapper, He left his door open and went to assist another lad to push a tub of coals up an incline. The cottril by which the pony was attached to the tub slipped, causing the tub to run back. Morton was jammed between a prop and another tub and died instantly

Porter, John, 07 Nov 1874, aged 64, Wasteman, crushed by cage at pit bottom, Buried: St. Cuthbert's Churchyard, Shadforth

Robson, John, 08 Mar 1899, aged 63, Hewer, Died while working at the coal face from heart disease.

Robson, Joseph, 10 Jan 1845, aged 28, Sinker, fell down shaft

Rose, Richard, 02 Oct 1878, aged 37, Labourer, severely crushed by tub at tip end by pony running away and upsetting a tub of stone on him; he died next day

Stephenson, Robert, 22 Oct 1860, aged 33, Hewer, killed by a fall of stone

Sweeny, Anthony, 18 Nov 1876, aged 12, Trapper, crushed between cage and flat sheets by getting into cage while it was in motion, contrary to rules

Taylor, John, 30 Jul 1893, aged 57, Labourer, Died in hospital to-day from alleged injuries received to foot while emptying a tub of stone on refuse heap a month ago. No confirmatory evidence; it appears to be an old wound.

Watson, William, 23 Apr 1852, aged 11, in cage which fell down the North Pit shaft [The Durham Chronicle - 02/04/1852], Buried: Thornley

White, Robert, 28 Oct 1877, (accident: 25 Oct 1877), aged 62, Mason, injury to spine by falling from scaffold while repairing smithy roof

Wilkinson, John, 13 Oct 1846, aged 12, while standing waiting to be drawn up from the High Main Coal seam at Ludworth Pit on 13 October, John Wilkinson, aged 12, was accidentally knocked through a hole in the brattice by the onsetter, who was taking a tub out of the cage. The boy fell down the opposite section of the shaft, a distance of about 10 fathoms, and was killed.
