= Bowes =

Village in County Durham, England

Coordinates: 54.516°N 02.009°W

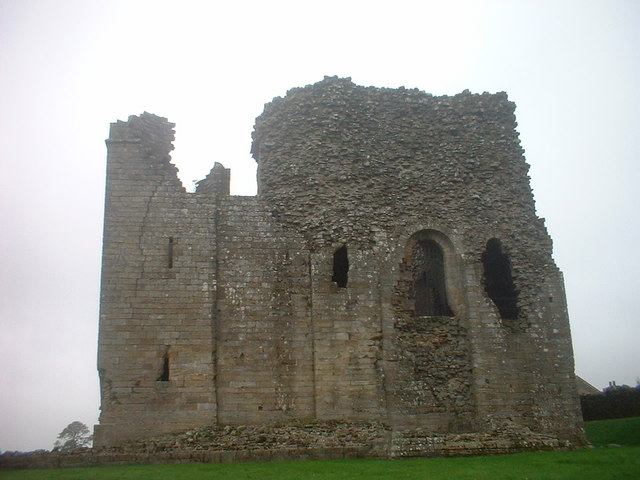
- Bowes Castle

- Location within County Durham
- Population: 471 (2011)
- OS grid reference: NY995135
- Civil parish: Bowes
- Unitary authority: County Durham
- Ceremonial county: Durham
- Region: North East
- Country: England
- Sovereign state: United Kingdom
- Post town: BARNARD CASTLE
- Postcode district: DL12
- Dialling code: 01833
- Police: Durham
- Fire: County Durham and Darlington
- Ambulance: North East
- UK Parliament: Bishop Auckland

Bowes is a village and civil parish in County Durham, England. Located in the Pennine hills, it is situated close to Barnard Castle. It is built around the medieval Bowes Castle. In 2021 the parish had a population of 442.

== Geography and administration ==
Bowes lies within the historic county boundaries of the North Riding of Yorkshire, but along with the rest of the former Startforth Rural District it was incorporated into the non-metropolitan county of Durham for administrative purposes on 1 April 1974, under the provisions of the Local Government Act 1972.

== History ==
The Roman name for Bowes was Lavatrae. A Roman fort was located there, which was re-used as the site for Bowes Castle.

The place-name 'Bowes' is first attested in a charter of 1148, where it appears as Bogas. This is the plural of the Old English boga meaning 'bow', probably signifying an arched bridge.

The village church is dedicated to St Giles.

The only pub in the village, the formerly named George Inn owned by the Railton family and now named The Ancient Unicorn, is reputed to be haunted by several ghosts. As of December 2025 it closed with no signs of reopening soon. This 17th-century coaching inn famously played host to Charles Dickens as he toured the local area. Dickens found inspiration in the village schools which he immortalised as Dotheboys Hall in Nicholas Nickleby, and the graves of two of the people who inspired characters portrayed by the great author can be seen in Bowes churchyard to this day. George Ashton Taylor, who died in 1822 aged 19, apparently inspired Dickens to create the character of Smike in the same novel. Just to the north of the village at Stoney Keld, is the site of the former RAF Bowes Moor, a chemical warfare agent storage site between 1941 and 1947. The Bowes Loop of the Pennine Way goes through the site.

The village is also home to possibly the smallest former working men's club in the country. Now known as Bowes Social Club, it is run by volunteers and is often used as a venue to raise money for local events.

== Education ==
Bowes has a single primary school at the centre of the village, Bowes Hutchinson's C of E (Aided) Primary School.

== Transport ==
=== Road ===
The A66 and A67 roads meet at Bowes. The village is currently served by 72 Bus, connecting Bowes with Barnard Castle twice daily.

=== Rail ===
From 1861 to 1962, the village was served by Bowes railway station.

== Notable people ==
Thomas Kipling (bap. 1745, d. 1822), dean of Peterborough, was born in Bowes.

John Bailey (1750–1819), mathematician and land surveyor was born in Bowes.

Richard Cobden (1804–65), manufacturer and politician, was schooled in Bowes.
