= Startforth Rural District =

Former local government area in the UK

Coordinates: 54.550°N 1.974°W

Startforth
- Area
  - 1894: 97,618 acres (395.05 km^{2})
  - 1974: 97,630 acres (395.1 km^{2})
- Population
  - 1901: 5,009
  - 1971: 3,404
- History
  - Created: 1894
  - Abolished: 1974
  - Succeeded by: Teesdale District
- Status: Rural district

Startforth Rural District was a rural district in the North Riding of the historic county of Yorkshire in the Pennines of northern England.

It was formed in 1894 under the Local Government Act 1894. It constituted the part of the Teesdale Rural Sanitary District that was in the North Riding (the rest being in County Durham).

In 1974, the district was abolished and became, for administrative purposes, part of the Teesdale district of the non-metropolitan county of County Durham.

It comprised the area south of the River Tees between Cow Green Reservoir and Gainford, and north of the modern administrative border between County Durham and North Yorkshire.

The area is hilly and fairly sparsely populated. Places within it included;

== Village ==
- Barningham
- Boldron
- Bowbank
- Bowes
- Brignall
- Cotherstone
- Gilmonby
- Grassholme
- Greta Bridge
- Hutton Magna
- Holwick
- Hunderthwaite
- Hury
- Lartington
- Mickleton
- Ovington
- Romaldkirk
- Scargill
- Startforth
- Thringarth
- Wycliffe

== Dale ==
- Baldersdale
- Deep Dale
- Lunedale
- Teesdale (south side only)

== Reservoirs and lakes ==
- Balderhead
- Blackton
- Fish Lake
- Grassholme
- Hury
- Selset

== Fells and moors ==
- Barningham Moor
- Bowes Moor
- Cotherstone Moor
- Cronkley Fell
- Holwick Fell
- Hope Moor
- Hunderthwaite Moor
- Lune Moor
- Mickle Fell
- Scargill High Moor
- Sleightholme Moor

== Forests ==
- Lune
- Stainmore

== Rivers and becks ==
- River Balder
- Deepdale Beck
- River Greta

== Roads ==
- A66
- A67
- B6276
- B6277

The Pennine Way also passes through the area.
