= Balder Viaduct =

Railway viaduct over River Balder, England

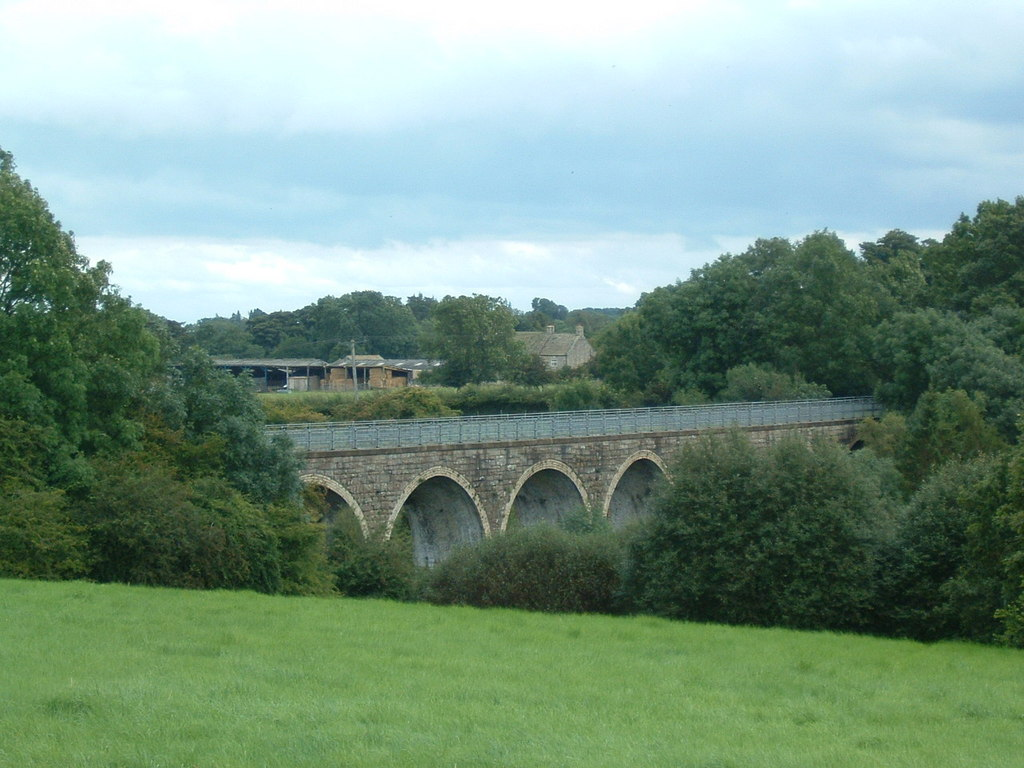
- Balder Viaduct on Tees Valley Railway Walk
- Coordinates: 54.5765°N 2.008°W
- OS grid reference: NY995201
- Carries: Footpath
- Crosses: River Balder
- Other name(s): Baldersdale Viaduct

Balder Viaduct is a former railway bridge near to the village of Cotherstone, in County Durham, England. The viaduct was part of the Tees Valley Railway between Barnard Castle and Middleton-in-Teesdale. It was opened in 1868 and closed in 1965. When it was open as a railway, the viaduct was in the old North Riding of Yorkshire. The viaduct is now open to walkers as part of the Tees Valley Railway Walk.

== History ==
The viaduct (and another structure on the same line over the River Lune) cost £5,000 each (equivalent to £568,000 in 2023) and were both designed by Alexander Nimmo and Thomas MacNay. Biddle described the viaduct as "a graceful, lofty grey limestone viaduct, nine thirty-foot segmental arches, 100 ft high, similar to the Lune Viaduct on the same line." The line and its viaducts opened to traffic in 1868, though in 1877, the whole parapet had to be reset due to one of the spandrils at the southern end giving way. Each of the arches is built with sandstone and finished with a row of firebricks. Some ten years after its opening, local rumour which extended to press reports, claimed the viaduct was unsafe. In 1879, the railway company asked the local newspaper (the Teesdale Mercury) to print an "unqualified contradiction" to these reports. Work had been undertaken the previous year to relay the permanent way due to the stress on the line along the viaduct and on to Romaldkirk, but this was due to the stone trains originating from the upper valley being heavier than anticipated.

In the 1980s, consideration had been given to demolishing the viaduct and replacing it with a footbridge set lower in the valley to offset annual maintenance costs which were projected to be over £5,000 per year. The viaduct has been fitted out with a smooth deck and railings, and is now part of the 6-mile (9.7 km) long Tees Valley Railway Walk. As the viaduct straddles the River Balder, and the narrow valley valley is known as Baldersdale, the bridge is sometime referred to as Baldersdale Viaduct.
