= Balderhead Reservoir =

Reservoir on the River Balder in County Durham, England

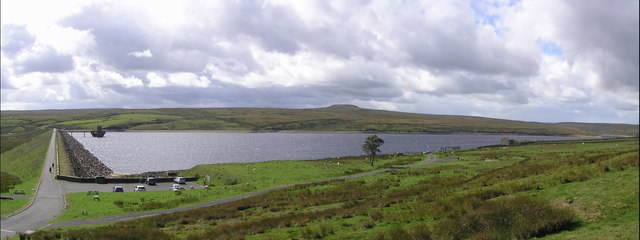

- Location within County Durham
- Location: County Durham, England
- Coordinates: 54°33′40″N 2°7′25″W
- Type: Reservoir
- Primary inflows: Moorland streams
- Primary outflows: Blackton Reservoir
- Catchment area: 5,140 acres (2,081 ha)
- Managing agency: Northumbrian Water
- Built: 1961
- First flooded: 1965
- Max. length: 1.77 mi (2.85 km)
- Max. width: 0.56 mi (0.9 km)
- Max. depth: 121 feet (37 m)
- Water volume: 507,914,900 cubic feet (14,382,549 m^{3})
- Surface elevation: 330 m (1,080 ft)

Balderhead Reservoir is a reservoir in Baldersdale, County Durham, England. It is one of a chain of three reservoirs on the River Balder, a tributary of the River Tees, which it joins at Cotherstone, about 5 miles (8 km) to the east. Balderhead Reservoir was commissioned by the Tees Valley and Cleveland Water Board (TVCWB) to increase water supply to Teesdale and Teesside.

== History ==
In 1956, an upsurge in the chemical industry on Teesside led ICI to negotiate increased water supply from the Tees Valley Water Board. The first site considered, Cow Green, was above Cauldron Snout and was in a sensitive habitat area, so Balderhead was built instead. The site was initially built as a direct supply route of water to Teesside, but later became a river-regulating reservoir, ensuring that water was available for the River Tees. Cow Green Reservoir was built later, though the approval process was protracted due to the loss of habitat for the Teesdale violet plant. Balderhead, which was originally in the North Riding of Yorkshire, (Note: The traditional boundary between County Durham and Yorkshire was the River Tees. Parts of Yorkshire were transferred into County Durham at the 1974 county boundary changes.) was approved for recreational activities by the Yorkshire Naturalists' Union in the same year that it was opened, there being no objections on wildfowl grounds.

Balderhead Reservoir was constructed upstream of two existing reservoirs, Blackton and Hury, and added 3,500 million imperial gallons (16,000,000 m^{3}) to the storage capacity on the River Balder. Construction of the Balderhead dam began in 1961 and was finished in 1964, with the reservoir being filled during 1965. The dam, which was built of compacted boulder clay and shale, is 157 feet (48 m) high and 3,000 feet (910 m) long, and became, at completion, the highest earth dam constructed in the British Isles.

When full, the reservoir can hold 507,914,900 cubic feet (14,382,549 m^{3}) and has an overall perimeter length of 5 miles (8 km). The catchment upstream of the reservoir is a mixture of rough grazing land and moorland which covers 12 miles (20 km). The water quality is assessed as moderate for ecology and good for its chemical composition.

Under the Water Act 1973, ownership of the TVCWB's reservoirs, which included the three Baldersdale reservoirs and two others — Selset and Grassholme — on the River Lune a short distance to the north, was transferred to the Northumbrian Water Authority (NWA). In 1989, NWA was privatised, and the reservoirs are now owned and operated by Northumbrian Water. All five reservoirs supply a water treatment works at Lartington, just south of Cotherstone.

Recreationally, the reservoir is used by the Teesdale Sailing and Watersports Club for windsurfing, canoeing and kite surfing.

== See also ==
- List of reservoirs and dams in the United Kingdom
