= Grains o' th' Beck Meadows =

Protected area in County Durham, England

- Location within County Durham
- Location: MAGiC MaP
- Nearest town: Barnard Castle
- Coordinates: 54°35′1″N 2°11′56″W
- Area: 12.3 ha (30 acres)
- Established: 1989
- Governing body: Natural England
- Website: Grains o' th' Beck Meadows SSSI

Grains o' th' Beck Meadows is a Site of Special Scientific Interest in the Teesdale district of south-west County Durham, England. It consists of three traditionally-managed hay meadows in Upper Lunedale, on the north bank of the River Lune, a little under 6 km upstream of the Selset Reservoir dam. The site is enclosed by the Lune Forest SSSI.

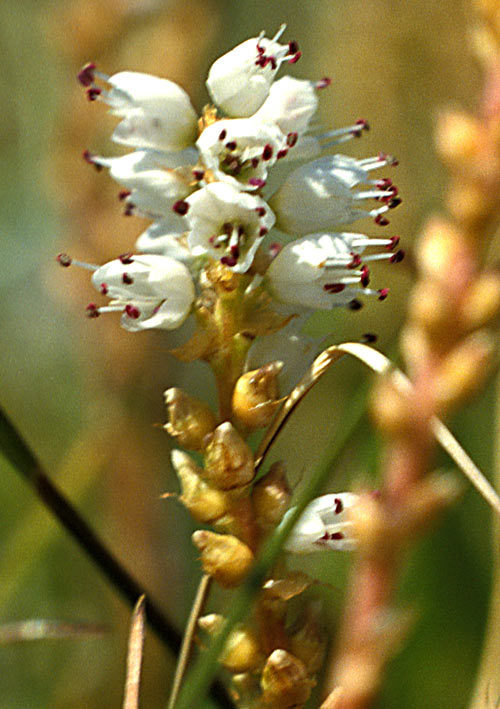
Alpine bistort, Polygonum viviparum

The site is important as preserving a rich assemblage of plant species, including some that are locally rare, in a habitat that is widely threatened by intensive agricultural practices.

Each of the fields includes areas that are regularly cut for hay, steep banks that are left uncut, and areas of impeded drainage, which together contain a diversity of species. Alpine bistort, Polygonum viviparum, which is rare in the Pennines, is found on the steep banks, and marsh-marigold, Caltha palustris, is abundant in the wetter patches.
