= Laithkirk =

Hamlet in County Durham, England

Coordinates: 54.61114°N 2.07274°W

Laithkirk is a small hamlet of three houses and a small church in County Durham, in England. All of the houses in Laithkirk are accessed by an unnamed road which connects the B6277 and the B6276. The hamlet is the final settlement (baring a caravan park) that lies in Lunedale, before the Lune river joins with the Tees. It is situated in Teesdale between Mickleton and Bowbank, near to Middleton-in-Teesdale.

== Laithkirk Church ==
Laithkirk Church is thought to have been restored in the 19th century from an older building.

The Church is known locally as the "Holy Barn" and a building has been on the site since at least the 1500s. The Church register begins in 1845. Next to the church is an old building which once housed the church's hearse. This fell into disuse after it was discovered that there were no horses strong enough to pull the hearse up the steep hill to the church. It is now used as a storage facility in private usage.
