= Hannah's Meadows =

Protected area in County Durham, England

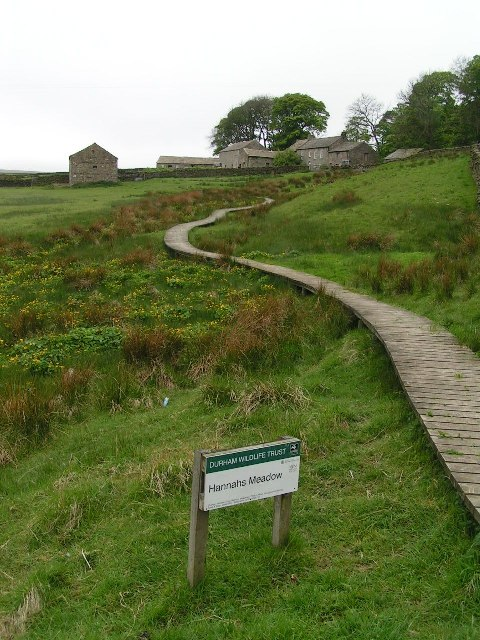
- Hannah's Meadow Nature Reserve at High Birk Hatt Farm

- Location within County Durham
- Location: MAGiC MaP
- Nearest town: Barnard Castle
- Coordinates: 54°33′44″N 2°6′5″W
- Area: 7.1 ha (18 acres)
- Established: 1989
- Governing body: Durham Wildlife Trust
- Website: Hannah's Meadows SSSI

Hannah's Meadows is a Site of Special Scientific Interest in the Teesdale district of south-west County Durham, England. It consists of three fields, located at Low Birk Hatt Farm, on the north side of Blackton Reservoir, in Baldersdale, some 5 miles (8.0 km) west of the village of Cotherstone. The site is named after Hannah Hauxwell, whose farm it was for over 50 years.

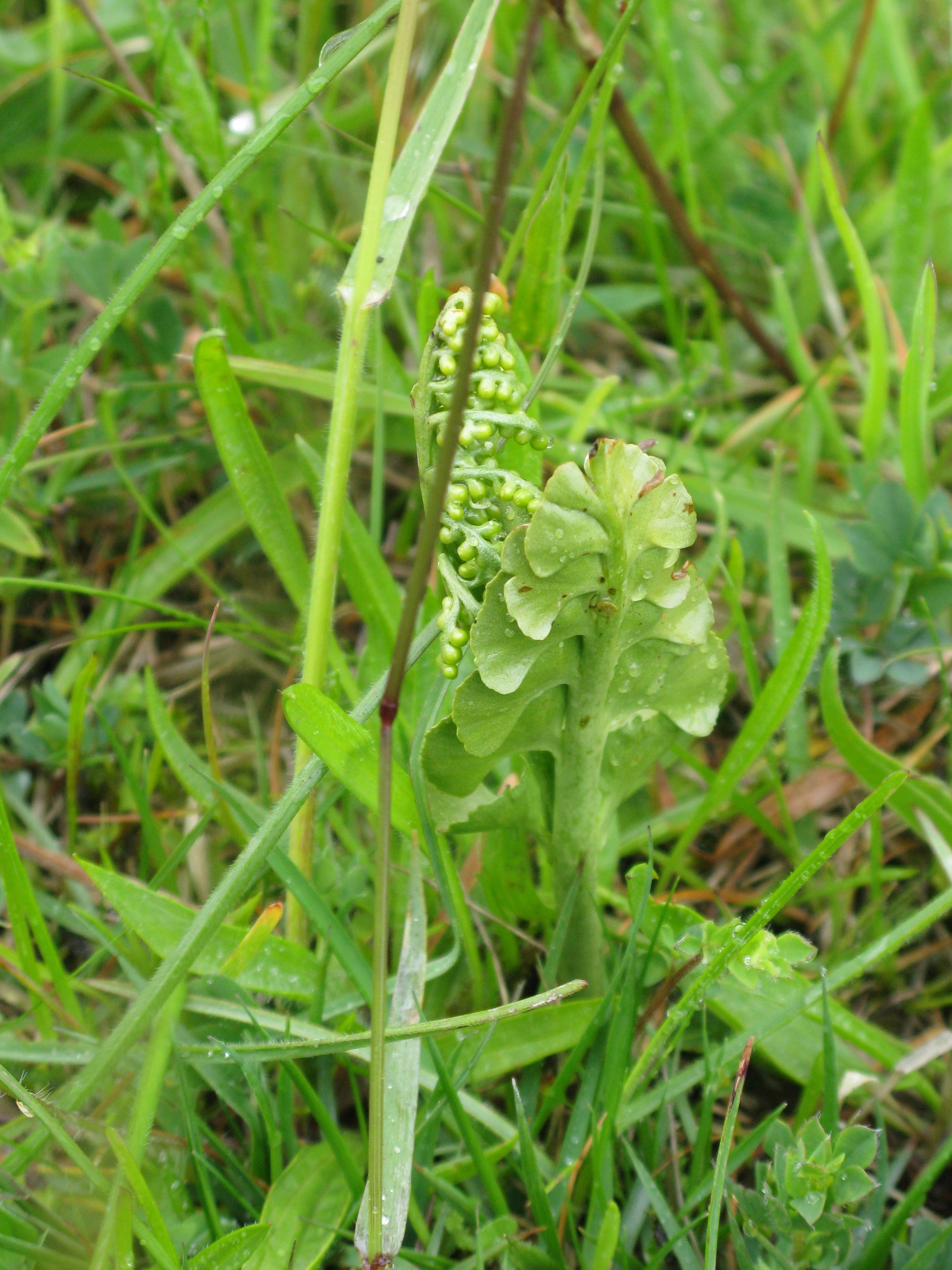
Moonwort, Botrychium lunaria

Because Miss Hauxwell employed traditional farming practices, with no re-seeding and no artificial fertilisers, the meadows are thought to be the least improved in upland Durham, and, as a result, have a very rich floral composition, including rare species such as frog orchid, Coeloglossum viride, moonwort, Botrychium lunaria, and adder's-tongue, Ophioglossum vulgatum.

In 1988, Low Birk Hatt Farm was purchased by the Durham Wildlife Trust, which now manages it as Hannah's Meadows nature reserve; one of the farm buildings—which are excluded from the SSSI—has been renovated as an unmanned visitor centre. In order to preserve the special characteristics of the site, the Trust continues to manage the farm in the traditional manner.

== Norse Mythology of Baldersdale ==
=== River Balder and Hunder Beck ===
The nature reserve is beside Blackton Reservoir and is close to the point where the River Balder and Hunder Beck meet and enter the reservoir.

The River Balder is named after the Norse god "Balder". (Note: The name ” Balder ” can be interpreted as ” bold ” or ” brave ”) The Hunder Beck is named after the Norse god "Thunder". (Note: People of Celtic origin found the ' Þ ' of the Old Norse language (pronounced ” th ” ) difficult, hence words that began ' th ' were often shortened to begin with just ' t ' or ' h ' (E.g. Number three - ” tree ” ): Thunder Beck; Hunder Beck; See also : Thynghowe: Thynghowe; hynger howe; Hanger Hill - c. 17th cent.)

According to Norse mythology, "Balder" and "Thunder" are both sons of the Norse god "Odin".

The River Balder rises from its source on Stainmore Common and flows in an easterly direction until it joins the River Tees near Cotherstone.

According to Roger of Wendover, the Viking ruler Eric Bloodaxe was betrayed and killed on Stainmore in AD 954, while on the run and after being expelled from York. (Note: Eric had previously been King of Northumbria (c. 947–948 and 952–954 ) during his more successful days) Following his death a famous poem was written about him called Eiríksmál.

==== Eiríksmál Verse 3 ====
In verse 3 the Norse god "Odin" exclaims to the legendary poet "Bragi": (Note: Old Norse version is from «Kulturformidlingen norrøne tekster og kvad» Norway) (Note: English version is translated from Danish using Google Translate)

" Hvat þrymr þar Bragi, sem þúsund bifisk eða mengi til mikit? "

" Bragi ! It's thundering of thousands of noises - or many peoples "

the legendary poet ” Bragi ” replies :

" Braka öll bekkþili, sem muni Baldr koma eptir í Óðins sali "

The tables are rumbling; is Balder back and again in Odin's halls?

=== Shacklesborough and Goldsborough Carr ===
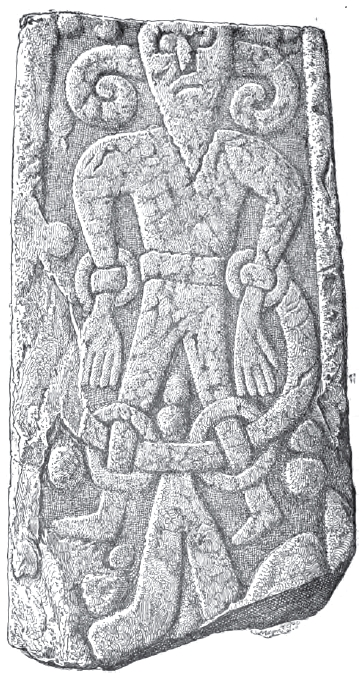
The Loki Stone - "The bondage of Loki"

Shacklesborough and Goldsborough Carr are isolated, flat-topped hills (Note: technically known as mesa) that dominate the Baldersdale landscape.

- Shacklesborough (454 metres (1,490 ft) is about 2 miles (3.2 km) South West of Hannah's Meadows
- Goldsborough Carr (389 metres (1,276 ft) is about 1 mile (1.6 km) South East of Hannah's Meadows

According to Norse Mythology, Balder (Note: Norse god ” Balder ” is a son of ” Odin ” and ” Frig ”) died after the mischief-maker Loki (Note: Norse god ” Loki ” is not related to ” Odin ”) tricked the blind Höðr (Note: Norse god ” Höðr ” is a son of ” Odin ” and ” Frig ”) into killing Balder with a spear made from mistletoe.

Odin was so outraged by the death of his son Balder, rather than killing Loki outright, he arranged for Loki to be bound and "shackled", (Note: Hence the name " Shacklesborough ") so that he would spend the remainder of his days (until Ragnarök at least) being tortured. The story is narrated in the poem Lokasenna. (Note: Loki - " The arrival of Thor and the bondage of Loki ") (Note: The Norse god Thor is also known as " Thunder ") (Note: Shacklesborough drains into Hunder ( " Thunder " ) beck .) (Note: The Hunder beck contains a series of waterfalls. The poem narrates how Loki disguised himself as a salmon and hid in the waterfall of Franangrsfors)

Several stone crosses or fragments have been found in the local area that are believed to depict "the bondage of Loki".

- The Loki Stone, St Stephen's Church, Kirkby Stephen, Cumbria, England. (Note: The Loki Stone - A 10th-century cross features a bound figure with horns)
- Loki, Archaeological record, Gainford, County Durham, England. (Note: A depiction of a similarly horned and round-shouldered figure was discovered in Gainford)
- Gosforth Cross, Cumbria, England.

The name Goldsborough is derived from a story about Loki in the poem Reginsmál. (Note: Loki states that they have now handed over the gold, and that gold is cursed as Andvari is, and that it will be the death of Hreiðmarr and Regin both.) (Note: Andvari had a magical ring Andvaranaut that could help with finding sources of gold)

=== See also ===
Examples of Norse Mythology in the North of England

- Bowder Stone, Borrowdale, Cumbria, England - "Balder's Steinn" or "Baldur's Steinn" . (Note: Local tradition suggests that the Bowder Stone was originally named after the Norse god Baldr) (Note: Old Norse steinn - " stone ") (Note: Cumbrian dialect Bowder - " boulder ")
- Roseberry Topping, North Yorkshire, England - "Othenesberg" (1119), "Othon's Bjarg", "Odin's Rock". (Note: Old Danish Othon - Norse god Odin) (Note: Old Norse bjarg - " rock ")

== Sources ==
=== Online ===
- Arthur, Ross G. "English-Old Norse Dictionary" (PDF). In Parentheses Publications.
- "Norse Mythology". norse-mythology.org.
- Eiríksmál in Old Norse from «Kulturformidlingen norrøne tekster og kvad» Norway.

=== Books ===
- Arthur, Ross G. (2002). English-Old Norse Dictionary. In Parentheses Publications.
- Hodgson, Liz (2007). The Bowder Stone A History. P3 Publications. ISBN 978-0-9547739-8-4.
- Dowden, Ken (2000). European Paganism: The Realities of Cult from Antiquity to the Middle Ages. Routledge. ISBN 0-415-12034-9.
- Page, R. I. (2002). Chronicles of the Vikings - Records, Memorials and Myths. British Museum Press. ISBN 0-7141-2800-7.
- Williams, Thomas (2017). Viking Britain - A History. William Collins Books. ISBN 978-0-00-817195-7.
