= Lune Forest =

Site of Special Scientific Interest in Teesdale, Durham, England

- Location within County Durham
- Location: MAGiC MaP
- Nearest town: Barnard Castle
- Coordinates: 54°35′N 2°14′W
- Area: 6,333.44 ha (24.4535 sq mi)
- Established: 1998
- Governing body: Natural England
- Website: Lune Forest SSSI

Lune Forest is a Site of Special Scientific Interest covering an extensive area of moorland in the Teesdale district of west Durham, England. In the north, where it adjoins the Upper Teesdale and Appleby Fells SSSIs, it extends from Mickle Fell eastward almost as far as Harter Fell, above the hamlet of Thringarth. Its southern limit is marked by the River Balder, upstream from Balderhead Reservoir, where it shares a boundary with Cotherstone Moor SSSI to the south. Grains o' th' Beck Meadows and Close House Mine SSSIs are entirely surrounded by Lune Forest, but do not form part of it.

The area has one of the most extensive areas of relatively undisturbed blanket bog in northern England, as well as a number of upland habitats, including wet and dry heath, acid grassland, limestone grassland and flushes.

The predominant vegetation is blanket mire, in which heather, Calluna vulgaris, and hare's-tail cottongrass, Eriophorum vaginatum, are co-dominant. On higher ground, to the west, dwarf shrubs such as cloudberry, Rubus chamaemorus, and crowberry, Empetrum nigrum, are more frequent. Where steep slopes have inhibited peat formation, the blanket mire gives way to dry heath, in which heather, wavy hair-grass, Deschampsia flexuosa, and bilberry, Vaccinium myrtillus, are the dominant species.

In the northern part of the site, areas where the underlying limestone outcrops at the surface, or has been cut into by small streams, are marked by bands of grassland, typically dominated by mat-grass, Nardus stricta, and with herbs such as heath bedstraw, Galium saxatile, and tormentil, Potentilla erecta. Where the limestone soils are thinner, a more species-rich grassland is found: wild thyme, Thymus praecox, and selfheal, Prunella vulgaris, are common, and in some places there are large populations of spring gentian, Gentiana verna, a nationally rare species that is found nowhere else in Great Britain outside the Teesdale area.

The area supports breeding populations of several important birds: merlin, short-eared owl and Eurasian golden plover are listed in Annex 1 of the European Commission's Birds Directive as requiring special protection, while black grouse, red grouse, dunlin, Northern lapwing, ring ouzel and twite are listed in the United Kingdom's Red Data Book (Birds).

The site is within the North Pennines Area of Outstanding Natural Beauty.

A small part of the land within the area designated as Lune Forest SSSI is owned by the Ministry of Defence (the northwest section below Mickle Fell lies within Warcop Training Area).
