= Hury Reservoir =

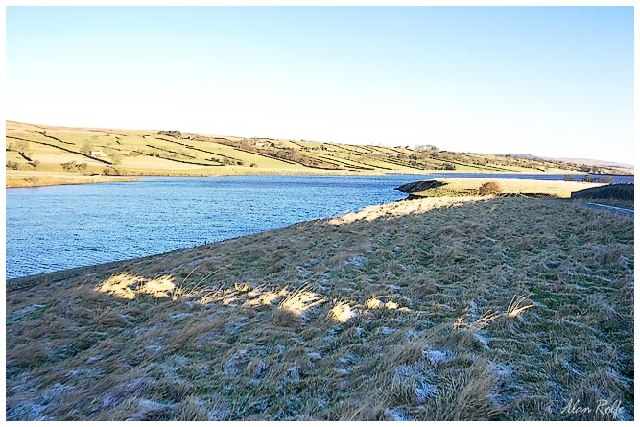

- Location within County Durham
- Location: County Durham, England
- Coordinates: 54°34′10″N 2°3′40″W
- Type: reservoir
- Basin countries: United Kingdom

Hury Reservoir is a reservoir in County Durham, England situated in Baldersdale. The reservoir is located about four miles south of Middleton-in-Teesdale and about three miles west of Cotherstone. It supplies water for Teesdale and is owned by Northumbrian Water. It gets its name from the nearby village of Hury. It is almost adjoined to Blackton Reservoir to the immediate west. The dam 'bridges' the River Balder which flows in an easterly direction to meet the River Tees at Cotherstone. Hury Reservoir was under construction in 1891–92.

== See also ==
- List of reservoirs and dams in the United Kingdom
