= Mickleton =

Mickleton could refer to:

Places in England

- Mickleton, County Durham, in Teesdale (historically in the North Riding of Yorkshire)
- Mickleton, Gloucestershire

Places in the USA

- Mickleton, New Jersey
