= Cotherstone railway station =

Former railway station in County Durham, England

Coordinates: 54.5671°N 1.9823°W

Cotherstone
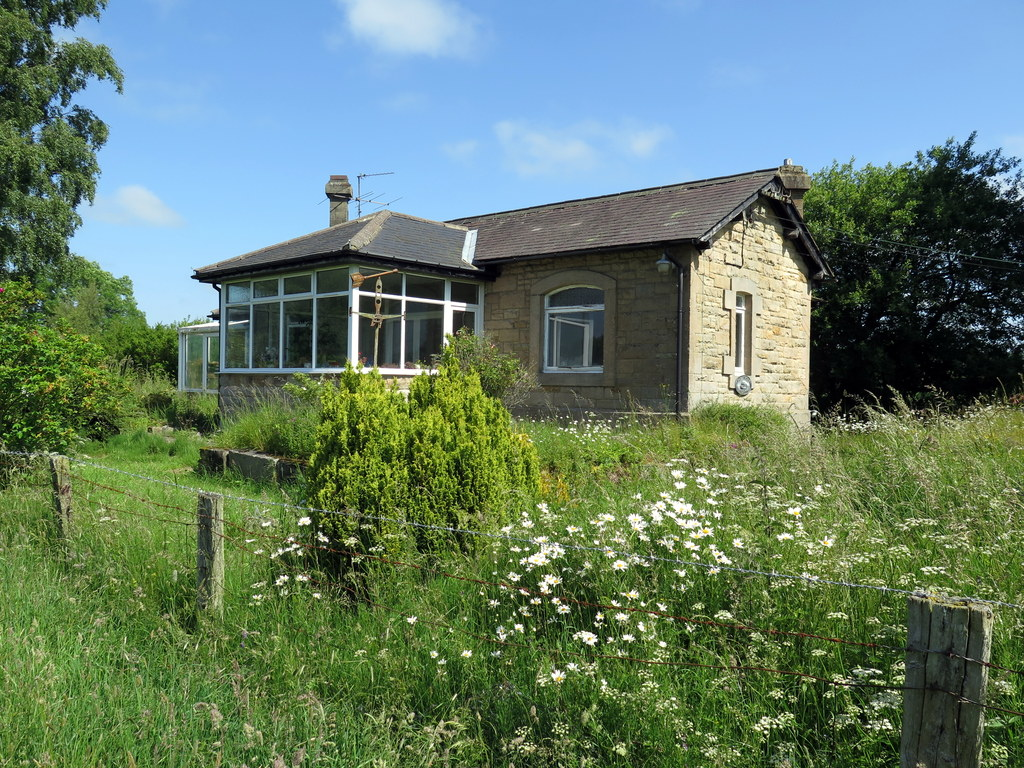

General information
- Location: Cotherstone; England

Other information
- Status: Disused

Key dates
- 13 May 1868: Opened
- 30 November 1964: Closed
Location

Cotherstone railway station was situated on the Tees Valley Railway between Barnard Castle and Middleton-in-Teesdale. It served the village of Cotherstone. The station opened to passenger traffic on 13 May 1868, and closed on 30 November 1964.

The station buildings remain intact as a private dwelling.

Preceding station	Disused railways	Following station
Barnard Castle	Tees Valley Railway	Romaldkirk
