= Mickleton railway station =

Former railway station in County Durham, England

Coordinates: 54.6053°N 2.0503°W

Mickleton railway station was situated on the Tees Valley Railway between Barnard Castle and Middleton-in-Teesdale. It served the village of Mickleton. The station opened to passenger traffic on 13 May 1868, and closed on 30 November 1964. The site, to the south of the village, now serves as a car parking area for walkers using the Tees Valley Railway walk.

Preceding station	Disused railways	Following station
Romaldkirk	Tees Valley Railway	Middleton-in-Teesdale
