= Romaldkirk railway station =

Former railway station in County Durham, England

Coordinates: 54.59335°N 2.01357°W

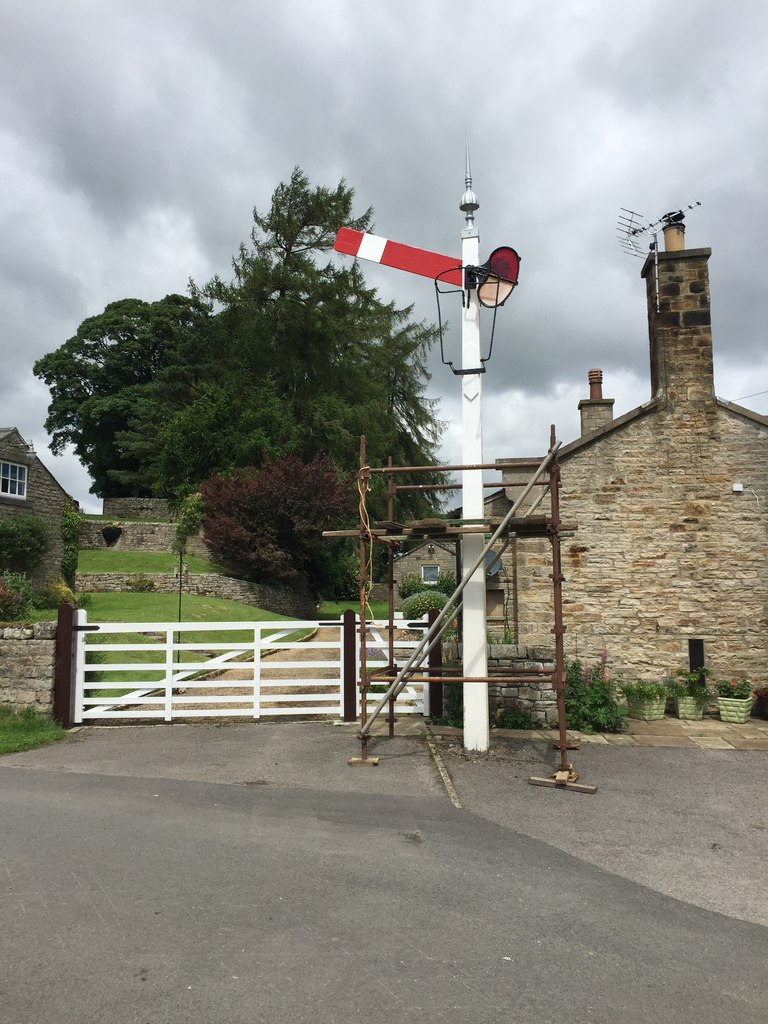
signal

Romaldkirk railway station was situated on the Tees Valley Railway between Barnard Castle and Middleton-in-Teesdale. It served the village of Romaldkirk.

The line opened to passenger traffic on 13 May 1868, but Romaldkirk station had not been completed by then. Construction was reported as being nearly completed in mid June 1869

The station was host to a LNER camping coach from 1936 to 1939 and possibly one for some of 1934.

The line and station closed to passengers on 30 November 1964 and completely on 5 April 1965.

Preceding station	Disused railways	Following station
Cotherstone	Tees Valley Railway	Mickleton
