= Baldersdale =

Valley in the Pennines, England

Coordinates: 54°34′N 2°05′W

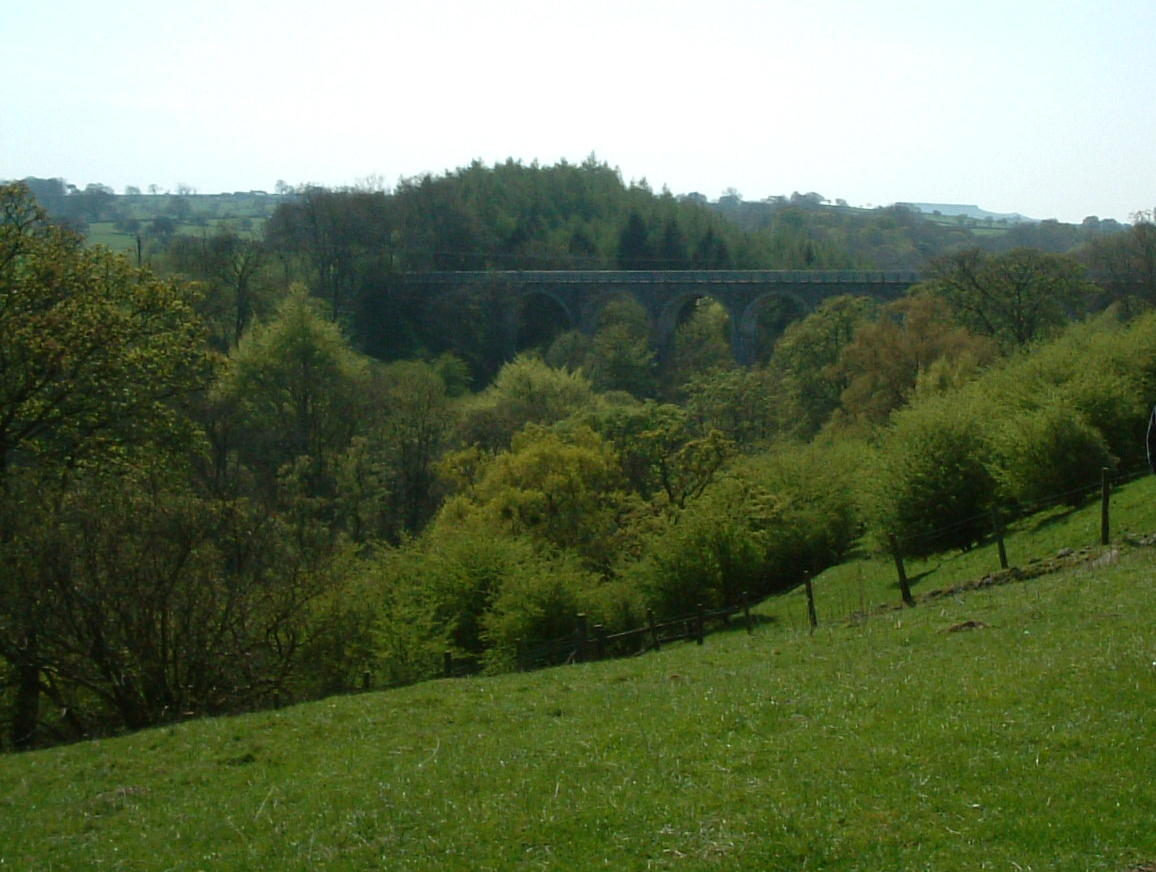
The Balder Railway Viaduct near Cotherstone

Baldersdale is a dale, or valley, on the east side of the Pennines in England, northwest of Barnard Castle. Its principal settlements are Hury and Briscoe. Baldersdale lies within the traditional boundaries of the North Riding of Yorkshire. Under provisions of the Local Government Act 1972, it was incorporated into County Durham for administrative purposes on 1 April 1974, along with the rest of the former Startforth Rural District.

The River Balder flows through Baldersdale before reaching Cotherstone where it joins the River Tees. The river flows through three reservoirs on the way: Balderhead Reservoir, Blackton Reservoir and Hury Reservoir. Running roughly parallel to Baldersdale to the north is Lunedale. A former railway viaduct from the now-closed Barnard Castle to Middleton-in-Teesdale line crosses the River Balder just west of Cotherstone.

Baldersdale Youth Hostel, run by the Youth Hostels Association, was a popular overnight stop on the Pennine Way which passes through the valley, but it has now closed. The building has reopened as Blackton Lodge. There are various self-catering holiday cottages situated in the dale, including West Hury and East Briscoe.

Hannah Hauxwell, who became well known after an ITV documentary about her life in 1972 (Too Long A Winter), worked an inherited farm on her own in Baldersdale under very frugal conditions at Low Birk Hatt. Part of her farm is now a nature reserve, known as Hannah's Meadows.

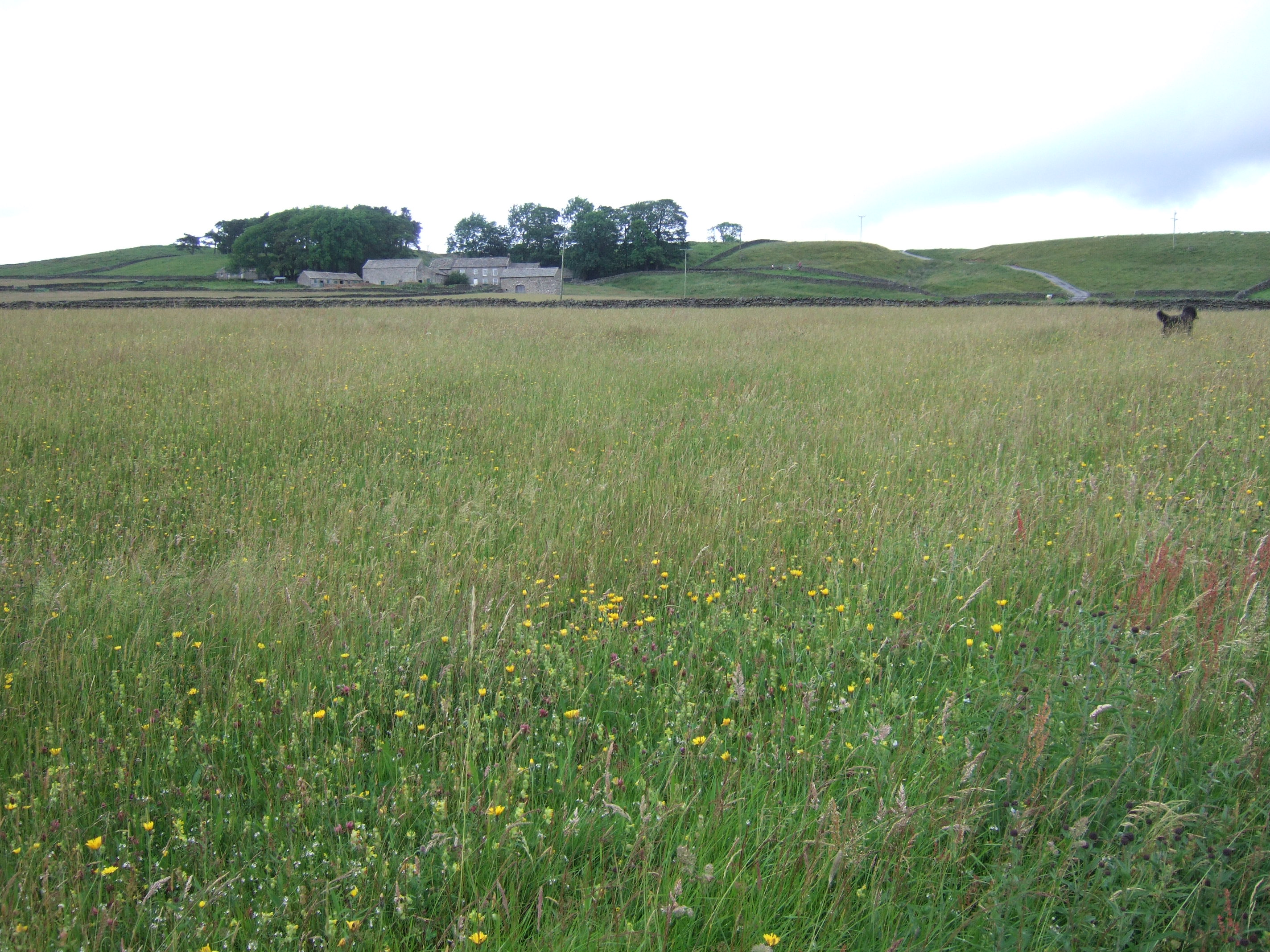
Hannah's meadow, Baldersdale with High Birk Hatt farm in distance.
