= Bowes railway station =

Disused railway station in County Durham, England

Coordinates: 54.5197°N 2.0076°W

Bowes
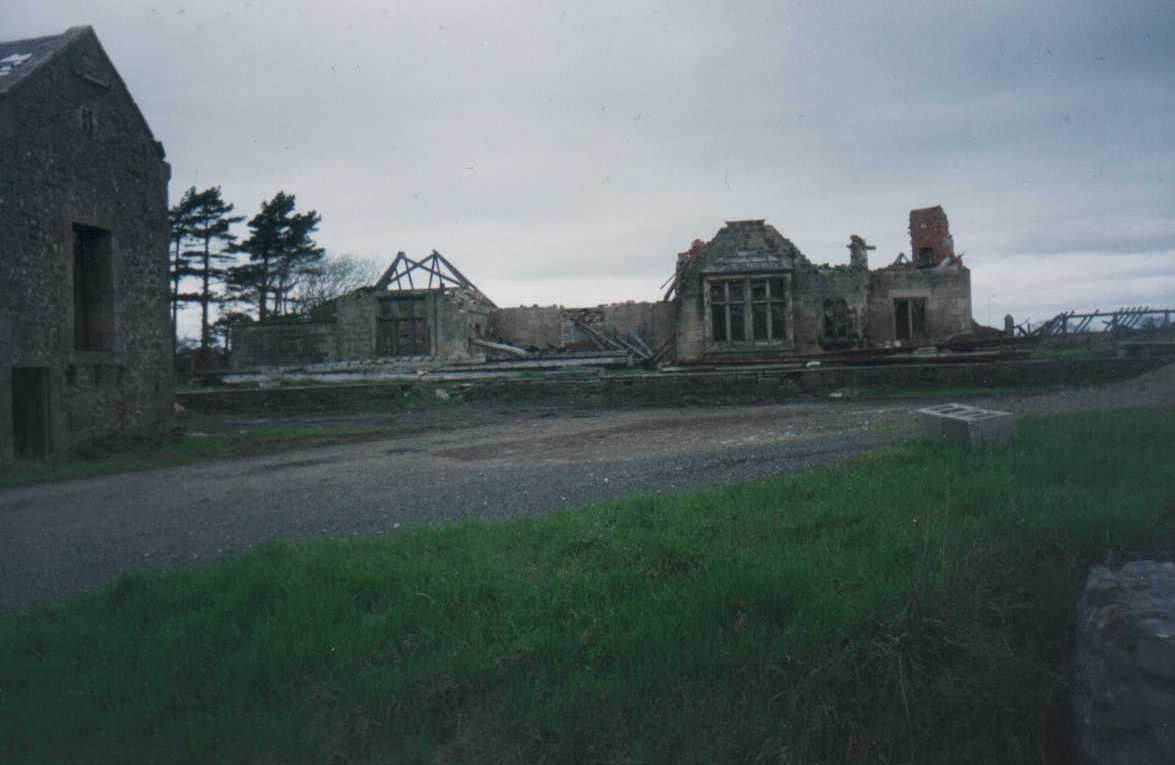
- The remains of Bowes railway station in 1996.

General information
- Location: Bowes, County Durham; England
- Platforms: 2

Other information
- Status: Disused

History
- Original company: SD&LUR
- Pre-grouping: North Eastern Railway

Key dates
- 8 August 1861: Opened
- 22 January 1962: Closed
Location

Bowes railway station was situated on the South Durham & Lancashire Union Railway between Barnard Castle and Kirkby Stephen East.

== History ==
The line was opened on 26 March 1861 when a mineral train was run, the line opened to passengers on 8 August 1861 following an opening ceremony the day before.

The station served the village of Bowes. The station was host to a camping coach in 1933 and from 1937 to 1939 and possibly also in 1934.

The station was closed by British Railways North Eastern Region on 22 January 1962.

== The site today ==
The station buildings are now (2023) in an extreme state of dereliction. A large farm shed covers a portion of the platforms and yard.

The signal box, which for many years after closure was hidden away inside the farm shed, was dismantled and is in storage.

The trackbed westwards of the station (towards Stainmore Summit) is covered by the re-aligned A66 road.

The station is due to be demolished as part of the dualling of the A66.

== Images ==
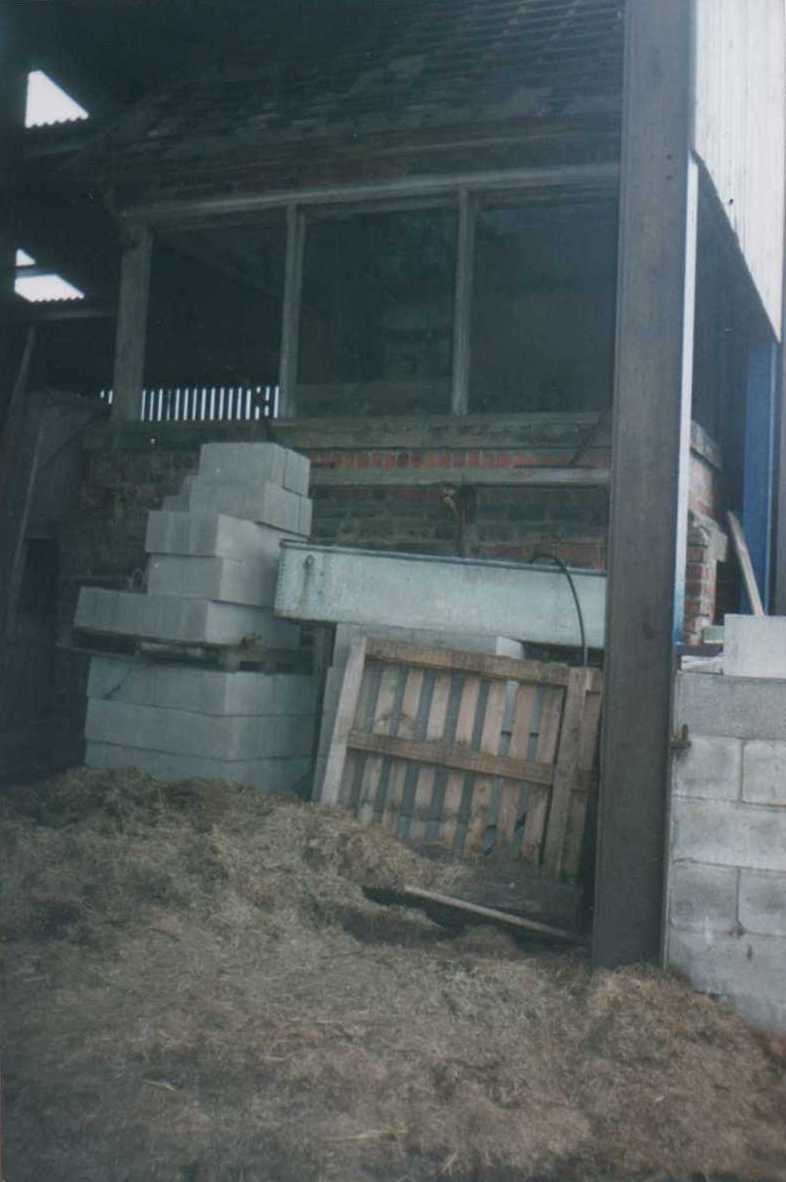
Bowes signal box in 1996

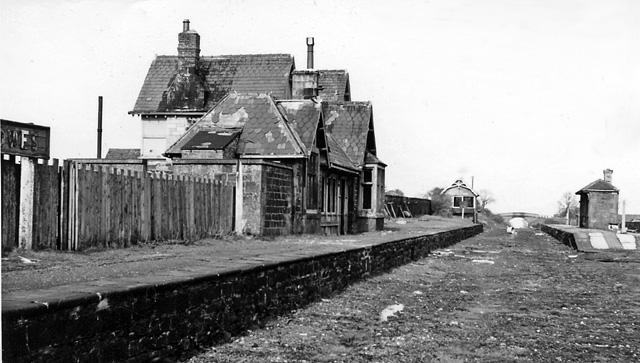
The station in 1965

| Preceding station | Disused railways | Following station |
|---|---|---|
| Barras | South Durham & Lancashire Union Railway | Lartington |

== Bibliography ==
- McRae, Andrew (1997). British Railway Camping Coach Holidays: The 1930s & British Railways (London Midland Region). Vol. Scenes from the Past: 30 (Part One). Foxline. ISBN 1-870119-48-7.
- Quick, Michael (2022) [2001]. Railway passenger stations in Great Britain: a chronology (PDF). version 5.04. Railway & Canal Historical Society. Archived from the original (PDF) on 25 November 2022.
