= Hunderthwaite =

Village and civil parish in England

Coordinates: 54.585°N 2.022°W

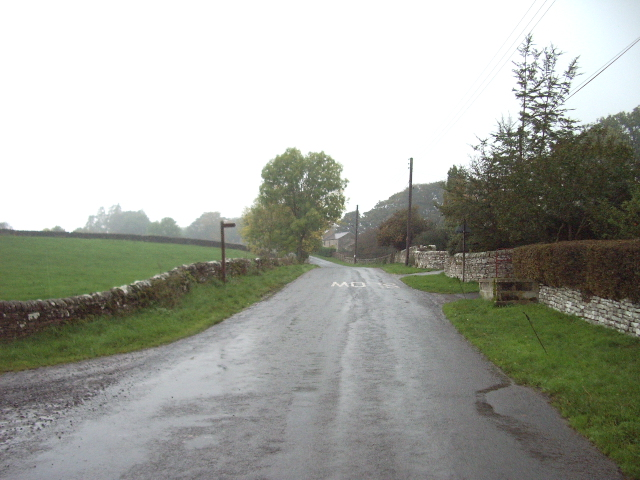
Hunderthwaite

Hunderthwaite is a village and civil parish in Teesdale, in the Pennines of England. The population of the civil parish taken at the 2011 census was 114. It was historically located in the North Riding of Yorkshire but along with the rest of the former Startforth Rural District it was transferred to County Durham for administrative and ceremonial purposes on 1 April 1974, under the provisions of the Local Government Act 1972. Etymologically speaking, Hunderthwaite is derived most plausibly from Old Norse Hunrothr-þveit, meaning 'Hunrothr's clearing'. The first element in the name could also be Old English hundred, a type of administrative division.
