= Evenwood railway station =

Disused railway station in Evenwood, County Durham

Evenwood
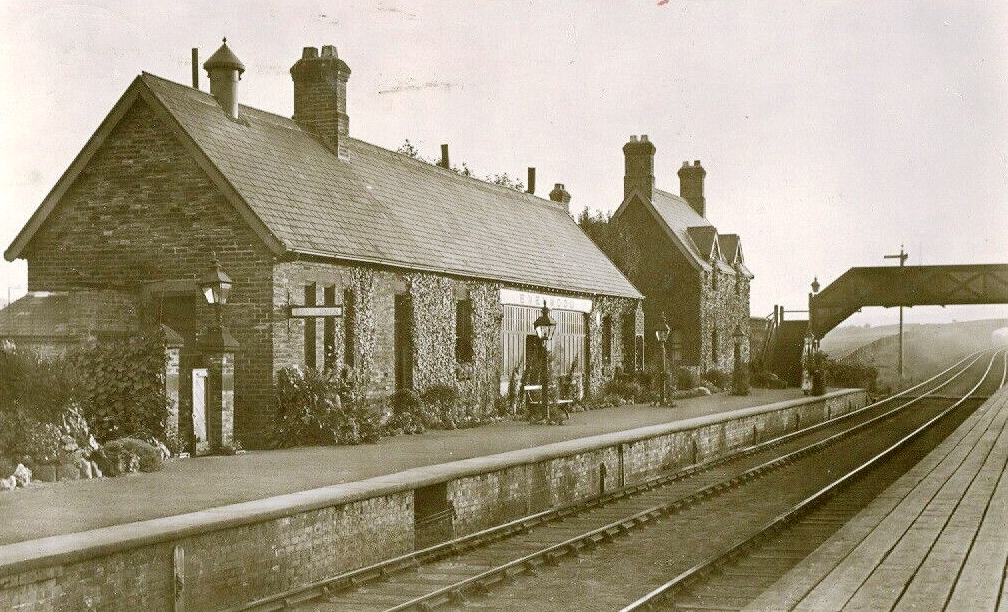

General information
- Location: Evenwood, County Durham; England
- Coordinates: 54.6298°N 1.7707°W
- Grid reference: NZ149261
- Platforms: 2

Other information
- Status: Disused

History
- Original company: North Eastern Railway
- Pre-grouping: North Eastern Railway
- Post-grouping: LNER; British Railways (North Eastern)

Key dates
- 13 October 1858: First station opened
- May 1864: Closed and relocated
- 14 October 1957: Second station closed to passengers
- 18 June 1962: Second station closed to goods traffic
Location

Evenwood railway station served the village of Evenwood, County Durham, England from 1858 to 1962 on the South Durham and Lancashire Union Railway.

== History ==
The station opened on 13 October 1858 by the North Eastern Railway. It was originally on the Hagger Leases branch but it was relocated in May 1864. It closed to passengers on 14 October 1957 and closed to goods traffic on 18 June 1962.

Preceding station	Disused railways	Following station
West Auckland; Line and station closed	North Eastern Railway; South Durham and Lancashire Union Railway	Cockfield Fell; Line and station closed
