= Cockfield Fell railway station =

Disused railway station in Cockfield, County Durham

Cockfield Fell
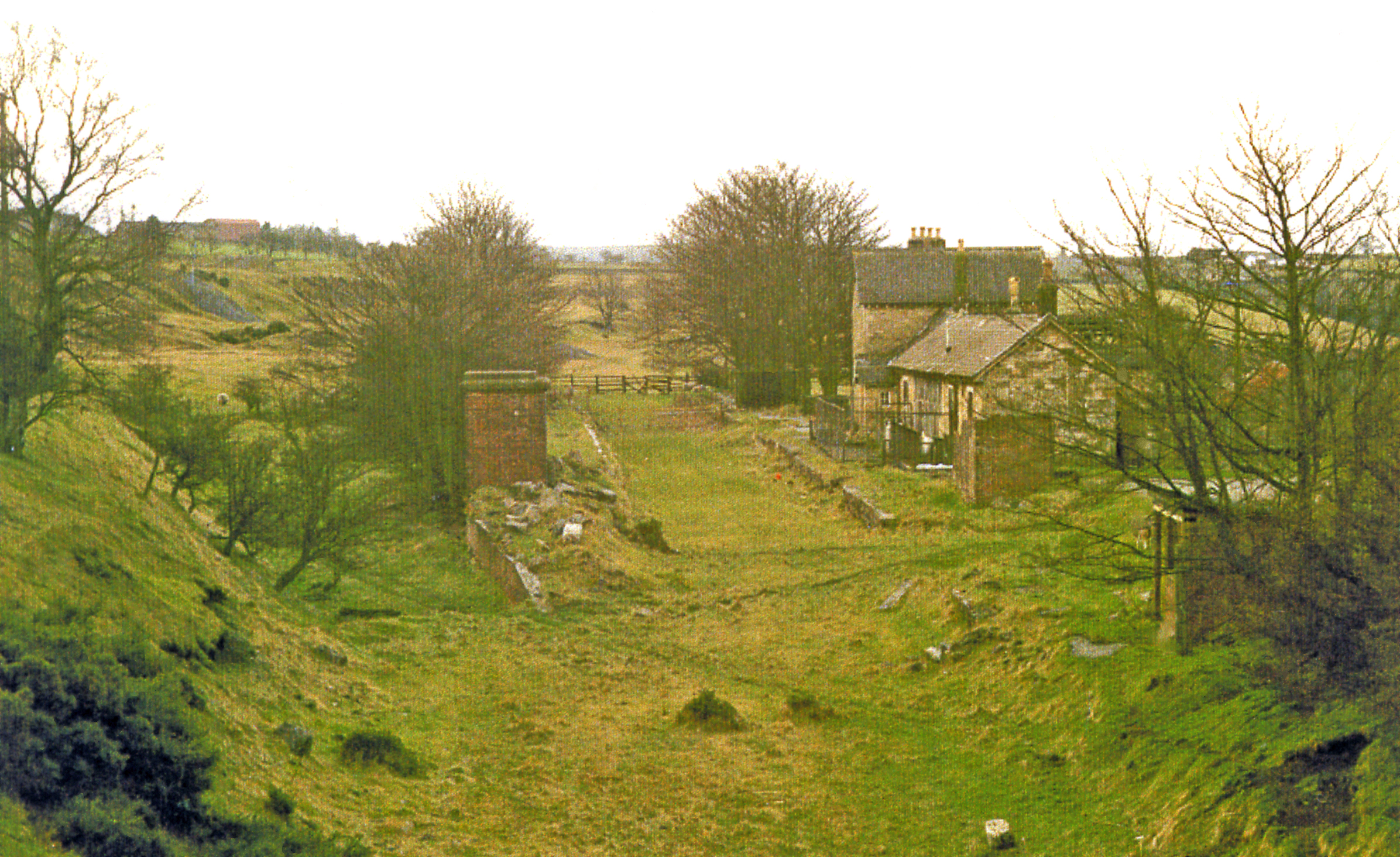
- The site of the station in 1989

General information
- Location: Cockfield, County Durham; England
- Coordinates: 54.6173°N 1.8281°W
- Grid reference: NZ112247
- Platforms: 2

Other information
- Status: Disused

History
- Original company: North Eastern Railway
- Pre-grouping: North Eastern Railway
- Post-grouping: LNER; British Railways (North Eastern)

Key dates
- 1 August 1863: Opened as Cockfield
- 1 July 1923: Renamed Cockfield Fell
- 15 September 1958: Closed to passengers
- 18 June 1962: Closed completely
Location

Cockfield Fell railway station was a railway station on the Bishop Auckland to Barnard Castle section of the South Durham and Lancashire Union Railway that served the village of Cockfield, County Durham, North East England from 1863 to 1962.

== History ==
The station was opened as Cockfield on 1 August 1863 by the North Eastern Railway on the route the SD&LUR, one of its predecessors. The suffix Fell was later added to the station's name on 1 July 1923 to avoid confusion with another London and North Eastern Railway station in Suffolk of the same name. It closed to passengers on 15 September 1958 and to goods traffic on 18 June 1962.

Preceding station	Disused railways	Following station
Barnard Castle; Line and station closed	North Eastern Railway; South Durham and Lancashire Union Railway	Evenwood; Line and station closed
