= Gilmonby =

Coordinates: 54.51176°N 1.9915°W

- Location within County Durham
- OS grid reference: NZ006129
- Unitary authority: County Durham
- Ceremonial county: County Durham
- Region: North East
- Country: England
- Sovereign state: United Kingdom
- Post town: Barnard Castle
- Postcode district: DL12
- Police: Durham
- Fire: County Durham and Darlington
- Ambulance: North East
- UK Parliament: Bishop Auckland

Gilmonby is a village in the Pennines in County Durham, England. it is situated a short distance to the south of Bowes, in the vicinity of Barnard Castle. The population taken at the 2011 Census was less than 100. Information is kept in the Bowes parish details. It is traditionally located in the North Riding of Yorkshire but along with the rest of the former Startforth Rural District it was transferred to County Durham for administrative and ceremonial purposes on 1 April 1974, under the provisions of the Local Government Act 1972.
