= Barry Cockcroft =

British director, writer and producer (1932-2001)

Barry Cockcroft (4 October 1932 – 4 February 2001) was a British television documentary director, writer and producer. He is best known for his documentary Too Long A Winter about the lady, Hannah Hauxwell who lived alone on a remote farm in the Pennines.

Cockcroft was born in Rochdale, Lancashire. After leaving school he started work as a proof-reader on the Rochdale Observer and he soon became a reporter and a feature writer. A researcher at Yorkshire Television at its inception in 1968, he was making short films about people who lived in the Yorkshire Dales when he discovered Hauxwell. He went on to write best selling books about her and took her around Europe and to North America for further documentaries.

Another memorable documentary made by Cockcroft was A Romany Summer, featuring a family of Romani Gypsies travelling and living around York, dealing in horses and attending the Appleby Horse Fair. He additionally directed The Underground Eiger, which detailed the record-setting cave dive of Oliver Statham and Geoff Yeadon.

He married Sheila Jackson in 1956 and they had two daughters, Julie Chadwick and Sarah Manley. After Sheila's death he moved to Cornwall and married Celia Hodgins in 1978; they had a daughter, Lucy Cockcroft.

Cockcroft died of Lou Gehrig's disease (ALS) in St Ives, Cornwall on 4 February 2001 at the age of 68.
