= Boldron =

Coordinates: 54.52435°N 1.94821°W

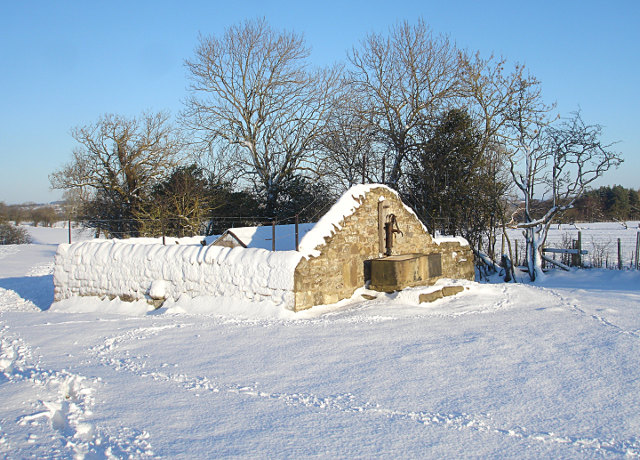
- Boldron village well

- Location within County Durham
- Population: 109 (2011)
- OS grid reference: NZ034143
- Unitary authority: County Durham
- Ceremonial county: County Durham
- Region: North East
- Country: England
- Sovereign state: United Kingdom
- Post town: Barnard Castle
- Postcode district: DL12
- Police: Durham
- Fire: County Durham and Darlington
- Ambulance: North East
- UK Parliament: Bishop Auckland

Boldron is a village in the Pennines of England, situated close to Barnard Castle. It was historically located in the North Riding of Yorkshire, but along with the rest of the former Startforth Rural District it was transferred to County Durham for administrative and ceremonial purposes on 1 April 1974, under the provisions of the Local Government Act 1972.

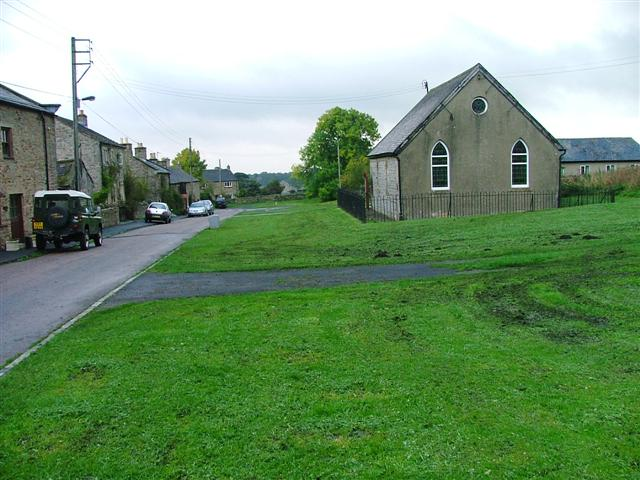
The Methodist Church at Boldron, now converted into a community run pub, called the Pinfold club
