= The Underground Eiger =

- Directed by: Barry Cockcroft
- Produced by: John Fairley
- Cinematography: Mostafa Hammuri
- Edited by: Terry Warwick
- Production company: Yorkshire Television
- Release date: 21 February 1979
- Running time: 50 minutes
- Country: United Kingdom
- Language: English

The Underground Eiger is a made-for-television documentary that was released in 1979. It details a world-record-breaking cave dive of 6,000 ft (1,800 m) made by Geoff Yeadon and Oliver Statham from West Kingsdale Master Cave, in North Yorkshire, England to Keld Head. An estimated 20 million viewers watched its television debut. It has been called "legendary in caving folklore", and notable cave diver Rick Stanton cites it as the impetus that sparked his interest in cave diving.

== Background ==
Geoff Yeadon and Oliver "Bear" Statham began to systematically explore Keld Head in 1975. Derek Crossland found the body of Alan Erith on 4 July 1975. His body was recovered by Crossland, Yeadon, and Statham the following day. Over the years the two divers, in addition to others, explored both the Keld Head and West Kingsdale Master Cave systems. Exploration was complicated by constricted passageways, low visibility due to silt, and shortage of airbells (pockets of air) in which to swap out air cylinders. By 1976, the unexplored distance between the two systems was only 275 m (902 ft). In 1978, they dived with Jochen Hasenmayer into the system, where disaster was narrowly averted. Hasenmayer became temporarily trapped in a narrow passage, and Yeadon attempted to help him escape it at great personal risk. At one point, Hasenmayer thrust his hand out to the other side of the passage and grasped Yeadon's hand; Yeadon was able to untangle the line that had trapped him and Hasenmayer was freed. Yeadon later recounted, "I thought I was shaking a dead man's hand in there"; the narrow passageway would then be referred to as "Dead Man's Handshake".

By June 1978, the unexplored section between the two systems was reduced to 60 m (200 ft). In July, the connection was officially made by Yeadon, Statham, and Hasenmayer traveling from Keld Head until they reached the Kingsdale line. After making the connection, they turned around and went back to Keld Head. Their next goal would be to traverse the entire 1,829 m (6,001 ft) distance between Keld Head and the West Kingsdale Master Cave.

== Summary ==
The film details Yeadon and Statham's preparation for traversing "the Underground Eiger", so named after the mountain Eiger, as well as the venture itself. In part one, Yeadon and Statham are shown pouring red dye into the Kingdale river, a tributary of the River Lune, at the part where it goes underground. Three days later and 1 mi (1.6 km) away, the dye resurfaces at Keld Head. The two dive into Keld Head and bank emergency supplies of air cylinders underwater for their future dive.

Part two begins with the Yeadon and Statham awakening on the day of the dive, January 16, 1979, in the hostel where they were staying. Once the dive begins, they are able to maintain contact with the crew on the surface thanks to the use of a new radio technology dubbed the "Molefone"—a type of speleophone that enabled communication via magnetic induction. At Dead Man's Handshake, Statham encounters serious trouble when a piece of rock jams his demand valve, though he is able to clear the obstacle and maintain his air supply. After clearing Dead Man's Handshake, the pair are in good spirits and Statham's singing of "Show Me the Way to Go Home" is picked up on the radios as they near completion of the dive. The film ends with the two successfully emerging at Keld Head.

== Filming ==
Filming for the documentary was complicated by the fact that only a few camera operators hired for the project had experience filming in caves. Additionally, cavers hired for the project were under the impression that their only duties would be to haul diving and filming equipment in and out of the caves; they were surprised to learn that they would also be filmed. Simon Garvey and Stuart Herbage, two of the cavers, recalled that their only "acting lessons" consisted of two pieces of advice from Barry Cockcroft: "act naturally" and "don't look at the camera".

Filming was also complicated by technical issues. One roll of film was ruined when it was exposed to light before it was developed, necessitating some scenes being reshot. At one point, cinematographer Mostafa Hammuri fell into the water while filming a scene, though he was able to rescue himself.

Video and audio of the record-breaking dive was provided by the divers themselves. Statham was equipped with two lightweight, waterproof cameras, while Yeadon was charged with maintaining radio contact with the surface via the speleophone.

== Legacy ==
The film was nationally televised in the United Kingdom with 20 million viewers watching its debut. It remains "legendary in caving folklore". Statham and Yeadon's dive was a world record at the time, and remained a United Kingdom record until it was broken in 1991. The film has emotional significance as well, as Statham committed suicide on September 28, 1979 at the age of 27. Cave diver and rescue specialist Rick Stanton states that viewing the film as a teenager inspired his interest in cave diving.
