= Hannah Hauxwell =

English farmer (1926–2018)

- Born: 1 August 1926; Sleetburn, Baldersdale, North Riding of Yorkshire, England
- Died: 30 January 2018 (aged 91); West Auckland, County Durham, England
- Occupation: Farmer
- Known for: Documentary subject

Hannah Bayles Tallentire Hauxwell (1 August 1926 – 30 January 2018) was an English farmer who was the subject of several television documentaries. She first came to public attention after being covered in an ITV documentary, Too Long a Winter, made by Yorkshire Television and produced by Barry Cockcroft, which chronicled the almost unendurable conditions of farmers in the High Pennines in winter.

== Yorkshire Post article ==
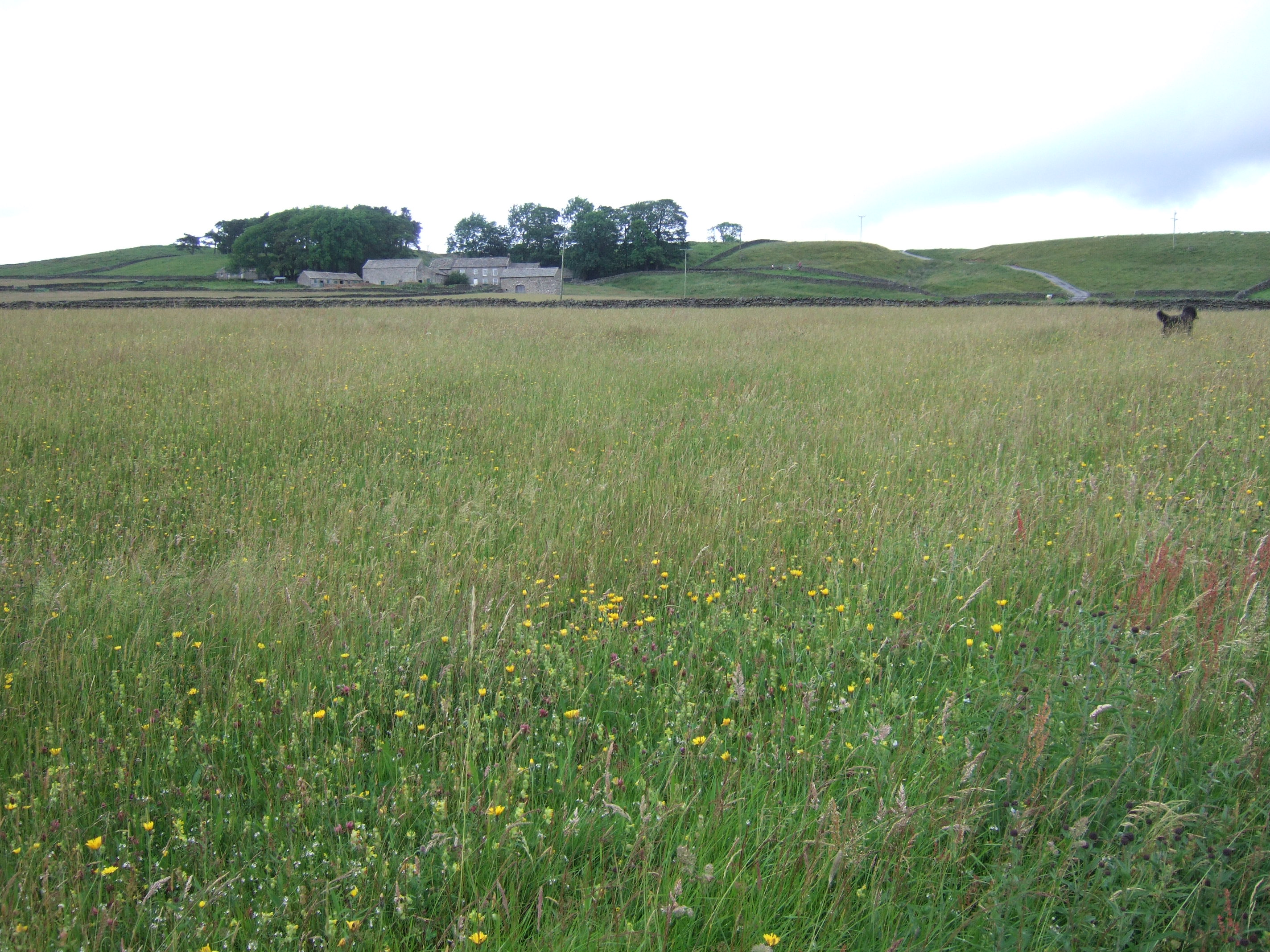
Hannah's Meadow in Baldersdale, with High Birk Hatt Farm in the background

A Yorkshire Post article published in April 1970 chronicled the daily life of Hauxwell, then 44, as she worked alone in her family home, Low Birk Hatt Farm, a dilapidated 80-acre (32 ha) farm in Baldersdale, west of Cotherstone, in the North Riding of Yorkshire (transferred for administrative purposes in 1974 to County Durham). She had run the farm by herself since the age of 35 following the deaths of her parents and uncle. With no electricity or running water and struggling to survive on £240–280 a year (equivalent to £2,700 in 2018) – at the time, the average annual salary in the UK was £1,339 (equivalent to £14,100 in 2018). Life was a constant battle against poverty and hardship, especially in the harsh Pennine winters, when she had to work outside tending her few cattle in ragged clothes in temperatures well below freezing.

== Television documentaries ==
=== Too Long a Winter ===
In the summer of 1972, Hauxwell was discovered by a friend of a researcher at Yorkshire Television while out walking in the Yorkshire Dales. The researcher contacted Barry Cockcroft, a producer at the company, who proposed to make a TV documentary tentatively entitled The Hard Life. The documentary started with her leading a cow into a shed during a blizzard in Baldersdale. After the documentary was first shown in 1972, Yorkshire TV's phone line was jammed for three days with viewers wanting to find out more and help her. ITV received hundreds of phone calls and mail containing gifts and money for "the old lady in the Yorkshire Dales". A local factory raised money to fund getting electricity to Low Birk Hatt Farm, and she continued to receive thousands of letters and donations from well-wishers around the world.

=== A Winter Too Many ===
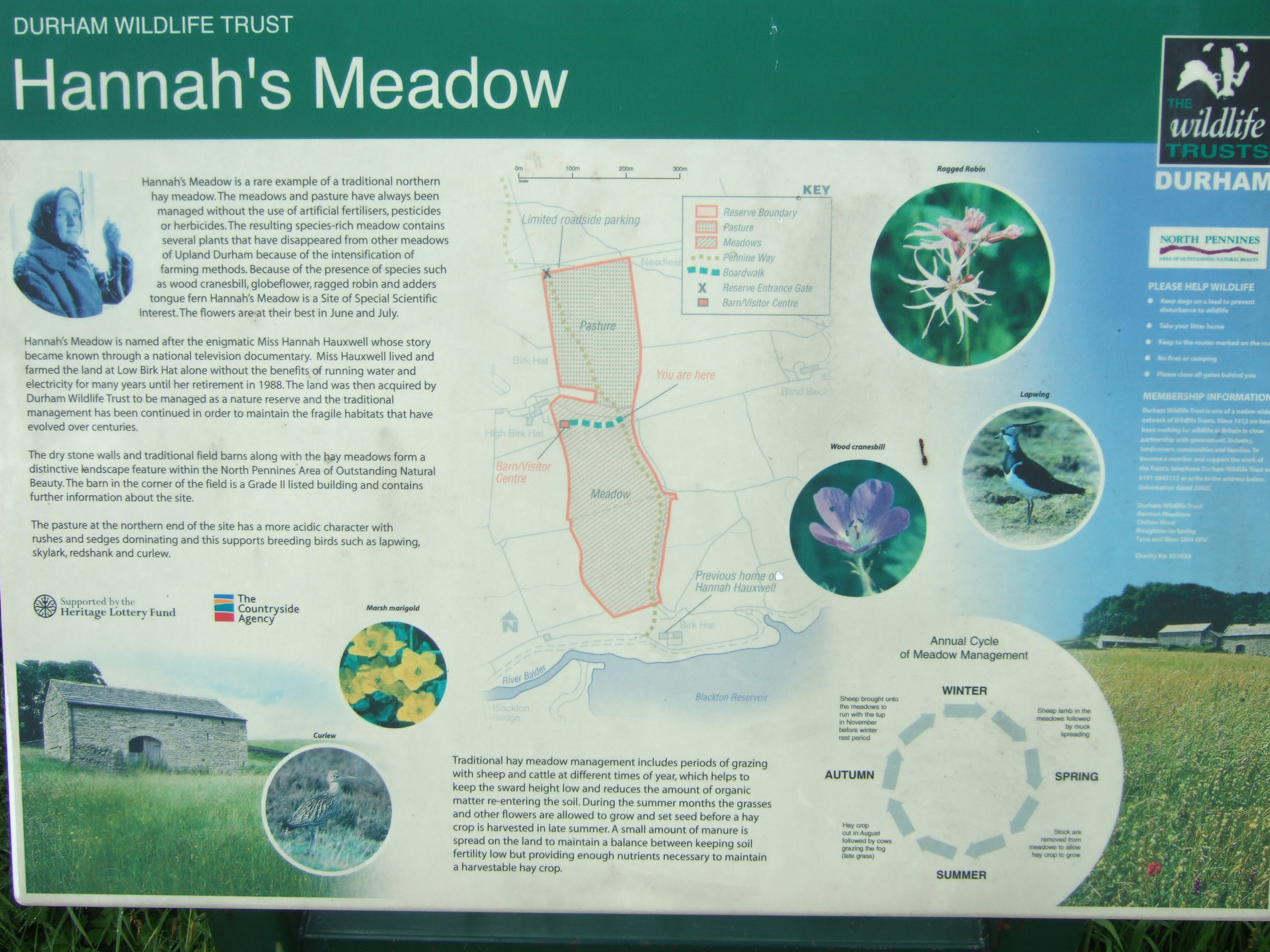
Board describing aspects of Hannah Hauxwell's old farm

Almost two decades after Too Long a Winter, the same TV crew returned to her farm to catch up with Hauxwell. The second documentary, A Winter Too Many, saw that Hauxwell had a little more money, which she had invested in a few more cows. The crew followed her to London where she was guest of honour at the Women of the Year gala. Out of the spotlight, however, her work on the farm continued, and each winter became harder for her to endure. She commented "In summer I live and in winter I exist" in the film, which also showed her departure just before Christmas 1988. With her health and strength slowly failing, she had to sell her family farm and the animals she adored and move into a warm cottage in a nearby village.

=== Hannah Goes To Town ===
The footage of Hauxwell's journey to the Women of the Year gala at the London Savoy Hotel as a guest of honour, where she met the Duchess of Gloucester – which was briefly touched upon in A Winter Too Many – was used alongside additional footage (collected at the time) to document Hauxwell's entire trip.

=== Hannah Hauxwell: Innocent Abroad ===
In 1992 director Barry Cockcroft once again ventured into Hauxwell's life making a documentary series which followed Hauxwell on her first trips outside of the UK. Hauxwell visited France, Germany, Austria, Switzerland and Italy, during which she met the Pope. The series proved so popular it was followed by another trip, this time to the United States in 1993, filmed as Hannah:USA.

== Later life ==
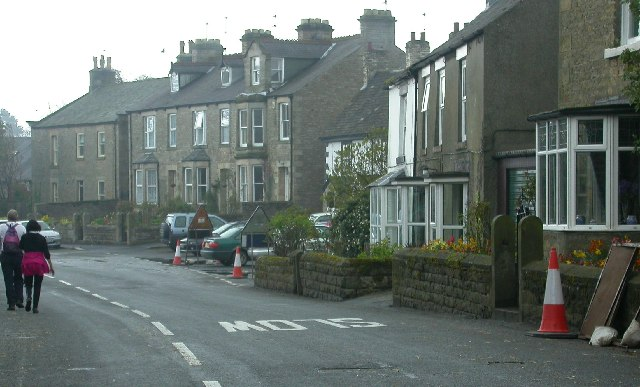
A street in Cotherstone, photographed in 2005, with Hauxwell's retirement cottage seen in the background, third from the right

After selling her land and farmhouse, Hauxwell was comfortably off and moved into a small cottage in the village of Cotherstone, less than five miles (8 km) from Low Birk Hatt Farm, where the meadows, designated a Site of Special Scientific Interest, are now called Hannah's Meadows and managed by Durham Wildlife Trust. A book, Hannah Hauxwell—80 Years in the Dales (W. R. Mitchell) was published in 2008. A new DVD, Hannah Hauxwell—An Extraordinary Life, featuring Too Long A Winter, A Winter Too Many, and Innocent Abroad, was published. Hauxwell was interviewed on Woman's Hour in March 2008. To mark her 85th year, she was interviewed by the Yorkshire Post and revealed that she was still living a frugal life and remained an avid radio listener.

In 2016, Hauxwell moved into a care home in Barnard Castle, and the following year into a nursing home in West Auckland. She died there on 30 January 2018, aged 91. After a funeral service at Barnard Castle Methodist Church, Hauxwell was laid to rest at Romaldkirk cemetery, not far from Low Birk Hatt.
