= Lartington railway station =

Disused railway station in County Durham, England

Coordinates: 54.5553°N 1.9748°W

Lartington
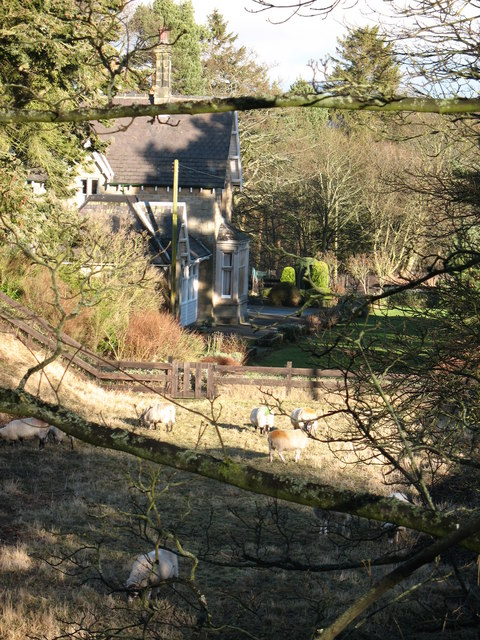
- The former station in 2008

General information
- Location: Lartington, County Durham; England
- Platforms: 2

Other information
- Status: Disused

History
- Original company: South Durham and Lancashire Union Railway
- Pre-grouping: North Eastern Railway
- Post-grouping: London and North Eastern Railway

Key dates
- 1861: Opened
- 1962: Closed
Location

Lartington railway station was situated on the South Durham & Lancashire Union Railway between Barnard Castle and Kirkby Stephen East. It served the village of Lartington. The station opened to passenger traffic on 26 March 1861, and closed on 22 January 1962. The station and related buildings remain intact as a private dwelling.

In 1910, Lartington station was the site of an accident in which 7 people were injured.

| Preceding station | Disused railways | Following station |
|---|---|---|
| Bowes | South Durham & Lancashire Union Railway | Barnard Castle |
