= Blackton Reservoir =

Reservoir in County Durham, England

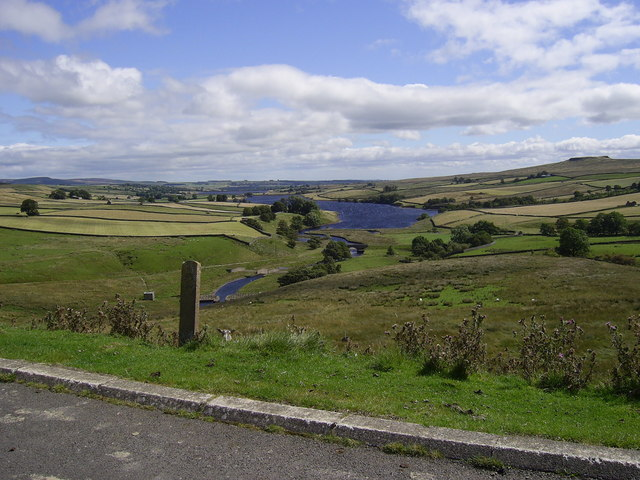

- Location within County Durham
- Location: County Durham, England
- Coordinates: 54°33′42″N 2°5′32″W
- Type: reservoir
- Basin countries: United Kingdom

Blackton Reservoir is a reservoir in County Durham, England. It is situated in Baldersdale, about 4-mile (6.4 km) west of Cotherstone, where the River Balder joins the River Tees.

It is owned by Northumbrian Water and supplies water for Teesdale. Blackton has a surface area of 25 hectares (62 acres), an average depth of 7.9 metres (26 ft), a catchment area of 3,374 hectares (8,340 acres) and it lies at 285 metres (935 ft) above sea level.

Blackton is one of a series of reservoirs on the same stretch of the Balder, located immediately downstream of the larger Balderhead Reservoir and being almost continuous with Hury Reservoir further downstream.

== See also ==
- List of reservoirs and dams in the United Kingdom
