= Tees Valley Railway =

Former branch line in Northern England

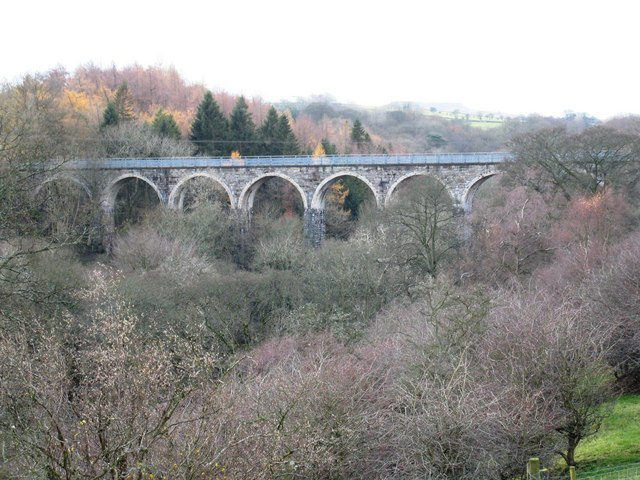
- Balder Railway Viaduct

Overview
- Stations: Five

History
- Opened: 13 May 1868
- Closed: 5 April 1965

Technical
- Line length: 8 3/4 mi (14.1 km)
- Number of tracks: 1
- Track gauge: 4 ft 8 1/2 in (1,435 mm) standard gauge

The Tees Valley Railway was an 8 3/4-mile (14.1 km) branch railway line that ran between Barnard Castle on the South Durham and Lancashire Union Railway line between Bishop Auckland and Kirkby Stephen East, and Middleton-in-Teesdale via three intermediate stations Cotherstone, Romaldkirk and Mickleton.

== History ==
Tees Valley Railway Act 1865
- Act of Parliament
- Parliament of the United Kingdom
- Long title: An Act to incorporate a Company for making a Railway from the South Durham and Lancashire Union Branch of the North-eastern Railway at Lartington to Middleton in Teesdale; Working Arrangements with the North-eastern Railway Company; Powers to that Company to subscribe; and for other Purposes.
- Citation: 28 & 29 Vict. c. xci

Dates
- Royal assent: 19 June 1865

Text of statute as originally enacted

The railway was authorised by the Tees Valley Railway Act 1865 (28 & 29 Vict. c. xci). The first sod was cut on 19 June 1865 by the Duke of Cleveland, who owned a large portion of land that the railway would cross. Whilst building the line in August 1867, the foreman of works, in a hurry to build a viaduct at Baldersdale, removed the wooden frame from underneath the viaduct being built at Mickleton before the keystone was in place. Four men were injured due to falling bricks, but there were no fatalities. Both viaducts survive, but only the grade II listed Mickleton Viaduct is used as part of the Tees Valley Walk; Baldersdale viaduct is in private hands.

The Works by this Act authorized comprise the following; (that is to say,)

- A Railway, with all necessary Stations, Bridges, Sidings, Works, and Conveniences connected therewith and Approaches thereto, commencing by a Junction with the Rails of the South Durham and Lancashire Union Branch of the North-eastern Railway in the Township of Cotherstone in the Parish of Romaldkirk in the North Riding of the County of York, and passing through the Townships of Cotherstone, Hunderthwaite, Romaldkirk, Mickleton, Lune or Lunedule, and Holwick, all in the Parish of Romaldkirk in the North Riding of the County of York, and terminating near Middleton in Teesdale on the East Side of the Middleton and Brough Turnpike Road, and on the West Side of a Field called Wood Top Field in the said Township of Holwick belonging to John Bowes, and in the Occupation of Charles Raine and John Raine.
— Section 19, Tees Valley Railway Act 1865 (28 & 29 Vict. c. xci)

=== Opening ===
Built as the southern section of a proposed a line from Barnard Castle to Alston that was never completed the section to Middleton-in-Teesdale was built by the Tees Valley Railway opening on 13 May 1868, with intermediate stations at Mickleton and Cotherstone. Romaldkirk opened later in the July of the same year.

The Tees Valley Railway was absorbed by the North Eastern Railway by the North Eastern Railway (Additional Powers) Act 1882 (45 & 46 Vict. c. l).

=== Traffic ===
The line was primarily used to transport stone from first the Middleton Quarry and later the Park End and Crossthwaite Quarries. Although Middleton Quarry closed in the 1930s the other two quarries outlasted the line. Stone was also forwarded from Greengates quarry and much of the stone from Lunedale quarry was railed out on a 2-foot-6-inch (0.76 m) tramway to exchange sidings between Mickleton and Middleton. Work started on a reservoir at Grassholme in 1914 and this provided extra traffic with the addition of transfer sidings for the construction site. The original intention of the line was to rail out lead from the adjacent hills, but by the time that the line had opened, the lead industry boom had mostly gone into reverse. However, in 1911, the station at Middleton railed out 1,985 tonnes (2,188 tons) of barytes.

A shed was provided at Middleton to service the steam trains up and down the line. Most trains worked beyond Barnard Castle and into Darlington with at least five out and back workings daily in 1922 which had risen to six each way by the 1946 timetable.

=== Closure ===
The line closed for passenger traffic on 30 November 1964 and the line closed to freight on 5 April 1965.

== The site today ==
Much of the line now forms the Tees Valley Railway Walk, with parking provided at the former site of Mickleton station.
