= Lunedale =

Valley and civil parish in County Durham, England

Coordinates: 54.600°N 2.209°W

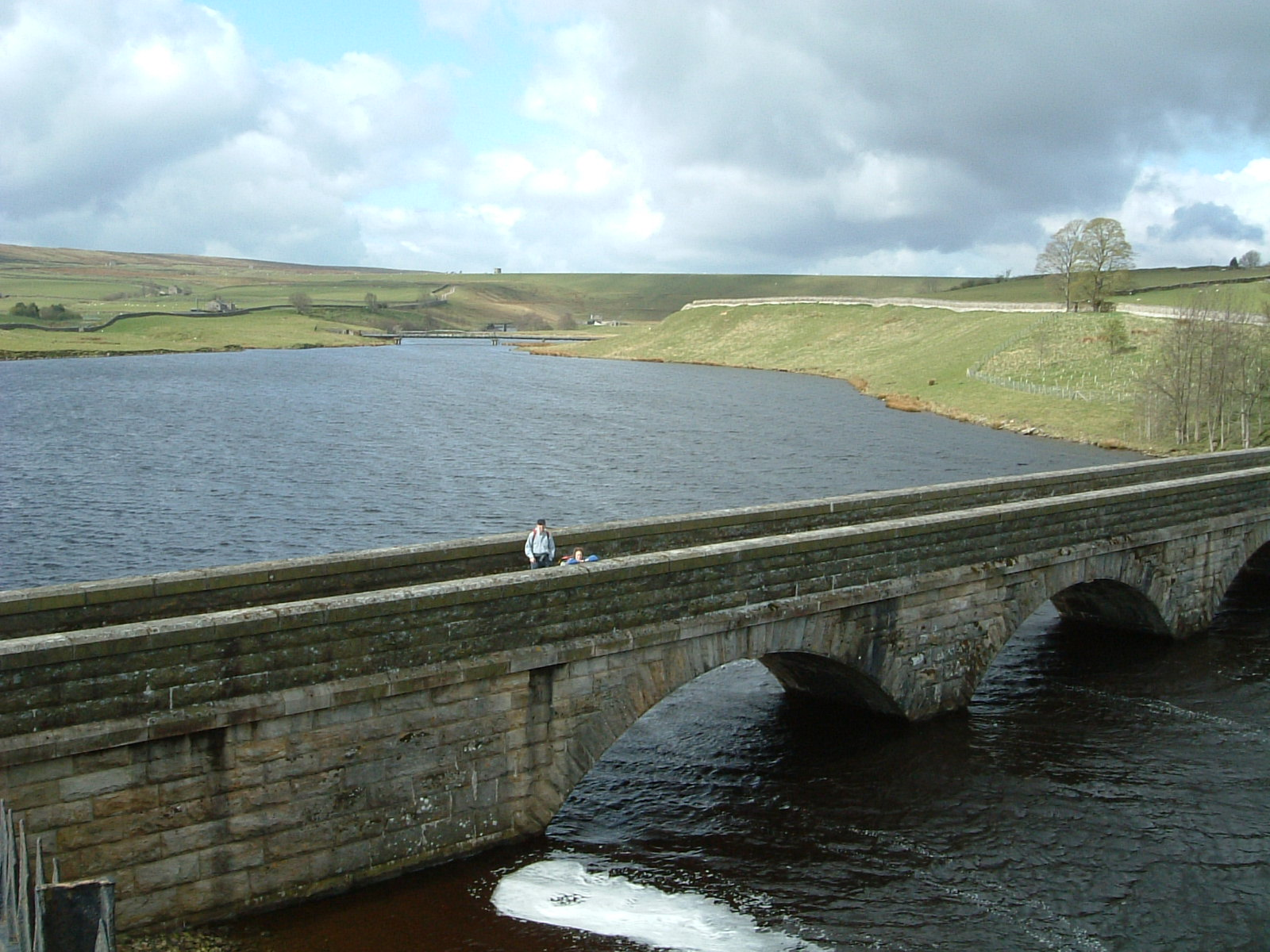
Grassholme Reservoir and Bridge, Lunedale. The flat grass hill on the horizon is in fact the dam of Selset Reservoir.

Lunedale is the dale, or valley, of the River Lune, on the east side of the Pennines in England, west of Middleton-in-Teesdale. Its principal settlements are Grassholme, Thringarth and Bowbank.

Lunedale is also the name of a civil parish which covers most of the north side of the dale. The population of the parish was not counted separately at the 2011 census, but the combined population of Lunedale and Holwick parishes was 187. Most of the south side of the dale is in the civil parish of Mickleton.

Lunedale was historically in the North Riding of Yorkshire, but since 1974 has been in County Durham.

The River Lune flows through Lunedale before reaching Teesdale where it joins the River Tees. The river flows through two reservoirs on the way: Selset Reservoir and Grassholme Reservoir. Running roughly parallel to Lunedale to the south is Baldersdale.

The Pennine Way passes through Lunedale on its way to Middleton-in-Teesdale, and crosses Grassholme Bridge over Grassholme Reservoir.

A former railway viaduct from the now-closed Barnard Castle to Middleton-in-Teesdale line crosses the River Lune just north of Mickleton.
