= Lartington =

Village in County Durham, England

Coordinates: 54.55447°N 1.9764°W

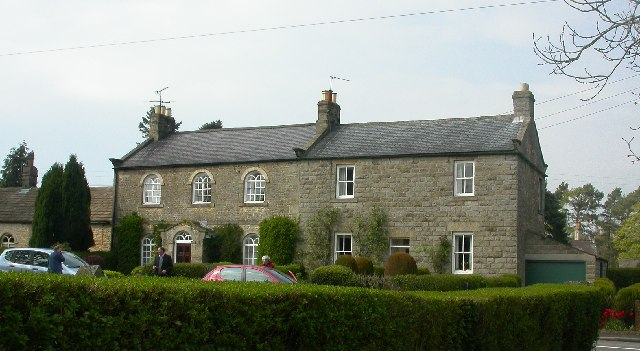
- Cottages at Lartington

- Location within County Durham
- Population: 135 (2011 Census)
- OS grid reference: NZ016176
- Civil parish: Lartington
- Unitary authority: County Durham
- Ceremonial county: County Durham
- Region: North East
- Country: England
- Sovereign state: United Kingdom
- Post town: Barnard Castle
- Postcode district: DL12
- Police: Durham
- Fire: County Durham and Darlington
- Ambulance: North East
- UK Parliament: Bishop Auckland

Lartington is a village and civil parish about 2 miles (3 km) west of the town of Barnard Castle, in Teesdale, in the Pennines of England. The 2011 Census recorded the parish's population as 135.

Lartington is historically in the North Riding of Yorkshire but along with the rest of the former Startforth Rural District it was transferred to County Durham for administrative and ceremonial purposes on 1 April 1974 under the Local Government Act 1972.

The parish is notable for Lartington Hall, the seat of the Roman Catholic Maire family. Lartington railway station was on the South Durham and Lancashire Union Railway, which is now abandoned. It opened in 1861 and closed in 1962.
