= Grassholme =

Village in County Durham, England

Coordinates: 54.590°N 2.116°W

- Location within County Durham
- OS grid reference: NY984207
- Unitary authority: County Durham
- Ceremonial county: County Durham
- Region: North East
- Country: England
- Sovereign state: United Kingdom
- Police: Durham
- Fire: County Durham and Darlington
- Ambulance: North East

Grassholme is a village in County Durham, England.

For centuries it lay within the historic county boundaries of the North Riding of Yorkshire, but, along with the rest of the former Startforth Rural District it was transferred to County Durham on 1 April 1974, under the provisions of the Local Government Act 1972.
