= Bowbank =

Coordinates: 54.60°N 02.09°W

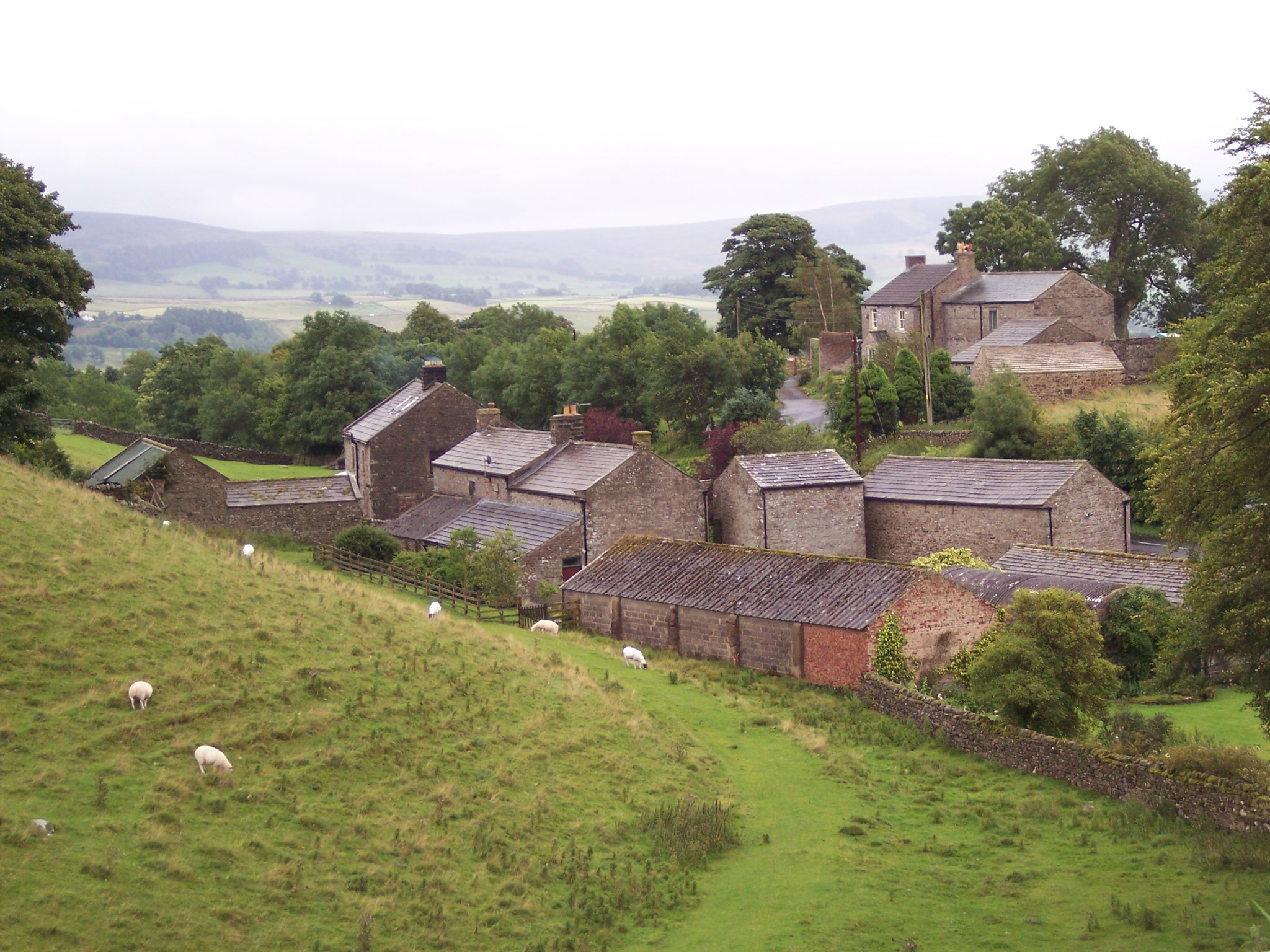
- Lowside, West Wood and Highside farms

- Location within County Durham
- OS grid reference: NY9423
- Civil parish: Lunedale
- Unitary authority: County Durham
- Ceremonial county: County Durham
- Region: North East
- Country: England
- Sovereign state: United Kingdom
- Police: Durham
- Fire: County Durham and Darlington
- Ambulance: North East

Bowbank is a hamlet in Lunedale, a side valley of Teesdale in County Durham, England. It is within Lunedale civil parish and is situated on the B6276 road, 1 mile (1.6 km) south of Middleton-in-Teesdale and 8 miles (13 km) north west of the town of Barnard Castle.

For centuries, it lay within the historic county boundaries of the North Riding of Yorkshire, but along with the rest of the former Startforth Rural District it was transferred to County Durham on 1 April 1974, under the provisions of the Local Government Act 1972.

The 19th-century Bowbank House and its attached wing is a Grade II listed building, as is West Wood Farmhouse and its separately listed byre-house and barn.
