= Thringarth =

Hamlet in County Durham, England

Coordinates: 54°36′6″N 2°6′31″W

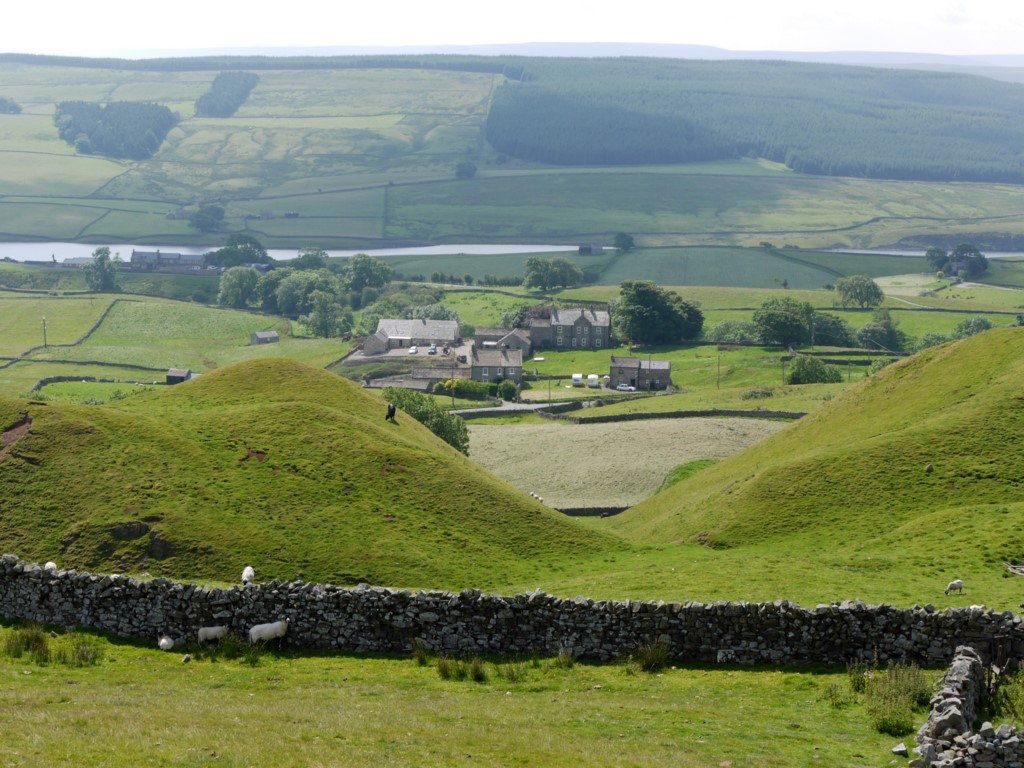

- Location within County Durham
- Civil parish: Lunedale
- Unitary authority: County Durham
- Ceremonial county: Durham
- Region: North East
- Country: England
- Sovereign state: United Kingdom
- Post town: BARNARD CASTLE
- Postcode district: DL12
- Police: Durham
- Fire: County Durham and Darlington
- Ambulance: North East

Thringarth is a hamlet in Lunedale, in the Pennines of England. It is traditionally located in the North Riding of Yorkshire but along with the rest of the former Startforth Rural District it was transferred to County Durham for administrative and ceremonial purposes on 1 April 1974, under the provisions of the Local Government Act 1972.
