= Middleton-in-Teesdale railway station =

Former railway station in County Durham, England

Coordinates: 54.6186°N 2.0839°W

Middleton-in-Teesdale
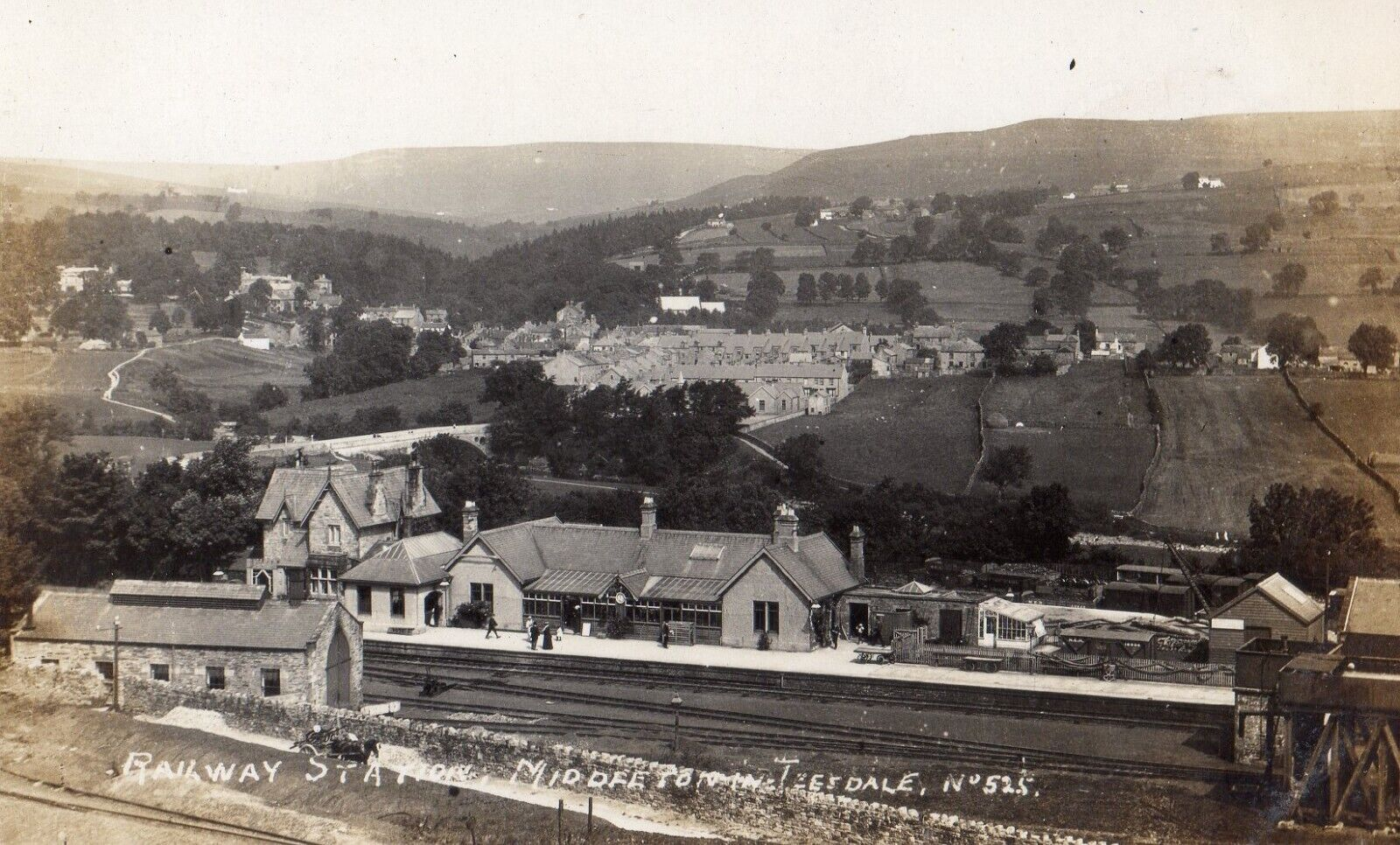

General information
- Location: Middleton-in-Teesdale; England

Other information
- Status: Disused

Key dates
- 12 May 1868: Opened
- 30 November 1964: Closed
Location

Middleton-in-Teesdale railway station was the terminus of the Tees Valley Railway from Barnard Castle. The station opened in May 1868, closing to all traffic in 1965.

== History ==
The station served the town of Middleton-in-Teesdale. The station opened to passenger traffic on 12 May 1868. It closed for passengers on 30 November 1964 and freight traffic on 5 April 1965. Until June 1894, the station was simply called Middleton, but a name change was instigated to differentiate it from the other stations on the network called Middleton.

Apart from Barnard Castle station, all other stations on the line were in the North Riding of Yorkshire, including Middleton-in-Teesdale which was 0.25 miles (0.40 km) south of the town itself. The town is on the north side of the River Tees placing it in County Durham. The railway company decided to build the station on the south side of the River Tees as they had already spent over £5,000 each on the viaducts over the rivers Lune and Balder on the line. Additionally, all the quarries were located on the south side of the river. The quarries despatched loads of roadstone, building stone, and barytes, whilst lead from the surrounding hills was also carried. Although the station was the terminus of the line, a junction just south of the station allowed a freight-only line to bypass the station area and proceed northwards up the valley for another 2 miles (3.2 km) to another quarry at Holwick Scar. The discovery of ironstone in the surrounding hills led to suggestions of extending the line up the valley from Middleton as a through route to Alston. The Midland Railway also showed interest in extending the line to Appleby-in-Westmorland.

When the station opened, it was furnished with a 45-foot (14 m) turntable, but an engine shed was not built until March 1869. The single-road engine shed was located on the south side of the station. The shed was closed in 1957 when DMUs took over operating the line, and then the building was demolished in 1961. The stationmaster's house was built with the station, but the ancillary buildings such as waiting rooms, were not constructed until 1888–1889. The station had just the one platform on the eastern side.

The railway clearing house from 1904 lists the station as being able to handle goods, cattle, horse-boxes, passengers, furniture vans and parcels. Besides the station goods yard, other goods terminals listed were for Co-Op, a sawmill, two quarries and a whinstone operation.

In the early hours of 31 January 2018, the former station house suffered serious structural damage in a fire, which was alleged to be the result of arson.

Preceding station	Disused railways	Following station
Mickleton	Tees Valley Railway	Terminus
