= Hope Moor Wind Farm =

Wind farm in Northern England

Hope Moor
- Arndale Beck on Hope Moor
- Country: England
- Location: County Durham; North Yorkshire
- Coordinates: 54.460°N 1.939°W
- Status: Proposed

Wind farm
- Type: Onshore
- Hub height: 200 metres (660 ft)

External links
- Website: hopemoor.co.uk

Hope Moor is a proposed onshore wind farm that straddles the North Yorkshire/County Durham border, in Northern England. In July 2025, the then Secretary of State for Energy Security and Net Zero confirmed that the Hope Moor development would be designated as a nationally significant infrastructure project (NSIP), and as such, would not be decided through the normal planning process, but be applied for via the Department for Energy Security and Net Zero (DESNZ).

== History ==
A wind farm on Hope Moor was first proposed in 2025 by Fred. Olsen Renewables Limited (FORL). The site is located across the border of two English counties; County Durham, and North Yorkshire, with the site being adjacent to, but not within, the Yorkshire Dales National Park. FORL have planned for 23 wind turbines at a height of 200 metres (660 ft) above ground level on Hope Moor, (which undulates across the planned wind farm area) but is listed at about 503 metres (1,650 ft) above sea level, making the turbines visible in the Lake District on a clear day. The developer also stated that the footprint of the project would be 1,100 hectares (2,700 acres). The site lies some 8 kilometres (5 mi) south of Barnard Castle in County Durham, and 12 kilometres (7.5 mi) north-west of Richmond, in North Yorkshire.

Opponents have formed the Hope Moor Wind Farm Action Group, and notable supporters of the group include the Duke of Norfolk, Ian Botham and Alan Hinkes, who said it was the "right development in the wrong place". The action group also pointed out that FORL run another wind farm at Crystal Rig in the Scottish Borders, where the initial application was for 25 turbines, which was then extended under phase II to sixty, then another six and a further eleven under phase IV. There is now also a solar farm on the Crystal Rig site. FORL responded to these worries by stating "While some of our other renewable energy projects have been extended over time, we currently have no plans to increase the number of turbines at Hope Moor should the project receive planning consent." Former Prime Minister Rishi Sunak whose constituency borders the wind farm area stated that he could not "support a plan which will lead to the views from many parts of the trail (the Coast to Coast Walk) - some of the most beautiful - being spoilt in this way." Sunak also objected to the destruction of the peatland for siting the turbines and the access roads needed.

Opponents to the scheme have also pointed out that whilst the area is outside of any national parks, it is designated by Natural England as a blanket bog, with peat up to 30 centimetres (12 in) in depth. The location and height of the turbines also led to the Royal Air Force (RAF) objecting in that it would cause a "physical obstruction" to low-flying aircraft, and that the site would also cause interference to RRH Brizlee Wood air defence radar and RAF Leeming air traffic control. FORL stated that they will "continue to work with the MoD to ensure that the project mitigates any potential interaction with military operations, radar and telecommunications, and flight paths". The issue of the wind farm affecting air-traffic control was an issue also backed up by the National Air Traffic Services (NATS), which stated that it would cause "unacceptable interference with air traffic control radar."

FORL stated in their initial outlay in 2025 that the site would generate 100 megawatts, enough electricity to power 81,000 homes and businesses, but in 2026, this was rated as 150 megawatts, enough power for 135,000 homes and businesses. Supporters of the scheme point out that the wind farm would also provide energy security, meaning less reliance on imported electricity. As the wind farm has been designated as an NSIP (Nationally Significant Infrastructure Project), it will not be subject to the normal planning approvals process, with the final approval resting with the Secretary of State for Energy Security and Net Zero.

== See also ==
- Fraisthorpe Wind Farm
- Knabs Ridge Wind Farm
- Ovenden Moor Wind Farm
