= Mickleton, County Durham =

Village and civil parish in England

Coordinates: 54.60877°N 2.05569°W

Mickleton
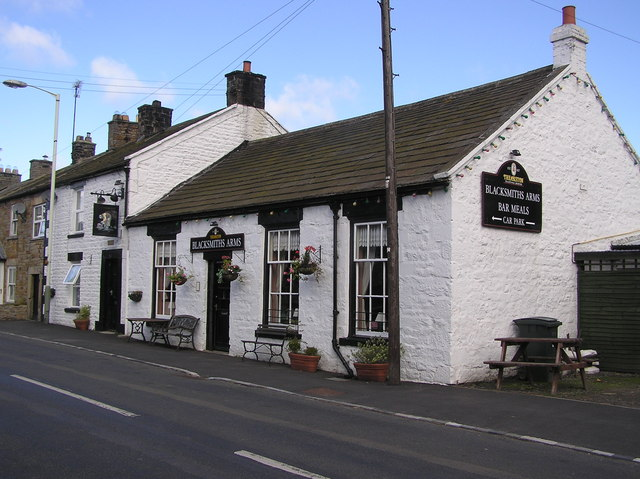
- Blacksmith's Arms pub, Mickleton

- Location within County Durham
- Population: 413 (2011)
- OS grid reference: NY965237
- Unitary authority: County Durham
- Ceremonial county: County Durham
- Region: North East
- Country: England
- Sovereign state: United Kingdom
- Post town: Barnard Castle
- Postcode district: DL12
- Police: Durham
- Fire: County Durham and Darlington
- Ambulance: North East
- UK Parliament: Bishop Auckland

Mickleton is a village and civil parish in Teesdale, County Durham, England, situated 8.5 miles (13.7 km) north west of Barnard Castle. Lying within the historic boundaries of the North Riding of Yorkshire, the village along with the rest of the former Startforth Rural District has been administered with County Durham since 1 April 1974, under the provisions of the Local Government Act 1972

== History ==
In 1086, the village was recorded in the Domesday Book, with a population of 37 households.

In 1870-72 John Marius Wilson's Imperial Gazetteer of England and Wales described Mickleton as:

"a township in Romald-Kirk parish, N. R. Yorkshire; on the Tees river and Tees Valley railway, 7¼ miles NW of Barnard-Castle. It has a post office under Darlington, a r. station, a chapel of ease, chapels for Wesleyans and Primitive Methodists, and a free school. Acres, 4,890. Real property, £3,169. Pop., 688. Houses, 122. Most of the surface is high moorland.

A railway station on the Tees Valley Railway served the village between 1868 and 1964.

Mickleton is situated by the meeting of the Lune River, as it leaves Lunedale, and joins the Tees, behind Mickleton on the Lunedale Hills looms the Bronze Age burial site of Kirkcarrion.

== Governance ==
Mickleton was part of the local government district of Teesdale from 1974 before it was abolished as part of the 2009 structural changes to local government in England. For the purposes of Durham County Council elections, Mickleton is located in the Barnard Castle West ward.

The village lies within the Bishop Auckland parliamentary constituency.

== Community and culture ==
Mickleton village hall was built in 1993, and formally opened in 1994 by the Earl of Strathmore Michael Bowes-Lyon, it is a multi-purpose venue, hosting monthly parish council meetings, private functions and entertainment events such as Mickleton Live, which has seen performances from acts such as guitarist Albert Lee

The village has two public houses, The Crown and The Blacksmith's Arms, as well as an independently owned filling station.
