= Hury =

Coordinates: 54.58861°N 2.09006°W

- Location within County Durham
- OS grid reference: NY942214
- Unitary authority: County Durham
- Ceremonial county: County Durham
- Region: North East
- Country: England
- Sovereign state: United Kingdom
- Police: Durham
- Fire: County Durham and Darlington
- Ambulance: North East

Hury is a village in Baldersdale, in the Pennines of England. It is located in the historic North Riding of Yorkshire. Along with the rest of the former Startforth Rural District it has been treated as part of County Durham for administrative and ceremonial purposes since 1 April 1974, under the provisions of the Local Government Act 1972.
