= Romaldkirk =

Village in County Durham, England

Coordinates: 54.59358°N 2.01049°W

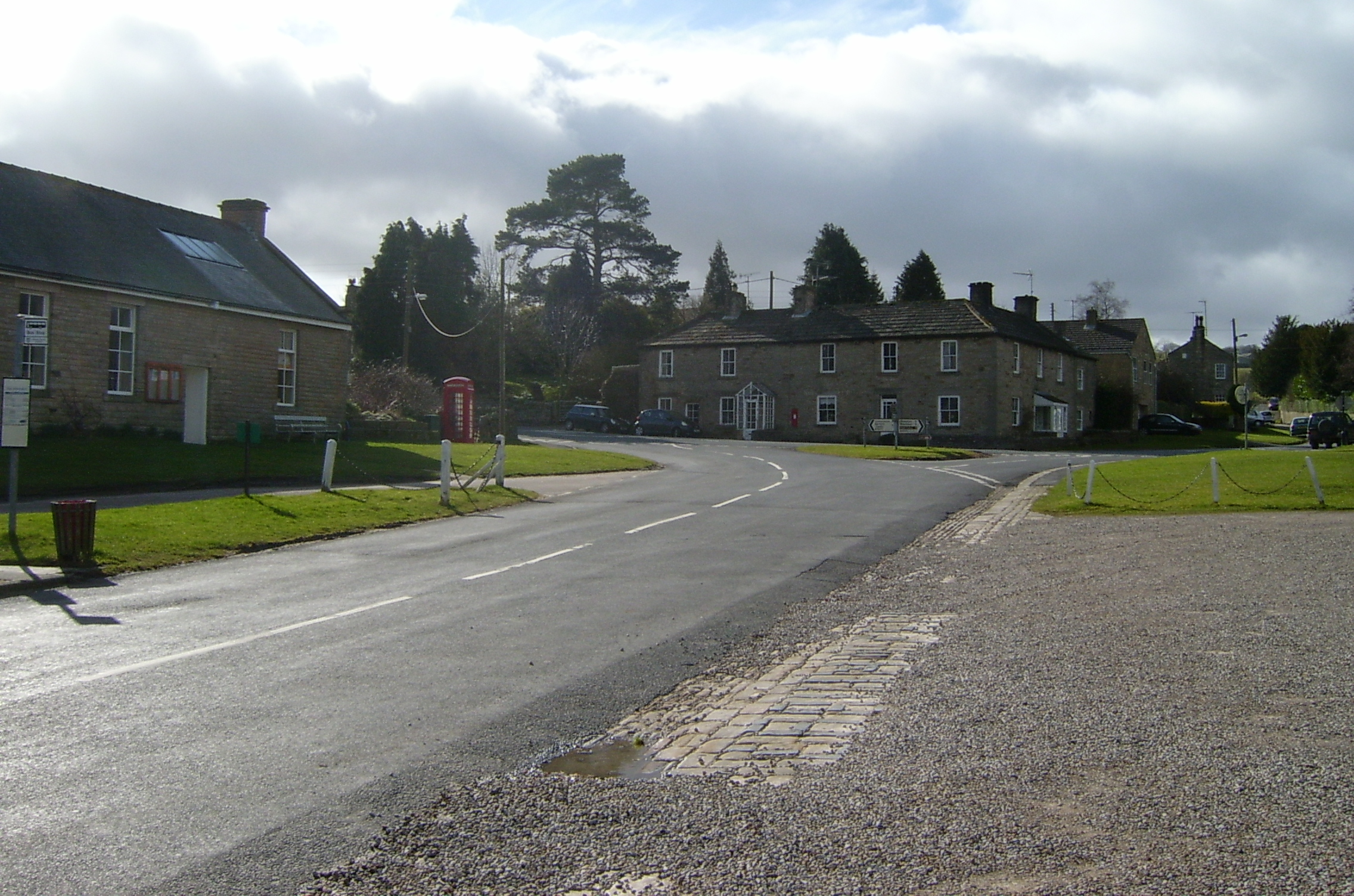
- Romaldkirk village main street

- Location within County Durham
- Population: 169 (2011)
- OS grid reference: NY994220
- Unitary authority: County Durham
- Ceremonial county: County Durham
- Region: North East
- Country: England
- Sovereign state: United Kingdom
- Post town: Barnard Castle
- Postcode district: DL12
- Police: Durham
- Fire: County Durham and Darlington
- Ambulance: North East
- UK Parliament: Bishop Auckland

Romaldkirk is a village in Teesdale, in the Pennines of England. The village lies within the historic boundaries of the North Riding of Yorkshire, but has been administered by County Durham since 1974.

It is thought that the name might be derived from St. Rumwold (also spelt Romald or Rumbold), a little-known Saxon saint who is said to have preached the Gospel after his baptism as an infant; his resting place is recorded as being in Buckingham.

The village was formerly served by Romaldkirk railway station.

Thomas Page, the engineer, grew up in Romaldkirk.

The architects Maxwell Fry and Jane Drew, and famous farmer Hannah Hauxwell are buried near the village church.

The church is a Grade I listed building, containing surviving sections of Anglo-Saxon walls either side of the chancel arch, as well as a late medieval rood stair, a stone tomb effigy of Hugh Fitz Henry (who died on campaign with Edward I in 1305) in chain mail, a 12th-century font, and a pulpit (originally part of a three decker) from the early 18th century.
