= Selset Reservoir =

Reservoir in County Durham, England

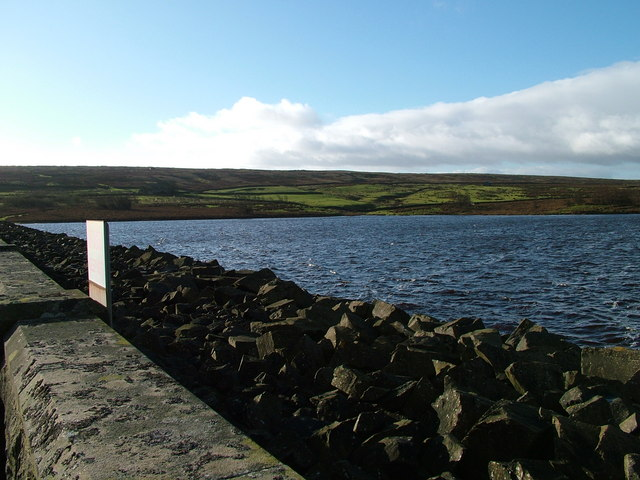
- Selset Reservoir

- Location within County Durham
- Location: County Durham, England
- Coordinates: 54°35′6″N 2°8′6″W
- Type: Reservoir
- Primary inflows: River Lune
- Primary outflows: River Lune
- Managing agency: Northumbrian Water
- Surface elevation: 310 m (1,020 ft)

Selset Reservoir is a reservoir in County Durham, England. It is situated in Lunedale which is a side valley of the River Tees, about 5 miles (8 km) west of Middleton-in-Teesdale. It supplies water for Teesdale and is owned by Northumbrian Water. It was built in 1961 and its main use (apart from water supply) is sailing.

== See also ==
- List of reservoirs and dams in the United Kingdom
