= River Lune, Durham =

River in Cumbria and County Durham, England

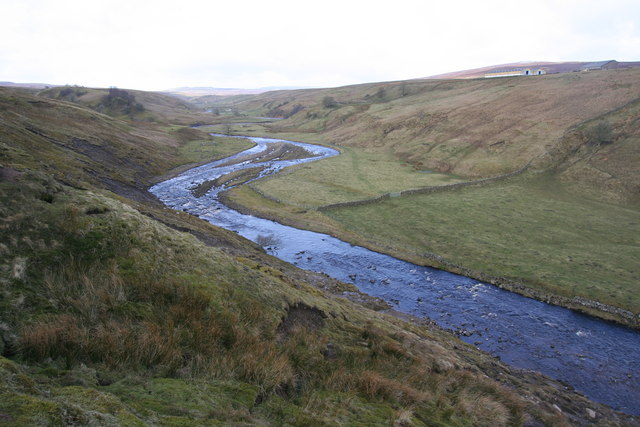
Upper River Lune near Selset Reservoir

The River Lune is a river in County Durham, England.

The Lune rises close to Lune Head Farm at the confluence of Lune Head Beck (considered by some the upper part of the Lune) and Cleve Beck. Lune Head Beck itself is formed by the meeting of Connypot Beck and Goal Sike, flowing eastward from Cumbria.

The river flows eastward through Lunedale to Selset Reservoir, after which it turns north east and feeds Grassholme Reservoir, before continuing to join the River Tees at Mickleton.

== Settlements (from source) ==
- Grains o' th' Beck
- Thringarth
- Bowbank
- Mickleton

== Tributaries (from source) ==
- Cleve Beck
  - Rayback Sike
- Lune Head Beck
  - Connypot Beck
  - Goal Sike
- Long Grain
- Rennygill Sike
- Dowhill Sike
- Grow Sike
- Soulgill Beck
- Rowantree Beck
- Hargill Beck
