= Grassholme Reservoir =

Reservoir in County Durham, England

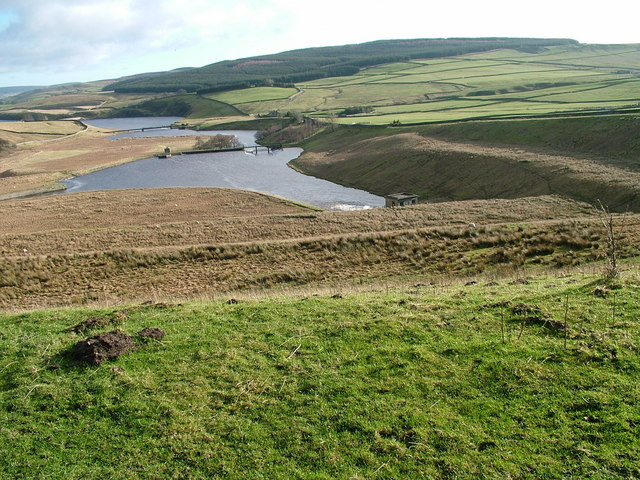
- Grassholme Reservoir seen from the Selset Reservoir outflow

- Location within County Durham
- Location: England
- Coordinates: 54°35′46″N 2°5′46″W
- Type: Reservoir
- Primary inflows: River Lune
- Primary outflows: River Lune
- Managing agency: Northumbrian Water
- Surface elevation: 310 m (1,020 ft)

Grassholme Reservoir is a large reservoir in County Durham, England. It is situated in Lunedale, which is a side valley of the River Tees, about 2 miles (3.2 km) south of Middleton-in-Teesdale. It supplies water for Teesdale and Teesside and is owned by Northumbrian Water. Its main recreational use is as an angling centre.

The reservoir was built between 1900 and 1914, with a final price of £534,150; the extra time and excessive cost was put down to poor ground conditions.

== See also ==
- List of reservoirs and dams in the United Kingdom
