= Cotherstone =

Village in County Durham, England

Coordinates: 54.57254°N 1.9832°W

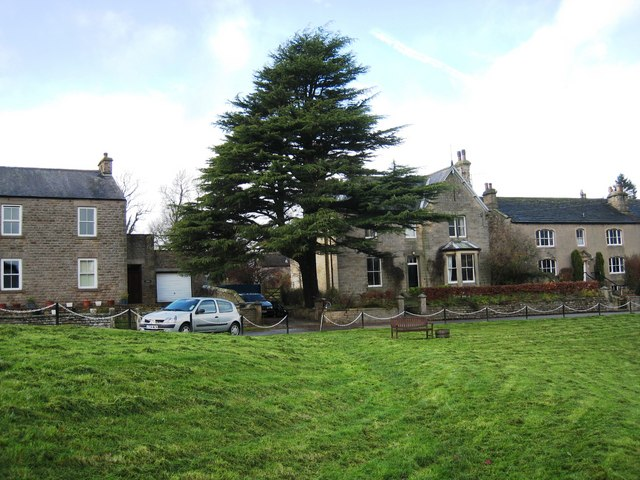
- The village green

- Location within County Durham
- Population: 554 (2021 census)
- OS grid reference: NZ011197
- Unitary authority: County Durham
- Ceremonial county: County Durham
- Region: North East
- Country: England
- Sovereign state: United Kingdom
- Post town: Barnard Castle
- Postcode district: DL12
- Police: Durham
- Fire: County Durham and Darlington
- Ambulance: North East
- UK Parliament: Bishop Auckland

Cotherstone is a village and civil parish in the district and county of Durham, England, historically in Yorkshire. Cotherstone cheese is a celebrated delicacy of the village, famed since at least 1858.

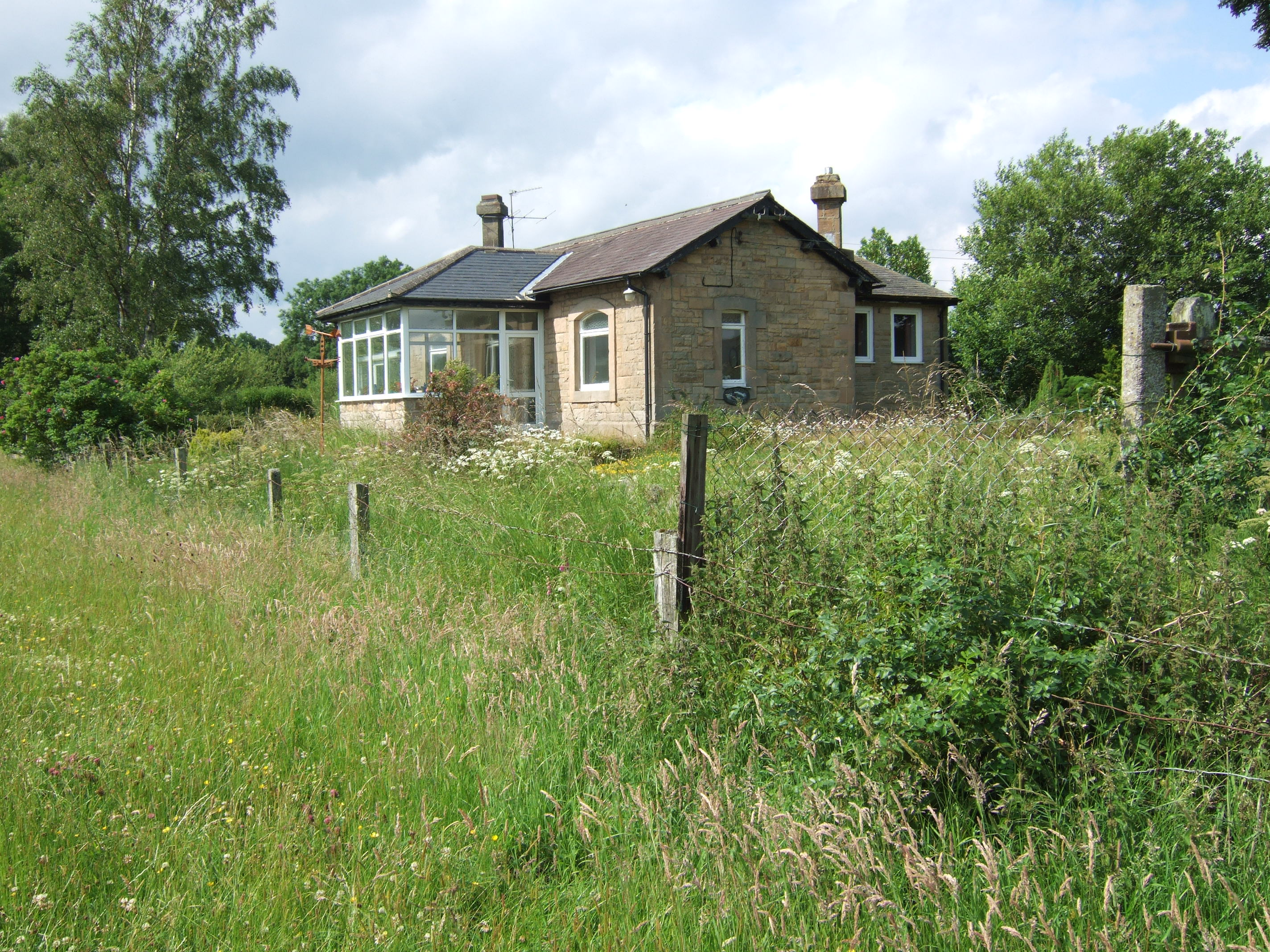
Cotherstone railway station; disused and now a private residence

Cotherstone railway station was between Barnard Castle and Middleton on the now-closed Middleton-in-Teesdale Branch Line. The railway line crossed the River Balder at the Balder Viaduct just north of Cotherstone.

== Governance ==
At the lower level of local government, Cotherstone is a civil parish with a parish council of seven elected members.

At the upper level, it is in the unitary County Durham District. For elections to Durham County Council it is in Upper Teesdale electoral ward.

Being just south of the River Tees, Cotherstone was historically in the North Riding of Yorkshire. It was a township in the parish of Romaldkirk until 1866, when it became a separate parish. From 1894 until 1974 it was part of Startforth Rural District. In the local government reorganisation of 1974, all of Startforth district was transferred to the new Teesdale district in County Durham, as it was near Barnard Castle, the district's administrative centre. In 2009, Teesdale was merged into the unitary County Durham district.

== Demographics ==
At the 2021 census, Cotherstone civil parish had a population of 554 people in 260 households.

Census population of Cotherstone parish
Census	Population	Female	Male	Households	Source
2001	552	285	267	240	
2011	594	308	286	260	
2021	554	282	272	260	

== Notable people ==
Hannah Hauxwell, who became famous through a 1970s Yorkshire Television documentary, farmed near Cotherstone and in 1988 moved to the village itself.

In 1973, Maxwell Fry and his wife Jane Drew, both modernist architects, retired to Cotherstone.

The jurist John Cyril Smith was born in the village in 1922.

Miles Stapleton was a notable Lord of Cotherstone (among other places) during the fourteenth century.

John Bowes bred four winners of The Derby at nearby Streatlam Castle (since demolished), including Cotherstone.

Bentley Beetham, the mountaineer, ornithologist and photographer retired here in 1949. He was a member of the 1924 British Mount Everest expedition.
