= Barnard Castle railway station =

Disused railway station in County Durham, England

Coordinates: 54.553°N 1.921°W

Barnard Castle
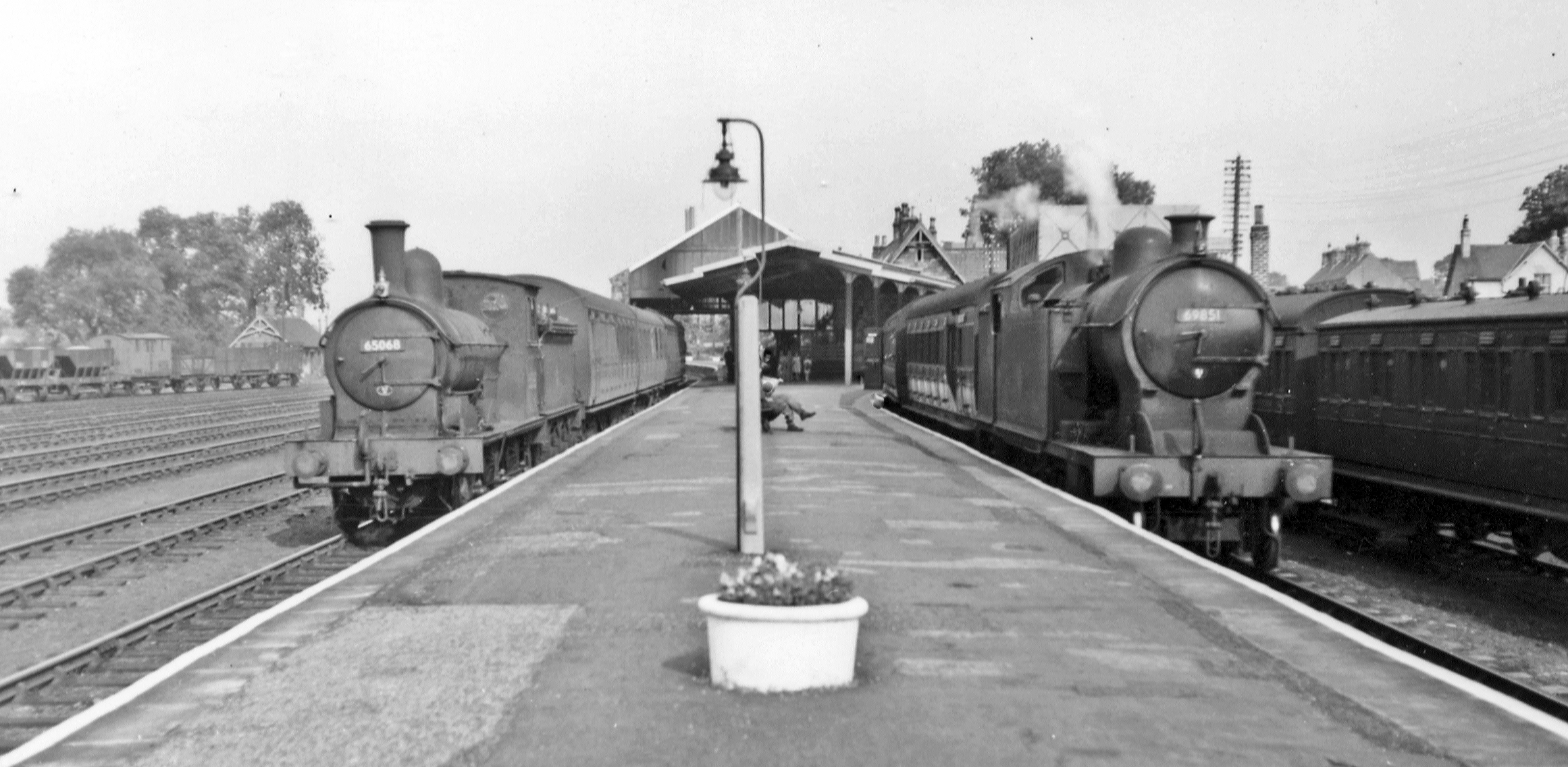
- Barnard Castle railway station in 1953

General information
- Location: Barnard Castle; England
- Grid reference: NZ053169

Other information
- Status: Disused

Key dates
- 9 July 1856: 1st station opened
- 8 August 1861: second station opened
- 1 May 1862: 1st station closed to passengers
- 30 November 1964: 2nd station closed
- 1965: First station closed to freight
Location

Barnard Castle railway station was situated on the South Durham & Lancashire Union Railway (Stainmore Line) between Bishop Auckland and Kirkby Stephen East. The railway station served the town of Barnard Castle.

The first station (at grid reference NZ053169) was opened on the Darlington and Barnard Castle Railway on 9 July 1856, and was closed to passengers on 1 May 1862 when services were diverted to the second station on the South Durham & Lancashire Railway which had opened in 1861. Freight traffic continued to use the first station until 1965.

Despite being a junction station for three lines, Barnard Castle only had one through platform and two bay platforms.

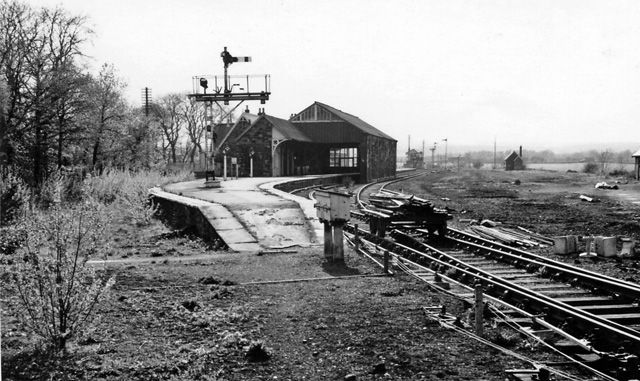
Barnard Castle railway station in 1965

Regular passenger services to Tebay ceased in 1952, with the remainder of the Stainmore Line to Bishop Auckland and Kirkby Stephen East shutting in 1962. The station remained in use for the lines to Darlington and Middleton-in-Teesdale until 1964 when it was shut as the result of the Beeching Axe.

Today the site of the second station is a car park for the nearby GlaxoSmithKline factory. The first station has been converted into private houses and the first station's portico now resides in Valley Gardens in Saltburn.

Preceding station	Disused railways	Following station
Broomielaw	North Eastern Railway; Darlington and Barnard Castle Railway	Terminus
Lartington	North Eastern Railway; South Durham & Lancashire Union Railway	Cockfield Fell
Terminus	North Eastern Railway; Tees Valley Railway	Cotherstone
