= River Balder =

River in County Durham, England

Coordinates: 54°35′N 1°59′W

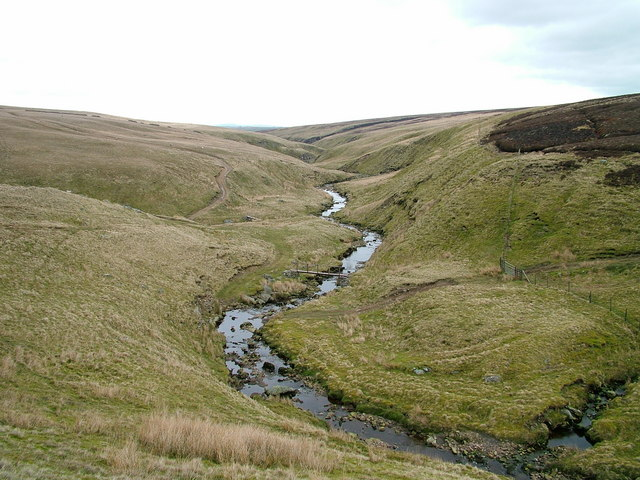
- The Balder and Black Beck meet

Location
- Country: England

Physical characteristics
- Source
  - location: Stainmore Common
  - elevation: 480 m (1,570 ft)
- Mouth
  - location: River Tees
- Length: 23.4 km (14.5 mi)

The Balder is an English river that rises on the eastern slope of Stainmore Common in the Pennine Chain and flows eastwards for about 23.4 kilometres (14.5 mi), before joining the River Tees at Cotherstone.

The River Balder is in County Durham, but until 1974, it was in the North Riding of Yorkshire. The head of the valley is a bleak moorland, with hills around it exceeding 500 feet (150 m). the name is first recorded in the 13th century, and is thought to derive from an Old English personal name (B(e)aldhere), with possibly the river valley being named Baldersdale first, and the river being named later.

For the first 4 kilometres (2.5 mi), the watercourse runs as Balder Beck, before meeting Black Beck and forming the River Balder proper at NY886173. The River Balder enters Balderhead Reservoir about 7 kilometres (4.3 mi) from the source, at 336 metres (1,102 ft) above sea level. It spills into two more reservoirs further down Baldersdale: Blackton Reservoir and Hury Reservoir.

The scenery becomes gentler as it descends past Baldersdale Youth Hostel. The distinctive flat peak of Goldsborough to the south is passed before the valley begins to open out as the river enters Blackton Reservoir at 285 metres (935 ft).

The course of the valley carries on at a virtually exactly east direction as the River Balder enters Hury Reservoir at about 260 m (850 ft), passing the village of Hury which lies to the north.

The river now begins to twist and turn and is crossed by the grade II listed, nine-arched Balder Railway Viaduct, which was used by the Barnard Castle to Middleton-in-Teesdale railway line before it was closed.

It finally joins the River Tees at Cotherstone, at a height of about 162 metres (531 ft).

== See also ==
- Baldersdale
- Rivers of the United Kingdom
