= Kingston House, Kingston upon Hull =

1960s modernist block in Kingston upon Hull, England

Kingston House
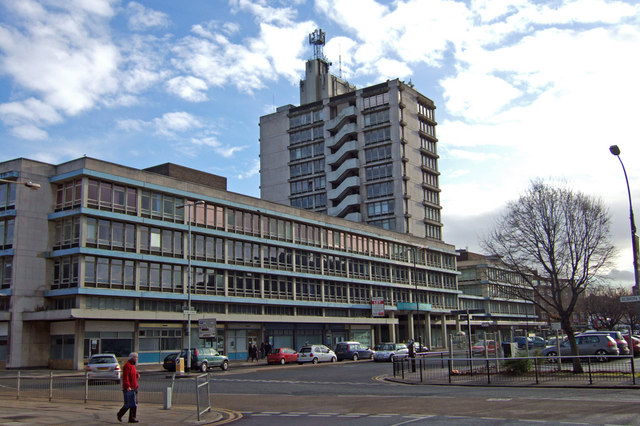
- Kingston House
- Interactive map of the Kingston House area

General information
- Architectural style: Modernist
- Location: Kingston House, Bond Street, HU1 3ER, Kingston upon Hull
- Coordinates: 53.746064°N 0.339236°W
- OS grid reference: TA096290
- Construction started: 1965
- Construction stopped: 1967

Technical details
- Material: Concrete
- Floor count: 12

Design and construction
- Architect: Edwin Maxwell Fry
- Architecture firm: Fry, Drew and Partners

Kingston House is a tower block and low rise office development built in Kingston upon Hull, England, in the 1960s in a modernist style.

== History ==
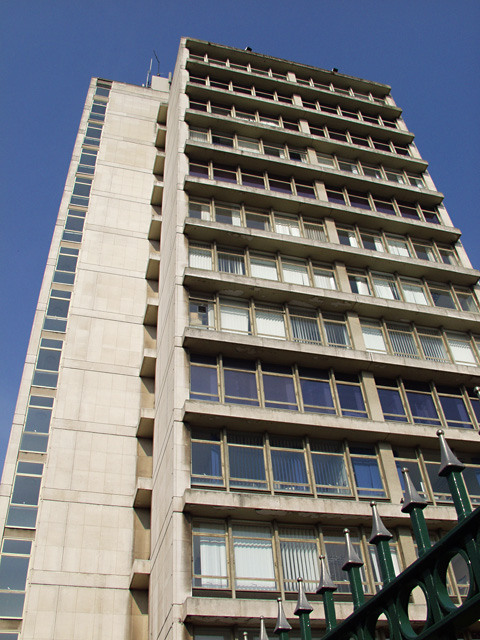
The tower block

Kingston House is a multi storey office development built 1965-7 to the design of Fry, Drew and Partners. (Note: Edwin Maxwell Fry was the architect. See also Jane Drew.) The building was one of a number of high or medium rise concrete buildings built in the city in the post Second World War period including the main building of Hull College, 'Telephone House' (Carr Lane), and the Hull Royal Infirmary, as well as numerous high rise tower blocks.

Before the Hull Blitz bombing of 1941–5 the area contained buildings of a type common in the town area north of Queen's Dock, dating to before the 1850s. (The 'Georgian old town'.) At the end of the war much of the street had been destroyed or was ruinous. The facing Bond Street was widened in the late 1950s/early 1960s as part of an uncompleted redevelopment scheme. The building was originally intended to form part of an (unbuilt) wider redevelopment in the area, including a hotel, shopping centre on the other side of Bond Street.

The building consists of a low rise (3 storey) building with wings on either side (north and south) of a 12-storey tower block. The buildings were constructed using a concrete frame with infilled panels. The total site area is 3,147 square metres (33,870 sq ft) and the total floor area 11,416 square metres (122,880 sq ft). Floor area per deck on the upper tower block (floors 5–12) was 417.4 square metres (4,493 sq ft).

The modernist design fell out of favour during the latter half of the 20th century, and by the 21st century the building was often referred to as an 'eyesore'. In the Hull Pevsner architectural guide (Neave & Neave 2010) it is described as "uninspired".

Office tenants included Humberside County Council (up to 1980), later Humberside Police, and after 1996 Hull City Council.

In 2014 the council offered the building for sale after relocating staff based there as part of cost-cutting exercises; demolition and wider redevelopment were seen at the time as potential options for the site, alternative plans (2015, withdrawn) included redevelopment of the buildings as apartments.

As of 2014 the buildings were also used for various telecommunications equipment including aerial leases to Vodafone, Arqiva, Orange PCS, Cable & Wireless, and EE/Hutchison 3G.

In mid 2017 Trade-park Ltd. acquired the property from Hull City Council. In September 2017 the company announced plans to convert the building into a combination development named "K2", consisting of a 100-bed hotel, 14 apartments, and office space. The first tenants moved into the complex in February 2018.
