= Denys Lasdun =

English architect (1914–2001)

Sir Denys Lasdun CH CBE RA
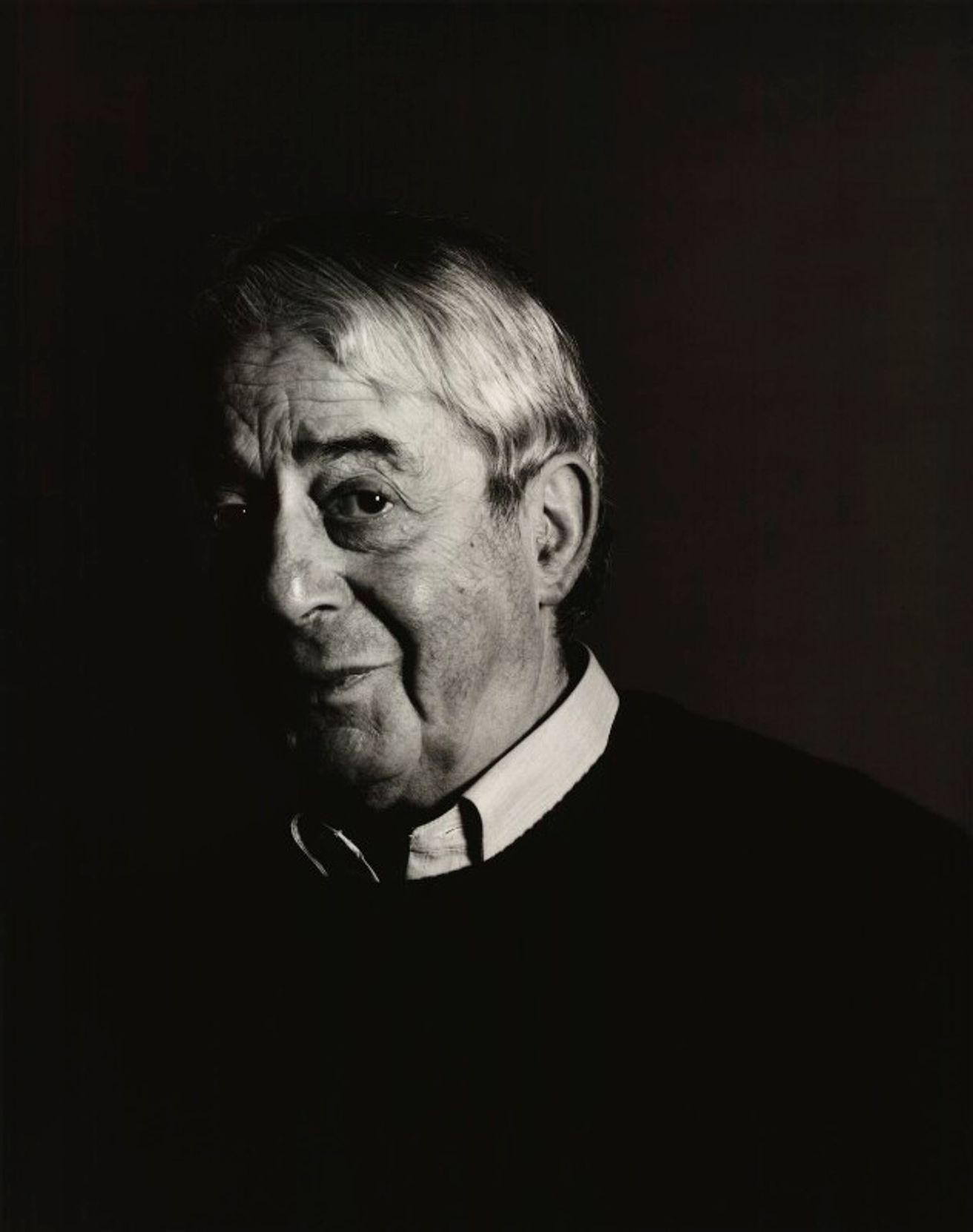
- Lasdun in 1985
- Born: 8 September 1914; Kensington, London, England
- Died: 11 January 2001 (aged 86); Fulham, London, England
- Occupation: Architect
- Awards: RIBA Royal Gold Medal
- Practice: Denys Lasdun & Partners
- Projects: National Theatre, London; Royal College of Physicians, London; University of East Anglia; Institute of Education, University of London; European Investment Bank, Luxembourg

Sir Denys Louis Lasdun, (8 September 1914 – 11 January 2001) was an English architect. Hailed as "the greatest English architect of the early heroic modern period", his most known work is the Royal National Theatre, on London's South Bank of the Thames, which is a Grade II* listed building and one of the most notable examples of Brutalist design in the United Kingdom.

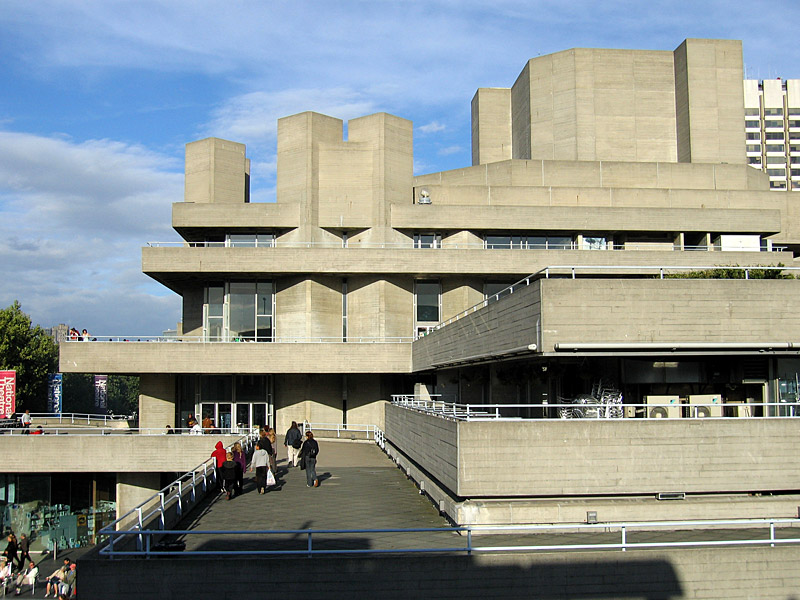
Royal National Theatre

Lasdun studied at the Architectural Association School of Architecture in London, and was a junior in the practice of Wells Coates. Like other Modernist architects, including Sir Basil Spence and Peter and Alison Smithson, Lasdun was much influenced by Le Corbusier and Ludwig Mies van der Rohe, but there was a gentler, more classical influence, too, from the likes of Nicholas Hawksmoor. Lasdun was elected a Royal Academician on 29 May 1991.

== Early life ==
Lasdun's grandfather, the Australia-based tobacconist Louis Abrahams (1852–1903), was an important patron of Frederick McCubbin, Arthur Streeton and other artists associated with the Heidelberg School art movement, also known as Australian Impressionism. His art collection was passed down to Lasdun. Denys Lasdun was the son of Nathan Lasdun (1879–1920) and Julie (née Abrahams; 1884–1963); Julie Lasdun was a pianist who accompanied the Hungarian violinist Adila Fachiri. In 1930 she played in the first chamber performance of Constant Lambert's The Rio Grande, alongside Arthur Benjamin. The Royal College of Music commemorated her through the Julie Lasdun Prize.

== Early work ==
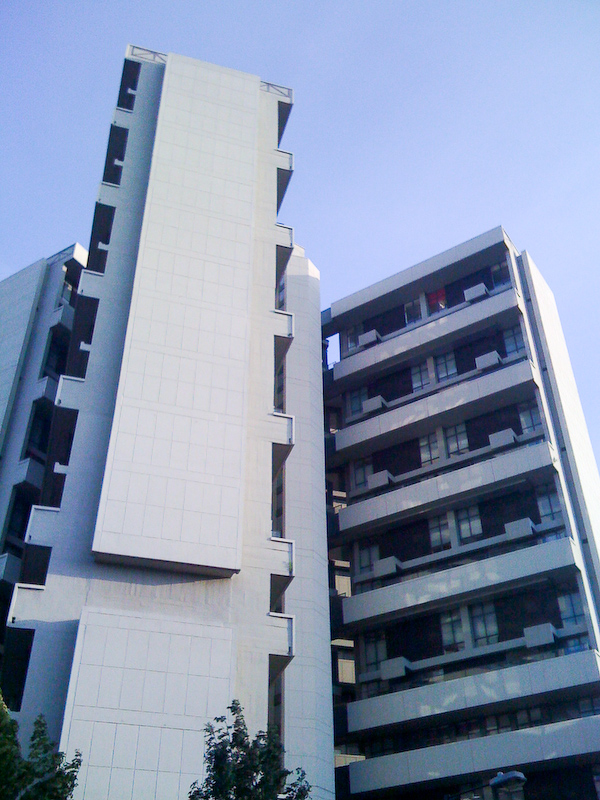
Keeling House in 2008

Before and after Second World War service in the army, Lasdun worked for a while with Berthold Lubetkin's Tecton practice, becoming a partner. During this period he also completed one private house in Paddington, in Le Corbusier's style. After the war, Lasdun worked with Lindsay Drake on the Hallfield Estate, which had been planned by Lubetkin and Tecton in a similar patterned, tightly planned idiom to his Spa Green and Priory Green Estates. Lasdun's Hallfield School was the first clue to his mature style, in its use of bare concrete and angularity, as well as its more human scale.

In the 1950s he was a partner with Jane Drew, Maxwell Fry and Lindsay Drake in Fry, Drew, Drake and Lasdun. His originality became more evident in his 'cluster blocks' in Bethnal Green. These were a response to the critique of much post-war development for creating an isolating environment and discouraging community. The cluster blocks grouped flats around a central tower, and tenants were intended to be able to pick out their own flats in the structure. The earlier blocks at Usk Street of 1954 were medium-sized, while the later block Keeling House is high-rise. In the late 1980s Keeling House was slated for demolition by the London Borough of Tower Hamlets, who had found it difficult to manage; following a pre-emptive listing was sold to a private developer for conversion to privately owned flats, and the Lasdun adjacent low-rise slab blocks of social housing were removed at the same time. Lasdun made an excursion into luxury housing with his St James' Place flats in 1958, the plan of which was partly derived from social housing models such as the Narkomfin Building.

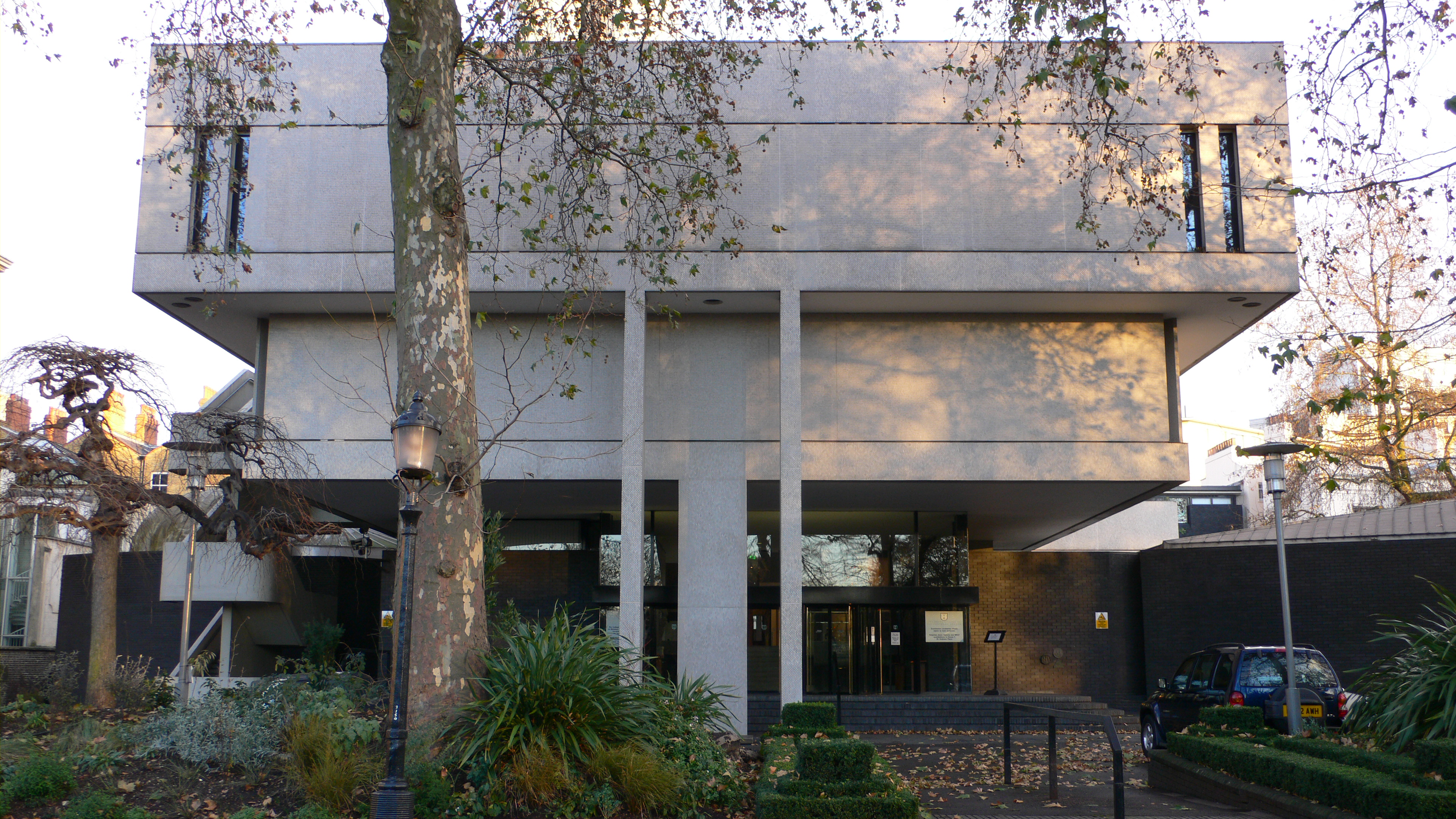
The Royal College of Physicians building is one of very few Grade I-listed post-Second World War buildings

Lasdun completed what may be regarded as his breakthrough masterwork in the Royal College of Physicians building in Regent's Park (1964). Inserted into a nationally important Nash set-piece terrace of neoclassical form, the RCP projects a raised linear form perpendicular to the terrace to create a series of gardens and spaces around the building, with annexes for lecture hall and an historic timber panelled room preserved from the earlier Colleges. Using modern reinforced concrete technology and highly expressive structural methods, the volumes are made to 'float in space' on the slimmest of supports to dissolve spatial boundaries between inside and out. The work makes implicit references to the work of the 'high modernists' from le Corbusier and Mies to the 'Scandinavian modernism' of Aalto, Asplund and Jacobsen as well as the contemporary Brutalist aesthetics of the era, yet developing a personal idiom of opened cantilevered volumes, long perspectives, triangulated form, and clarity of concept and structure that is entirely Lasdun's own. This building, however, is finished in luxurious white Sicilian marble, Murano glass mosaic tiles, polished brass and black engineering brick, and was one of the first post-War buildings to be awarded Grade I listing for national and international significance and influence on the work of others.

== University buildings ==
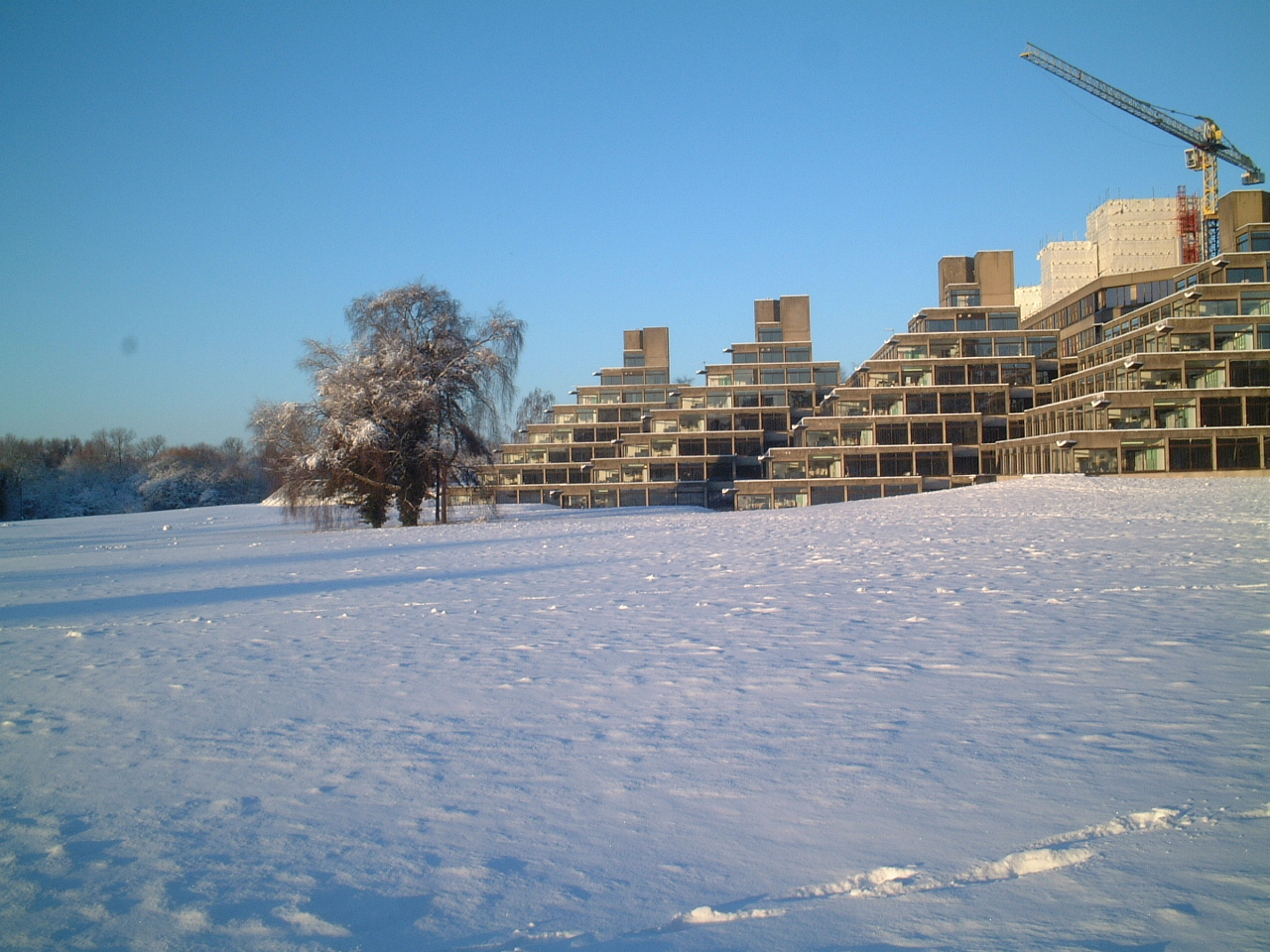
Norfolk Terrace halls of residence at the University of East Anglia

Elements of Lasdun's most famous style, which combined cubic towers, bare concrete and jutting foyers, which was compared by some to Frank Lloyd Wright, can be found in his first educational buildings, the Fitzwilliam College, Cambridge and the Royal College of Physicians in Regent's Park, the latter of which compared favourably to the surrounding buildings by John Nash. More extensive was his design for the University of East Anglia. This consisted of a series of classrooms and laboratories connected by walkways, and glazed residential quarters shaped like ziggurats. Following this acclaimed design Lasdun designed two buildings for the University of London, one for SOAS (1970) and another for the Institute of Education (1970–1976) (now a part of UCL), which was particularly controversial by its insertion into the previous street plan of squares and terraces, which Lasdun claimed to respect though in a more Brutalist language. The expressed fire escape staircases make references to Wells Coates and Louis Kahn and Lasdun's masterplanning created a new semi-public square over car parking. The building is now listed Grade II*.

== Late work ==
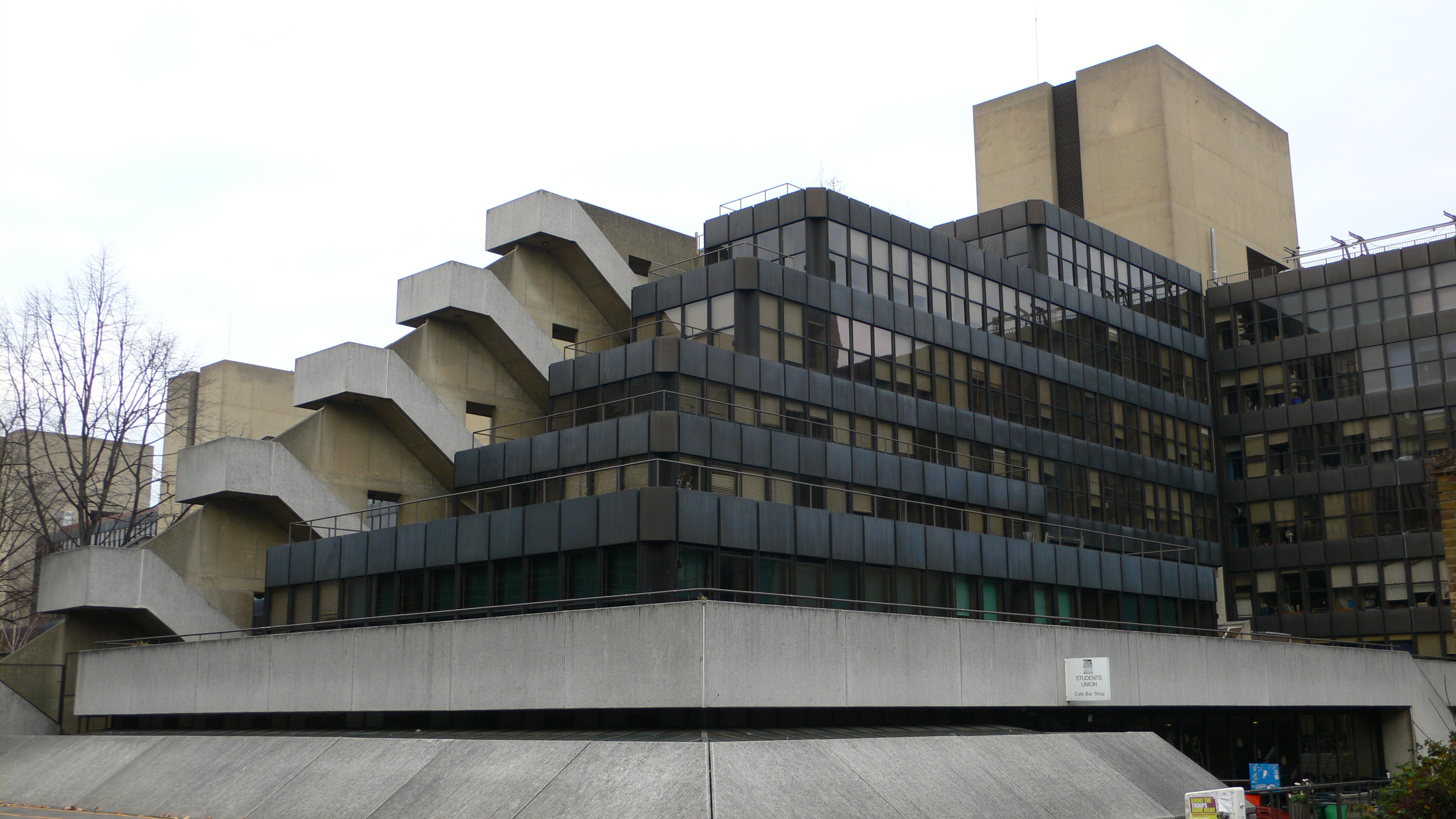
Institute of Education

The most celebrated of the architect's work is his Royal National Theatre on London's South Bank. King Charles compared it to a nuclear power station but it was popular with other traditionalists, with John Betjeman writing Lasdun a letter in praise of its design. Lasdun (or his firm Lasdun, Softley and Partners) designed the neighbouring IBM headquarters (finished 1985) as a low-rise setting for the theatre. His European Investment Bank in Luxembourg deployed a similar layered low-rise design approach. The last works produced by the firm were an office block, Milton Gate, Chiswell Street, London clad in green-tinted glazing and 10 Fenchurch Street, London clad in aluminium; Lasdun's design involvement with these was very slight.

Lasdun was awarded the RIBA Royal Gold Medal in 1977. His drawings and papers are available for consultation at the RIBA Drawings & Archives Collections. Despite the controversy of much of his work, most of Lasdun's surviving buildings are listed, although his 1958 Peter Robinson department store on London's Strand was demolished in the 1990s.

Lasdun died on 11 January 2001 aged 86.

National Life Stories conducted an oral history interview (C467/9) with Denys Lasdun in 1996-97 for its Architects Lives' collection held by the British Library.

== Personal life ==
Lasdun married Susan Bendit in 1954; they had two sons and a daughter. One is the author James Lasdun.

== Honours ==
Lasdun was appointed a Member of the Order of the British Empire (MBE) in June 1945, and promoted to Commander of the Order of the British Empire (CBE) in the 1965 New Year Honours. He was knighted in the 1976 Birthday Honours, and appointed a Member of the Order of the Companions of Honour (CH) in the 1995 Birthday Honours for services to architecture.

== Projects ==
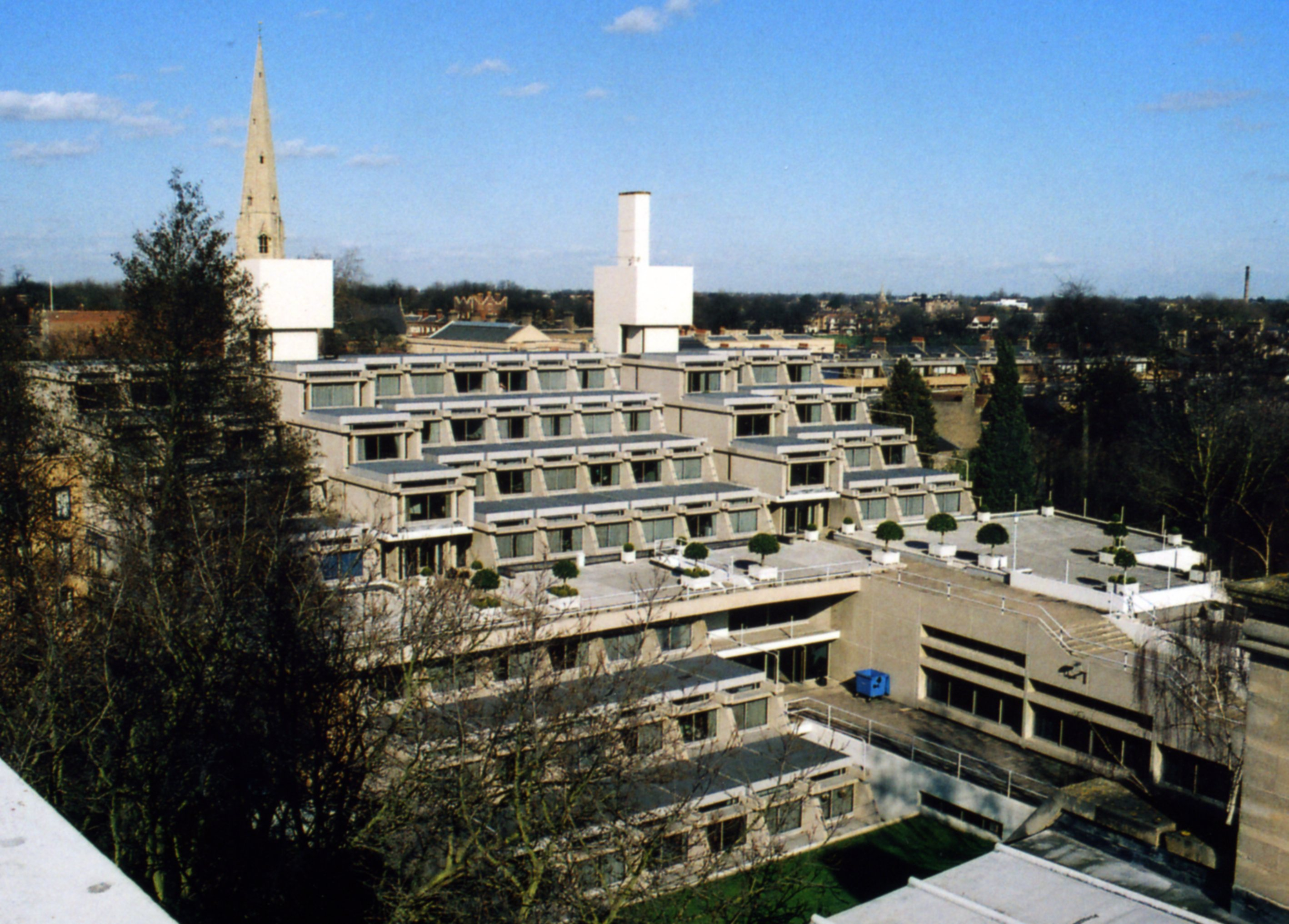
New Court, Christ's College, Cambridge (1966–70)

- House for Self, 32 Newton Road, London W2 (1938) listed Grade II
- Hallfield Primary School, Hallfield Estate, Paddington, London (1952), Grade II* listed
- Keeling House, Claredale House (Grade II* listed: the first example of post-war council housing to gain this distinction)
- Bradley House, Usk Street, a smaller variation of the Keeling House design, unlisted Bethnal Green (1957)
- Peter Robinson department store and offices over, Strand, London (1958) (demolished).
- Castlemaine House, London, (1959–60)
- 26 St James's Place, luxury residential, London, (1959–60)
- Fitzwilliam College, Cambridge (1959–63)
- Royal College of Physicians, London (1960–64) Grade I listed
- The core buildings of the University of East Anglia, Norwich (1962–68), including residential ziggurats, spine blocks, library etc.
- University Sports Centre, Oxford Road, Liverpool, England (1963)
- House for self - conversion, Rowan Rd, London.
- The Charles Wilson building at the University of Leicester
- The Lasdun Building, a residential block located in Stamford Hall, at the University of Leicester
- Institute of Advanced Legal Studies, Institute of Education, and the library of the School of Oriental and African Studies, Bloomsbury
- New Court, Christ's College, Cambridge (1966–70)
- Royal National Theatre, South Bank, London (1967–76) Grade II* listed
- The first phase of the European Investment Bank, Bvd. Konrad Adenauer, Luxembourg (1974–80)
- IBM Building, South Bank, London (1979–83)
