= Maxwell Fry =

English architect, writer and painter (1899–1987)

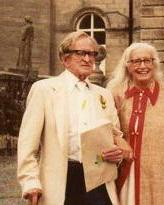
Maxwell Fry and his wife Jane Drew, in 1984, at Lartington Hall on the occasion of a dinner to celebrate his 85th birthday

Edwin Maxwell Fry, CBE, RA, FRIBA, FRTPI (2 August 1899 – 3 September 1987) was an English modernist architect, writer and painter.

Originally trained in the neo-classical style of architecture, Fry grew to favour the new modernist style, and practised with eminent colleagues including Walter Gropius, Le Corbusier and Pierre Jeanneret. Fry was a major influence on a generation of young architects. Among the younger colleagues with whom he worked was Denys Lasdun.

In the 1940s, Fry designed buildings for West African countries that were then part of the British Empire, including Ghana and Nigeria. In the 1950s, he and his wife, the architect Jane Drew, worked for three years with Le Corbusier on an ambitious development to create the new capital city of Punjab at Chandigarh.

Fry's works in Britain range from railway stations to private houses to large corporate headquarters. Among his best known works in the UK is the Kensal House flats in Ladbroke Grove, London, designed with Walter Gropius, which was aimed at providing high quality low cost housing, on which Fry and Gropius also collaborated with Elizabeth Denby to set new standards.

Fry's writings include critical and descriptive books on town planning and architecture, notably his Art in a Machine Age. His last book was the Autobiographical Sketches of his life from boyhood up to the time of his marriage to Jane Drew.

== Biography ==
=== Early years ===
Fry was born in Liscard, Cheshire (now Merseyside). He describes his father, Canadian-born Ambrose Fry, as a "business man with all sorts of irons in the fire – chemicals, electricals, old property..."; he mentions living in a terrace house converted by his father overlooking Liverpool Cathedral; and his first job was working in his father's factory, the Liverpool Borax Co. in Edge Street. His mother was Lydia (Lily) Thompson. He had two older sisters, Muriel and Nora, and a younger brother Sydney. To his family and friends he was known as Maxi or Max.

Fry was educated at the Liverpool Institute High School. He served in the King's Liverpool regiment at the end of the First World War. After the war he received an ex-serviceman's grant that enabled him to enter Liverpool University school of architecture in 1920, where he was trained in "the suave neo-Georgian classicism" of Professor Charles Reilly. The curriculum of the course included town planning as an important component, and Fry retained an interest in planning throughout his career. He gained his diploma with distinction in 1923. The next year he worked for a short time in New York before returning to England to join the office of Thomas Adams and F. Longstreth Thompson, specialists in town planning.

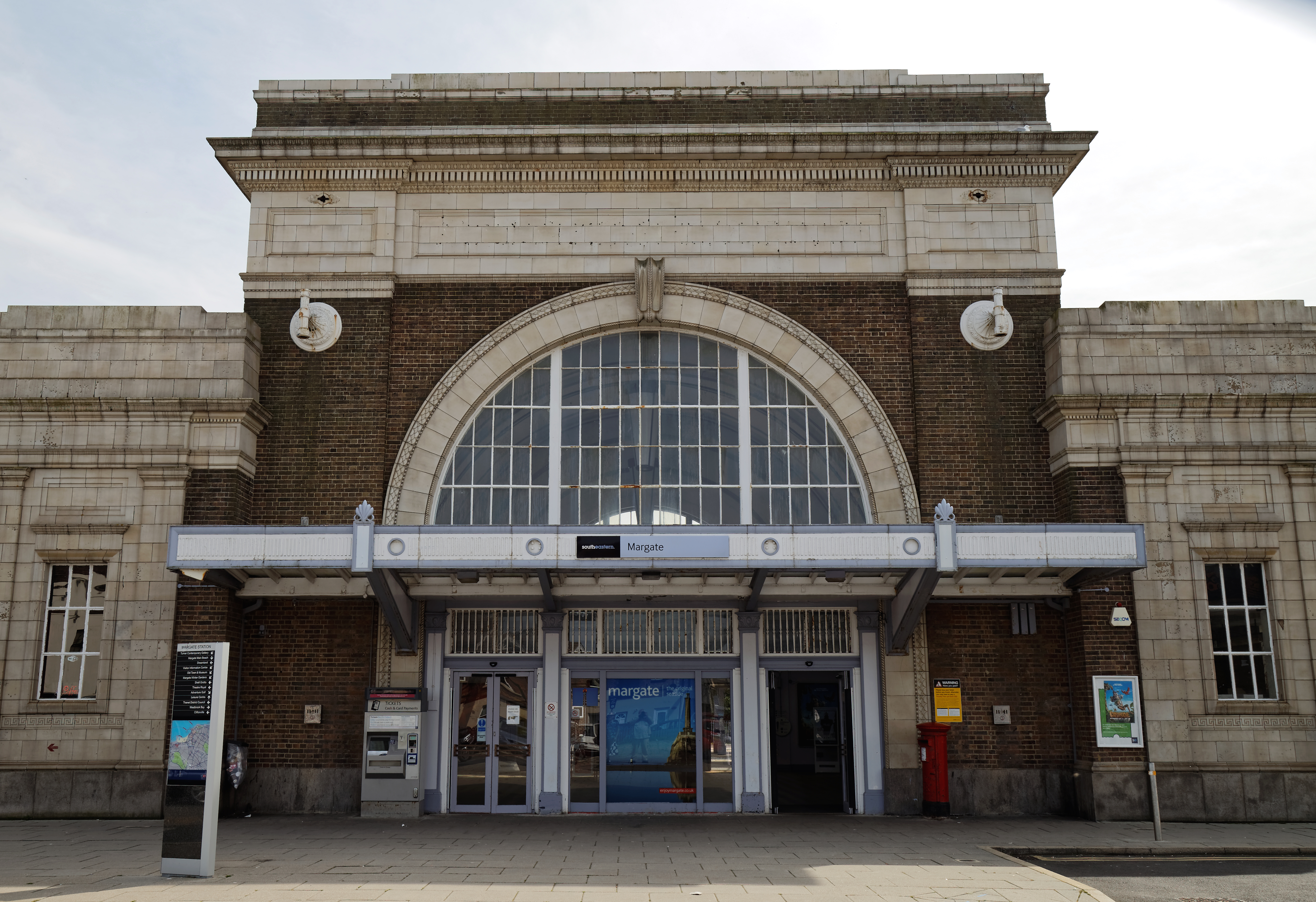
Margate railway station facade

His next post was as an assistant in the architect's department of the Southern Railway, where in 1924–1926 he worked on three neo-classically styled railway stations, at Margate, Ramsgate and Dumpton Park, the first two (both in Kent) being Grade II Listed.

In 1926, he married his first wife Ethel Leese (née Speakman). She was a divorcee, previously married to Lancashire cricketer Charles Leese (1889–1947), and aged 38 when they married. The marriage was not happy: Max described her as "a too well-bred wife without a frolic in her nature ... with the same determination [as her mother] to be well thought of without trying", and he also noted that she was a chain smoker. They had one daughter, Ann Fry.

He returned to Adams and Thompson in 1930 as a partner.

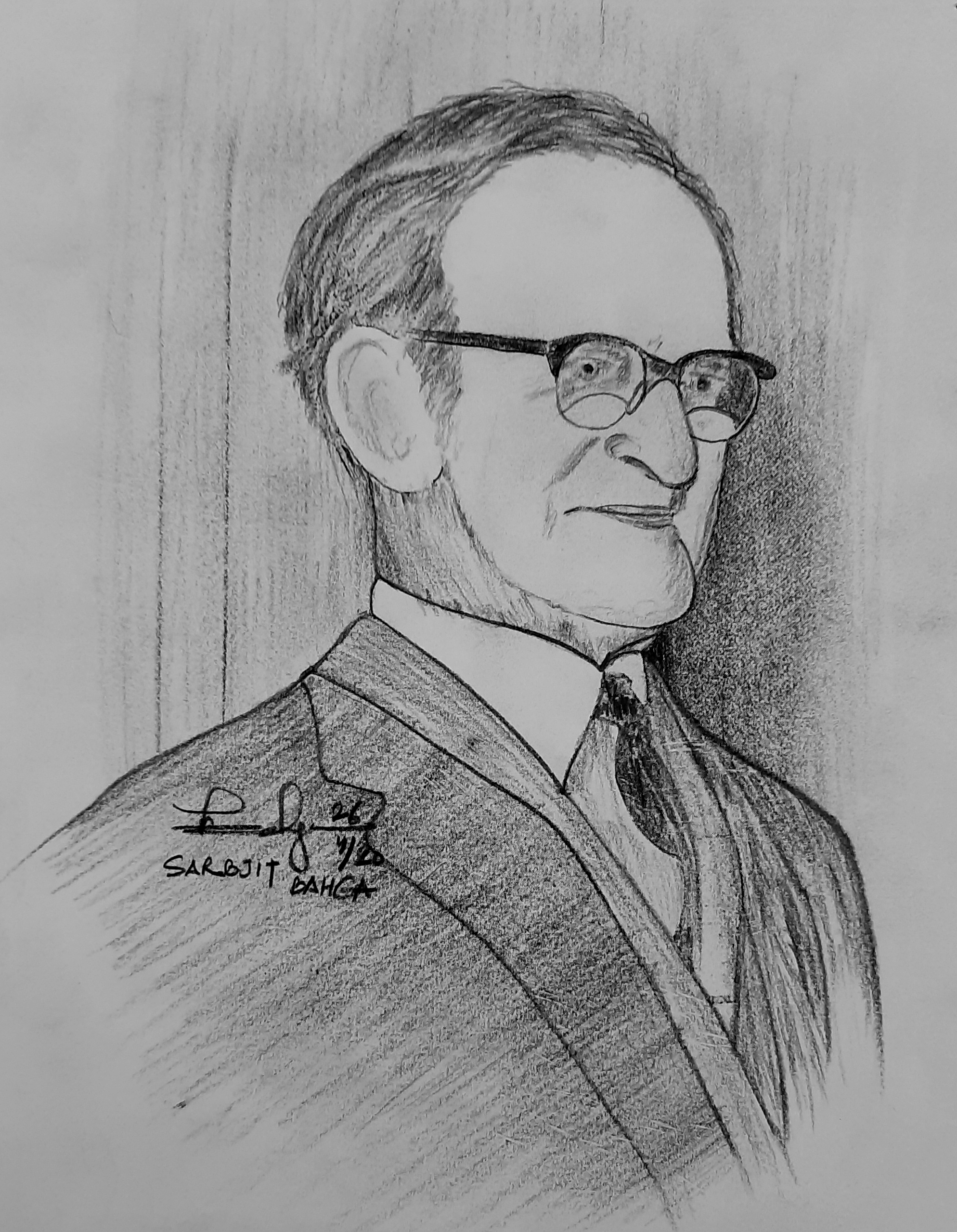
A pencil sketch of Maxwell Fry

=== Modernism ===
In a 2006 study of Fry in the Journal of the Society of Architectural Historians, R. W. Liscombe writes that Fry, frustrated at the prevailing conservatism of British architecture and society, renounced Reilly's neo-classicism in favour of "an independent functionalist design idiom modified from the main German and French progenitors of the modern movement". Liscombe adds that the "austere formalism and social idealism" of continental modernism appealed to Fry's moral outlook and his desire for social change. Fry's biographer Alan Powers writes that the change in Fry's aesthetic views came gradually; he continued to design in the neo-classical style for some years: "As a partner in Adams, Thompson and Fry, he designed a garden village at Kemsley near Sittingbourne in 1929, and a house at Wentworth, Surrey, in 1932, in the refined neo-Georgian style typical of the Liverpool school." Wells Coates, a colleague at Adams, Thompson and Fry tried to enthuse Fry with the example of Le Corbusier, but his conversion to modernism, in Powers's words, "came principally through his membership of the Design and Industries Association, which introduced him to modern German housing. ... [Fry] was also influenced by the Congrès Internationaux d'Architecture Moderne, and was closely involved in its English branch, the Modern Architectural Research (MARS) Group, following its establishment in 1933." Even after his espousal of modernism, Fry remained fond of neo-classical architecture, lending his support to a campaign to preserve Nash's Carlton House Terrace in the 1930s.

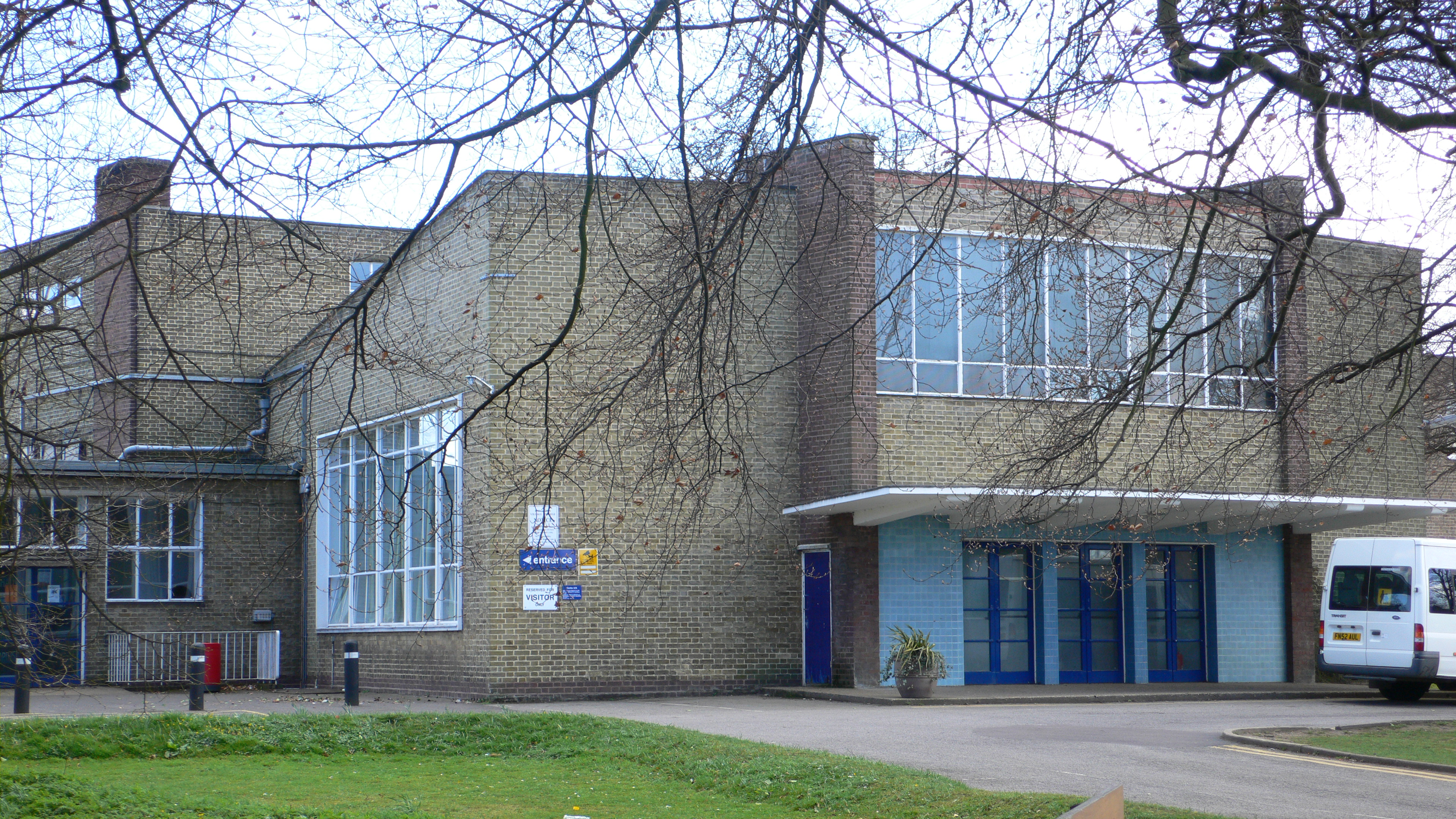
Impington Village College

Fry was one of the few modernist architects working in Britain in the thirties who were British; most were immigrants from continental Europe, where modernism originated. Among them was Walter Gropius, former director of the Bauhaus, who fled from Nazi Germany in 1934 and with whom Fry set up a practice in London in the same year. The partnership lasted until 1936, when Gropius, receiving offers of work from Harvard University, decided to emigrate to the US. Gropius wanted Fry to go with him, saying "your country will be at war", but though Fry agreed, he "could not face the prospect of being a refugee, however honourably accompanied". Among their joint works was Impington Village College, Cambridgeshire: Gropius created the original design, and Fry revised it and supervised construction after Gropius's departure.

Fry first met pioneering social reformer Elizabeth Denby in 1934, whom he described as "a small dynamic woman", at a party in Henry Moore's studio. Denby had a sponsor, Lady Mozelle Sassoon, for the flats – R. E. Sassoon House – they had designed as part of a working-class estate around the Pioneer Health Centre in Peckham, London. As pleasant social housing at minimum cost, Sassoon House became his first collaboration with Denby. He worked again with Denby to create Kensal House, in Ladbroke Grove, London, on a disused corner of land belonging to the Gas Light and Coke Company between the Grand Union Canal and the railway. The project was completed in 1937. Fry opportunistically planned the blocks of flats to curve in front of the site of a disused gasholder which then included a nursery school, and his simple design won the competition for this project. The result was a spacious estate for working-class people with modern shared amenities, which set new standards for its time. Fry admitted in his Autobiographical Sketches that during their work together his enthusiasm for their work on the project was for some time indistinguishable from his enthusiasm for her, distracted by the "sad inadequacies" of his own marriage: but he broke up the relationship because he admitted "... I failed publicly to acknowledge her and injured us both irreparably."

Among Fry's well-known buildings of the 1930s are the Sun House, Frognal Lane, Hampstead (1936), and Miramonte in New Malden, Kingston, Surrey (1937). His obituarist for The Times wrote of this period that "places in Fry's office were much sought after by the eager young men of the profession. Many who later distinguished themselves passed through it and have never forgotten Fry's early influence on them."

From 1937 to 1942, Fry worked as secretary, with Arthur Korn as chairman, on the governing committee of the MARS group plan for the redevelopment of postwar London, the results of which were outlined in his 1944 work Fine Building. The plan was described by Dennis Sharp, one of Fry's collaborators, as "frankly Utopian and Socialistic in concept."

In 1939, Fry became a fellow of the Royal Institute of British Architects.

During the Second World War, he served with the Royal Engineers, ending the war with the rank of major.

=== 1940s and postwar ===
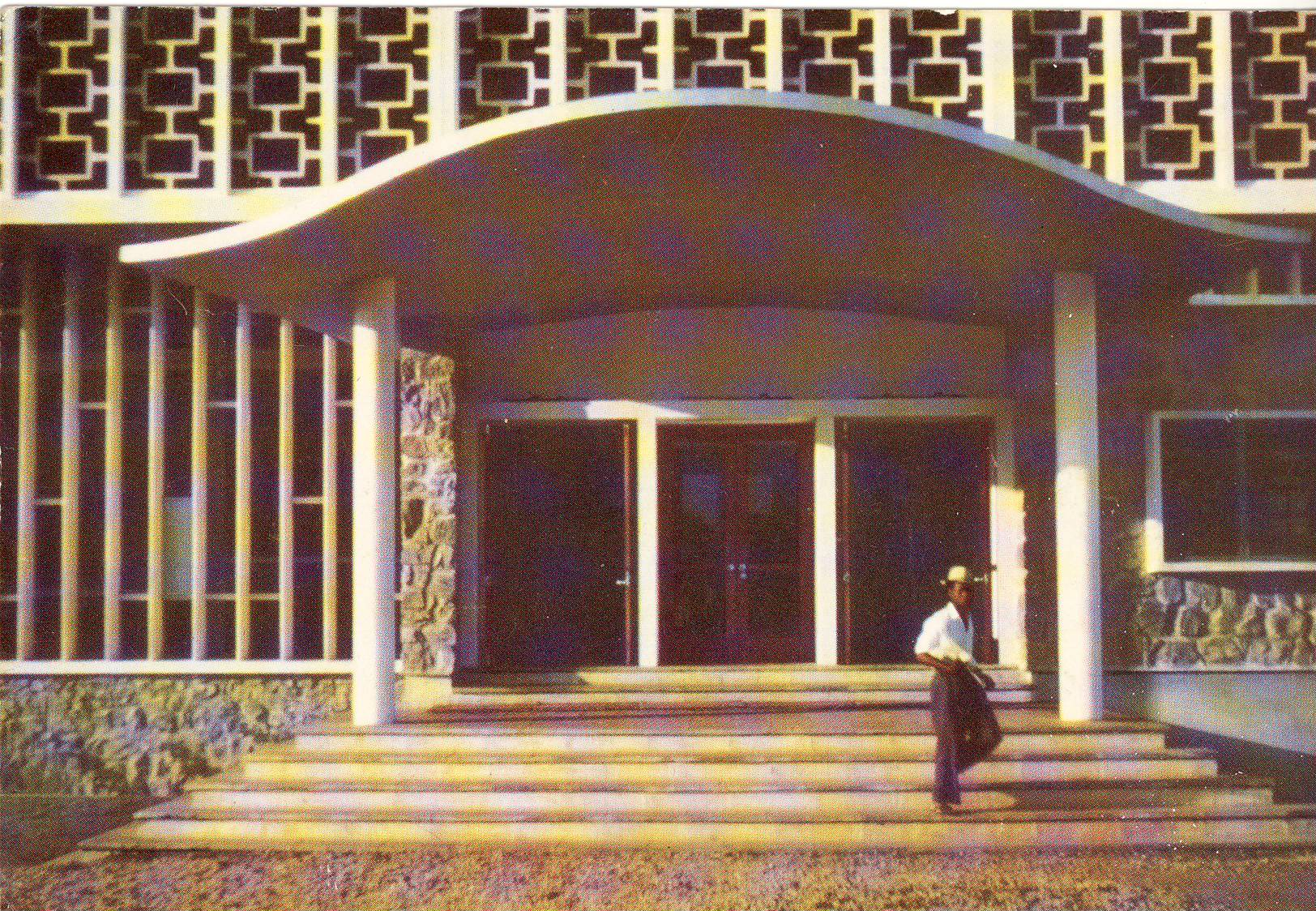
Kenneth Onwuka Dike Library, University of Ibadan (Nigeria)

In 1942, recently divorced from his first wife, Fry married the architect Jane Drew, whom he had met during his work on the MARS plan. She shared Fry's zeal for architectural and social modernisation, and they became professional as well as personal partners, establishing Fry, Drew and Partners, which existed from 1946 to 1973. Their first work together was for the British government in its West African colonies. In 1944, Fry was appointed town planning adviser to Lord Swinton, the resident minister of British West Africa; Drew was engaged as Fry's assistant. Their official postings continued until 1946, when Fry and Drew set up in private practice. Although based in London, most of their work for the next few years continued to be in west Africa for the British colonial authorities. The Frys opened an office in Ghana (then known as the Gold Coast) and worked there and in Nigeria, primarily on educational establishments, and often in temporary partnership with other British architects. The Times considered Fry's most notable work in West Africa to be the University of Ibadan.

In 1951, Fry and Drew joined an ambitious project to plan and create a new city, Chandigarh. With the partition of India, the Indian part of Punjab needed a new capital. Fry and his wife were responsible for securing Le Corbusier's participation in the project. He had previously declined invitations, but Fry and Drew visited him in Paris and secured his agreement to join them. He took on the designs of the new capital's major governmental and legal buildings and advised on the master plan for the city. Together with Pierre Jeanneret and a team of local architects, the Frys worked within Le Corbusier's plan to create Chandigarh; they spent three years there, designing housing, a hospital, colleges, a health centre, swimming pools and shops.

Both Fry and Drew often collaborated with and were close friends of Ove Arup, the founder of the engineering firm Arup. As Fry, Drew and Partners, the pair's major British commission was the headquarters of Pilkington Glass in St. Helens, Lancashire. The building includes a number of modernist art commissions with works by Victor Pasmore. Fry and Drew took on a number of younger partners, and the practice eventually grew to a considerable size. However, in the view of The Times's obituarist, "in these new circumstances his personal talent somehow became submerged, and the work of the firm that bore his name, though of acceptable quality, was not easy to distinguish from the competent modern work done by many other firms. Fry's originality, and his sparkle as a designer, were far less evident than in his pre-war buildings."

=== Later years ===
Fry was also a painter, writer and a poet. In the 1950s, he frequented the community of Surrealist artists gathered at the villa of William and Noma Copley in Longpont-sur-Orge in the outskirts of Paris. Fry and Drew had among their friends contemporary artists such as Henry Moore, Barbara Hepworth, Ben and Winifred Nicholson, Victor Pasmore and Eduardo Paolozzi; and the author Richard Hughes. Fry was elected ARA in 1966 and advanced to RA in 1972. He exhibited at the Royal Academy Summer Exhibition, had a one-man show in 1974 at the Drian Gallery in London, and continued painting in his retirement. He served on the council of the Royal Institute of British Architects, of which he was vice-president in 1961–2. He was awarded the institute's Royal Gold Medal in 1964. He also served on the Royal Fine Arts Commission and on the council of the Royal Society of Arts. He was appointed CBE in 1955, was elected a corresponding member of the Acádemie Flamande in 1956, and an honorary Fellow of the American Institute of Architects in 1963. He was an honorary LLD of Ibadan University, and towards the end of his life he became Professor of Architecture at the Royal Academy.

On his retirement in 1973, Fry and his wife moved from London to a cottage in Cotherstone, County Durham, where he died in 1987 at the age of 88.

== List of works ==
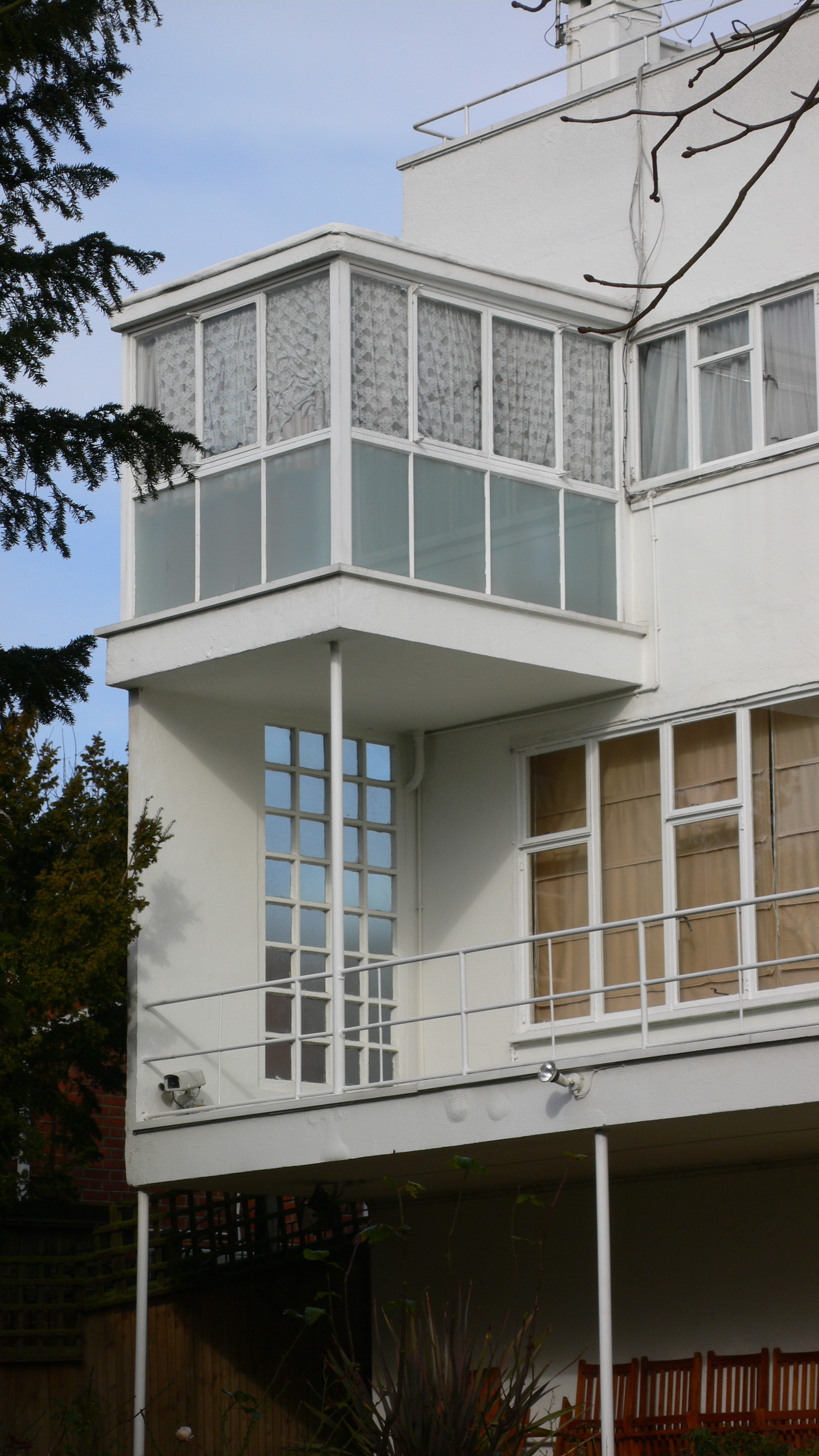
The Sun House, Hampstead, London

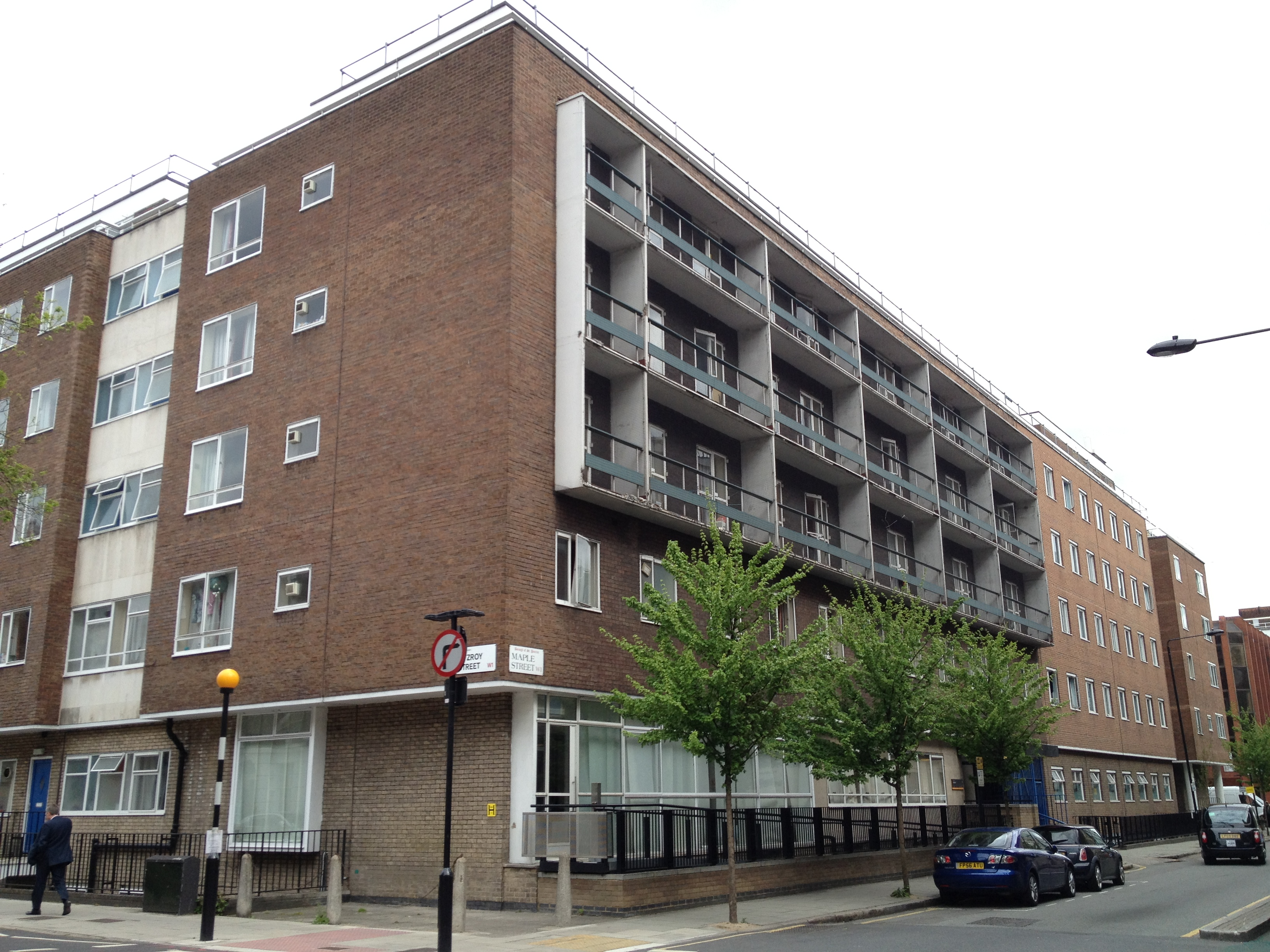
Ramsay Hall, London

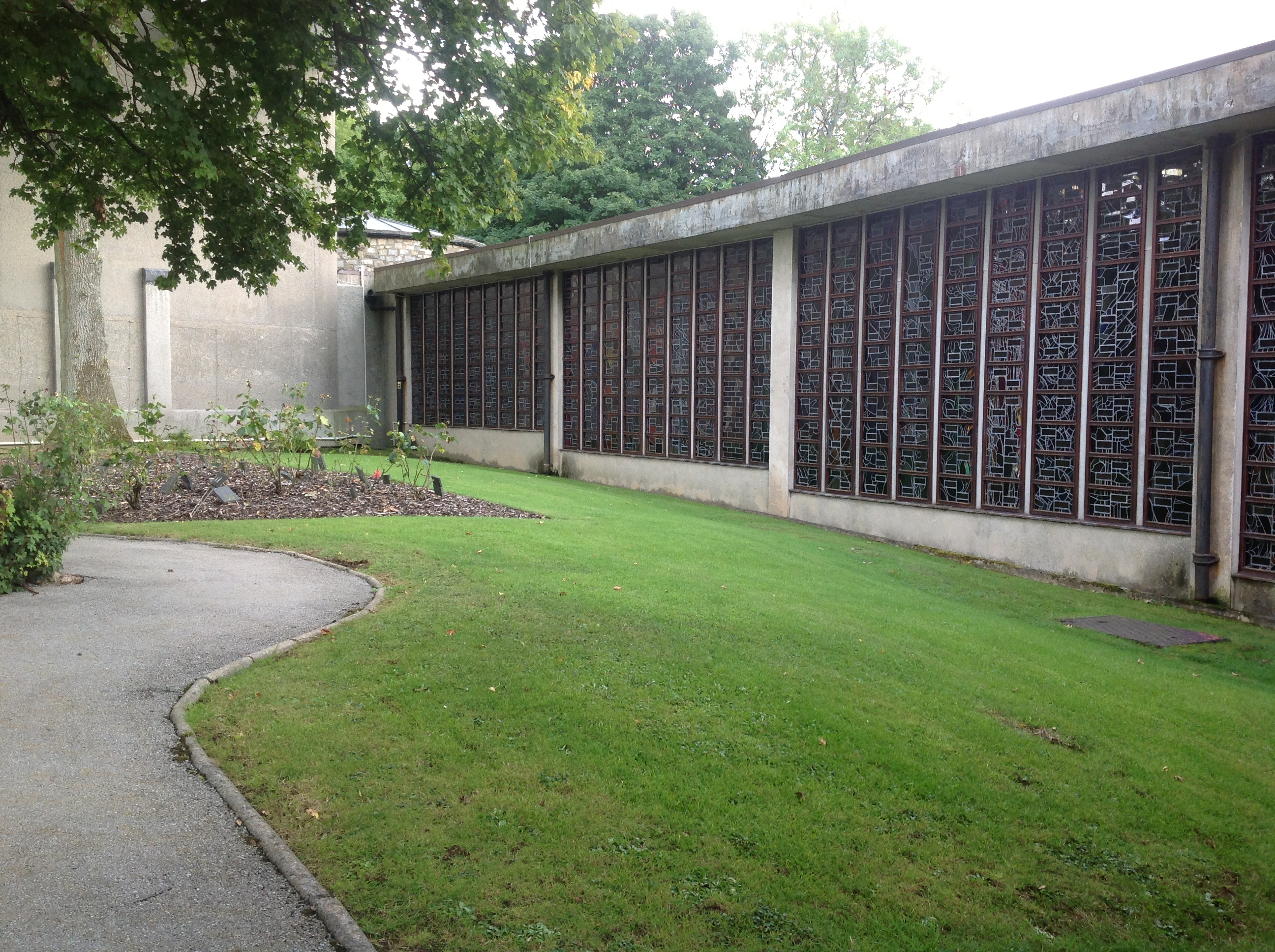
Capel Crallo, Coychurch Crematorium, Mid-Glamorgan

- 1923–40 many houses and flats including Ridge End at Wentworth, Surrey and Club House at Sittingbourne, Kent
- 1933–34 R. E. Sassoon House (workers' flats), St. Mary's Road, Peckham, South-East London, Fry's first building in reinforced concrete, in collaboration with Elizabeth Denby – Grade II Listed
- 1935 Flats on St. Leonard's Hill, Windsor (with Walter Gropius) – never built, owing to lack of funding.
- 1935 The Sun House, 9 Frognal Way, Frognal, Hampstead, London – Grade II* Listed
- 1936 Shop front to 115 Cannon Street, City of London (with Walter Gropius) – Grade II Listed
- 1936 Levy House, 66 Old Church Street, Chelsea, London (with Gropius) – Grade II Listed
- 1936 Little Winch, House at Chipperfield Common, Hertfordshire – Grade II* Listed
- 1936 Miramonte, house in Coombe, New Malden, Kingston, Surrey – Grade II Listed
- 1937 Kensal House, Ladbroke Grove, Kensington, London, in collaboration with Elizabeth Denby – Grade II* Listed
- 1938 Showrooms for Central London Electricity, Regent Street, London
- 1938 Flats at 65 Ladbroke Grove, London – Grade II Listed
- 1939 Impington Village College, Cambridge (with Gropius) – Grade I Listed
- 1949–60 University of Ibadan, Nigeria
- 1950 St. Francis College, Ho Hoe, Togoland
- 1951 Work for the Festival of Britain
- 1951 Adisadel College, Ghana
- 1951–54 Housing in Chandigarh, India
- 1951–54 Ramsay Hall, London
- 1952 Passfield House and other flats in Lewisham, south-east London
- 1953 School at Mawuli, Ghana
- 1954 School and College at Aburi, Ghana
- 1955–58 Design of the Usk Street Housing Estate at Bethnal Green, London (with Denys Lasdun) – Grade II Listed
- 1956 Co-operative Bank at Ibadan, Nigeria
- 1958 Teacher Training College in Wudil, Nigeria
- 1958 Oriental Insurance Building, Calcutta, India
- 1959 Schools in Lagos, Nigeria
- 1960 Pilkington Bros. (Glass), office and social housing, St. Helens, Lancashire
- 1960 BP office in Lagos, Nigeria
- 1960 Office building for Dow Agrochemicals Ltd., King's Lynn, Norfolk
- 1965-7, Kingston House, Kingston upon Hull
- 1970 Crematorium at Coychurch, Mid-Glamorgan

== Bibliography ==
=== Books ===
- (with Thomas Adams, Francis Longstreth Thompson and James W. R. Adams) Recent Advances in Town Planning. London: J. & A. Churchill, 1932. OCLC 4377060
- Fine Building. London: Faber & Faber, 1944. OCLC 1984391
- (with Jane Drew) Architecture for Children. London: George Allen and Unwin, 1944. OCLC 559791804 (Republished 1976 as Architecture and the Environment)
- (with Jane Drew and Harry L. Ford) Village Housing in the Tropics: with special reference to West Africa. London: Lund Humphries, 1947. OCLC 53579274
- (with Jane Drew) Tropical Architecture in the Humid Zone. London: Batsford, 1956. OCLC 718056727
- (with Jane Drew) Tropical Architecture in the Dry and Humid Zones. London: Batsford, 1964. OCLC 155707318
- Art in a Machine Age: A Critique of Contemporary Life through the Medium of Architecture. London: Methuen, 1969. ISBN 0-416-04080-2
- Tapestry and Architecture: An Address Given at the Opening of an Exhibition of Tapestries by Miriam Sacks at the Ben Uri Gallery 22 October 1969. London: Keepsake P., 1970. ISBN 0-901924-09-1
- Autobiographical Sketches, London: Elek, 1975. ISBN 0-236-40010-X
- (with Jane Drew) Architecture and the Environment, London: George Allen and Unwin, 1976. ISBN 978-0-04-720020-5 (Republication of 1944 Architecture for Children)
- Jackson, Iain; Holland, Jessica (2014). The architecture of Edwin Maxwell Fry and Jane Drew. Farnham, Surrey: Ashgate Publishing Limited. ISBN 978-1-4094-5198-3.

=== Articles ===
- "African experiment – building for an educational programme in the Gold Coast". London: The Architectural Review, No. 677 Vol. CXIII, May 1953, pp. 299–310. OCLC 638313897
- (with Jane Drew) "Chandigarh and Planning Development in India." I. The Plan, by E. Maxwell Fry, II. Housing, by Jane B. Drew. London: Journal of the Royal Society of Arts, No.4948, 1 April 1955, Vol.CIII, pp. 315–333. OCLC 34739832
