= Institute of Education building =

Coordinates: 51.5232°N 0.1281°W

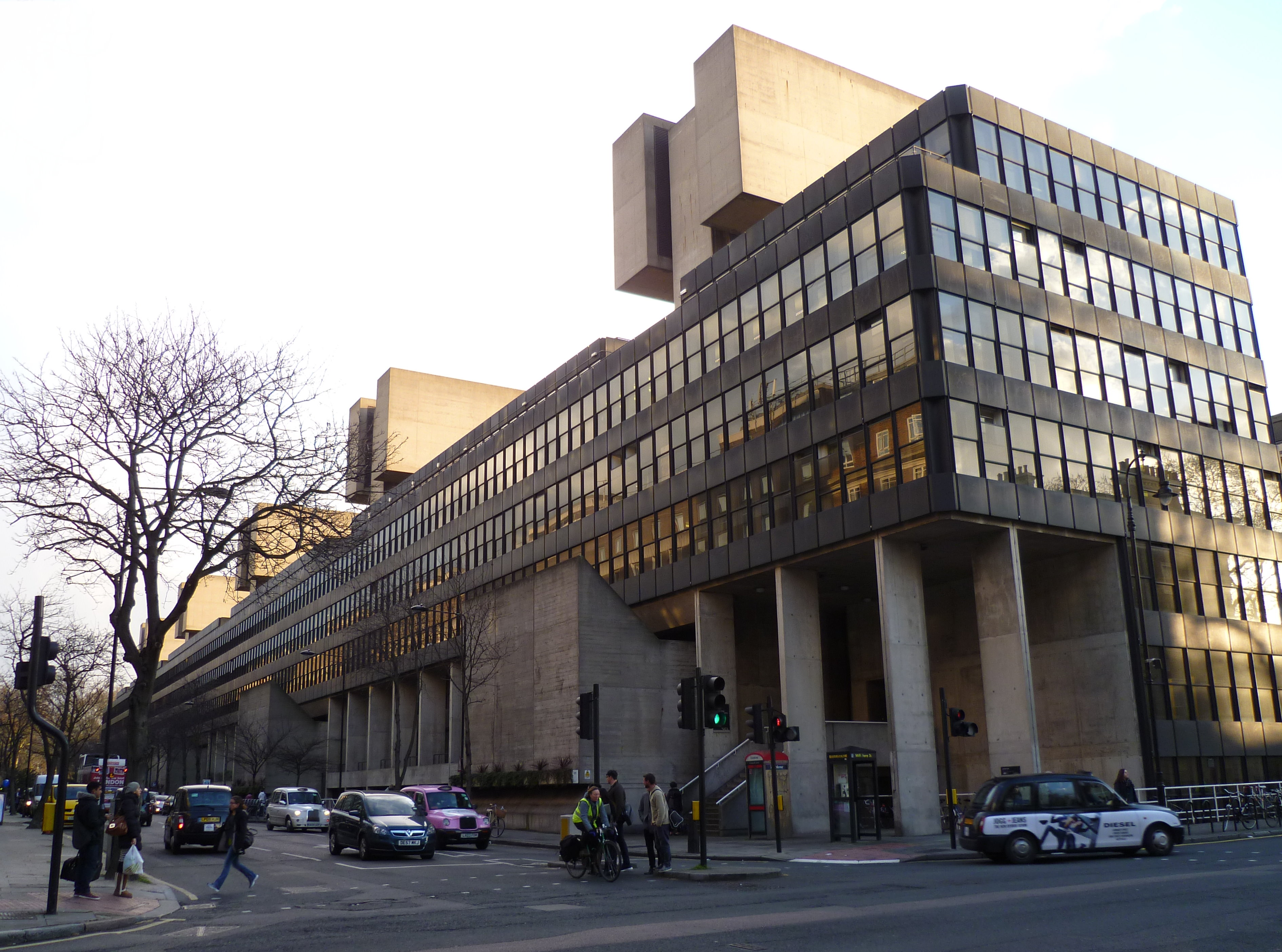
The Institute of Education building from Bedford Way

The Institute of Education building is a Grade II* listed building by Denys Lasdun and Partners in the London Borough of Camden used by the University College London Institute of Education.

== Gallery ==
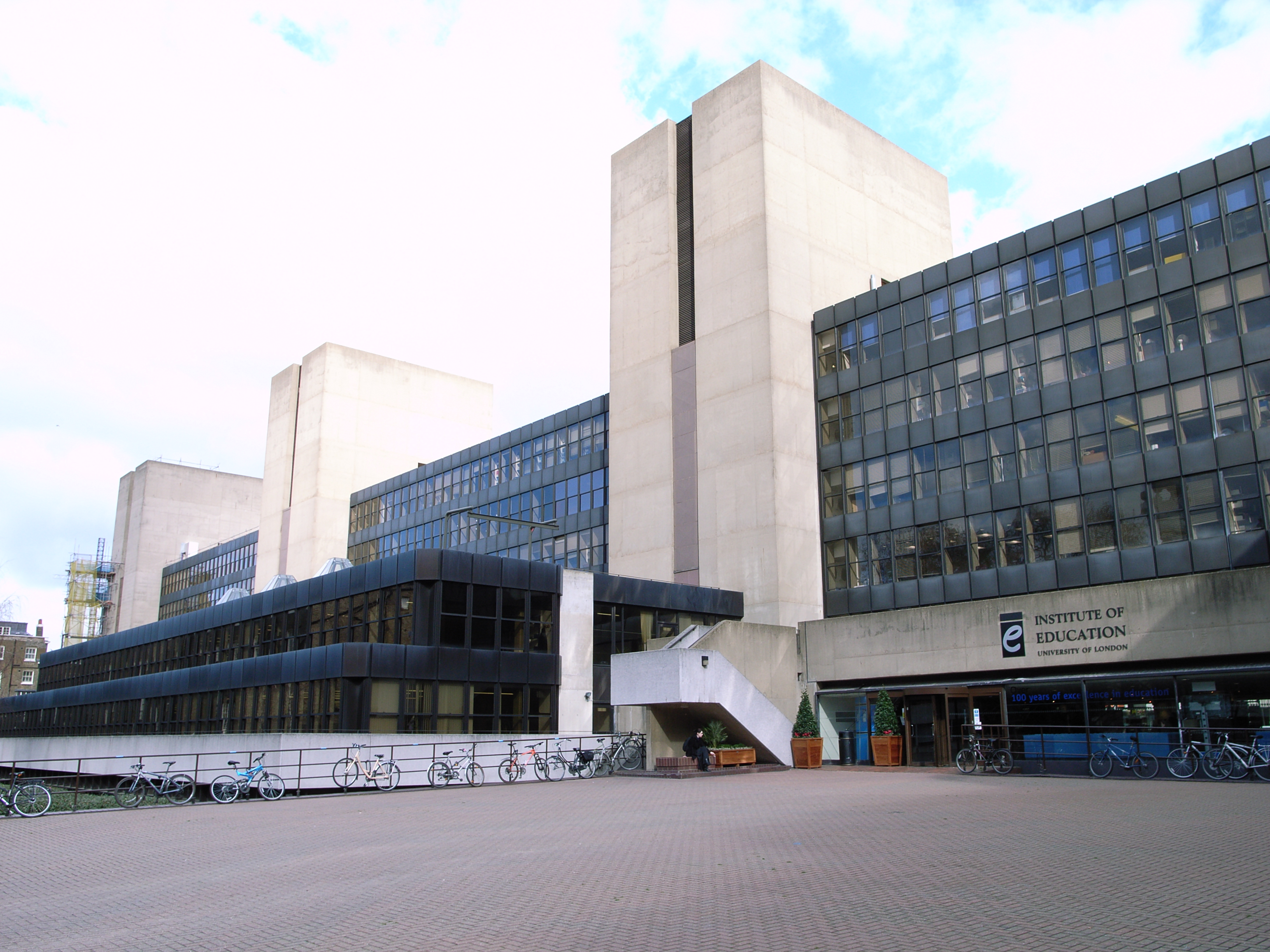
Rear view

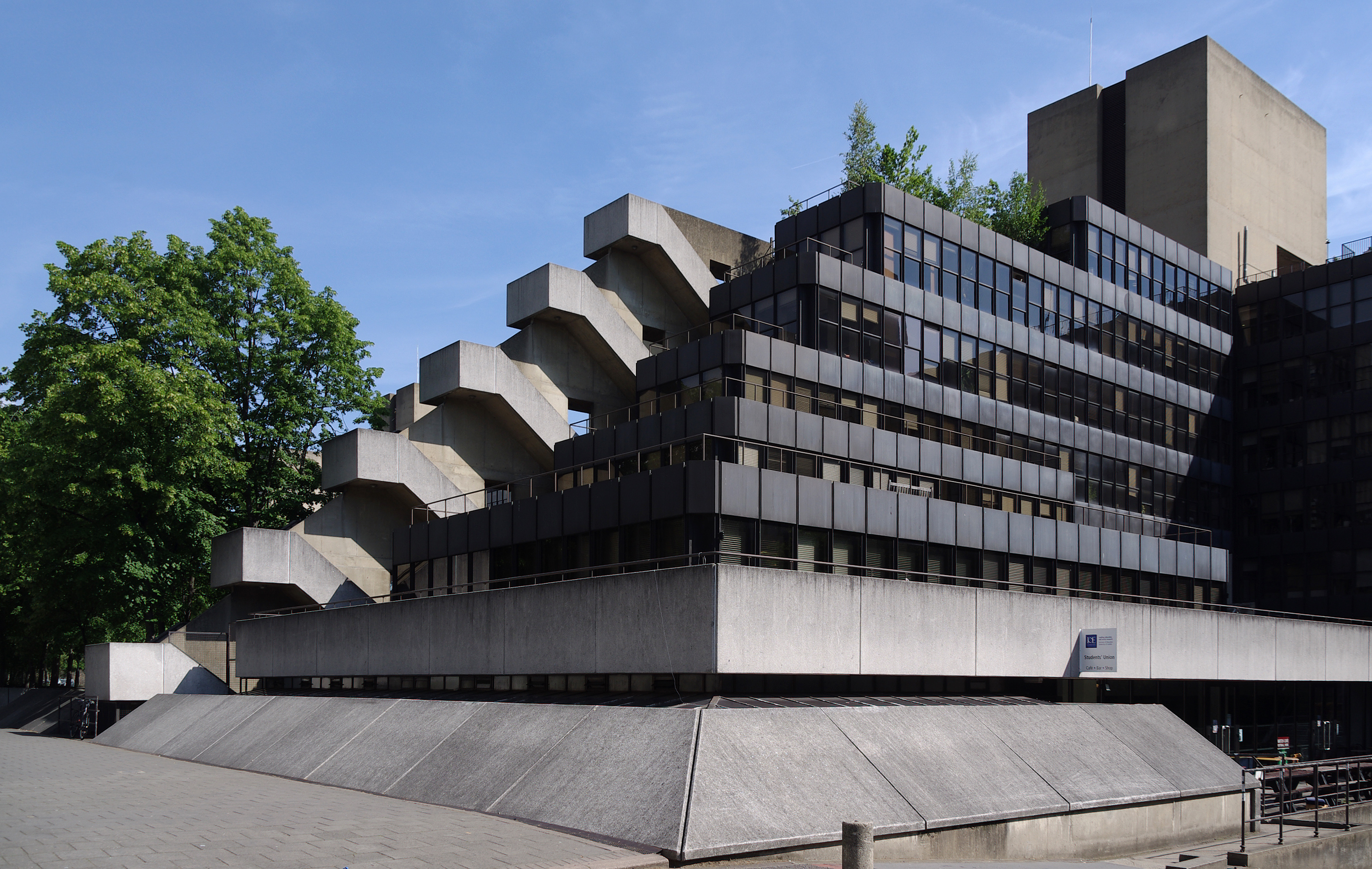
Rear view

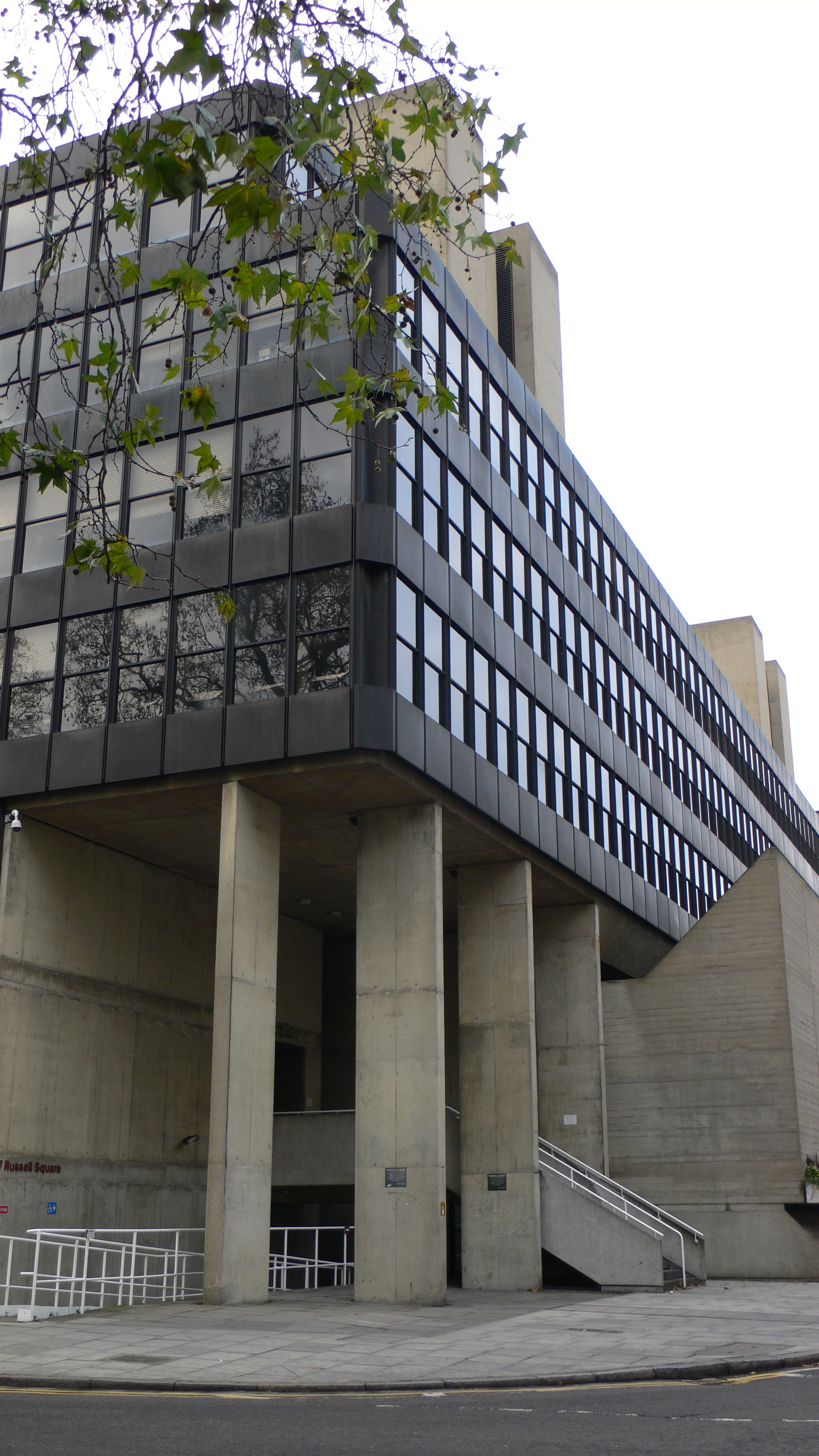
View from Russell Square

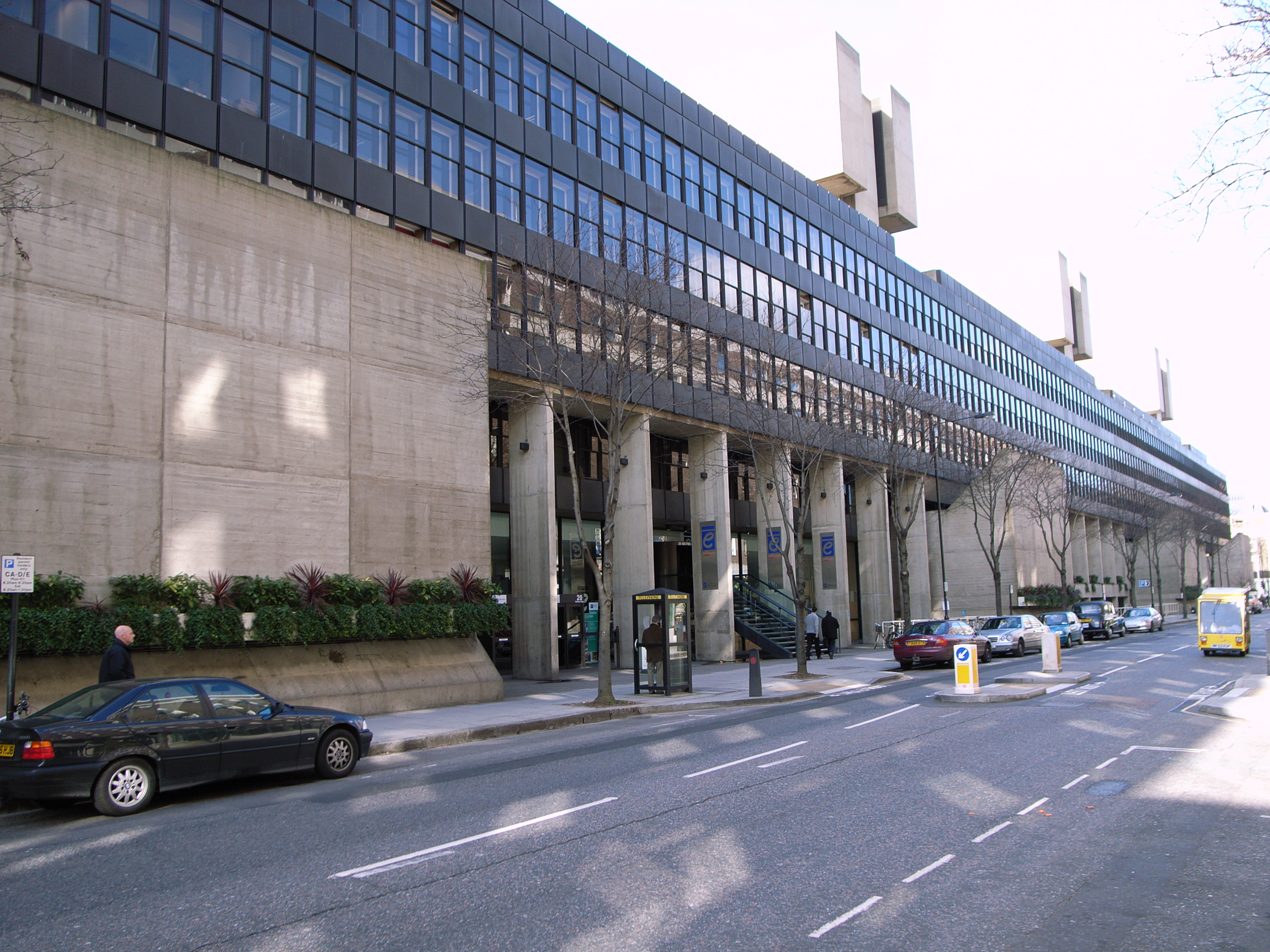
Entrance on Bedford Way

== See also ==
- List of Brutalist structures
