= Elizabeth Denby =

English social housing expert and consultant

Elizabeth Denby (1894 – 3 November 1965) was an English social housing expert and consultant.

== Biography ==
Denby was from Bradford, Yorkshire, the daughter of a doctor. She went to Bradford Girls Grammar School and then studied at the London School of Economics.

In 1931 Denby was the organising chair of the first "New Homes for Old" exhibit held at Methodist Central Hall (and subsequently as part of the biennial Building Trades Exhibition at Olympia between 1932 and 1938). In 1934/35 she held a Leverhulme Research Fellowship into low cost housing in Europe. In 1936 she addressed a sessional meeting of the Royal Institute of British Architects (RIBA) on her paper on 'Rehousing from the Slum Dweller's point of view', becoming the first women to do so.

After travelling around Europe she published a book entitled "Europe Rehoused". She set herself up as a housing consultant, based in West London. She was a member of the Board of Trade Committee for 7 years and became an honorary member of the RIBA.

During World War II, she argued for new methods to make cheap but attractive furniture, for example making tables with one central pillar rather than four legs.

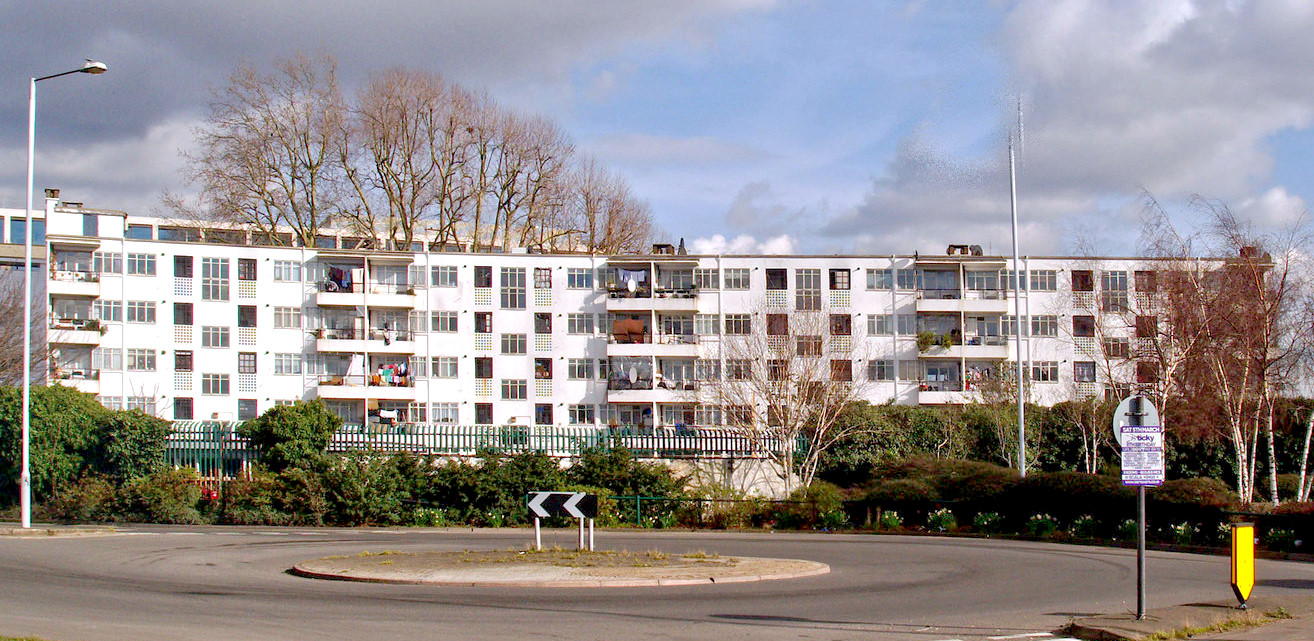
Kensal House

Denby focused on constructing affordable homes which reflected working class needs. Several prominent architects worked with her. Notably Maxwell Fry collaborated with her with his essays on the Modern Movement style: the scheme for low rental flats, Sassoon House in Peckham, which was completed in 1934, and the later Kensal House (1937) which was commissioned by the Gas, Light and Coke Company. Denby and Fry collaborated on this project for four years, but in 1937, Denby's name was omitted from the credit list for both schemes in two major publications. She is credited with prompting Fry to adopt a more progressive style. Denby's work to create more affordable living for the working class eventually resulted in houses that appeared cheap and unrealistic.

Denby demonstrated her interest in social housing during World War II when she lived in London. In May 1942 she organised with Noel Carrington an exhibition "Living in Houses" in London, a sequel to the successful exhibition "Living in Cities" held the previous year, showing solutions to the problem of providing, after the War, new houses "suitable and convenient for the ordinary man and his wife and children". On 27 March 1943 Denby gave a talk in the National Gallery on "The homes we want".

== Bibliography ==
- Europe Re-Housed, with a Foreword by The Rt. Hon. The Lord Horder, London, George Allen & Unwin, 1st ed. 1938
- Europe Re-Housed - Re-building Europe after World War Two, London, George Allen & Unwin, 2nd ed. 1944
