= Keeling House =

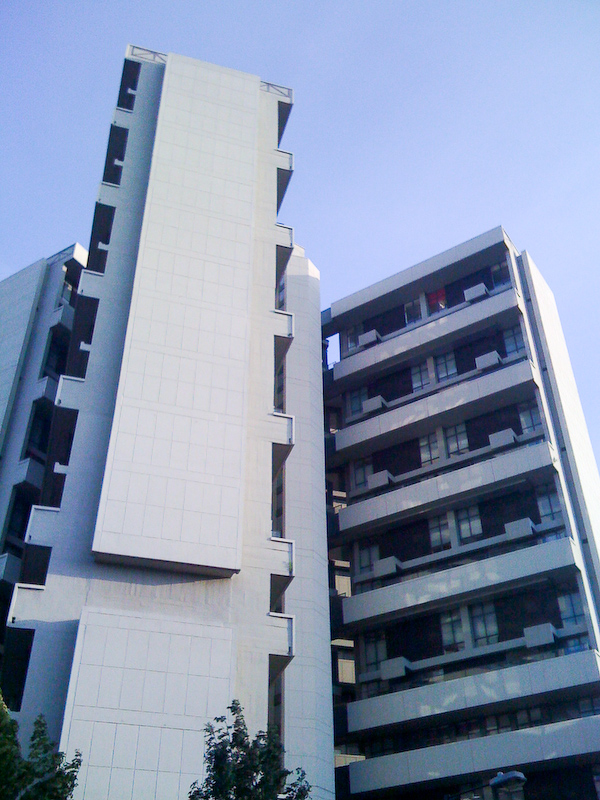
- Keeling House in 2008

General information
- Type: Residential maisonettes
- Location: London, E2; United Kingdom
- Coordinates: 51.53093°N 0.061079°W
- Construction started: 1954
- Completed: 1955

Height
- Roof: 43 metres (141 ft)

Technical details
- Floor count: 16

Design and construction
- Architect: Denys Lasdun

Keeling House is a 16-storey block of flats located on Claredale Street in Bethnal Green, London, England. It was designed by Denys Lasdun and completed in 1957 as a cluster of four blocks of maisonettes arranged around a central service tower. A radical renovation in 2001 added a penthouse storey and concierge service.

== History ==
Keeling House was originally part of a larger public housing scheme that also contained a low-rise council block called Bradley House. The building was erected following the completion of Lasdun's two smaller buildings on Usk Street, Bethnal Green, with which it shares its 'cluster' design. These were all council homes.

Lasdun was concerned that earlier modernist designs did not take sufficient account of what made neighbourhoods work. He sought to give residents a sense of place and belonging, replicating the good relations between neighbours which he noticed in traditional Victorian terraced streets. Each dwelling was a maisonette rather than a flat, similar inside to an East End house. Unlike a flat slab or tower block, he designed Keeling House with four wings that each look onto another, encouraging contact between neighbours. Between the central lift tower and the front doors of the apartments, tenants had to pass communal 'drying areas' for laundry and storage, where he hoped that social interchange would be as natural as in the streets below. However, he also designed the homes for privacy; the balconies face outward and do not look onto one another.

Keeling House was initially popular with residents. However, it later suffered from the social problems that affected many council estates in the 1970s and 1980s. Tower Hamlets Council closed the block in 1992, due to fears over the original construction quality.

In 1993, the building was designated a Grade II* listed building. This was the second example of post-war council housing being granted a listing, closely after Neave Brown's Alexandra road estate. Tower Hamlets could not afford to renovate it and in 1999 sold it to a private developer. It was converted into luxury apartments between 1999 and 2001. Key features of the renovation include a striking glass foyer with external water feature designed by local architects Munkenbeck and Marshall, and eight penthouses on what had previously been the service roof of a 15-storey building. Lasdun, who died in 2001, visited the project and supported the plans including the addition of penthouse flats, but regretted that the building would no longer house the poor. The redevelopment won an RIBA Award in 2002 and a Civic Trust commendation.

Bradley House, however, was demolished in 2005. Its site was redeveloped by Tower Hamlets Community Homes, a housing association, and Hill Partnerships as part of a mixed-tenure development opened in 2009.
