= Kensal House =

Housing estate in London

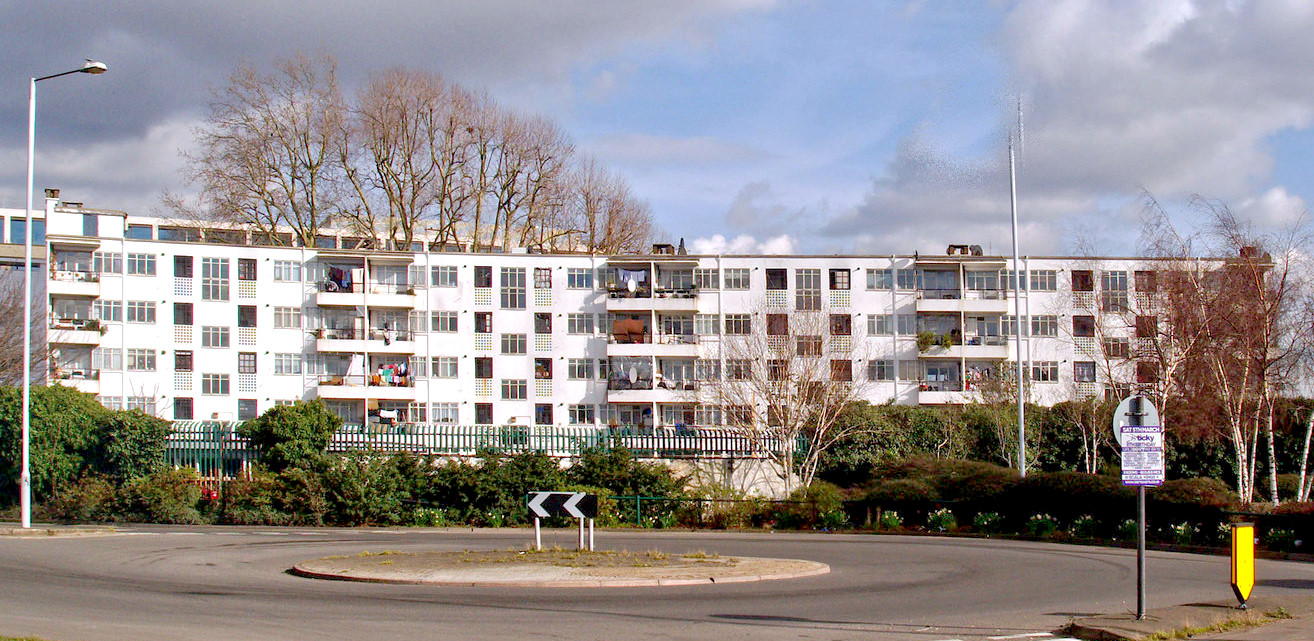
- Kensal House in 2016
- Interactive map of the Kensal House area

General information
- Type: Housing association flats
- Architectural style: Modernist
- Location: Ladbroke Grove, London, England, 1-68, Ladbroke Grove W10
- Coordinates: 51.5253°N 0.2151°W
- Completed: 1937
- Client: Gas Light and Coke Company

Design and construction
- Architect: Maxwell Fry
- Awards and prizes: Royal Gold Medal (1963)

Listed Building – Grade II*
- Official name: Kensal House
- Designated: 19 March 1981
- Reference no.: 1225244

Kensal House is a housing estate of two curved blocks of 68 housing association flats at the northern end of Ladbroke Grove, Kensal Green, completed in 1937 and designed by the architect Maxwell Fry. It was the first modernist block in the UK designed to be occupied by the working class and on completion in 1937, was widely thought to be a prototype for modern living.

== History ==
=== Design ===
The building was commissioned and financed by the Gas Light and Coke Company (GLCC) to provide 68 "working-class flats", housing 380 people. It was the first modernist block in the UK designed for this purpose. The project included a community centre, communal laundry, canteen and a nursery school. The development was unusual in that there was no electricity provided, rather gas fires, coke fires, gas cookers, gas water heaters, and gas-powered irons.

The project was designed by Maxwell Fry, but was developed by a committee of five architects and the social reformer Elizabeth Denby, who had worked with Fry at the Peckham Pioneer Health Centre. The GLCC wanted to show that a modern building could be run cheaply and powered safely by gas. Fry wanted to create what he called an urban village, and he and Denby wanted to offer working people "healthier, happier, safer, and more fulfilling lives". According to the Open University, "Kensal House marks the point in the story of British Modernist architecture when the social/political ideals of the early modernists come to the fore." On completion in 1937 it was widely thought to be a prototype for modern living.

=== Subsequent History ===
In 1942 a GLCC survey found tenants complaining about 'damp ‘oozing out of the walls’' and 'the small size of the kitchens'.

By the early 1950s the property was no longer considered a showpiece by the GLCC and so in 1951 was handed over to the London County Council. The LCC did not run the property as Denby and Fry had envisoned, such that it was in a poor state by the time it was passed to Kensington and Chelsea Council in 1965. By 1990 it could be described as 'a ghetto' and 'a textbook example of a degraded environment'.

In 2005 a £600,000 refurbishment was completed, which saw the reopening of the nursey. Nonetheless, in 2018 residents were still complaining about the room sizes and lack of double-glazing and by 2023 the property was 'being decimated by floods and sewage leaks' and beset with damp and mould. The issue is difficult to fix because Fry design the building such that the water pipes were embedded in the concrete floor, making them hard to access, while listed building status makes alterations legally difficult.

== Depictions ==
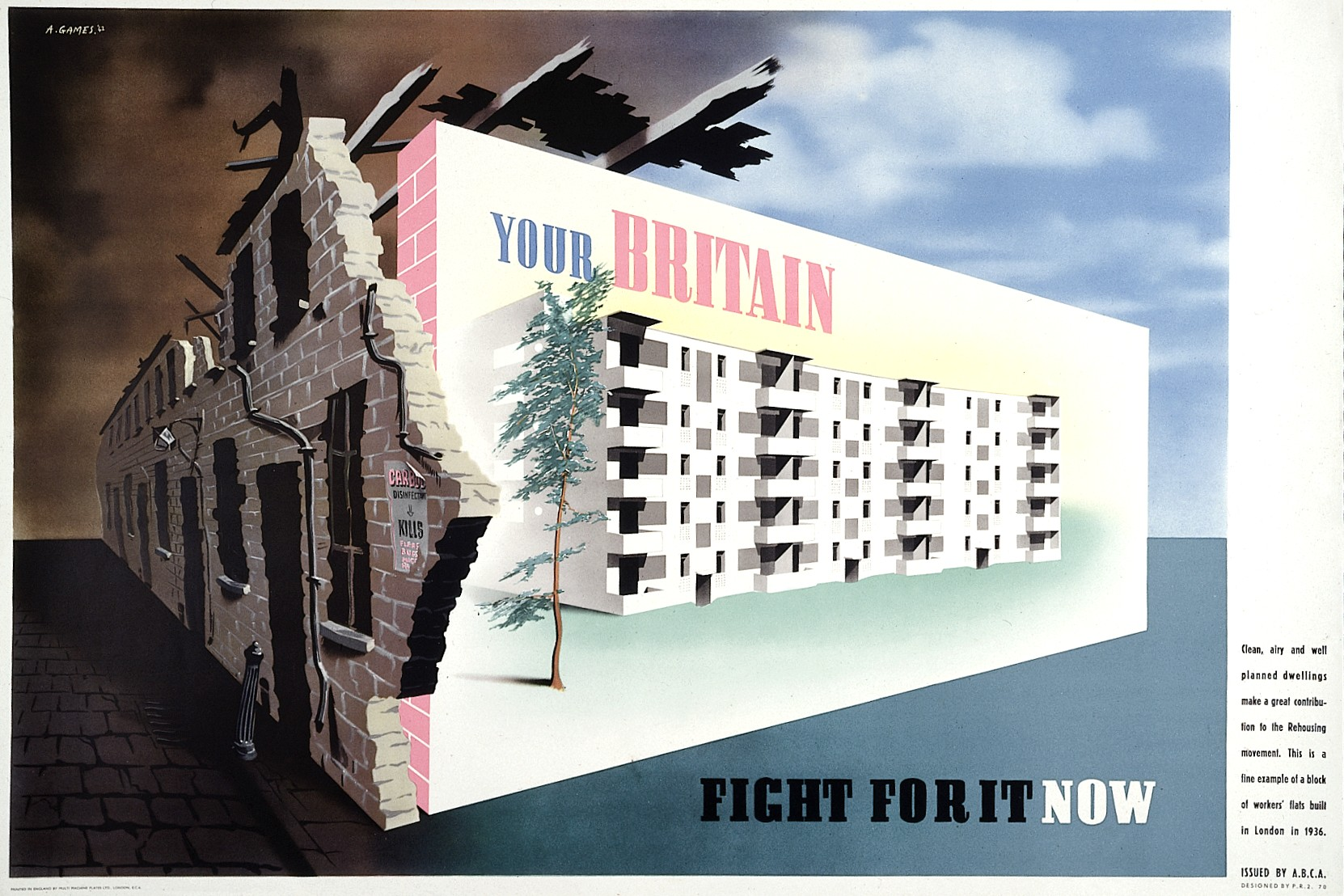
Kensal House on a 1942 Abram Games poster for the Army Bureau of Current Affairs

In 1937, the estate was the subject of an 11-minute documentary, Welcome to Kensal House, produced by the British Commercial Gas Association. In 1940, Kensal House provided the cover image for James Maude Richards's An Introduction to Modern Architecture, published by Penguin Books.

In 1942, Kensal House was featured prominently on a lithograph poster "Your Britain. Fight for It Now", designed by Abram Games, his second poster for the Army Bureau of Current Affairs. The poster contrasts derelict slum housing with the clean, white and modern aesthetic of Kensal House. Further wording on the poster reads: "Clean, airy and well planned dwellings make a great contribution to the Rehousing movement. This is a fine example of a block of workers' flats built in London in 1936."

In 1984, a 55-minute documentary, Twelve Views of Kensal House, was filmed on the property by Peter Wyeth. The film called attention to tenants who occupied the building since 1936. It featured Maxwell Fry, Stephen Bayley and Michael C. Burgess.

== Recognition ==
Kensal House was a RIBA Royal Gold Medal winner in 1963. As of 1981 it is Grade II* listed with Historic England, as is the associated Kensal House Day Nursery.
