= Jane Drew =

British architect and town planner (1911–1996)

Dame Jane Drew DBE FRIBA
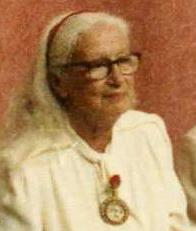
- Drew in 1984
- Born: 24 March 1911
- Died: 27 July 1996 (aged 85)
- Education: Architectural Association
- Occupations: Architect, town planner

Dame Jane Drew (24 March 1911 – 27 July 1996) was an English modernist architect and town planner. She qualified at the Architectural Association School in London, and prior to World War II became one of the leading exponents of the Modern Movement in London.

At the time Drew had her first office, with the idea of employing only female architects, architecture was a male dominated profession. She was active during and after World War II, designing social and public housing in England, West Africa, India and Iran. With her second husband, Maxwell Fry, she worked in West Africa designing schools and universities. She, Fry and Pierre Jeanneret, designed the housing at Chandigarh, the new capital of the Punjab. She designed buildings in Ghana, Nigeria, Iran and Sri Lanka, and she wrote books on what she had learnt about architecture there. In London she did social housing, buildings for the Festival of Britain, and helped to establish the Institute of Contemporary Arts. After retiring from practice, she travelled and lectured abroad, receiving several honorary degrees. She was awarded the DBE in the 1996 New Year Honours, gazetted 30 December 1995, only seven months before her death.

== Life ==
=== Early life (1911–1928) ===
Drew was born as Iris Estelle Radcliffe Drew in Thornton Heath, Croydon (then part of Surrey), but her name was registered a few days later as Joyce Beverly Drew. Her father, Harry Guy Radcliffe Drew (grandson of Joseph Drew), was a designer of surgical instruments and the founder of the Institute of British Surgical Technicians: he was a humanist who "despised the profit motive and abhorred cruelty". Her mother was Emma Spering Jones, a school teacher, who when Jane was only four became lame for the rest of her life as the result of a road accident. She encouraged her daughters in observation of nature and appreciation of art, and she had a keen business sense. Jane had an older sister, Dorothy Stella Radcliffe Drew (1909–1989), who became a physician and student of F. M. Alexander. Jane Drew was educated at Woodford School in East Croydon, then at Croydon High School where she became Head Girl. Among her friends at Woodford School were actresses Diana Wynyard and Peggy Ashcroft. At Croydon High she was friends with the mural artist and book illustrator Barbara Jones and the women's rights campaigner Nancy Seear.

=== Pre-war (1929–1939) ===
Jane Drew studied at the Architectural Association School of Architecture (1929–1934). In 1933 she married architect James Thomas Alliston, who had been a fellow-student at the AA. In 1934, Drew found first employment as an architect with Joseph Hill (1888–1947), where she was also introduced to members of bohemian London who would have a lasting impact on her work. After partnering with her husband, Alliston, they won a competition in 1937 for a cottage hospital in Devon. Their home and small practice (Alliston & Drew) was at 24 Woburn Square in London, and their principal work was housing in Winchester. The couple had twin daughters. Drew and Alliston's marriage was dissolved in 1939.

=== Modern Movement ===
Drew soon became involved in the Modern Movement, through the Congrès International d'Architecture Moderne (CIAM), whose guiding spirit was the Swiss architect Le Corbusier, and became one of the principal founders of the Modern Movement in Britain, which was represented by MARS (Modern Architectural ReSearch), CIAM's British subsidiary. It was an association of architects, painters and industrialists, and its stated principle was the "use of space for human activity rather than the manipulation of stylised convention". It was through this group that she met Le Corbusier, Elizabeth Lutyens and Maxwell Fry (one of the co-founders of the movement). Drew married Maxwell Fry in 1942.

=== Chandigarh and Le Corbusier ===
After seeing Drew's projects in West Africa, Indian Prime minister Pandit Nehru asked her and Maxwell Fry to design the new capital of Punjab, Chandigarh. She was heavily involved with the Festival of Britain at the time and was unsure of her ability to take on such a large role in the project. Drew used her considerable charm to great effect, convincing Swiss Architect Le Corbusier to involve himself in the project. Le Corbusier was responsible for the main plan of the city and the principal government buildings – the High Court, Assembly, the Secretariat, etc. Drew first met Le Corbusier before the War at C.I.A.M. (Congrès International des Architects Modernes). She was impressed by the breadth of his knowledge, his experience in addressing the problems of housing in under developed countries, by the power of his personality, and the lucidity of his razor sharp logic. According to Drew, despite his greatness, "he made many mistakes – as does anyone who tries anything new. Among these were the concrete brises soleil to his buildings which acted as heat sinks, radiating heat all night, without cooling, before reheating in the sun the following day. Another mistake could have been the separation of shopkeeper's living quarters from their shops. With the greatest difficulty I persuaded him to allow people to live above their shops! Despite everything, we became firm friends."

Pandit Nehru wanted Chandigarh to be a model city for the thousands of refugees who were arriving daily from Pakistan. He did not want to follow the traditions of the past, but to experiment with new forms of design and planning. As a result of his policy Drew, Fry and Le Corbusier were able to integrate schools, family planning and health clinics, open air swimming baths and open air Theatres with the housing. All the houses had proper sanitary facilities and a good water supply. The cheaper housing was all of a terrace type which allowed the occupants to have larger rooms and more security for their money. Before large numbers were built, Drew constructed prototypes of each different house type which were then lived in, criticised, and improved. In this way she found that the Indians were able to experiment with new types of dwelling. Public open space was provided for all low income housing. House rentals were graded so that no more than a tenth of man's income went on rent. The keeping of animals (such as buffaloes and cows) was banned in the housing, since this custom had led to much fly-borne disease. The Indians were to realise that many of their traditional forms of housing were obsolete and were willing to try out new ways of living. The design of new forms of Housing affected house design throughout India.

=== War time (1939–1945) ===
Architecture at the time was a male-dominated profession. When Jane practised alone in the war years between 1939 and 1944, her office was at 12 King Street, St. James, London. Initially she employed only female architects, though later this changed. Her work included:

- 1940 Walton Yacht Works at Walton on Thames, near London
- 1941 Kitchen Planning Exhibition, Dorland Hall, Lower Regent Street, London
- 1941–1943 Consultancy to the British Commercial Gas Association 'designed by women for women'
- 1943 The 'Rebuilding Britain' exhibition at the National Gallery, London
- 1944 Temporary office at 12 Bedford Square after the King Street office was bombed (with Riehm Marcus, Trevor Dannatt, K. Linden and F.I. Marcus)
- 1944–1945 Assistant Planning Adviser to the Resident Minister for the West African Colonies

=== Post-war period (1946–1959) ===
After the war she went into business partnership with Maxwell Fry as Fry, Drew and Partners, then later with others. From January 1946 their practice was at 63 Gloucester Place, London W.1. (above which she and Fry had a flat which was their home), and in 1962 a second office was opened at 3 Albany Terrace. She was in practice with Max Fry until 1977.

- 1946–1950 Practised as Maxwell Fry and Jane Drew
- 1946–1962 Jane was founder-editor and joint editor (with Trevor Dannatt) of the Architects' Year Book, brainchild of publisher Paul Elek
- 1946 The 'Britain Can Make It' exhibition at the Victoria and Albert Museum
- 1948 Ghana: Mampong Teacher's Training College and Prempeh College in Kumasi (with Maxwell Fry)
- 1949 Hospital building for the Kuwait Oil Company
- 1949 Harlow New Town: The Chantry and Tanys Dell estates: 3- & 4-bedroom terraced houses and 4-storey flats (with Maxwell Fry)
- 1950 Ghana: Adisadel College and Wesley Girls' High School in the town of Cape Coast (with Maxwell Fry)
- 1950 Passfields flats in Lewisham, London (with Maxwell Fry)
- 1950 Interior design for the ICA (Institute of Contemporary Arts) at 17/18 Dover Street, London (with Maxwell Fry, and the collaboration of Eduardo Paolozzi, Nigel Henderson, Neil Morris and Terence Conran). Jane played an important part in its relocation to Carlton House Terrace in 1964.
- 1951–1958 Practised as Fry, Drew, Drake and Lasdun (with Lindsay Drake and Denys Lasdun)
- 1951 New Schools building, the Waterloo entrance tower and the Riverside Restaurant for the Festival of Britain (with Maxwell Fry)
- 1951–1953 in collaboration with Le Corbusier and his cousin Pierre Jeanneret, Jane and Max worked as senior architects on much of the housing of Chandigarh, the new capital of western part of the divided Punjab in India. Jane persuaded Le Corbusier to involve himself in the project and he redesigned Albert Meyer's original master plan. Le Corbusier left most of the design to Jane, Max and Jeanneret, and they had the collaboration of a team of Indian architects (including B. V. Doshi) on this vast project.

== Other works ==
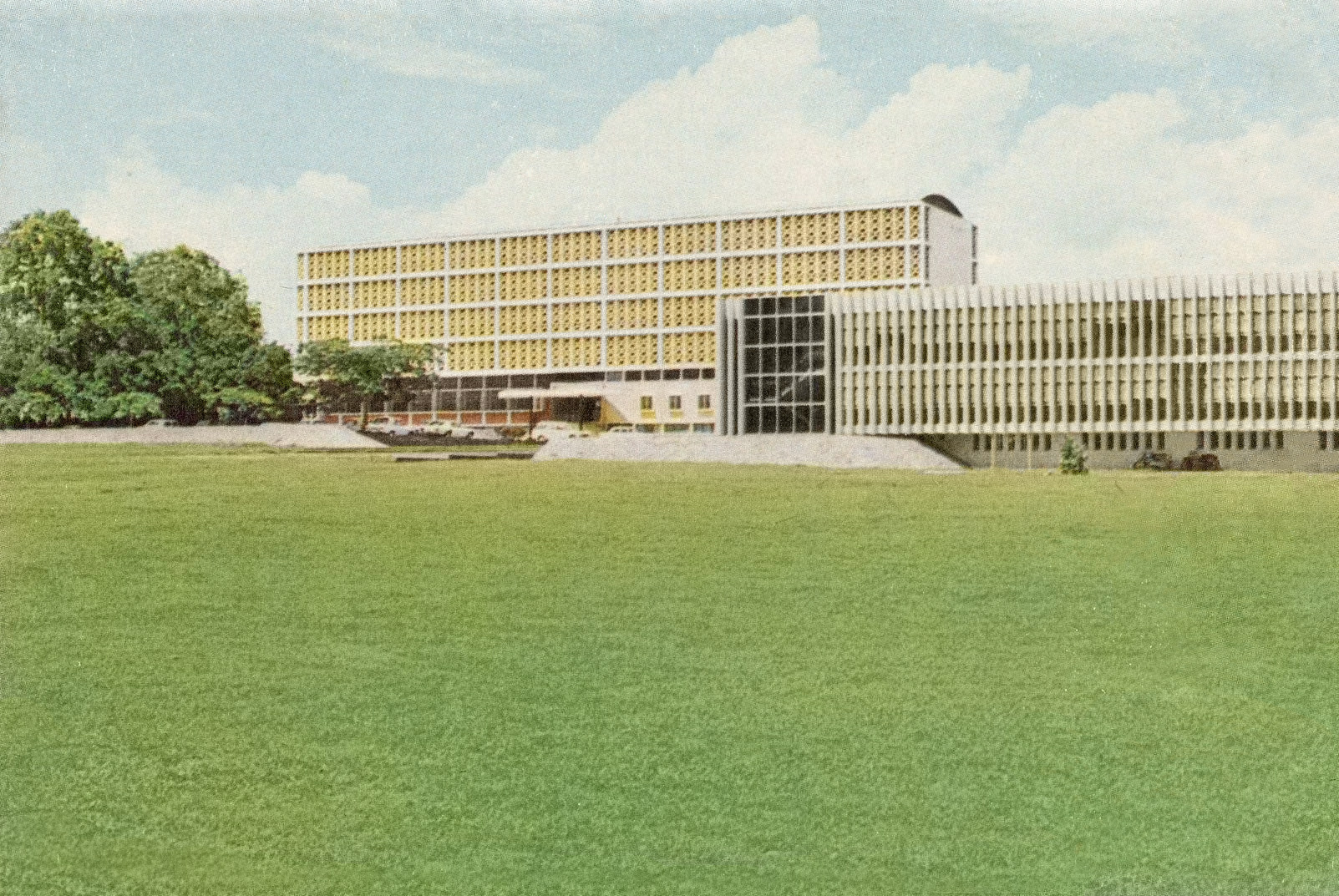
Kenneth Onwuka Dike Library, University of Ibadan, Nigeria

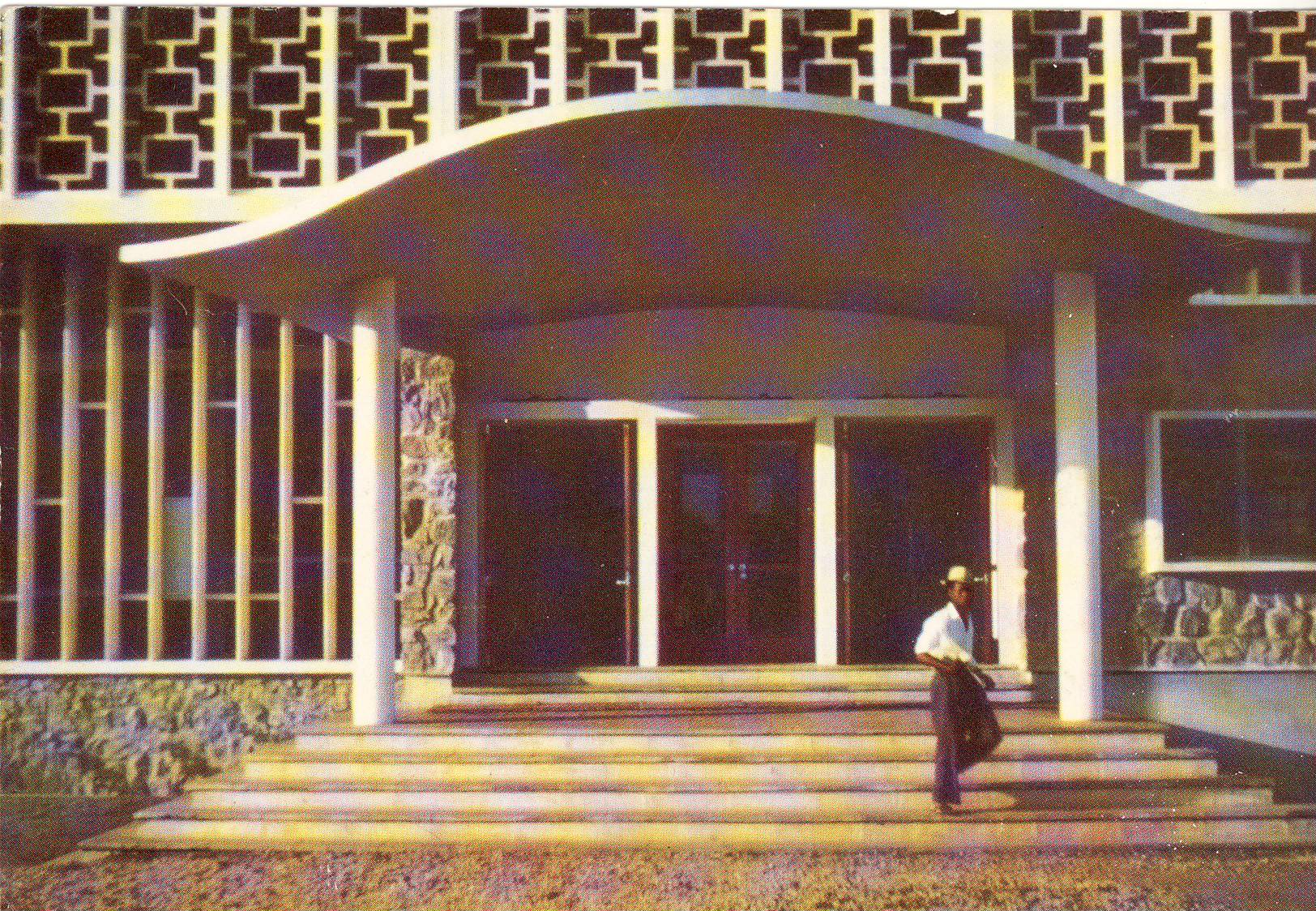
Kenneth Onwuka Dike Library, University of Ibadan, Nigeria (detail)

Inner court of apartment building, University of Ibadan, Nigeria

- 1953–1959 Buildings in Ibadan, Nigeria: the University College (with Maxwell Fry), the Cooperative Bank, and an Assembly Hall and Maisonettes
- 1953 Flats at Whitefoot Lane, Downham Estate, Lewisham, London (with Maxwell Fry)
- 1955 Housing at Masjid-i-Suleiman (the first oil site in the middle east) for Oil Company employees and planning of a new oilfield town at Gachsaran, South Iran
- 1955–1958 Worked with Denys Lasdun on the design of the Usk Street Housing Estate in Bethnal Green, London
- 1958–1973 Practised as Fry, Drew and Partners (with Frank Knight and Norman Creamer)
- 1959 Cooperative Bank, Offices and Shop, Lagos, Nigeria
- 1959 Cooperative Bank, Assembly Hall and Maisonettes, Ibadan, Nigeria
- 1959 Gulf House, Gulf Oil Company, London

=== Later years (1960–1979) ===
- 1960 Lionel Wendt Art Memorial Centre, Colombo, Sri Lanka
- 1960 House at Hyver Hill, Hendon, London for Mr & Mrs Broadbent
- 1962 Fry, Drew & Partners opened a second office, at 3 Albany Terrace, London NW1
- 1964 Training Centre, Apowa, Ghana
- 1964 Housing in the towns of Hatfield and Welwyn
- 1964 Shell House, Singapore
- 1964–1966 Conversion of 12 Carlton House Terrace for the ICA, London
- 1965 Ahmadu Bello Stadium and Swimming Pool, Kaduna, Nigeria
- 1965 Women's' Teacher Training College, Kano, Nigeria
- 1965 Hotel in Colombo, Sri Lanka
- 1967 Margaret Pyke Memorial (Family Planning) Centre, London (opened by Prince Philip, Duke of Edinburgh)
- 1968 Torbay Hospital and Nurses' Residence, Torquay, Devon
- 1968 School for Deaf Children, Herne Hill, London
- 1968 Mauritius National Assembly, Port Louis, (with Maxwell Fry)
- 1968 Mauritius Sir Seewoosagur Ramgoolam Hospital, Pamplemousses
- 1969–1977 Buildings for the Open University, Milton Keynes, Buckinghamshire
- 1970 Carlton House Terrace for the Institute of Contemporary Arts, London
- 1973 Gestetner Building, Stirling, Scotland
- 1977 Mauritius Institute of Education (with Maxwell Fry)
- 1979 St. Paul's Girls' School, London Science Block

=== Retirement (1979–1996) ===
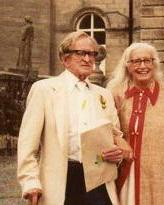
Jane Drew with husband Maxwell Fry in 1984

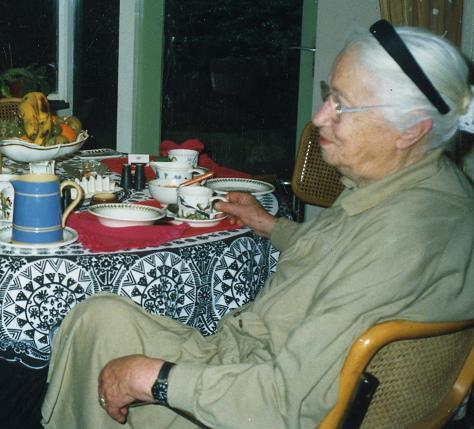
Jane Drew at West Lodge, 1991

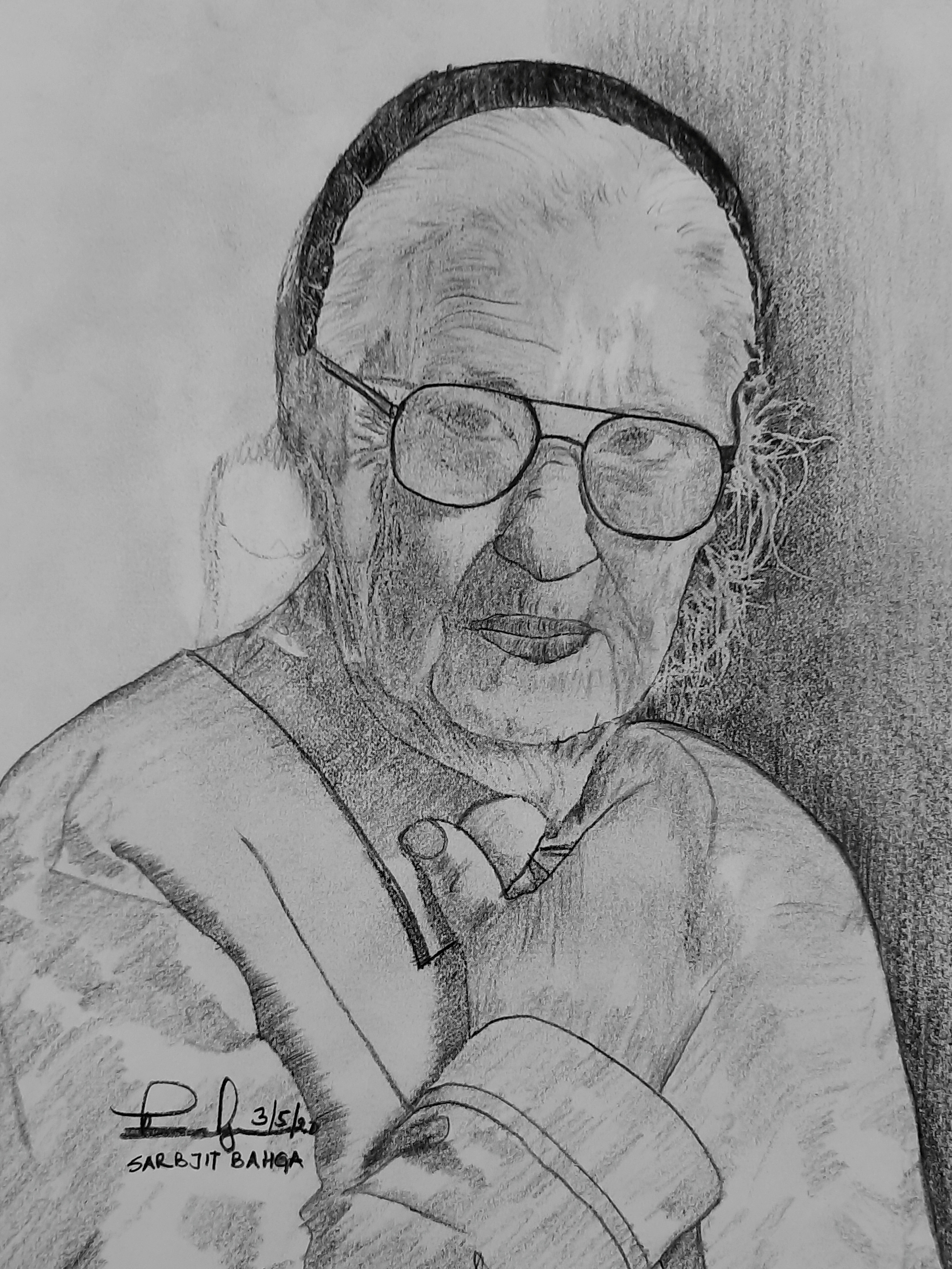
A pencil sketch of Jane Drew

Max had retired in 1973, but Jane continued working until 1979, when they both lived at their country retreat "The Lake House", at Rowfant near Crawley in Sussex, where they had often socialised with friends and family. It was a large house, to which they had added a studio-flat overlooking the fishing lake, and Jane presided over many memorable house and garden parties. In 1982 they decided to sell it and find somewhere easier to manage in their retirement. They were staying with a friend in the village of Cotherstone, County Durham when they heard that the next door house was for sale and almost immediately bought it. So by Christmas 1982 they had moved to "West Lodge", Cotherstone. They remained active, in making a new home, with gardening and village social life. There was a studio for Max and their living room was dominated by Max's mural of the River Balder Railway viaduct.

In 1984, Jane gave a great party for Max's 85th birthday, at nearby Lartington Hall: there were over 200 guests – friends and family. Two years later she was presented with a 150-page book of gratulari inscribed "Jane B. Drew, architect. A tribute from colleagues and friends for her 75th birthday, 24 March 1986". The list of contributors includes:

Maxwell Fry (Introductory Poem), Jean Sabbagh, Síle Flower, Lesley Donaldson, Maurice Down, Leonie Cohn, Hugh Crallan, Michael Thornley, Ruth Plant, Phyllis Dobbs, Ed Lewis, Dorothy Morland, Maud Hatmil, Diana Rowntree, Rodney Thomas, John Terry, Trevor Dannatt, Riehm Marcus, Anthony Bell, Norman Creamer, Peter Dunican, Luke Gertler, Frank Knight, John Lomax and Heather Hughes, Joan Cheverton, Stephen Macfarlane, Lleky Papastavrou and Penelope "Penny" Hughes, Otto Koenigsberger, Theo Crosby, Norman and Kay Starrett, Geoffrey Knight, Minnette de Silva, Ian Robertson, Dennis Lennon, Sean Graham, John Godwin and Gillian Hopwood, Achyut Kanvinde, Gopal Khosla, Peggy Angus, Eulie Chowdhury, Shireen Mahdavi, Neil Wates, Lady Mary Pickard, Sián Flower, Marion Gair, Peter and Christine Rawsthorne, Michael Raymond, Sir Hugh Casson, Cedric Price, Baroness Lee, Delia Tyrwhitt, Lord Reilly, Lord Elwyn-Jones, William MacQuitty, Arnold Whittick, Elizabeth and Mervyn Dalley, Romi Khosla, Roz Jacobs, Noma Copley, Kenane Barlow, Sergei Kadleigh, Maria Luisa Plant Zaccheo, Lord Goodman, Lady Jean Medawar, Arunendu Das, J.R. Bhalla, The Lord Perry, Victor Pasmore, Mike Lacey, Nigel Wood, Peter Greenham, Sunita Kanvinde, Tony Forrest, Heather Brigstocke, Peter Murray, Berthold Lubetkin, Frances Webb Leishman, Robert Bliss, Viren Sahai, Sir John Summerson, Patrick Harrison, Ebenezer Akita, Charles Correa, and Olufemi Majekodunmi.

== Death ==
Max Fry died in 1987. Jane Drew died from cancer in 1996, aged 85. She was buried near St. Romald's church in Romaldkirk.

== Friends ==
Among her personal friends and associates were; Alvar Aalto and Ove Arup, architects; artists Delia Tyrwhitt, Eduardo Paolozzi, Marcel Duchamp, Barbara Hepworth, Roland Penrose, Peggy Angus, Ben Nicholson and Lynn Chadwick; art and design promoters Daniel-Henry Kahnweiler and Peter Gregory; playwright and theatre producer Benn Levy; poet, literary critic, and philosopher of modern art Herbert Read; writers Richard Hughes and Kathleen Raine; politician-reformers Jennie Lee, Lord Goodman and Pandit Nehru; actress Constance Cummings; and composer Elizabeth Lutyens.

== Awards and honours ==
- 1961 Beamis Professor, MIT (Massachusetts Institute of Technology), USA
- 1966 Hon LL.D., University of Ibadan, Nigeria
- 1970 Visiting Professor, Harvard University, USA
- 1973 Honorary Doctorate, Open University, Milton Keynes, England
- 1976 Bicentennial Professor, University of Utah, USA
- 1978 Honorary Fellow of the American Institute of Architects
- 1985 Honorary Fellow of the Nigerian Institute of Architects, Lagos, Nigeria
- 1987 Honorary DLitt, Newcastle University, England
- 1994 Honorary DArch, University of the Witwatersrand, Johannesburg, South Africa
- 1996 DBE (Dame Commander of the Order of the British Empire) in the New Year Honours
- Honorary Fellow, University of Hull, England

== Positions ==
- President of the Architectural Association (1969–1970)
- Member of the Victoria and Albert Museum Advisory Board
- Member of the City of London Advisory Committee for Conservation Areas
- Member of the Chartered Institute of Arbitrators
- Hon. Fellow of the Institute of Contemporary Arts
- Visiting Professor, Antwerp, Belgium
- Visiting Professor, Harvard, USA
- Member of the R.I.B.A. Council (1964–1970) and (1971–1974)

== Publications ==
- Jane and Maxwell Fry, Architecture for Children. London: George Allen and Unwin, 1944. Republished 1976 as Architecture and the Environment.
- Jane Drew and John Heartfield, Kitchen Planning: a brochure of new plans and suggestions for labour saving kitchens. London: The Gas Industry, 1945. ASIN: B0127BL10A
- Jane B. Drew. ed. Architects' Year Book. London: Paul Elek, 1945 ISBN 978-0-236-15431-9. Jane Drew was the founder of the Architects' Year Book.
- Jane B. Drew, ed. Architects' Year Book 2. London: Paul Elek, 1947.
- J. B. Drew and E. Maxwell Fry, Village Housing in the Tropics: with special reference to West Africa, In collaboration with Harry L. Ford. London: Lund Humphries, 1947.
- Jane B. Drew and Trevor Dannatt, eds. Architects' Year Book 3. London: Paul Elek, 1949.
- Jane B. Drew and Trevor Dannatt, eds. Architects' Year Book 4. London: Paul Elek, 1952.
- E. Maxwell Fry and Jane B. Drew, Chandigarh and Planning Development in India, London: Journal of the Royal Society of Arts, No.4948, 1 April 1955, Vol.CIII, pages 315–333. I. The Plan, by E. Maxwell Fry, II. Housing, by Jane B. Drew.
- E. Maxwell Fry and Jane Drew, Tropical Architecture in the Humid Zone. London: Batsford, 1956.
- E. Maxwell Fry and Jane Drew, Tropical Architecture in the Dry and Humid Zones. New York: Reinhold, 1964.
- Jane Drew, The Work of Rodney Thomas – architect. Booklet produced to accompany an exhibition arranged by Lewin Bassingthwaite and Christopher Yetto. London, 1967.
- Jane and Maxwell Fry, Architecture and the Environment. London: George Allen and Unwin, 1976. ISBN 978-0-04-720020-5 Republication of 1944 Architecture for Children.
- Jane Drew, Ann Tyng, Gae Aulenti, Denise Scott Brown, Monica Pidgeon, Anna Bofil, Indira Rai, Bola Sobande, Ellen Perry Berkeley, Eulie Chowdhuri and others. The crisis of Identity in Architecture – Report of the proceedings of the International Congress of Women Architects. Ramsar, Iran, 1976.

== Bibliography ==
- Flower, Sile; Macfarlane, Jean; Plant, Ruth (1986). Jane B. Drew, architect: A tribute from her colleagues and friends for her 75th birthday 24 March 1986. Bristol: Bristol Centre for the Advancement of Architecture. ISBN 0-9510759-0-X.
- Fry, Maxwell (1975). Autobiographical Sketches. London: Elek. ISBN 0-236-40010-X.
- Jackson, Iain; Holland, Jessica (2014). The architecture of Edwin Maxwell Fry and Jane Drew. Farnham, Surrey: Ashgate Publishing Limited. ISBN 978-1-4094-5198-3.
- Joshi, Kiran (1999). Documenting Chandigarh: The Indian Architecture of Pierre Jeanneret, Edwin Maxwell Fry and Jane Beverly Drew. Ahmedabad: Mapin Publishing in association with Chandigarh College of Architecture. ISBN 1-890206-13-X.

== Audio recordings ==
- 1970 British Library Archival Sound Recordings: Drew, Jane, former president of the Architectural Association. Bow Dialogues Jane Drew in conversation with Joseph McCulloch, Rector of St Mary-le-Bow Church.
- 1995 British Library Archival Sound Recordings. NLSC: Architects Lives Jane Drew interviewed by Margaret Garlake (4 tapes F4823/4/5/6)
- 1995 British Library Archival Sound Recordings. NLSC: Architects Lives Oriana Mitton, Jane Drew's grand-niece, interviewed by Margaret Garlake (1 tape F4827)

== See also ==
- Jane Drew Prize
