= Fry, Drew and Partners =

British architectural firm

Fry, Drew and Partners was an architectural practice established by UK architects Maxwell Fry and Jane Drew.

== History ==
Fry, Drew and Partners was formally created in 1950 from the 'Office of Maxwell Fry and Jane Drew' (established 1946). From 1952 the partnership was expanded to include Lindsey Drake and Denys Lasdun as Fry, Drew, Drake and Lasdun.

Based in London, the partnership gained commissions from within the UK, as well as worldwide - in particular former British Colonies in Africa, the Middle East, and India - Fry and Drew were key figures in the development of the governmental complex at Chandigarh, India.

== Projects ==
- Studio at Hertingfordbury, Herts
- Studio at Rowlant, Sussex
- Studio at Longpont-sur-Orge, near Paris
- Woodsford Square, Kensington, London 1967-74
