= List of schools in the Borough of Darlington =

This is a list of schools in the Borough of Darlington in County Durham, England.

== State-funded schools ==
=== Primary schools ===
- Abbey Infants' School
- Abbey Junior School
- Bishopton Redmarshall CE Primary School
- Corporation Road Community Primary School
- Firthmoor Primary School
- Gurney Pease Academy
- Harrowgate Hill Primary School
- Heathfield Primary School
- Heighington CE Primary School
- High Coniscliffe CE Primary School
- Holy Family RC Primary School
- Hurworth Primary School
- Mount Pleasant Primary School
- Mowden Infant School
- Mowden Junior School
- Northwood Primary School
- Polam Hall School
- Red Hall Primary School
- Reid Street Primary School
- The Rydal Academy
- St Augustine's RC Primary School
- St Bede's RC Primary School
- St George's CE Academy
- St John's CE Academy
- St Mary's Cockerton CE Primary School
- St Teresa's RC Primary School
- Skerne Park Academy
- Springfield Academy
- West Park Academy
- Whinfield Primary School

=== Secondary schools ===
- Carmel College
- Haughton Academy
- Hummersknott Academy
- Hurworth School
- Longfield Academy
- Polam Hall School
- St Aidan's Church of England Academy
- Wyvern Academy

=== Special and alternative schools ===
- Beaumont Hill Academy
- Marchbank Free School
- Rise Carr College

=== Further education ===
- Darlington College
- Queen Elizabeth Sixth Form College

== Independent schools ==
=== Special and alternative schools ===
- Embleton View
- Oakwood Learning Centre
- Pear Tree School
- Priory Hurworth House
