= Andrew Fothergill =

English cricketer

Personal information
- Full name: Andrew Robert Fothergill
- Born: 10 February 1962 (age 64); Newcastle upon Tyne, Northumberland, England
- Height: 6 ft 0 in (1.83 m)
- Batting: Right-handed
- Role: Wicketkeeper

Domestic team information
- Years: Team
- 1982–1993: Durham
- 1989–1991: Minor Counties

Career statistics
Competition	FC	LA
Matches	12	50
Runs scored	127	383
Batting average	7.93	14.73
100s/50s	–/–	–/–
Top score	29	45*
Balls bowled	–	–
Wickets	–	–
Bowling average	–	–
5 wickets in innings	–	–
10 wickets in match	–	–
Best bowling	–	–
Catches/stumpings	16/3	49/14
- Source: Cricinfo, 23 December 2009

Andrew Robert Fothergill (born 10 February 1962 in Newcastle upon Tyne, Northumberland) is a former English first-class cricketer. He was a right-handed batsman who played primarily as a wicketkeeper.

== Early life ==
Fothergill was born on 10 February 1962 in Newcastle upon Tyne, Northumberland, England. He was educated at Dodmire Junior School and Eastbourne Comprehensive School in Darlington.

== Career ==
Fothergill first represented Durham in the 1982 Minor Counties Championship where he made his debut against Cumberland. He represented Durham in 48 Minor Counties Championship matches, the last of which came against Suffolk in 1991.

Between 1983 and Durham's promotion to first-class status in 1992, he made eight one-day appearances, making his debut in 1982 against Lancashire. Fothergill also represented a combined Minor Counties team nine times.

In 1990, he made his first-class debut for the combined Minor Counties against the touring Indians, who had Mohammad Azharuddin, Kapil Dev, Anil Kumble and Sachin Tendulkar in their team.

In 1992, Durham became a first-class county and thereby gained entry to the 1992 County Championship. Fothergill's first first-class match for Durham came against Kent in May 1992. He represented Durham in eleven first-class matches, with his final appearance coming in against Somerset. His final one-day match for the club came against Somerset, in what was his 50th List-A match.
