= Whinfield =

Coordinates: 54.548°N 1.525°W

- Location within County Durham
- OS grid reference: NZ308171
- Unitary authority: Darlington
- Ceremonial county: County Durham
- Region: North East
- Country: England
- Sovereign state: United Kingdom
- Post town: Darlington
- Postcode district: DL1
- Police: Durham
- Fire: County Durham and Darlington
- Ambulance: North East

Whinfield is a suburb of Darlington, in the Borough of Darlington in County Durham, England. It is situated to the north of Darlington.

== Transport ==
Originally several bus routes (by different companies) called in the Whinfield area. However, now Arriva North East routes 6A/6B, 10, 17 and X66 operate to Darlington.

== Education ==
Schools within the area include Whinfield Primary School (for students aged 4–11) and the Education Village. The EV is the first of its kind in the world, linking three schools on one site, Haughton Academy (for students aged 11–16), Springfield Academy (for students aged 3–11) and Beaumont Hill Academy (for students aged 2–19 with special needs).
