= Don Featherstone (filmmaker, 1902–1984) =

Australian filmmaker (1902–1984)

- Born: Sydney Featherstone; 16 November 1902; Darlington
- Died: 6 May 1984 (aged 81); Toowoomba, Queensland
- Occupation(s): painter, nurse
- Known for: film making

Sydney (Don) Featherstone (1902–1984) BEM is known for his work as an amateur filmmaker in Australia, being awarded a British Empire Medal for services to cinephotography.

Featherstone was an awarded ambulance officer, receiving the insignia of the serving brother of the Order of St John in 1966.

From the 1920s to the 1980s Featherstone made 55 films across genre including fiction, travel, history, and documentary. His work was mainly focussed on the Darling Downs, and includes the 1954 royal visit. (Note: The official Australian Government film record of the visit to Toowoomba was lost in a plane crash.)

== Early life and education ==
Featherstone was born on 16 November 1902 at Darlington, England. He was the second of six sons. His father, Joseph Featherstone, was a railway shunter and an ambulanceman. His mother was Eliza Dorothy, née Moody.

Featherstone started school at Harrowgate Hill Primary School, Darlington. The family migrated to Toowoomba, Queensland in 1911, and Featherstone's education continued at Toowoomba East State School to 1914, when he left school at the age of 12.

His early employment was as a boot delivery-boy, then as a coach-trimmer and signwriter. Featherstone was nicknamed 'Don' to avoid confusion with another apprentice. He later worked in Brisbane and then returned to Toowoomba as a painter at the city's foundry in 1927.

== Adult life ==
Featherstone was a member of two local entertainment groups, the Bohemian Club, including being its president, and the Merry Makers, and played steel guitar.

He joined the Toowoomba Art Society in 1927, and is recognised as a locally significant artist on the Darling Downs. Featherstone won prizes for his paintings at the Royal Adelaide Show and the 1954 Brisbane Exhibition. The watercolour 'Longview' by Featherstone was included in the curated 20th anniversary exhibition by the Toowoomba Regional Art Gallery. Otherworks include 'Golden Tree', water colour, 'Toowoomba Town Hall', water colour.

Featherstone married Emmie Gillam, of Toowoomba, on 25 February 1933. They had one daughter.

During retirement he introduced art as therapy at the Toowoomba Mental Hospital, and taught adult education classes in painting.

He died at Toowoomba on 6 May 1984, and, Brush, Camera and Memories: seventy years in Toowoomba, his autobiography, was published in 1985.

== Career ==
While working at the Toowoomba Foundry, Featherstone undertook first-aid training, and in 1939 received his instructor's certificate from the St John Ambulance Association. From 1942 he worked as a medical orderly at Wallangara, Canungra, and Truscott in the Civil Construction Corp.

Featherstone became an ambulance officer in 1946 at the Toowoomba station of the Queensland Ambulance Transport Brigade. He also worked as an honorary instructor.

Featherstone combined his interest in film with his work in first aid presenting film programmes on the subject.

He became a nurse in 1961, an occupation Featherstone kept until 1968. He instructed in first-aid at the Toowoomba Mental Hospital from 1965, and on 27 July 1966 he was awarded with the insignia of the serving brother of the Order of St John.

== Film ==
Featherstone started his life as a filmmaker in 1926, when he bought a second hand camera, a 16-mm Kodascope.

In 1952 he was a foundation member of the Darling Downs Amateur Cine Society, (Note: Now known as the Darling Downs Movie Makers.) and became a life member in 1961.

He was widely acknowledged as the best amateur filmmaker in Australia, and his collection of films was passed to the Heritage Building Society in 1982.

=== Awards and recognition ===
- Winner in Adelaide Filmo Club's 25th Australia wide Film Competition in 1963 for Bush Critics (1961)
- One of "The Ten Best Films" in the 37th PSA-MPD International Film Festival for Under the Kurrajong (1966)

The scene composition is a joy to the eye, and cutting gives the film a different pace from many of this type.

- An "Honorable Mention" in the 37th PSA-MPD International Film Festival for Narraburra (1966)

... is a slick piece of drama ...

- British Empire Medal in 1978 for services to cinephotography.

== Memoria ==
- The Don Featherstone Memorial Trophy is awarded annually in May by the Darling Downs Movie Makers for best story movie up to five minutes in duration.

== Filmography ==
Film work by Featherstone includes:

- Bush Critics (1961); screened by the Federation of Australian Amateur Cine Societies 1968
- Under the Kurrajong (1966)
- Narraburra (1966)
