= Harrowgate =

Harrowgate may refer to:

- Harrowgate, Philadelphia, United States, a neighborhood of Philadelphia
- Harrowgate Hill, a suburb of Darlington in the north of England
- Harrowgate Village in the Borough of Darlington in the north of England

== See also ==
- Harrogate, a town in North Yorkshire, England
- Harrogate (disambiguation)
