= Darlington Mechanics Institute =

Coordinates: 54.5243°N 1.5574°W

Darlington Mechanics Institute is a large, imposing building at 82 Skinnergate in Darlington in the North East of England. Mechanics' Institutes were introduced in 1821 to help the working class educate themselves, giving access to newspapers and books.

The design of the building is attributed by English Heritage to William Richardson and John Ross, both born in 1836 and apprenticed to Joshua Sparkes (d.1855). However, a book of original architectural designs in Darlington Library includes Sparkes's original design for the institute, alongside designs by Richardson and Ross dated 1851, when they were only 15. The foundation stone was laid 12 May 1853 by Elizabeth Pease of Feethams, whose £400 donation was the largest received towards the building's £2,300 cost. It was officially opened on 1 September 1854 by Elizabeth and her new husband, John Pringle Nichol, who she had married ten days after laying the foundation.

In November 1877, two plaster casts of Thomas Earle's (d.1876) busts of Queen Victoria and Prince Albert were unveiled on either side of the stage at the institute. These were considered art treasures of Darlington, but were destroyed during World War I. At this time the institute was at its peak with over 400 members and a library numbering over 3,000 books. With the emergence of public libraries and technical colleges, the institute's role as a centre for self-improvement became less essential, and by the end of the 19th century, it was more of a social venue. Through the first half of the 20th century films, auctions, and public meetings were held there.

In January 1959 the building let its ground floor to Newcastle Savings Bank, while the Institute relocated to the upper floor. Following the bank's vacating in the early 1980s, the building stood empty until becoming an American diner/bar in 1991. The institute, now reduced to 30 members, met in the attic. As of 2014, the building is being refurbished as a nightclub and bar, while the institute is a private snooker club located in nearby Bondgate.
