= Darlington Town Hall =

Municipal building in Darlington, County Durham, England

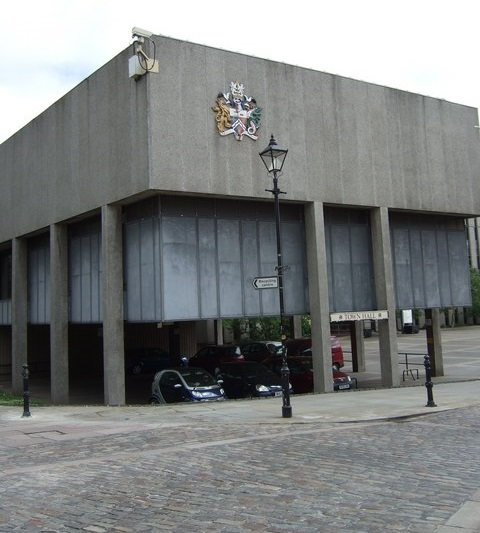
- Darlington Town Hall

- Shown in County Durham
- 54.5237°N 1.5530°W
- Location: Feethams, Darlington

History
- Built: 1970

Site notes
- Architect(s): Williamson, Faulkner Brown and Partners
- Architectural style: Brutalist style

Darlington Town Hall is a municipal building in Feethams, Darlington, County Durham, England. It is the meeting place of Darlington Borough Council.

== History ==
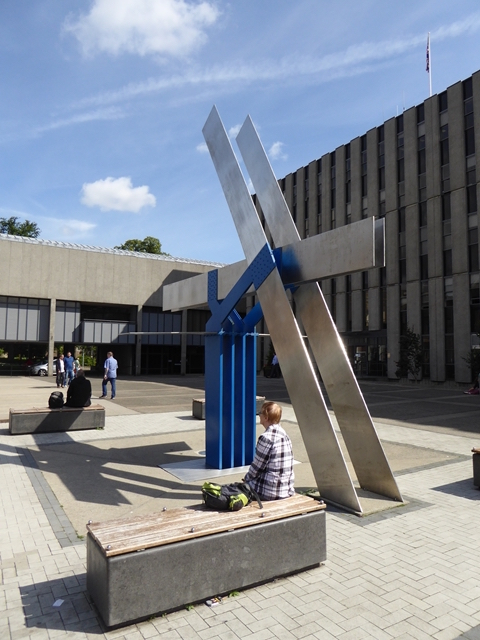
The zinc and stainless steel structure, designed by John Hoskin, known as "Resurgence"

In the late 1960s proposals were developed by the Shepherd Building Group to demolish the town's market hall and redevelop the area: these proposals were supported by the Conservative administration on the Borough Council. The borough architect, Eric Tornbohm, subsequently developed plans, which were supported by the successor Labour Party administration to create a series of "concrete and glass boxes" in the area. After Alfred Waterhouse's town hall became inadequate, civic leaders decided to construct the first of these "concrete and glass boxes": the site they selected in Feethams had been occupied by the Lead Yard Bus Station which itself had been built on the site of the old Darlington Union Workhouse.

The foundation stone for the new building was laid by the Minister of Housing and Local Government, Anthony Greenwood, on 30 November 1967. It was designed by Williamson, Faulkner Brown and Partners and was opened by Princess Anne on 27 May 1970. The design involved a long concrete tower block facing onto Feethams with another block jutting out of the rear. Internally, the principal room was the council chamber which was decorated with vertical strips of elm wood.

A zinc and stainless steel structure, intended to depict the resurgence of the area, was designed by John Hoskin and erected outside the town hall. When Princess Anne was asked to unveil a small plaque linked to the structure, Michael Palin records in his diaries that she turned to the journalist, Kate Adie, and exclaimed "F*** Me". The plaque referred to "The Spirit of New Darlington" but the structure subsequently became known as "Resurgence".

The town hall initially served as the headquarters of Darlington County Borough Council and remained the local seat of government when the enlarged Darlington District Council was formed in 1974. It went on to become the headquarters of the new unitary authority, Darlington Borough Council, in 1997. The council chamber subsequently became an approved venue for marriages and civil partnerships.
