= Charlotte Whitehead =

Canadian physician

Charlotte Whitehead (Ross)
- Born: 15 July 1843; Darlington, England
- Died: 21 February 1916 (aged 72); Winnipeg, Manitoba
- Monuments: Charlotte Ross Monument, Whitemouth, MB
- Education: Medical Doctorate
- Alma mater: Women's Medical College of Philadelphia
- Occupation: Physician
- Years active: 1876-1912
- Spouse: David Ross
- Children: 8
- Parent(s): Joseph Whitehead and Isabella Gibbons

Dr. Charlotte Whitehead (Ross) (15 July 1843 – 21 February 1916) was a physician important to Canadian history and Manitoban history for her role as a pioneer for women in medicine, particularly in Manitoba. Despite never being licensed by either the College of Physicians and Surgeons of Quebec or Manitoba, she was nonetheless able to practice medicine in Montreal and Whitemouth for several decades, and served the community in and around Whitemouth to a great degree during the early years of its development.

== Early life and family ==
Born in Darlington, England, on 15 July 1843 to her parents Joseph Whitehead and Isabella Gibbons, Ross emigrated to Canada in 1848, settling in Huron County, Upper Canada. When she was seven years old, both her mother Isabella and her younger brother died within three weeks of each other due to diphtheria. Ross attended public school in Clinton, Ontario, and went to finishing school at the Academy of the Soeurs du Sacre-Coeur at Sault-au-Recollet in northern Montreal. During her schooling in Montreal she won a prize in French, which she had studied intensively, and practiced singing under the tutelage of the father of Madame Albani. At about the time that she was finishing her schooling, her father had begun work with the Canadian Pacific Railway, and had become associated with David Ross, a Scottish immigrant and co-worker of Mr. Whitehead's. At the age of eighteen, Charlotte married Ross, and would bear three children, Isabel, Minnie and Kate, before beginning her medical education.

== Medical studies and early career ==
After marrying, Ross would take responsibility for caring for her chronically ill sister Mary Anne, an experience that apparently stimulated her interest in medicine. She was encouraged to study medicine by the family physician Dr. William Hales Hington, whom she borrowed several medical books from, despite the disapproval of her father. With the understanding that her husband's work on the railway out west would mean that her family would have little access to medical care, she decided to enrol at the Women's Medical College of Philadelphia in 1870, as no Canadian medical college was open to women at that time.

=== Women's Medical College of Philadelphia ===
Ross studied for five years at the medical college, graduating in 1875. Initially, she decided to leave her children in Montreal to be raised by her husband's family, but decided to bring her two younger daughters to Philadelphia with her in 1871. She was prevented from attending the college in the season between 1872 and 1873 due to a difficult pregnancy, from which she gave birth to her fourth daughter Edith. She finished her education with a thesis on the topic of abortion and women's health, and three months after her graduation she gave birth to her first son, Hales.

=== Montreal ===
Ross initially decided not to join her husband out west, and stayed in Montreal, instead running a medical practice to treat women and children, becoming the first female doctor to practice within that city. She did not obtain a medical license in Montreal despite applying for one, but was able to practice under the patronage of Dr. Hingston. While she was successful in her work, she was not welcomed by everyone, and on one occasion returned to her buggy after visiting a patient to find bones scattered across the seat.

By 1880, her husband and father had been relieved of their jobs with the Canadian Pacific Railway after encountering difficulties with construction around Cross Lake, and Ross's father enabled his son-in-law to take over a lumber mill in the area. David moved the lumber mill to the Whitemouth River to the location that is now Whitemouth, Manitoba, before sending for his wife and children in 1881.

== Whitemouth Medical Practice ==
Ross came to Whitemouth in the summer of 1881 with her five children, and treated her first patient the night after she arrived. Her early patients were mostly men, unusual for a female doctor at the time, which was mainly due to the logging industry around Whitemouth and the results of logging accidents that would occur. Many of these initial procedures involved using her surgeon's skills, amputating legs, stitching wounds and setting broken bones due to the many lumber or axe related injuries to the legs or feet. On one occasion, Ross allegedly treated a man who had received an axe wound to the neck during a disagreement, using an ordinary sewing needle and silk to patch the wound.

=== Profession in Whitemouth ===
Eventually, loggers would clear the area and settlers would begin to move in, at which point Ross's practice began to evolve and incorporate more families As the only doctor within a 100-mile radius, she was responsible for a great many people, and would often go above and beyond the call of duty in treating her patients. To get to them, Charlotte would often have to travel great distances without roads, using canoes, ox-teams, horses or sleighs to reach her destinations. Once at her patients homes, she would often not only treat their injury, but also remain at the household for hours in order to clean it and prepare food for the family.

=== Medical License and Registration ===
In 1887, despite having practiced medicine for years without a license, Ross applied to the Manitoba Legislature for registration as a physician, and upon her refusal she instructed a Winnipeg legal firm to file an application for a private act that would authorize her to practice medicine. The license itself was somewhat contentious, as there had been a recent border dispute between Manitoba and Ontario, with Whitemouth being near the border. The act was brought forward in the Legislative Assembly by way of a Private Members Bill in 1888, and was opposed by William Fisher Luxton, arguing on the grounds that women doctors should only treat women and children, that Charlotte ought to be grouped with midwives in terms of her profession and that the matter ought to ultimately be decided by the College of Physicians and Surgeons. The bill was withdrawn before second reading, but Charlotte continued to practice medicine in Whitemouth for decades despite it.

=== Personal life ===
Ross was an important member of the Whitemouth community, and as a devout Presbyterian she ran the Sunday school that her husband had constructed. She welcomed preachers of all major denominations, including Roman Catholic missionary Albert Lacombe, whom she treated for pleurisy in the early 1880s.

In addition to her work at the Sunday school, Ross enjoyed baking, embroidery, knitting and music, especially the piano, and was responsible for cultivating roses which was thought to be an impossible feat in the climate of that part of Manitoba.

Following the death of her husband in 1912, Ross moved to Winnipeg. She lived there for four years, dying on February 21, 1916, at the age of 74. She was buried by the Knox Presbyterian church, and floral tributes came across Canada in acknowledgement of her career.

== Legacy ==
In November 1993 Ross was granted a license to practice posthumously when Liberal MLA Sharon Carstairs introduced a resolution to that effect in the Manitoba Legislature.

Her granddaughter Edith Ross would present the Dr. Charlotte Ross Gold Medal in Obstetrics, awarded to the student with the highest honours in obstetrics in the Manitoba Medical College. The award would originally be granted by the University of Manitoba Medical Faculty Women's Club, but is now being awarded by Ross's descendants.

A monument has been erected on the grounds of the Whitemouth Municipal Museum in Ross's honour. The monument has been declared a Historic Site of Manitoba.
