= Garry Williamson Barnes =

English footballer (born 1982)

Garry Barnes
Personal information
- Full name: Garry Williamson Barnes
- Date of birth: 24 January 1982 (age 44)
- Place of birth: Darlington, England
- Position: Striker

Team information
- Current team: West Auckland Town

Youth career
- 1997–2000: Darlington

Senior career*
Years	Team	Apps	(Gls)
2000–2001	Darlington	6	(2)
2001	→ Spennymoor United (loan)		
2001	Yavapai College	25	(29)
2003–2005	Shildon		
2005–2006	Durham City		
2006	Newcastle Blue Star		
2006–2007	Tow Law Town		
2007–2009	West Auckland Town		
2009	Spennymoor Town		
2010	West Auckland Town		
- * Club domestic league appearances and goals

Garry Williamson Barnes (born 24 January 1982), formerly known as Garry Williamson, is an English footballer who played in the Football League for Darlington. He joined West Auckland Town before the 2010–11 season.

== Career ==
Barnes was born in Darlington and joined his home-town club in 1997. Then known as Garry Williamson, he turned professional in 2000 and made his Football League debut for Darlington on 12 August 2000 as a second-half substitute in a 1–1 draw away at Rochdale. He made five more appearances in League Two, and four in cup competitions, and spent some time on loan at Northern Premier League club Spennymoor United.

At the end of the 2000–01 season, Williamson turned down Darlington's offer of a contract extension, preferring to move to the United States to take up a scholarship at Yavapai College, Arizona, where he led the 2001 offensive rankings for Division 1 of the National Junior College Athletic Association.

He returned to England and, by then using the surname Barnes, signed for Shildon of the Northern League, for whom he scored 53 goals in 52 appearances in the 2003–04 season, a performance which earned him the award of Northern League Player of the Year, and his 34 league goals made him the season's top scorer. In the same season, Shildon reached the First Round Proper of the FA Cup, only to be beaten by Notts County of Division Two – five levels above Shildon – 7–2; Barnes, who had scored eight goals during the qualifying rounds, added a 63rd-minute penalty.

Before the 2005–06 season Barnes left Shildon for rivals Durham City, but a few months later he moved on again, this time to Newcastle Blue Star, with whom he won the Northern League title. He began the next season at Tow Law Town, but joined West Auckland Town during the season, and was leading scorer for the club in 2008–09. He joined Spennymoor Town for the 2009–10 season, and helped them win the Northern League title but then left at the close of that season due to work commitments. Barnes rejoined West Auckland in August 2010.
