= South Park, Darlington =

Park in Darlington, County Durham, England

South Park
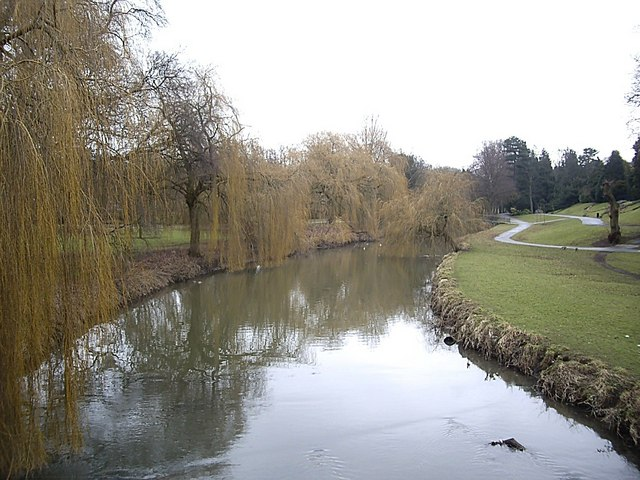
- South Park
- Interactive map of South Park
- Type: Park
- Location: Darlington, County Durham, England
- Coordinates: 54°30′56″N 1°33′28″W
- Operator: Darlington Borough Council
- Open: All year

South Park is a historic park in Darlington, County Durham, England. It is Grade II listed with Historic England.

== History ==
The earliest record of the park dates to the will of Sir James Belasses in 1636, he left Poor Howdens Farm to the town of Darlington for charitable purposes. In 1850 the trustees of the charity suggested it "be used as a park or promenade and a recreation ground for the public at large". This was confirmed in 1851 and two years later the park was opened, it was called Belasses Park after its benefactor, then later it was known as People's Park. The South West corner of the park was formerly the grounds of Polam Hall which is now a school. The park is Grade II listed with Historic England and was the first Victorian park in North East England. The park has an aviary whose most famous resident was a parrot called Max who shocked visitors with his swearing.

== Landmarks ==
The park contains three landmarks; the bandstand is Grade II listed, and so is the fountain. Polam Lane Bridge over the River Skerne gives access to the park and is also Grade II listed.

== Facilities ==
The facilities are a bandstand, play park, multi-use games area, skate park, bowling green, green gym, aviary and cafe. The pavilion has a clock tower, there is a refreshment kiosk dating to 1908 and flower beds with a terracotta jardiniere. To the North there is a lake with three islands, the perimeter of which was planted with poplars. The park has held a Green Flag Award since 2006.

== Darlington South Park Bowls Club ==
The park is home to a historic and prestigious Bowls Club that was formed in March 1896 (originally as Darlington Park Bowls Club). Although the facility is owned by Darlington Borough Council, the green and changing rooms that are within Clocktower Lodge are run by the bowls club.
