= Harrogate (disambiguation) =

Harrogate is a town in North Yorkshire, England

Harrogate may also refer to:

in England

- The Borough of Harrogate, a former local government district in North Yorkshire
- Harrogate (UK Parliament constituency), a former constituency
- Harrogate railway station
- Harrogate Town F.C., a football club
- Harrogate Spring Water, a bottled water company based in Harrogate

elsewhere

- Harrogate, Tennessee, United States, a city
- Harrogate, South Australia, a town

== See also ==
- Harrowgate (disambiguation)
