= Hummersknott Academy =

Coordinates: 54.5217°N 1.5940°W

Location
- Edinburgh Drive; Darlington, County Durham, DL3 8AR; England

Information
- Type: Academy
- Motto: "Striving Supporting Succeeding"
- Established: 1955
- Local authority: Borough of Darlington
- Department for Education URN: 136838 Tables
- Ofsted: Reports
- Head teacher: Grant Sowerby
- Gender: Mixed
- Age: 11 to 16
- Enrolment: 1228
- Houses: 5 INC: Stephenson, Quaker, Wyvern, Ketton and Cuthbert
- Colours: 5 INC: Red, Yellow, Green, Purple and Blue
- Telephone: +44 (0)1325 241191
- Fax: +44 (0)1325 241122
- Website: www.hummersknott.org.uk

Hummersknott Academy is a secondary school in Darlington in the north east of England. It has approximately 1,250 pupils aged eleven to sixteen.

It has had specialist Language College status since 2005.

== History ==
The school began as the Darlington High School, a girls' grammar school, in 1885. This school moved to new premises in 1955, officially opened by the Duke of Edinburgh on 15 November 1955. In 1968 it was reorganised by the then Darlington County Borough to form one of six 11–16 co-educational comprehensive schools, with the Boys' Grammar School becoming a sixth form college nearer the town centre and near to the College of Technology, now known as QE (Queen Elizabeth).

=== New build ===
In July 2007 a £15 million scheme to demolish and replace some school buildings and renovate others was initiated. The bulk of the funding was provided by national government, with the local council providing £2.7m and the school £0.7m. Work began on the school building during the summer of 2007, although plans for the new design were drawn up a year earlier. The work was completed in 2010 and the refurbished school was 'reopened' by the Duke of Gloucester in September 2010. The main hall was refurbished and new lighting and stage area was included in the refurbishment.

=== Academy Trust ===
The school became a self-governing academy, under the name Hummersknott Academy on 1 July 2011. It is operated by the Hummersknott Academy Trust, a company limited by guarantee.

On 1 February 2013, the Hummersknott Academy Trust was reconstituted as a multi-academy trust when it took over the newly formed Skerne Park Academy (a converting primary school) in the town.

In January 2023 it was announced that a multi-academy trust in County Durham had bought the school; the deal was completed in September 2023.

=== House and college reform ===
Originally, when a grammar school for girls, the school had six houses into which all pupils were distributed and these houses competed against each other in sporting and music competitions for the House Shield. The shields of each house can be seen above the doorways on the front of the school building. These houses were: Barrett, Bede, Caedmon, Carroll, St Hild and Wycliffe. The house system was changed in the late 1980s and the school then had four houses: Dunelm, Edinburgh, Starmer and Trinity. In July 2006 these were replaced by a system of colleges.

== Notable alumni ==
- Jenny Chapman, Former Darlington MP
- Philippa Langley, discovered the remains of Richard III in a car park in Leicester in 2012
- James Morrison, footballer
