= Old Town Hall and Market Hall, Darlington =

Municipal building in Darlington, County Durham, England

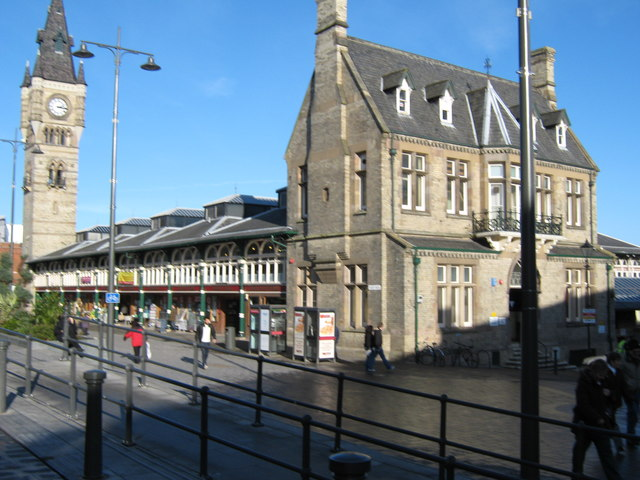
- Old town hall (in the foreground), Market Hall (in the middle ground) and Clock Tower (in the background)

- Shown in County Durham
- 54.5246°N 1.5550°W
- Location: Darlington

History
- Built: 1864

Site notes
- Architect: Alfred Waterhouse
- Architectural style: Gothic style

Listed Building – Grade II
- Official name: The Old Town Hall
- Designated: 6 September 1977
- Reference no.: 1121276

Listed Building – Grade II
- Official name: The Market Building
- Designated: 6 September 1977
- Reference no.: 1322944

Listed Building – Grade II
- Official name: Clock Tower
- Designated: 6 September 1977
- Reference no.: 1121224

The Old Town Hall and Market Hall is a municipal complex in West Row in Darlington, County Durham, England. The old town hall was the headquarters of Darlington Borough Council until it moved to the new town hall in Feethams in 1970. The complex consists of three separate buildings, all of which are Grade II listed: the old town hall, the market hall and the clock tower.

== History ==
The first town hall was built at the junction of Tubwell Row and Prebend Row and opened in 1808. After the first town hall became too cramped, civic leaders decided to procure a new town hall, market place and clock tower; the site they selected had been occupied by a building known as the Shambles in the Market Square.

The new complex was designed by Alfred Waterhouse in the Gothic style. The design for the town hall involved a symmetrical main frontage with five bays facing onto the Horse Market; the central bay featured a doorway with a pointed arch on the ground floor, a cast iron balcony and an oriel window on the first floor and a steep hip roof above. The market hall consisted of five bays facing West Row with stalls selling produce on the ground floor and glazed arcading on the first floor, while the clock tower, located at the north east corner of the complex, was a prominent seven-stage structure with a four-face clock and bartizans, which had been presented to the town by the railway pioneer, Joseph Pease.

A flaw in the casting of one of the girders caused it to collapse during construction killing a local farmer, Robert Robson, at the annual show of the Northern Counties Fat Cattle and Poultry Society which was being held in the partly completed market hall in December 1863. The complex was built by Randal Stap from London at a cost of £7,815 and brought into use, without any official opening, on 2 May 1864. The clock was designed and made by Cooke's of York and the five bells were made by John Warner & Sons. King George V and Queen Mary attended a reception at the old town hall in 1913. Queen Elizabeth II, accompanied by the Duke of Edinburgh, also visited the old town hall and waved to the crowds from the town hall steps on 27 October 1967.

After Waterhouse's town hall also became inadequate, the council moved a new town hall in May 1970. The old town hall was subsequently used as an integral part of the market hall.
