= Firth Moor =

Coordinates: 54.516°N 1.525°W

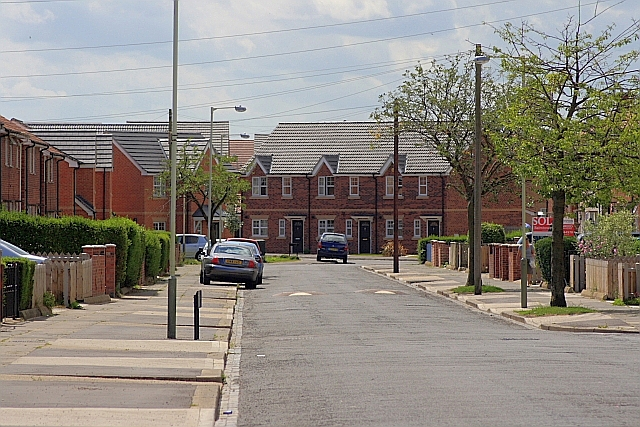
- Estoril Road South

- Location within County Durham
- OS grid reference: NZ308135
- Unitary authority: Darlington
- Ceremonial county: County Durham
- Region: North East
- Country: England
- Sovereign state: United Kingdom
- Post town: DARLINGTON
- Postcode district: DL1
- Police: Durham
- Fire: County Durham and Darlington
- Ambulance: North East

Firth Moor, or Firthmoor is an area in the borough of Darlington and the ceremonial county of County Durham, England. It is situated to the south-east of Darlington town centre.
