= Skerne Park =

Coordinates: 54.510°N 1.553°W

- Location within County Durham
- OS grid reference: NZ290128
- Unitary authority: Darlington
- Ceremonial county: County Durham
- Region: North East
- Country: England
- Sovereign state: United Kingdom
- Post town: DARLINGTON
- Postcode district: DL1
- Dialling code: 01325
- Police: Durham
- Fire: County Durham and Darlington
- Ambulance: North East

Skerne Park is a predominantly council owned housing estate in the southern part of the borough of Darlington and the ceremonial county of County Durham, England. It is situated on the southern edge of Darlington. Skerne Park comprises streets named after well-known British rivers, such as Tweed Place, Severn Way and Tyne Crescent, partly because the estate is built near the River Skerne. Skerne Park has been recently renewed, and is a minute's walk away from The South Park. In Skerne Park, there is a Londis Newsagent Store, a Post Office and A Kebab House, there is also a popular primary school serving the local area.

The estate recently had a new housing development built and is still undergoing construction, there is also a park being built.

== Education ==
Skerne Park Primary School was built in the 1960s and in 2006 was refurbished at a cost of around £4.1 million.

Skerne Park Primary School is adjacent to the Coleridge Centre which was Built in 2005 and opened in February 2006. Facilities in the Coleridge Centre include: Parkside Nursery, Darlington Borough Council's Home Education Service, SureStart Centre and Darlington Learning and Skills Service; run by the Council offering vocational training to young people and adults as well as Apprenticeship training programmes.
