= Longfield Academy, Darlington =

Longfield Academy

Location
- Longfield Road; Darlington; County Durham, DL3 0HT; England
- Coordinates: 54.54827°N 1.55422°W

Information
- Type: Academy
- Local authority: Darlington Borough Council
- Trust: Northern Arch Learning Partnership
- Department for Education URN: 145577 Tables
- Ofsted: Reports
- Chair: Nicola Bales
- Headteacher: Angela Sweeten
- Staff: 69
- Gender: Coeducational
- Age: 11 to 16
- Capacity: 900
- Website: longfield.nalp.org.uk

Longfield Academy (formerly Longfield Comprehensive School, Longfield Academy of Sport) is a coeducational secondary school located in Darlington, County Durham, England.

Previously a community school administered by Darlington Borough Council, Longfield School converted to academy status in August 2011 and was renamed Longfield Academy. However, the school continues to coordinate with Darlington Borough Council for admissions.

Longfield Academy offers GCSEs and BTECs as programmes of study for pupils. Due to once being a sports academy, the school has built up sports facilities, and hires out these facilities for use by the local community.
