= Darlington =

Town in County Durham, England

Coordinates: 54.5270°N 1.5526°W

- Town
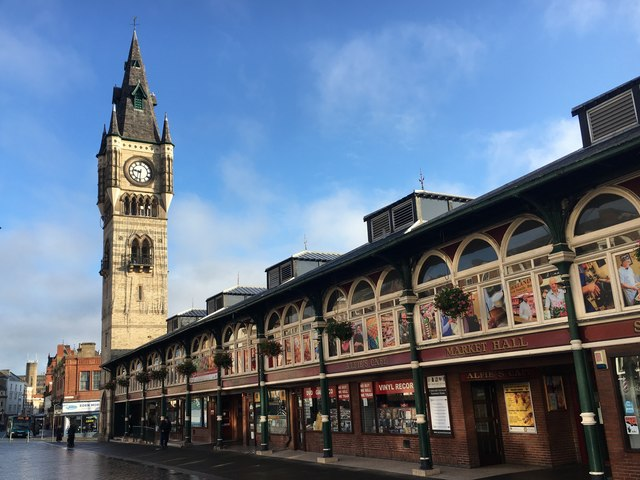
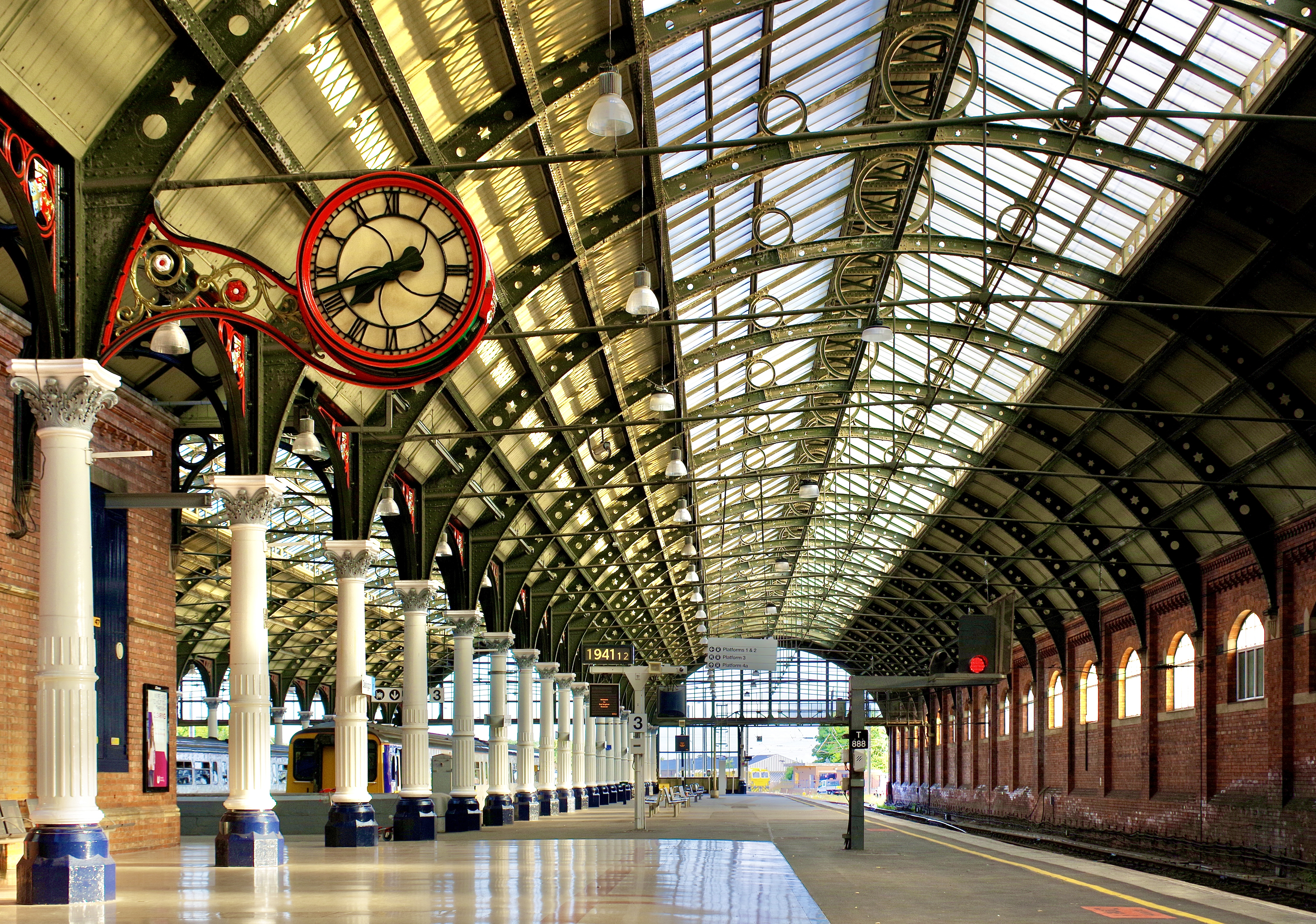
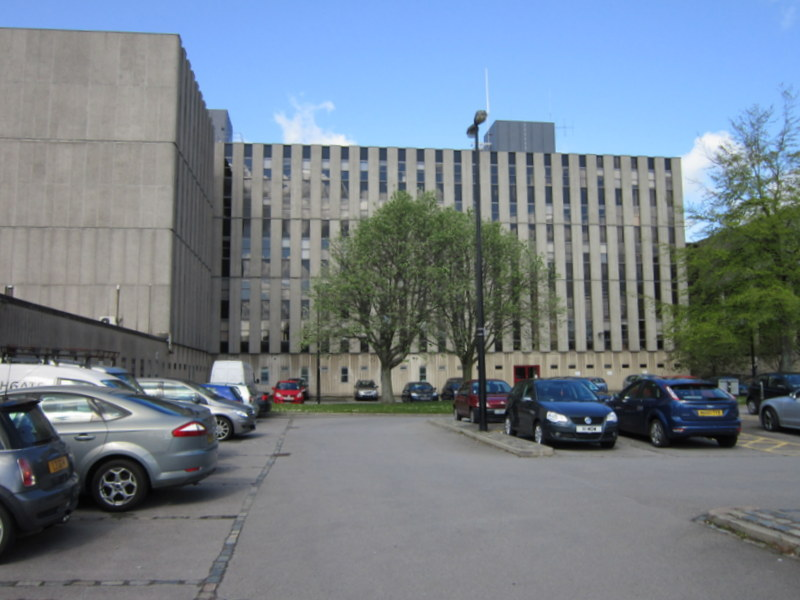
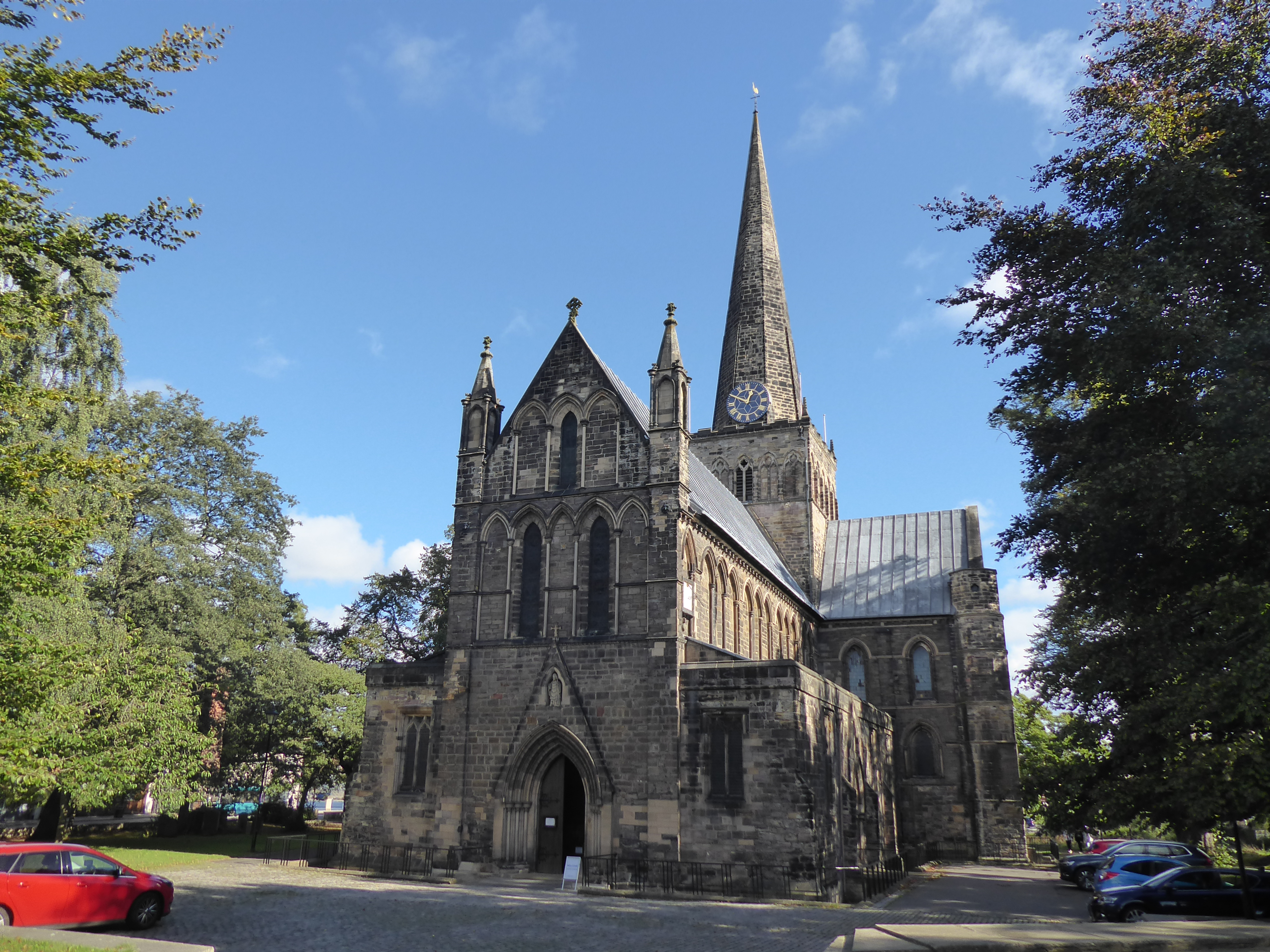
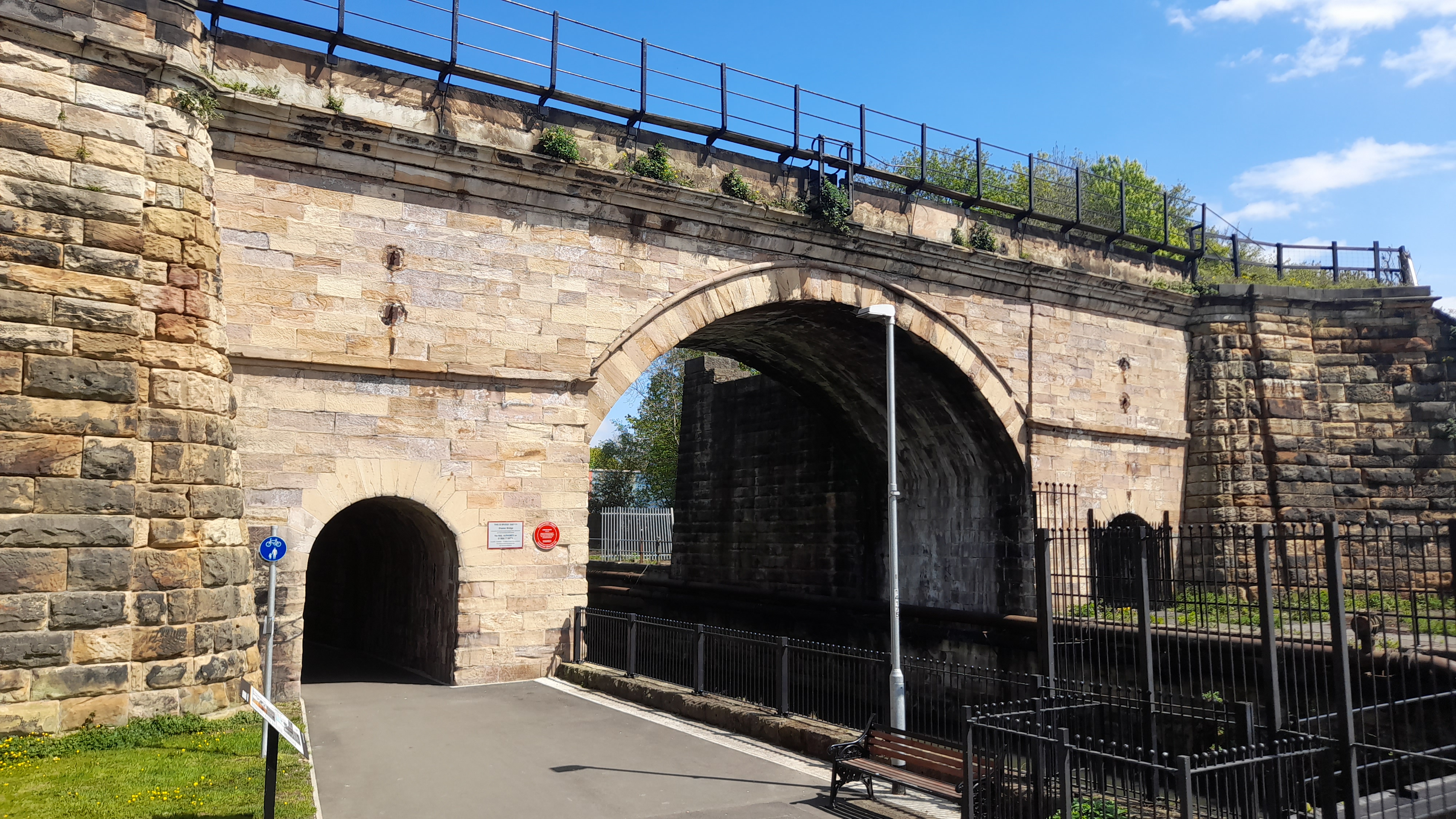
- Market Hall and Clock Tower Railway Station Town Hall St Cuthbert's Church Skerne Bridge

- Location within County Durham
- Area: 19.73 km^{2} (7.62 sq mi)
- Population: 107,800
  - Density: 4,680.81/km^{2} (12,123.25/sq mi) (Town)
- OS grid reference: NZ289147
  - London: 219 mi (352 km) south
- Unitary authority: Darlington
- Ceremonial county: County Durham
- Region: North East
- Country: England
- Sovereign state: United Kingdom
- Areas of the town: List: Blackwell; Branksome; Cockerton; Faverdale; Firthmoor; Hummersknott; Mowden; Skerne Park; The Denes; West Park
- Post town: DARLINGTON
- Postcode district: DL1, DL2, DL3
- Dialling code: 01325
- Police: Durham
- Fire: County Durham and Darlington
- Ambulance: North East
- UK Parliament: Darlington
- Website: www.darlington.gov.uk

Darlington is a market town in the Borough of Darlington, County Durham, England. It lies on the River Skerne, 13 miles (21 km) west of Middlesbrough and 17 miles (27 km) south of Durham. Darlington had a population of 107,800 in the 2021 Census, making it a "large town" and one of the largest settlements in North East England. The town is linked to London, Leeds, York, Newcastle and Edinburgh by the East Coast Main Line railway and the A1(M) motorway.

== History ==
=== Darlington ===
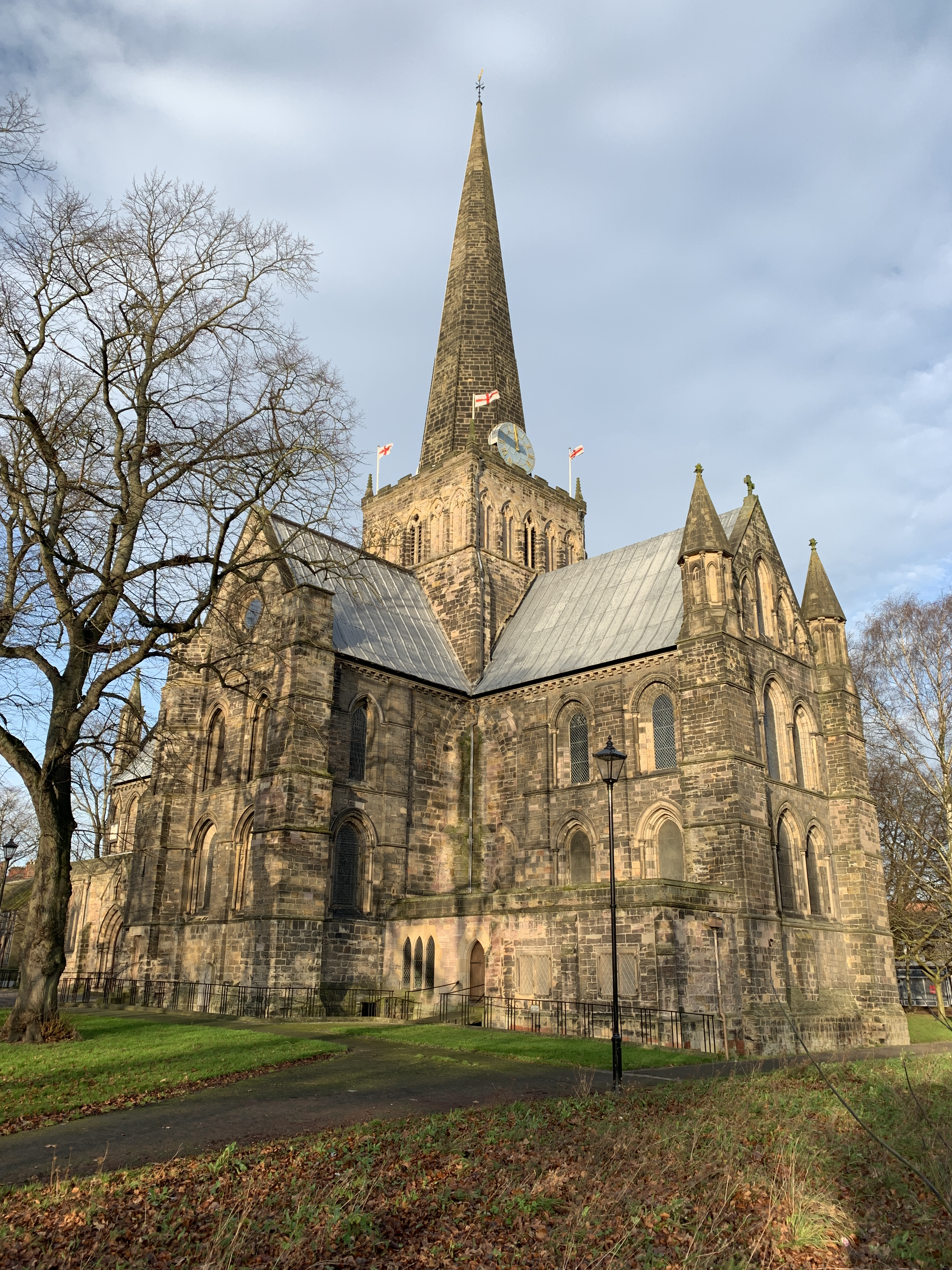
St Cuthbert's Church

Darlington started as an Anglo-Saxon settlement. The name derives from the Anglo-Saxon Dearthington, which seemingly meant 'the settlement of Deornoth's people' but, by Norman times, the name had changed to Derlinton. During the 17th and 18th centuries, the town was usually known by the name of Darnton.

In 1003, Darlington became part of the patrimony of St Cuthbert. St Cuthbert's Church, built in 1183, is one of the most important early English churches in the north of England and is Grade I listed. The oldest church in Darlington is St Andrew's Church, built around 1100 in Haughton-le-Skerne.

Darlington has a historic market area in the town centre. In 1540, John Leland described Darlington as 'the best market town in the bishopric, saving Duresme' (Durham)

When the author Daniel Defoe visited the town during the 18th century, he noted that it was eminent for "good bleaching of linen, so that I have known cloth brought from Scotland to be bleached here". However, he also disparaged the town, writing that it had "nothing remarkable but dirt"; roads would have typically been unpaved in the 18th century.

The so-called Durham Ox came from Darlington; born in the early 19th century, this steer became renowned for its excellent proportions which came to inform the standard for Shorthorn cattle.

=== Victorian era ===
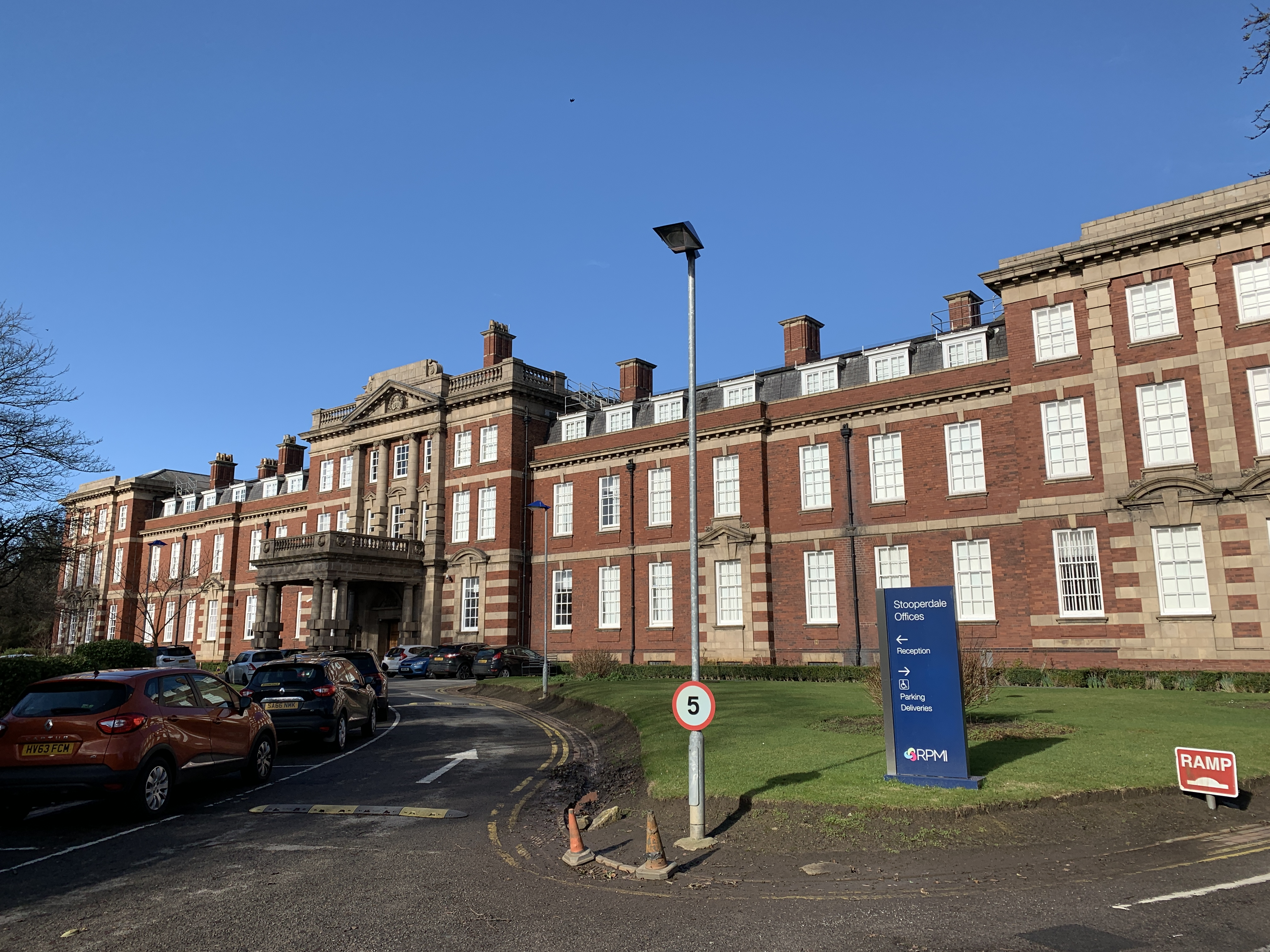
Stooperdale Offices (built for the North Eastern Railway Company)

During the early 19th century, Darlington remained a small market town.

The Stockton and Darlington Railway ran steam locomotives designed for passengers and goods, built to a standard gauge, on a permanent main line with branches. On 27 September 1825, George Stephenson's engine, Locomotion No. 1, travelled between Shildon and Stockton-on-Tees via Darlington, an event that was seen as ushering in the modern railway age.

The population at the time of the 1841 census was 11,008.

Later in the 19th century, the town became an important centre for railway manufacturing. An early railway works was the Hopetown Carriage Works (est. 1853), which supplied carriages and locomotives to the Stockton and Darlington Railway. The engineering firm of William and Alfred Kitching also manufactured locomotives there around this time. The town eventually developed three significant railway works:

- The largest of these was the main line Darlington Works; its main factory, the North Road Shops, opened in 1863 and remained in operation until 1966.
- Robert Stephenson & Co. (colloquially: "Stivvies"), moved to Darlington from Newcastle upon Tyne in 1902. It was renamed Robert Stephensons & Hawthorns in 1937, was absorbed by English Electric around 1960 and had closed by 1964.
- Faverdale Wagon Works was established in 1923 and closed in 1962; in the 1950s, it was a UK pioneer in applying mass-production techniques to the manufacture of railway goods wagons.

==== Quakers and the Echo ====
During the 19th century, Darlington Quaker families such as those of Pease and Backhouse emerged as major employers and philanthropists. Industrialist Joseph Pease gave Darlington its landmark clock tower in 1864. The clock face was crafted by T. Cooke & Sons of York, and bells cast by John Warner & Sons of nearby Norton-on-Tees. The bells are sisters to Big Ben.

Darlington Mechanics Institute was opened in 1854 by Elizabeth Pease Nichol, who had donated towards its cost. In 1853, South Park was laid out, over 91 acres (37 ha), with financial support from the Backhouse family.

Architect Alfred Waterhouse, famous for work including London's Natural History Museum and Manchester Town Hall, designed Darlington's Grade II listed Old Town Hall and Market Hall, Darlington in 1860. Four years later he contributed Backhouse's Bank building that is, as of 2022, a branch of Barclays bank.

During the period, George Gordon Hoskins was responsible for much of the town's architecture, designing buildings such as The King's Head Hotel.

Darlington Free Library, a Grade II listed building in Crown Street, was built for £10,000 by Edward Pease. His daughter, Lady Lymington, opened the building on 23 October 1885 and presented it to the town council who agreed to operate it in perpetuity. As of 2022, it contains a library and "centre for local studies".

In 1870, The Northern Echo newspaper launched. Its most famous editor, William Thomas Stead, died on the Titanic. Facing the present Northern Echo building on Priestgate is the William Stead public house named for him.

=== Wars ===
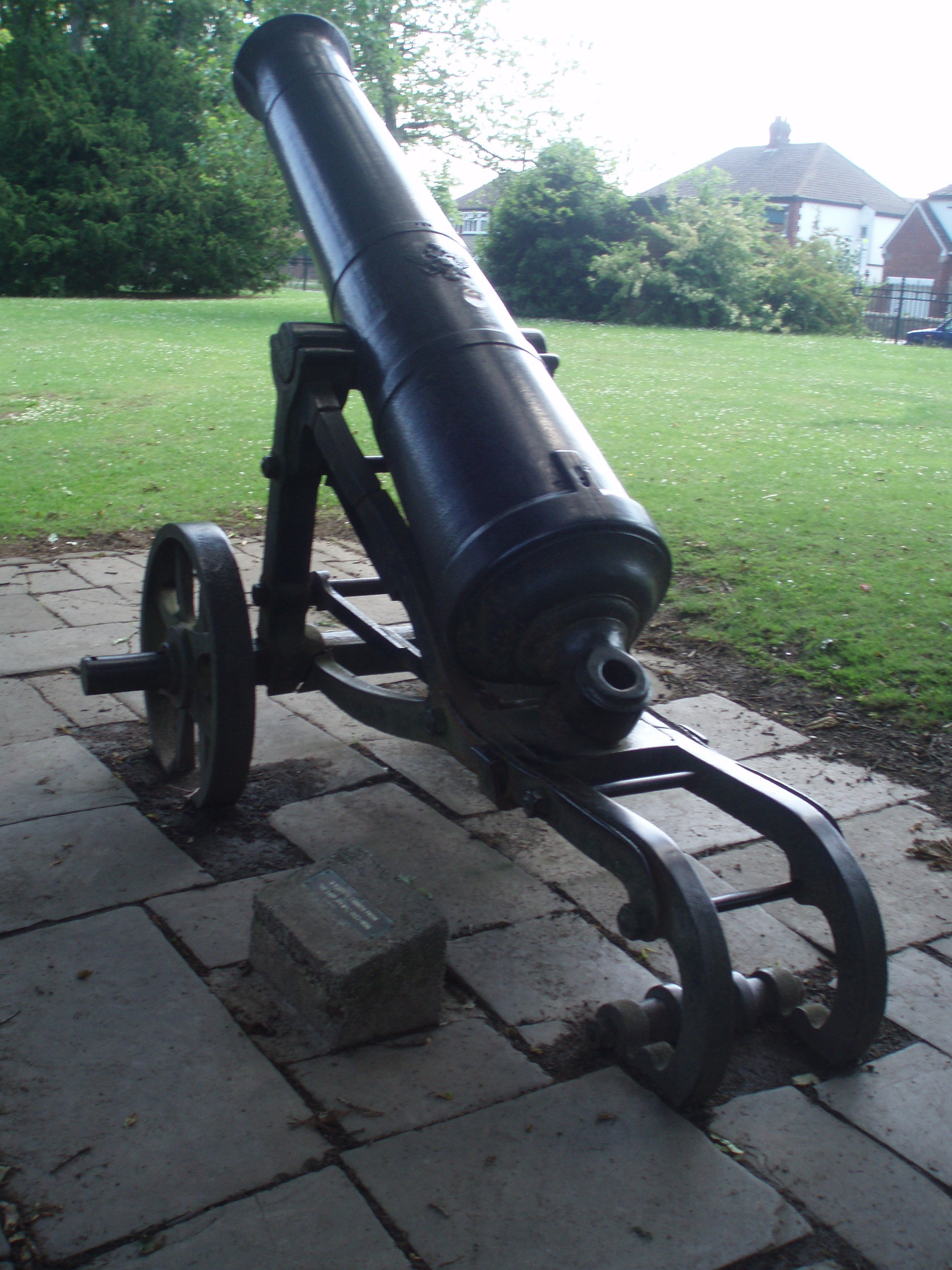
Russian Crimean War Cannon from Sevastopol in South Park

In 1939, Darlington had the most cinema seats per capita in the United Kingdom.

On the night of 13 January 1945, a Lancaster bomber piloted by Pilot Officer William Stuart McMullen of Canada was on a training exercise when one of its engines caught fire and it crashed on farmland near Lingfield Lane. McMullen stayed at the controls while his crew parachuted to safety and directed the stricken aircraft away from the houses below. He was killed on impact. For his actions, Lingfield Lane was renamed "McMullen Road" and a memorial was erected.

=== Tornado and the brick train ===
Starting in 1993, rail enthusiast group A1 Steam Locomotive Trust worked on building an all-new steam locomotive, the first to be constructed since the 1960s. It was intended to be the 50th member of the long withdrawn LNER Peppercorn Class A1 engine, called Tornado and numbered 60163, from scratch in the 1853 former Stockton and Darlington Railway Carriage Works at Hopetown. Many of the original fleet had been built at Darlington locomotive works in the late 1940s. Tornado was completed in January 2008.

To commemorate the town's contribution to the railways, David Mach's 1997 work Train is located alongside the A66, close to the original Stockton–Darlington railway. It is a life-size brick sculpture of a steaming locomotive emerging from a tunnel, made from 185,000 Accrington Nori bricks. The work had a budget of £760,000.

=== 21st century ===
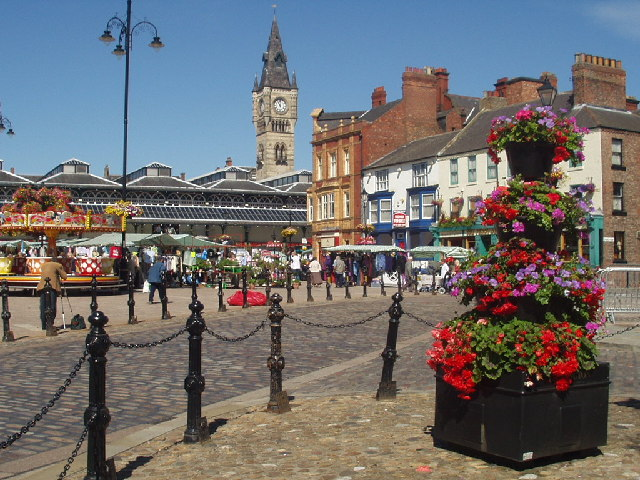
The Market Square in 2004

In 2001, Darlington became the first place in England to allow same-sex civil ceremonies and it hosts an annual Gay Pride Festival at venues across the town, the next scheduled for 8 August 2026. A 2005 Darlington Borough Council project to pedestrianise areas of the town centre, this included some Victorian features along High Row. In August 2008, a fire, in which nobody was killed, caused damage and weeks of closure until the damage was fixed for several shops (including Woolworths). The King's Head Hotel was also affected with damage to the roof and 100 bedrooms, the hotel was able to reopen in 2012.

== Governance ==
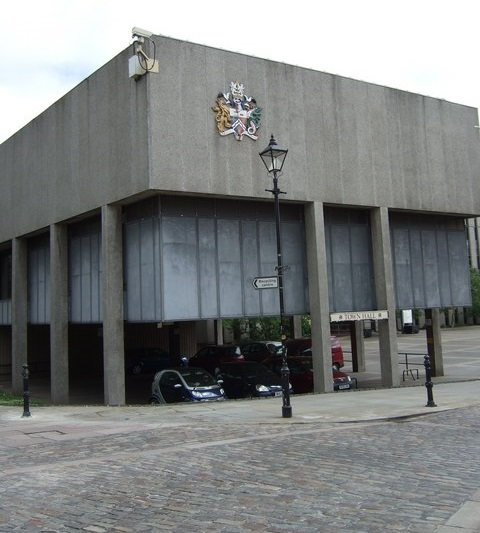
Darlington Town Hall

There is one main tier of local government covering Darlington, at unitary authority level, being Darlington Borough Council. The council is a member of the Tees Valley Combined Authority, led by the directly elected Mayor of Tees Valley. Most of the built-up area of Darlington is an unparished area, although some outer parts of the urban area now extend into neighbouring parishes. The council is based at Darlington Town Hall on Feethams in the centre of Darlington.

Darlington was an ancient parish. It was historically divided into four townships: Archdeacon Newton, Blackwell, Cockerton, and a Darlington township covering the town itself and adjoining areas. Such townships also became civil parishes in 1866. A body of improvement commissioners was established in 1823 to provide infrastructure to the more built-up parts of the Darlington township. The commissioners were superseded in 1850 when the whole Darlington township was made a local board district, governed by an elected local board.

The local board was in turn replaced when Darlington was incorporated as a municipal borough in 1867. The borough boundaries were enlarged on several occasions, notably absorbing the Harrowgate Hill area from the parish of Haughton-le-Skerne in 1872, Cockerton in 1915, Haughton-le-Skerne in 1930 and Blackwell in 1967. In 1915 the borough was elevated to become a county borough, taking over county-level functions from Durham County Council.

The borough was substantially enlarged in 1974 to take in most of the surrounding Darlington Rural District, such that the modern borough of Darlington covers both the town and a surrounding rural hinterland. The enlarged borough was also reconstituted as a non-metropolitan district as part of the 1974 reforms, with Durham County Council once more providing county-level services to the town. The borough was made a unitary authority on 1 April 1997, regaining its independence from the county council. The borough remains part of County Durham for ceremonial purposes.

Since 2016, the council has been a member of the Tees Valley Combined Authority along with Hartlepool, Middlesbrough, Redcar and Cleveland and Stockton-on-Tees. Unlike Darlington, the other four districts in the combined authority had all been part of the short-lived county of Cleveland between 1974 and 1996.

As of 2024, the Member of Parliament (MP) for the Darlington constituency is Labour's Lola McEvoy. Former members of parliament for the town include Peter Gibson, Jenny Chapman, Alan Milburn (the former Secretary of State for Health under Tony Blair's Labour government) and Michael Fallon (who was Secretary of State for Defence under David Cameron's coalition government and Theresa May's Conservative government).

== Geography ==
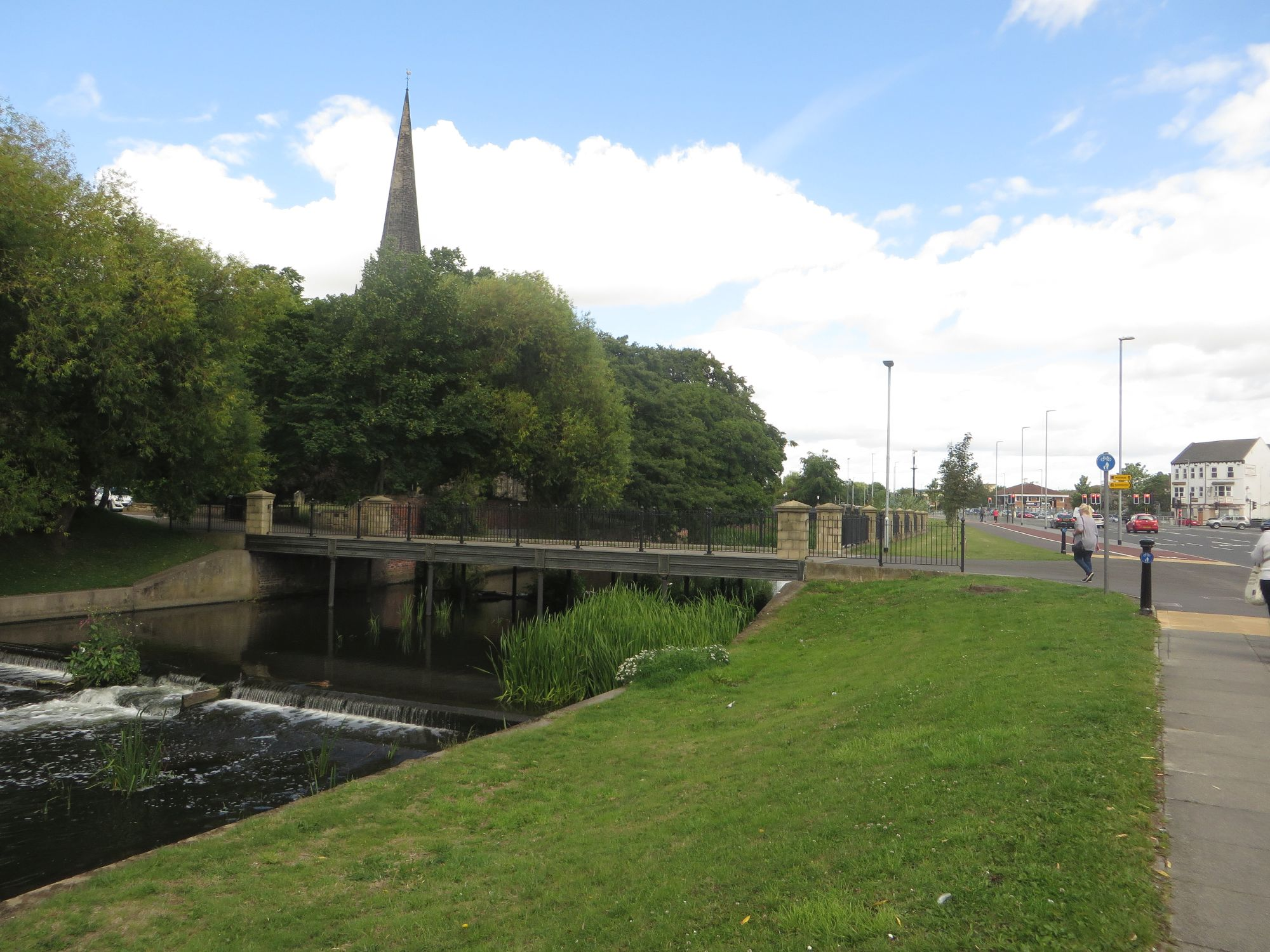
The River Skerne just east of the town centre and the spire of St Cuthbert's Church

Darlington is located in the south of County Durham close to the River Tees, which acts as the border between Durham and Yorkshire. Both the River Tees and River Skerne pass through the borough, the Skerne later joining the Tees which then flows east and into the North Sea. Due to river bifurcation at the Baydale Beck and Cocker Beck, which later flow into the Tees and Skerne respectively, much of the western side of Darlington forms a river island.

=== Areas within the borough ===
In the north are Harrowgate, Coatham Mundeville and Beaumont Hill and to the north-east are Whinfield and Haughton Le Skerne. To the east is the suburb of Eastbourne and Red Hall with Firthmoor and Skerne Park to the south. Situated in the west end are Hummersknott, Mowden and Blackwell. Finally, to the north-west are Branksome, Cockerton, Faverdale, The Denes, West Park, High Grange and Pierremont which is associated with the notable Henry Pease (MP).

=== Distance to nearby towns ===
Place	Distance	Direction	Relation
Hartlepool	18 miles (29 km)	North East	Combined Authority area
Durham	17 miles (27 km)	North	Historic county town and closest city
Middlesbrough	13 miles (21 km)	East	Combined Authority area
Stockton-on-Tees	10 miles (16 km)	East	Combined Authority area

== Economy ==
The trend of regional gross value added of Darlington at current basic prices published (pp. 240–253) by the Office for National Statistics, with figures in £ millions.

Year	Regional Gross Value Added (Note: Components may not sum to totals due to rounding.)	Agriculture (Note: Includes hunting and forestry)	Industry (Note: Includes energy and construction)	Services (Note: Includes financial intermediation services indirectly measured)
1995	1,115	8	377	729
2000	1,192	6	417	768
2003	1,538	6	561	971

Finance and manufacturing are now the main elements of its economy.

=== Government and service sector ===
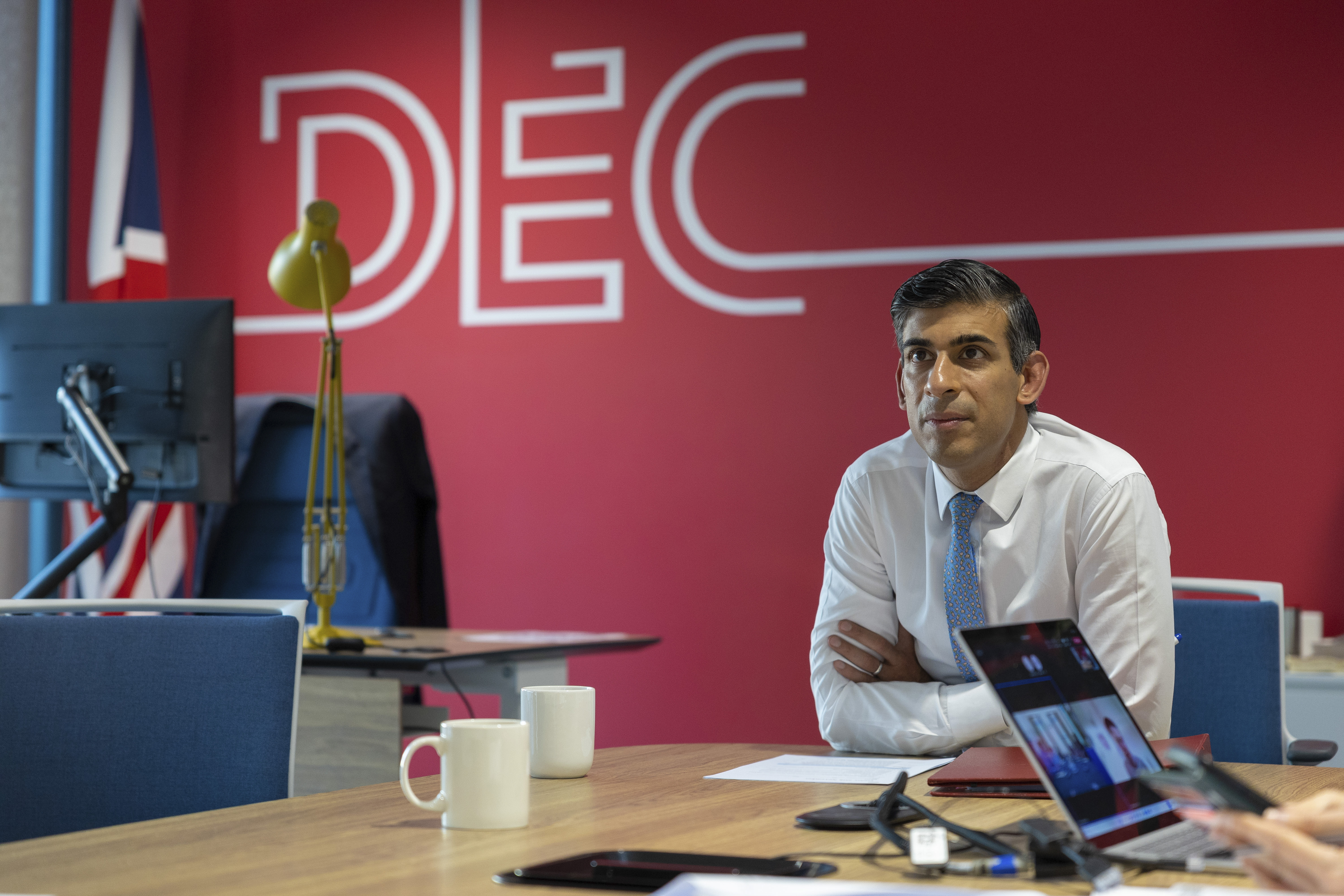
Prime Minister Rishi Sunak working at DEC in 2022

Several UK Government departments are represented at the Darlington Economic Campus (DEC) which opened in 2021 at its temporary home in Feethams House.

The English division of the Student Loans Company, Student Finance England, is based at Lingfield Point and employs over 1,000 people.

Darlington Borough Council announced that the site for the DL1 complex, previously a car park for Darlington Town Hall, was also to be redeveloped to house riverside office space for the Department for Education to replace its previous office on the edge of the town in Mowden, in an effort to safeguard Darlington jobs. This was officially opened on 19 March 2015. The Disclosure and Barring Service has a national office in the town.

Amazon UK operates a warehouse facility, which opened in early 2020, employing 1,300 full-time staff, one of the town's biggest employers.

EE is the largest private sector employer in the town, with 2,500 staff. The company took over its operations from one of its predecessors, Orange Mobile.

=== Morton Park ===
The Morton Park area of Darlington is currently undergoing a partial redevelopment, with areas of unused waste land being redeveloped into modern industrial and office space. Other commercial spaces in Darlington include North Road Industrial Estate, Cleveland Trading Estate and Faverdale Industrial Estate. The council depot on Central Park is also to be redeveloped into commercial space.

=== Engineering ===
Darlington has a rich engineering heritage and several notable engineering firms established locally. Bridge building was particularly important in the town. Bridges built in Darlington span the River Nile and Amazon.

Local engineering firms include:

- Cummins has an engine building facility near Morton Park.
- AMEC's industrial arm is headquartered in the town
- Darlington Forge Company originated in the town, c. 1967
- Whessoe originated in Darlington.

=== Retail and leisure ===
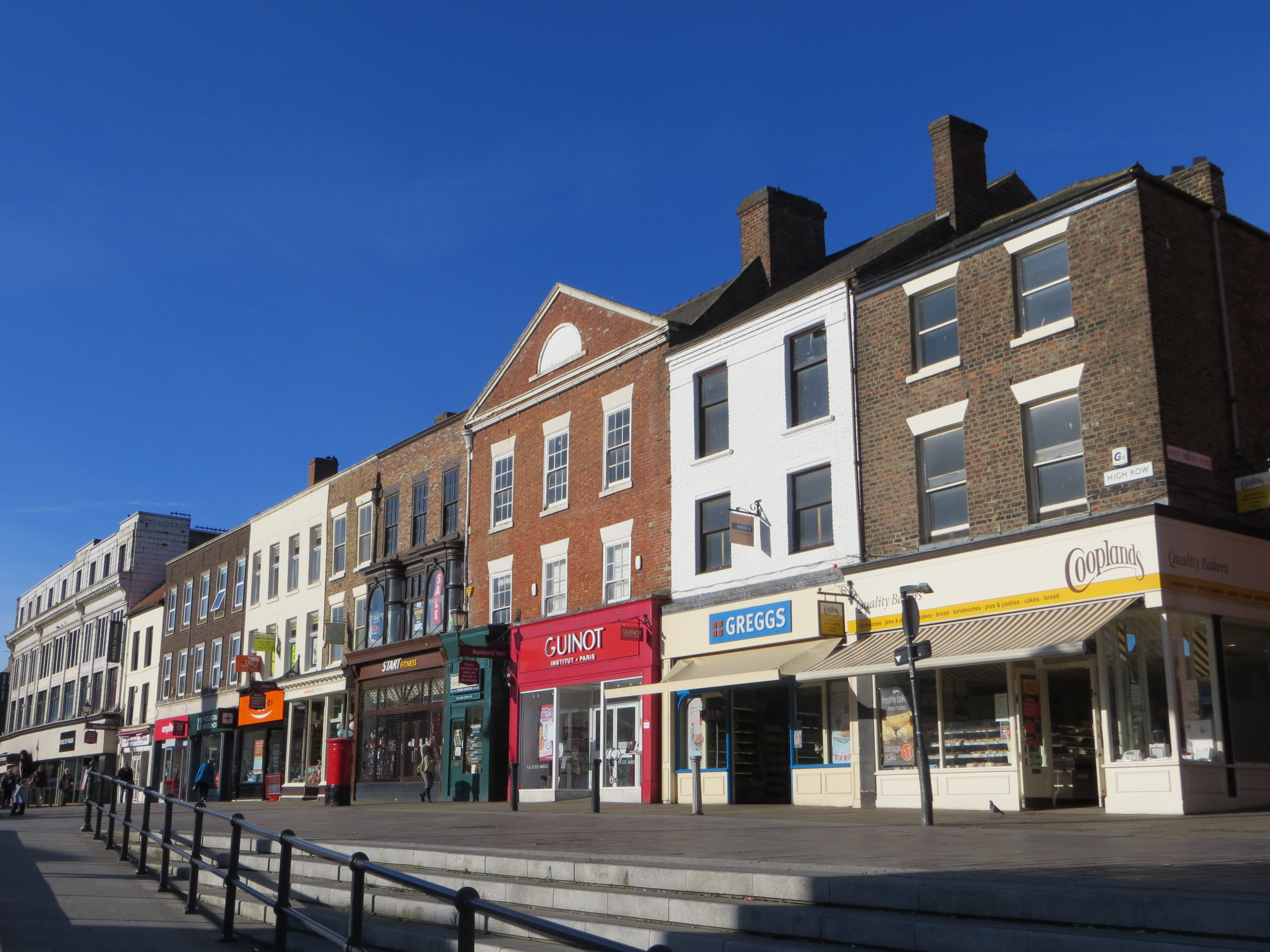
Shops in the main square

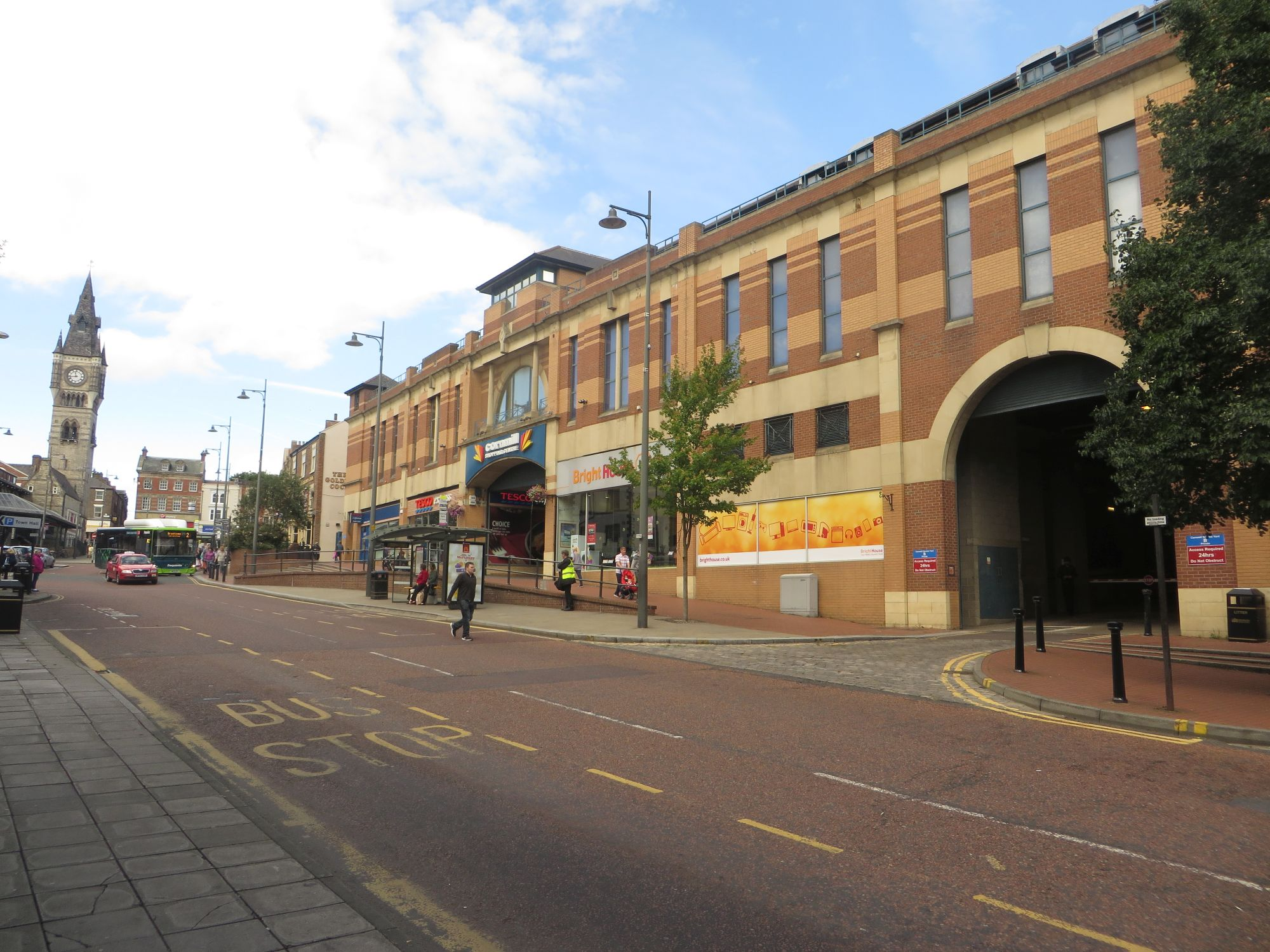
The Cornmill Centre

As an historic market town, a weekly outdoor market was held on the market square, which is one of the biggest in the country. An indoor market is located underneath the town clock on Prebend Row.

Retailers in the area include:

- Prebend Row hosts the Cornmill Shopping centre
- Grange Road and Skinnergate has a number of independent shops
- Duke Street houses art galleries and restaurants
- Argos, a UK retail company, has its largest warehouse distribution centre in the North of England located in Darlington; it is sited within the Faverdale Industrial Estate, in the north-west of the town.

In November 2012, a deal was signed between Darlington Borough Council and developer Terrace Hill for a £30 million re-development of the site of the former Feethams bus depot. The proposal had an expected completion date of late 2014, though this did overrun with completion early 2016.

=== Hospitals ===
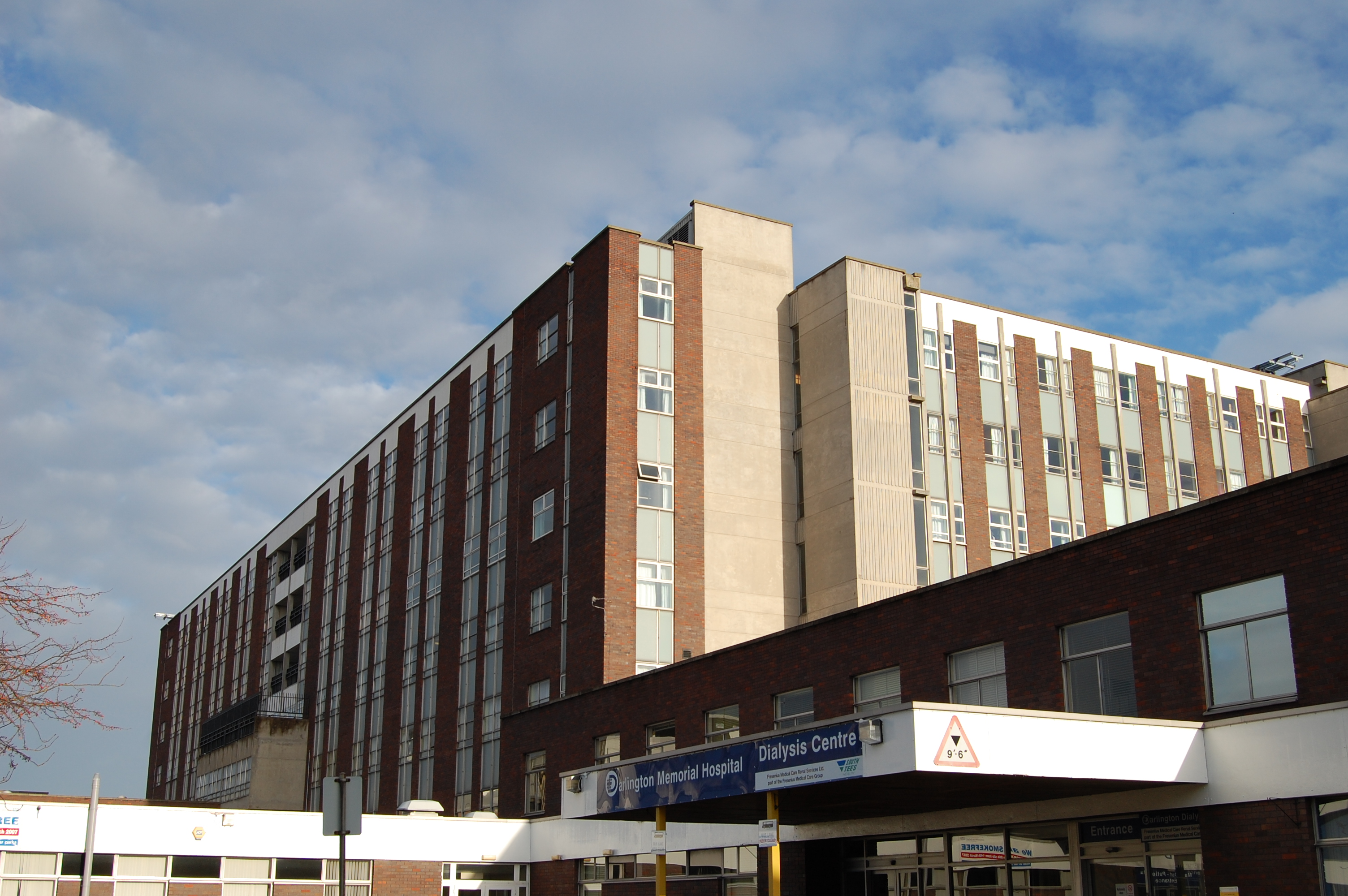
Darlington memorial hospital

Darlington Memorial Hospital is on Hollyhurst Road, in the corridor between Woodland Road and The Denes. The private Woodlands Hospital is at Morton Park.

== Culture and landmarks ==
Buildings of Darlington
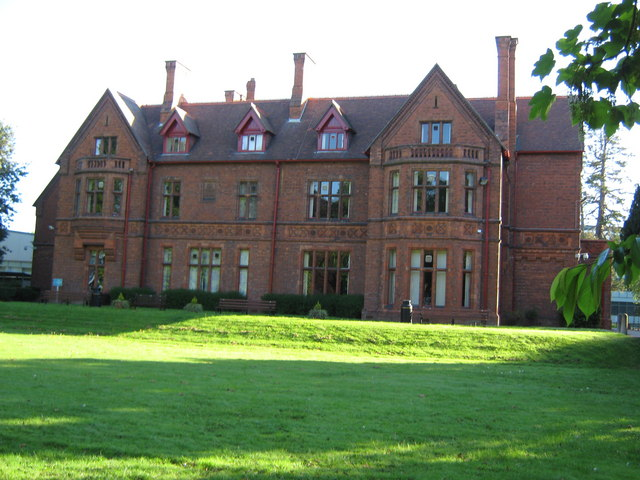
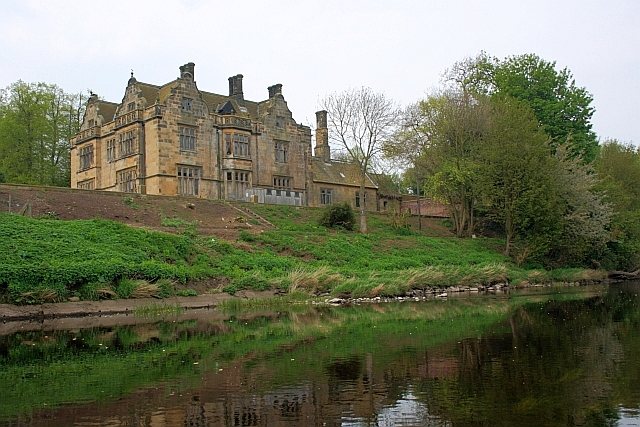
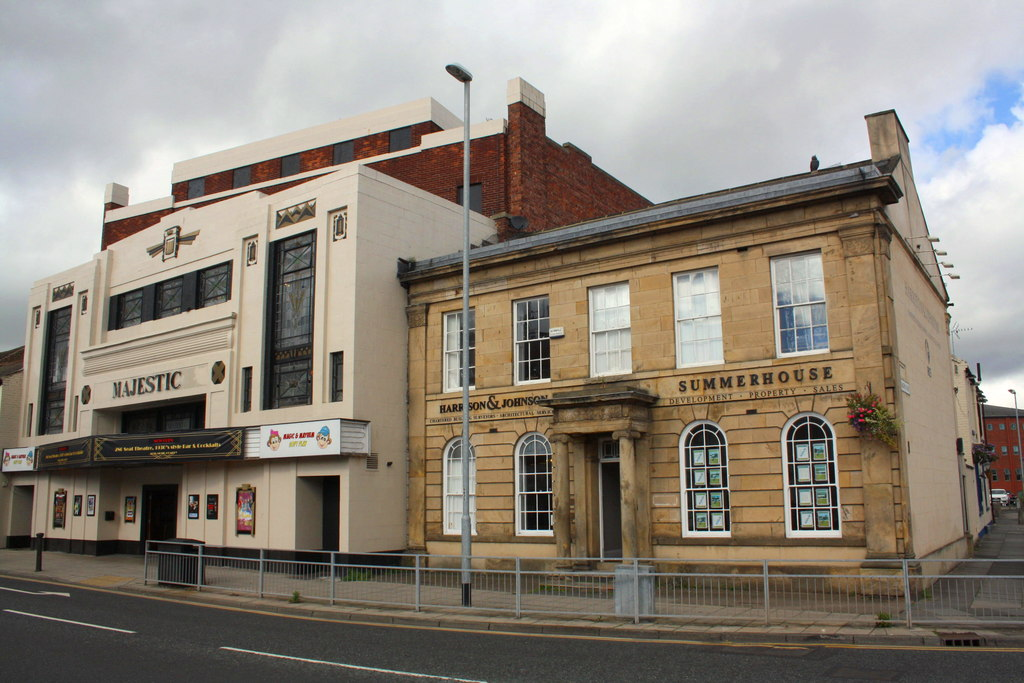
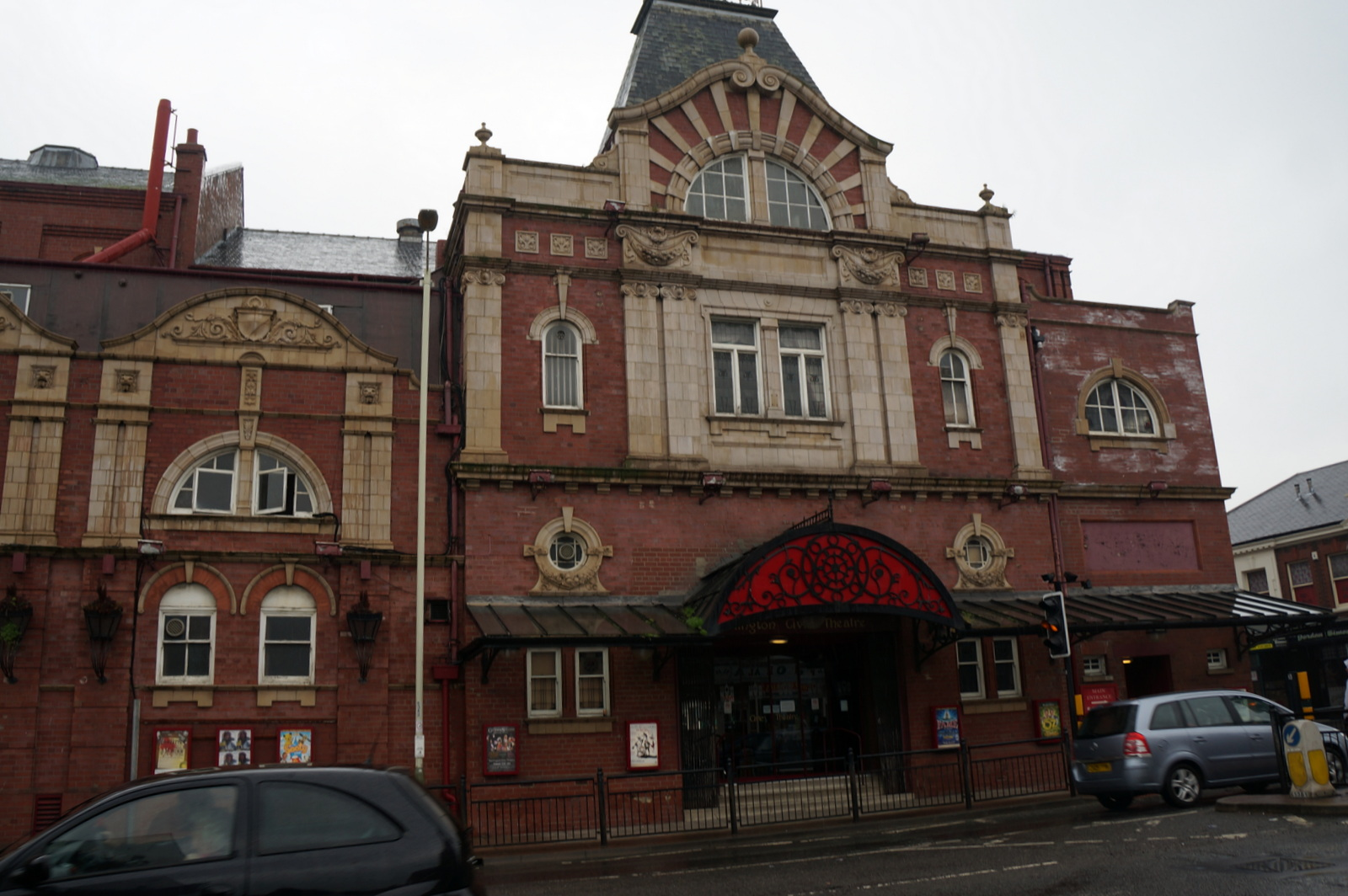
Landmarks from top left to bottom right:
Mowden Hall, Sockburn Hall, the Majestic Theatre (left of the photo) and the Hippodrome theatre

=== Theatre ===
The former Civic Theatre, now The Hippodrome, is a popular arts venue in the town, hosting a mix of musicals, dramas, plays and pantomimes. In 2016, Darlington Civic Theatre closed to mark the start of a £12.3 million renovation project that included a £4.5 million lottery grant from the Heritage Lottery Fund and revamped as The Hippodrome and connects to the children's theatre Hullabaloo.

=== Friends' Meeting House ===
The Friends' Meeting House in Skinnergate is a Grade II* listed building. The Friends (Quakers) have met on this site since 1678, having previously met in private homes. The present building dates mainly from 1846. Upstairs of The Quaker meeting house is home to Artist Lucas Roy. Lucas is an international fine artist who gained credit for his early work dedicated to the NHS during the COVID-19 pandemic.

=== Forum Music Centre ===
The Forum Music Centre, opened in 2004, hosts regular live music events, from Ska and Punk to Indie and Classic Rock. It also runs a comedy club. As well as live music, the facility houses a state of the art recording studio and several rehearsal rooms. The Carmel Rhythm Club, at Carmel College in the Hummersknott end of town, was another music venue. It opened the same year as the Forum.

=== Dog show ===
Darlington Dog Show was a championship event from 1969. It was usually held in September on the showground in South Park; but it has now moved to Ripon.

=== Churches ===
Darlington has a wide array of churches scattered around the town including the iconic and notable parish church of St Cuthbert's in the centre of town, with a towering spire and a grade I listed status. Other churches include Methodist, Baptist, Roman Catholic and Jehovah Witness places of worship, as well as Holy Trinity Church and the grade II listed St John the Evangelist Church which closed for worship in 2023.

=== Mosque ===
The Jamia Mosque and Islamic Society of Darlington is located in the North Lodge Terrace area of the town, an area with a relatively high proportion of ethnic minority residents (39.2% of the population in that area, compared to a town average of 6.3%). Constituted as a charity under UK law in 1982, the mosque offers worship facilities, as well as Islamic education, and has its own telecommunications mast for calls to prayer.

== Transport ==
=== Air ===
Teesside International Airport is located 5 mi (8 km) east of Darlington town centre; it serves County Durham and North Yorkshire. The airport was known as Durham Tees Valley Airport from 2004 until mid-2019. It has flights to a few domestic locations across the UK and international flights to some locations in Europe. Many private or general aviation flights use the airport. The airport has a Fire Training Centre.

The nearest large airports are Newcastle (42 mi (68 km)) and Leeds Bradford (62 mi (100 km)).

=== Railway ===
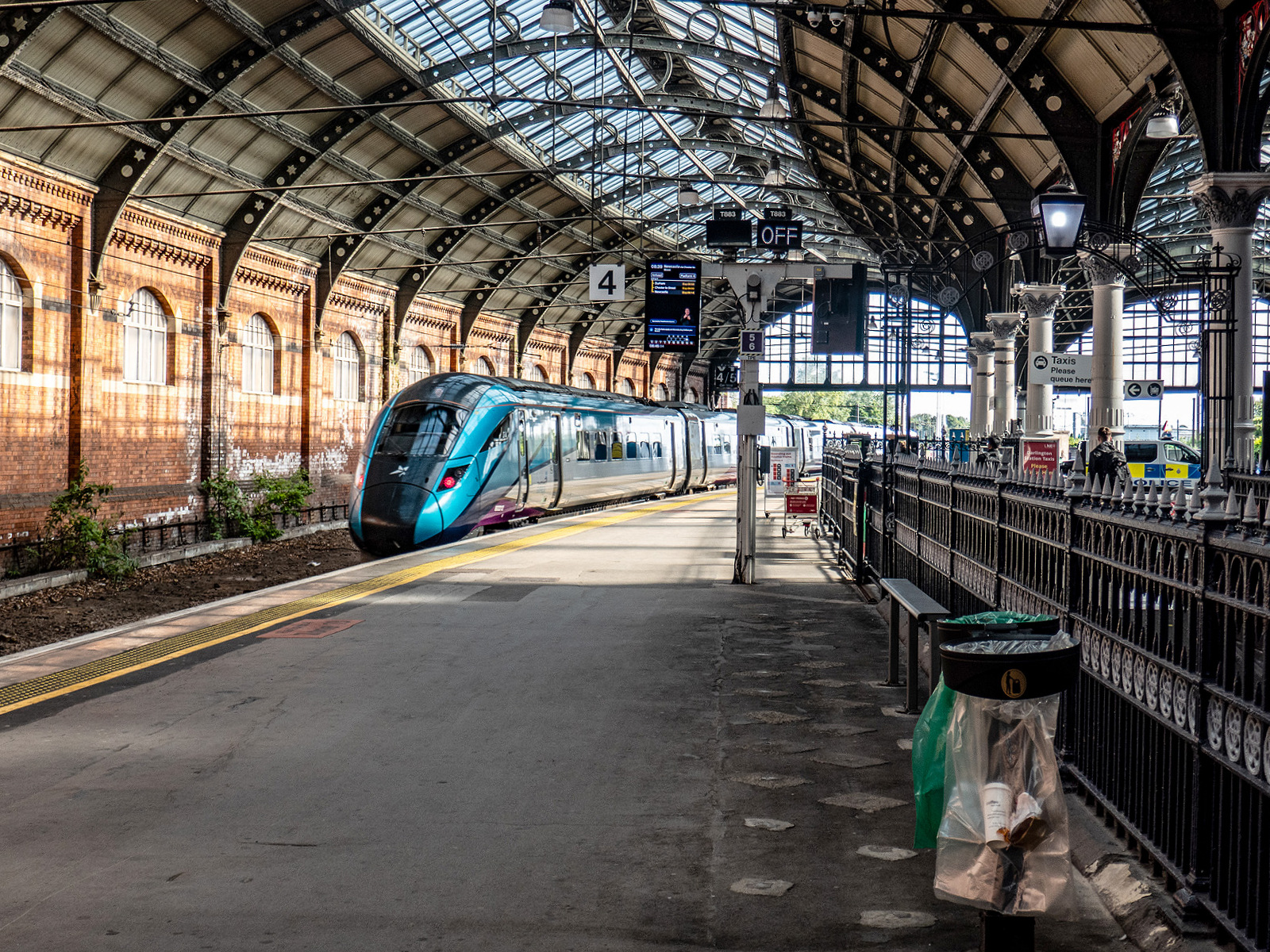
A TransPennine Express service at Darlington station

Darlington railway station is a principal stop on the East Coast Main Line; it is served by four train operating companies:

- London North Eastern Railway operates inter-city services to London Kings Cross, York, Durham, Newcastle, Edinburgh Waverley, Aberdeen and Inverness
- TransPennine Express runs inter-city services between Liverpool Lime Street and Newcastle, via York, Leeds and Manchester Victoria
- CrossCountry operates inter-city services between Edinburgh Waverley, Plymouth and Penzance, via Leeds, Sheffield, Derby, Birmingham New Street and Bristol Temple Meads
- Northern Trains runs local services on the Tees Valley Line, connecting all of the main settlements along the River Tees, including Bishop Auckland, Middlesbrough, Redcar Central and Saltburn. Services also stop at North Road, the town's original station.

Darlington railway station has a large Victorian clock tower, which can be seen from most areas of the town.

=== Roads ===
Darlington is well connected to the North East's major trunk route, the A1(M), which bypasses the town to the west. It was completed in 1965, replacing the Great North Road route which is now known as the A167. The town is served by three closely-spaced junctions of the A1(M): junctions 57 (A66(M)), 58 (A68) and 59 (A167), which is also the access exit for Darlington motorway services (Newton Park), with an on-site filling station, hotel and restaurant.

The town is also close to other major trunk routes, including the A66 trans-Pennine route connecting Darlington to Stockton-on-Tees and the A19.

The £5.9 million 5 mi (8 km) A66 Darlington eastern bypass opened on 25 November 1985. The Darlington Eastern Transport Corridor, linking the Central Park regeneration zone (Haughton Road) and Darlington town centre to a new roundabout on the A66, was opened in the summer of 2008.

=== Buses ===
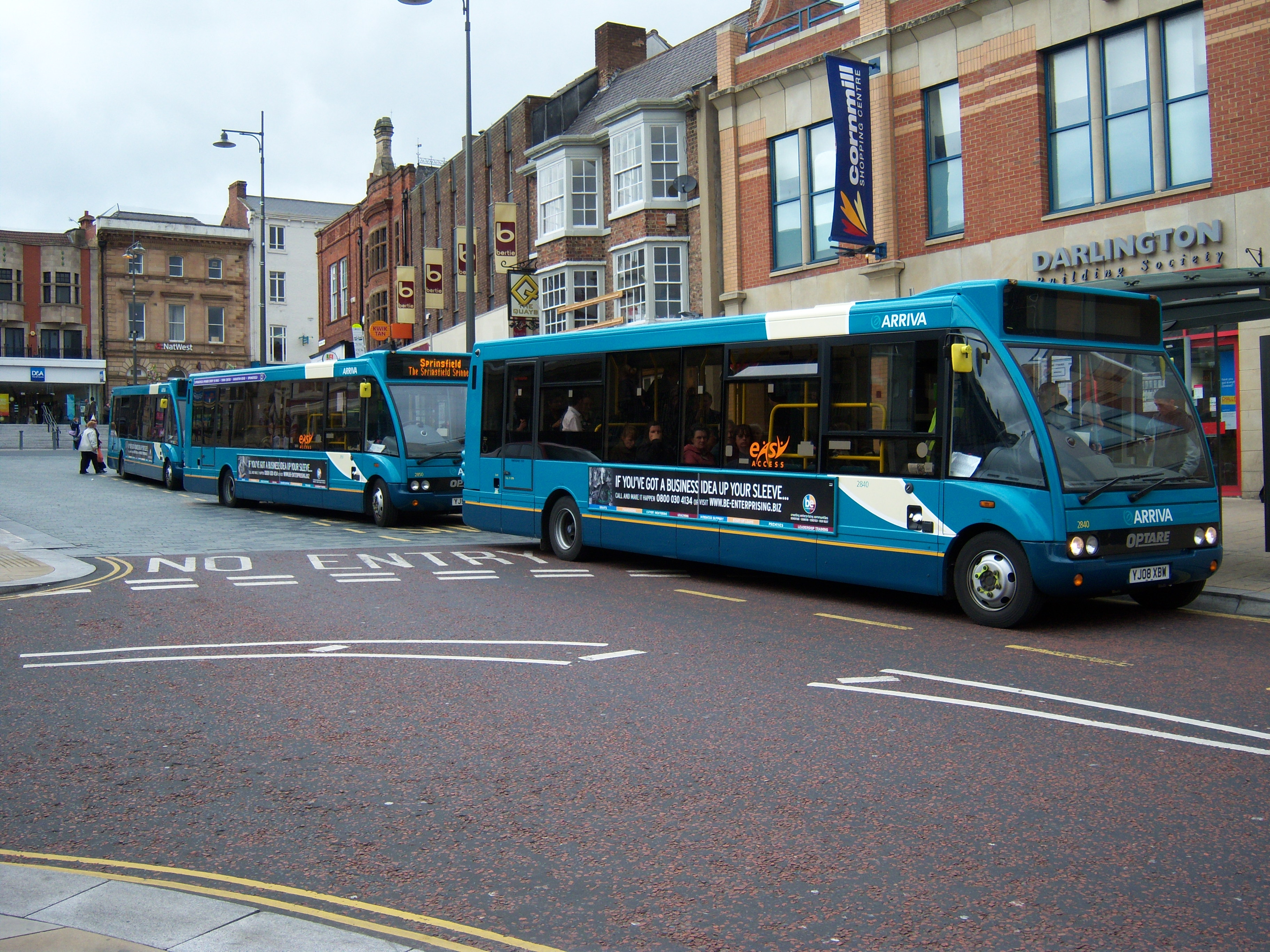
Arriva buses in Darlington

Bus routes in the town are provided mostly by Arriva North East; its services connect Darlington to neighbouring towns and cities such as Durham, Bishop Auckland, Richmond, Stockton and Middlesbrough. There are also two smaller independent operators running services: Dales & District and Hodgsons Buses.

Stagecoach North East operated originally in the town until 2007, when it sold its operations to Arriva. Stagecoach returned to Darlington in 2023, following the decision by Arriva to end its service 12 from Hurworth to Middleton St. George and Teesside Airport; it took over this service on 23 September 2023, renumbering it as route 6 (6A on Sundays) and extending it to Stockton, via Eaglescliffe, Yarm and Ingleby Barwick.

=== Cycling ===
Darlington was chosen by the Department for Transport as one of three national Sustainable Travel Demonstration Towns (together with Peterborough and Worcester) in 2004 and delivering a three-year research and marketing programme to promote sustainable travel choices under the brand name Local Motion. It was also chosen as one of six cycling demonstration towns in October 2005, receiving £3 million worth of funding from the government and local council money.

The 2007 Town Centre Pedestrian Heart Project, an investment of £10 million, saw some of Darlington's town centre modernised; there was an emphasis on vehicles becoming less common in the centre and some roads pedestrianised completely. Other improvements were to cycling facilities and routes, linking the town to the national cycle route network. Darlington is the only place to win both sustainable travel and cycling demonstration town status.

== Education ==
=== Museums and heritage ===
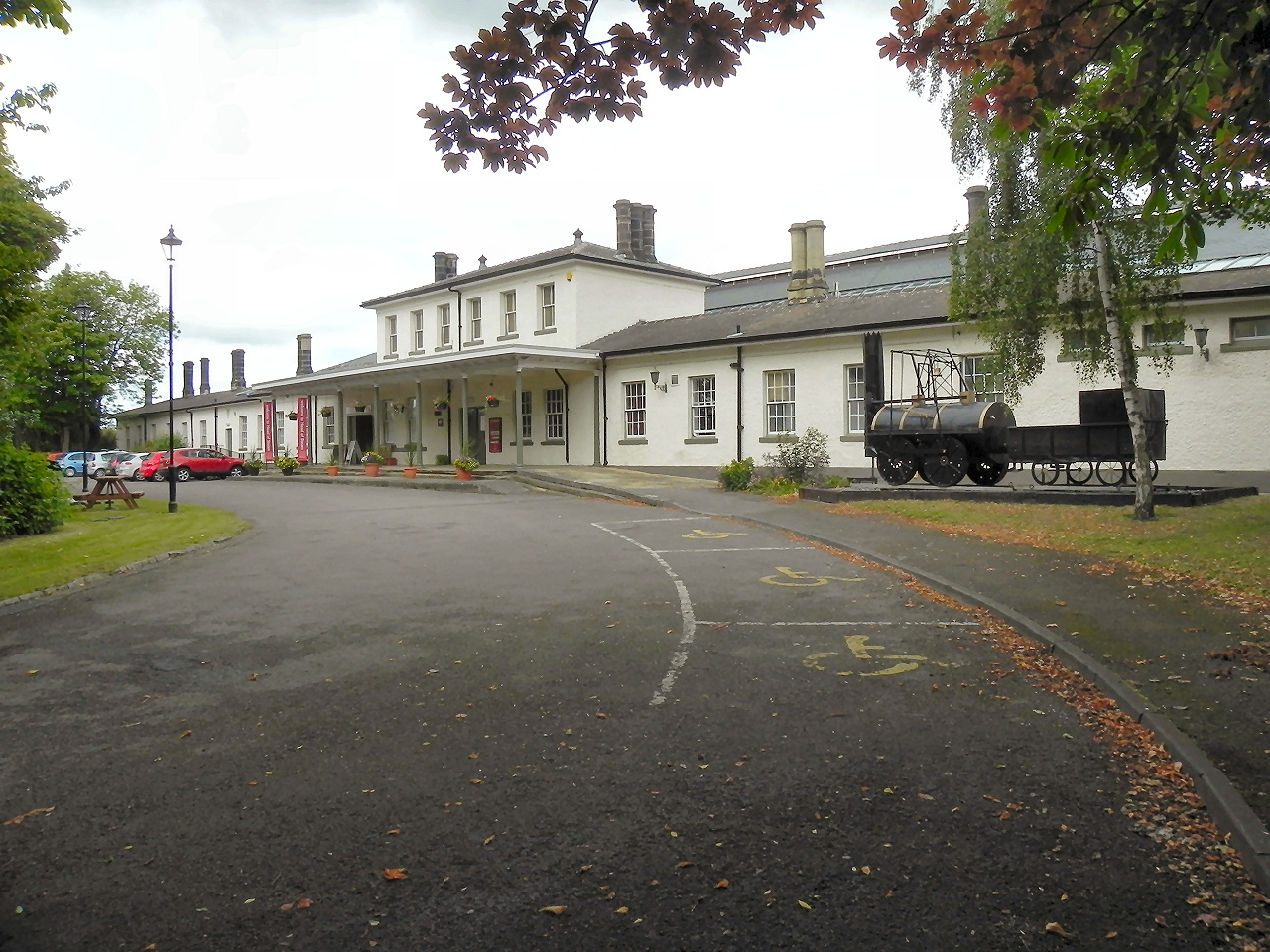
Hopetown Darlington railway museum

The town's main museum is Hopetown Darlington, sited near North Road railway station; it and Piercebridge Roman Fort near the town are run by the Darlington Museum Service.

=== Institutions ===
Teesside University opened a Darlington campus in 2011. It offers higher education in the town to students and businesses.

The town has one further education college, Darlington and two sixth form colleges: Queen Elizabeth and Carmel.

There are several secondary schools including: Wyvern, Haughton, Hummersknott, Hurworth School, Longfield and St Aidan's. Polam Hall is a former independent school and is now a free school.

There are also numerous primary schools, including: Federation of Abbey Schools, Mowden School, West Park School and Skerne Park.

== Media ==
Darlington is home to the regional daily newspaper The Northern Echo and its sister weekly newspaper Darlington & Stockton Times.

Local news and television programmes are provided by BBC North East and Cumbria and ITV Tyne Tees from the Bilsdale TV transmitter.

Local radio stations are BBC Radio Tees, Capital North East, Heart North East, Smooth North East, Greatest Hits Radio North East, Nation Radio North East, Hits Radio Teesside and Darlo Radio broadcasts from the town.

In November 2009, the town appointed an official Twitterer in residence, the first of its kind in the UK. Mike McTimoney (known on Twitter as TheDarloBard) is a local regular user who has been officially charged with tweeting for and about Darlington, and to help promote The Darlington Experiment 2.0, the town's social media campaign.

In August 2022, Darlington Borough Council confirmed that it would be placing a bid for Darlington to host the 2023 Eurovision Song Contest. However, the town was not part of the shortlist of potential host cities released on 12 August.

Several sketches from the BBC comedy programme The Fast Show were filmed in the town centre.

== Sport ==
=== Football ===
The town is home to Darlington Football Club which play at Blackwell Meadows and play in National League North. Darlington Railway Athletic F.C., plays in the Wearside League Division One and play at Brinkburn Road.

Darlington FC is known as The Quakers because of the contributions made to the town by men such as Edward and Joseph Pease, members of the Religious Society of Friends. Before the 2012 administration, played at the 25,000 capacity Darlington Arena (after 120 years at the Feethams ground) when it opened on Neasham Road in 2003. In the 2010–11 season Darlington won the FA Trophy however they were relegated from the Football League, into the then Football Conference. Administration caused Darlington to play home games at Heritage Park in Bishop Auckland and relegation by four divisions to Division One of the Northern Football League, of which the club was one of the founders of in 1889, for the 2012–13 season.

It moved back to Darlington from the 2016/17 season with a long term groundshare arrangement with Darlington RFC at Blackwell Meadows. Darlington's first home game at Blackwell Meadows (a 3–2 home win against FC Halifax Town) took place on 26 December 2016. In the subsequent season, the club was allowed to change back to its current name.

=== Rugby Union ===
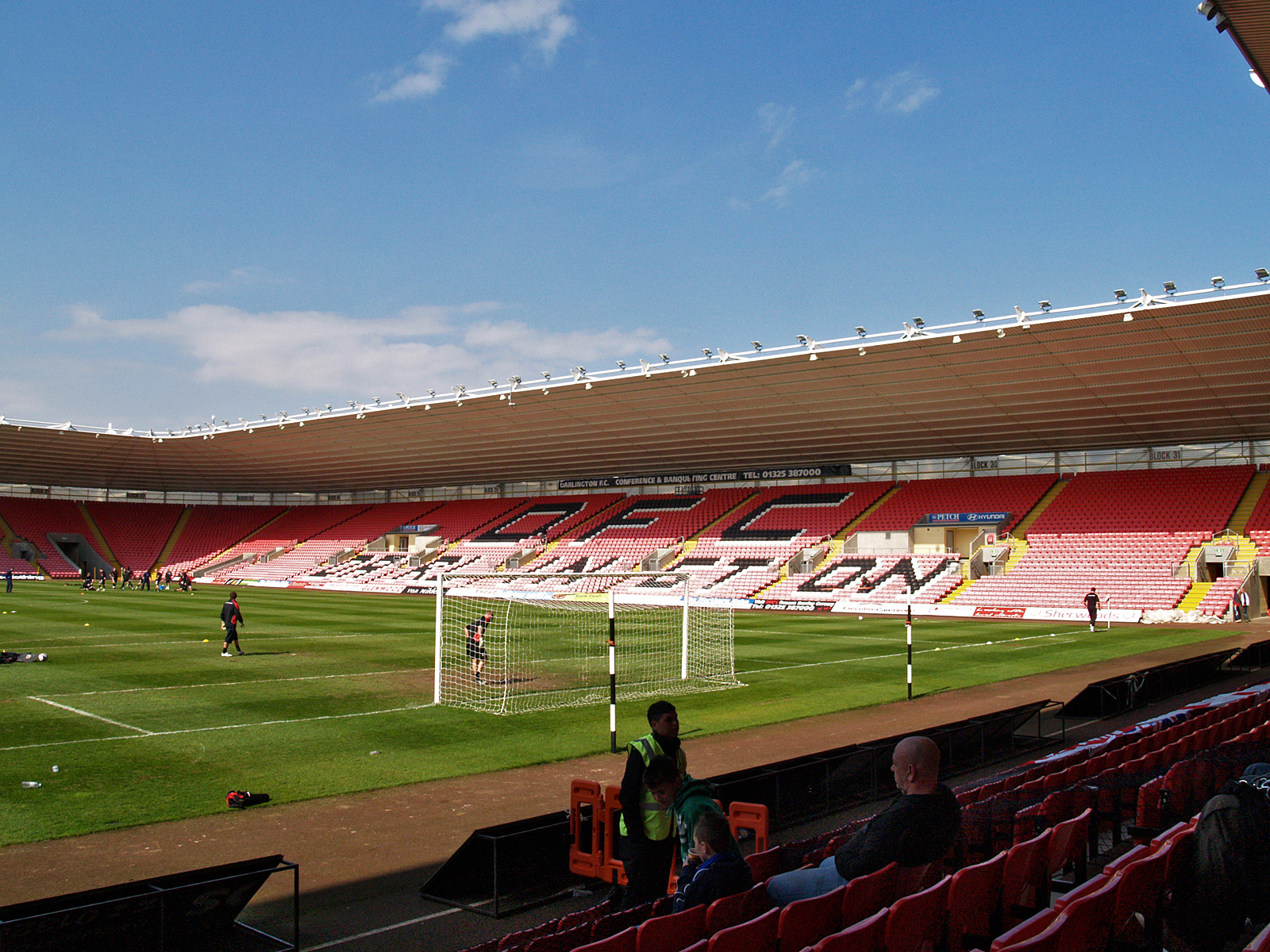
The Northern Echo Arena, home of Darlington Mowden

Darlington has two Rugby Union clubs Darlington Mowden RFC and Darlington RFC. Darlington Mowden Park play in National League 1, the third tier of English rugby union. The club own and play at the Darlington Arena, which played a role in the 2015 Rugby World Cup as hosts to the New Zealand national team. Darlington RFC play at Blackwell Meadows in Durham/Northumberland 2.

=== Athletics ===
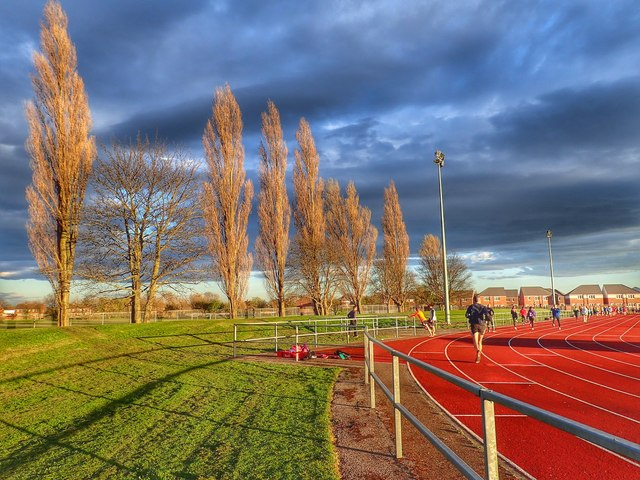
Eastbourne Leisure Centre's athletics track

Darlington's leading athletics club, Darlington Harriers AC, was formed in 1891 and has had a number of successful athletes wearing the club colours as well as competing internationally at Commonwealth, European and Olympic Games (London 1908, London 1948 and Tokyo 1964). The club stemmed from the Darlington Foot Harriers who travelled in packs hunting hares. Some of the key members, including Thomas and Charles Mountford, founded the club which went on to become one of the most notable clubs in the country.

The club celebrated its 125th year in 2016, with anniversary games held at Eastbourne Sports Complex and was also the first club in the UK to be granted a licence via England Athletics new systems whilst the country was coming out of the COVID19 pandemic.

In 2019, the club was awarded the Queen's Award for Voluntary Services (QAVS), which was created in 2002 to celebrate Queen Elizabeth II's Golden Jubilee. This was previously known as the Queen's Award for Voluntary Service (QAVS). Equivalent to an MBE, this award (changed to KAVS since King Charles III came to the throne) is the highest award given to local voluntary groups in the UK. The club was also winner of the 2021 and 2022 Regional England Athletics North East Volunteering Club of the Year awards.

In 2015, the club also moved away from the 'D' vest which had been introduced in the late 1970s, moving initially to Darlington Harriers before a new club logo was introduced in 2018. The new logo shape is the DL postcode area, includes the towns landmarks in Joseph Pease's statue, the town clock and the brick train which represents the town's history in the railway industry. The club has also introduced further events to its athletics calendar in recent years, adding to the existing 'Pitstop' 10km race which has been running since 2001. Multi-lap events held at South Park include South Park 10 (mile), South Park 20 were introduced in 2016 and The Marathon Paarlauf in 2022. The athletics track where the club are based at Eastbourne Complex received a make over in 2023 as part of a £1.6 million re-design of the complex with a new Blue 8 lane track to match the club colours.

The other athletics-based event is the Darlington 10km and 3km road run, which is held every August; it attracts around 2,000 competitors and is managed by the local council.

The Dolphin Centre, which provides a wide range of sporting facilities, was opened by Roger Bannister in 1982. It received a £5 million refurbishment in 2006 which was later officially opened by Redcar athlete Tanni Grey-Thompson.

=== Cricket ===
Cricket clubs in the town are Darlington Cricket Club and Darlington Railway Athletic Cricket Club. Both play in the North Yorkshire and South Durham Cricket League, Darlington CC won the league twenty times during the 20th century.

=== Field hockey ===
Darlington Hockey Club is a field hockey club that competes in the Yorkshire and North East Hockey League.

== Notable people ==
- George Allison – football manager in the 1930s
- James Atkinson (1780–1852) – surgeon, artist and Persian scholar
- Duncan Bannatyne – entrepreneur
- Garry Williamson Barnes - footballer
- Nick Bilton – columnist for The New York Times and bestselling author
- Julie Bindel – journalist, columnist, political activist, lesbian and gay rights campaigner, born in Darlington
- Zoe Birkett – singer, runner up on television show Pop Idol
- George Butterfield – Darlington Harrier's Former 100m record holder and Olympian
- Sandra Bowman – Olympic and Commonwealth Games swimmer in the 1980s
- Aidan Chambers – children's author
- Peter Chapman – convicted murderer, born in Darlington in 1977, brought up in nearby Stockton on Tees.
- Tom Craddock – footballer
- James Cudworth – locomotive superintendent for the South Eastern Railway (1845–76)
- Alex Cunningham – MP for Stockton North
- Giles Deacon – fashion designer
- J. M. Dent – publisher, produced Everyman's Library series
- Frederick Dickens – Charles Dickens' beloved scapegrace brother, buried in the West Cemetery
- Harry Dobinson – footballer
- Elizabeth Esteve-Coll (née Kingdon) – director of the Victoria and Albert Museum in London, the first woman to head a national arts institution
- John W. Ewbank – landscape and marine painter
- Simon Farnaby – actor, writer and comedian
- Don Featherstone – filmmaker
- Ruth Gemmell – actress
- Ian Hamilton – poet and editor
- Ann Heron – victim of notorious unsolved murder in the town in 1990
- Ralph Hodgson – poet
- George Gordon Hoskins – architect responsible for many of Darlington's Victorian buildings
- Joy Grieveson – European silver 400m medalist and Olympian
- Glenn Hugill – actor and television producer
- Richard Hurndall – actor
- Robert Anderson Jardine – vicar
- John Kenworthy – aeronautical engineer and aircraft designer in World War I
- Alan Kitching – typographic artist and teacher
- Philippa Langley – discovered the remains of Richard III in a car park in Leicester in 2012
- Mary Lawson (1910–1940) – stage and film actress of the 1920s and 1930s, born in Darlington, killed in air raid on Liverpool
- Michael Lee – hard rock drummer (Little Angels, The Cult, Page and Plant, Thin Lizzy)
- Florence Eva Simpson (Eva Lorence), (1865–1923), the popular composer and writer.
- Duncan Lorimer – astrophysicist
- Neil Maddison – footballer
- Jann Mardenborough – racing driver, Le Mans podium finisher
- James Morrison – footballer
- Mary Osborn (b. 1940) – cell biologist
- Al Pease – racing driver, only F1 driver disqualified for going too slow (1969 Canadian Grand Prix)
- Edward Pease (1767–1858) – Quaker industrialist and railway pioneer
- Joseph Pease (1799–1872) – Quaker industrialist and railway pioneer, first Quaker MP
- Julie Rayne – singer and actress
- Vic Reeves – comedian and author, grew up in Darlington from the age of 5
- Katherine Routledge (née Pease) – archaeologist and anthropologist, made first scientific survey of Easter Island
- Paul Smith – former radio executive and technology entrepreneur
- Willie Smith – twice winner of World Billiards Championship
- William Thomas Stead – campaigning journalist, editor of The Northern Echo, died in sinking of the RMS Titanic
- Sir John Summerson – architectural historian
- Paul Swift – professional stunt and precision driver
- Russ Swift – professional stunt and precision driver
- Callum Tarren - professional golfer (DP World Tour)
- Geoffrey Thwaites – GB International Swimmer, 200m Backstroke at the 1964 Olympics
- Cherry Valentine (1993–2022) – drag queen
- David Varey (born 1961) – cricketer
- Paul Walton – motoring journalist
- Issac Argie Ward - English Boxer
- Charlotte Whitehead (1843–1916) – pioneering Canadian woman physician, born in Darlington
- Giuseppe Wilson – footballer (Lazio and Italy)

== Twin towns ==
Darlington is twinned with:

- Mülheim an der Ruhr in Germany.
- Amiens in France.

== Gallery ==
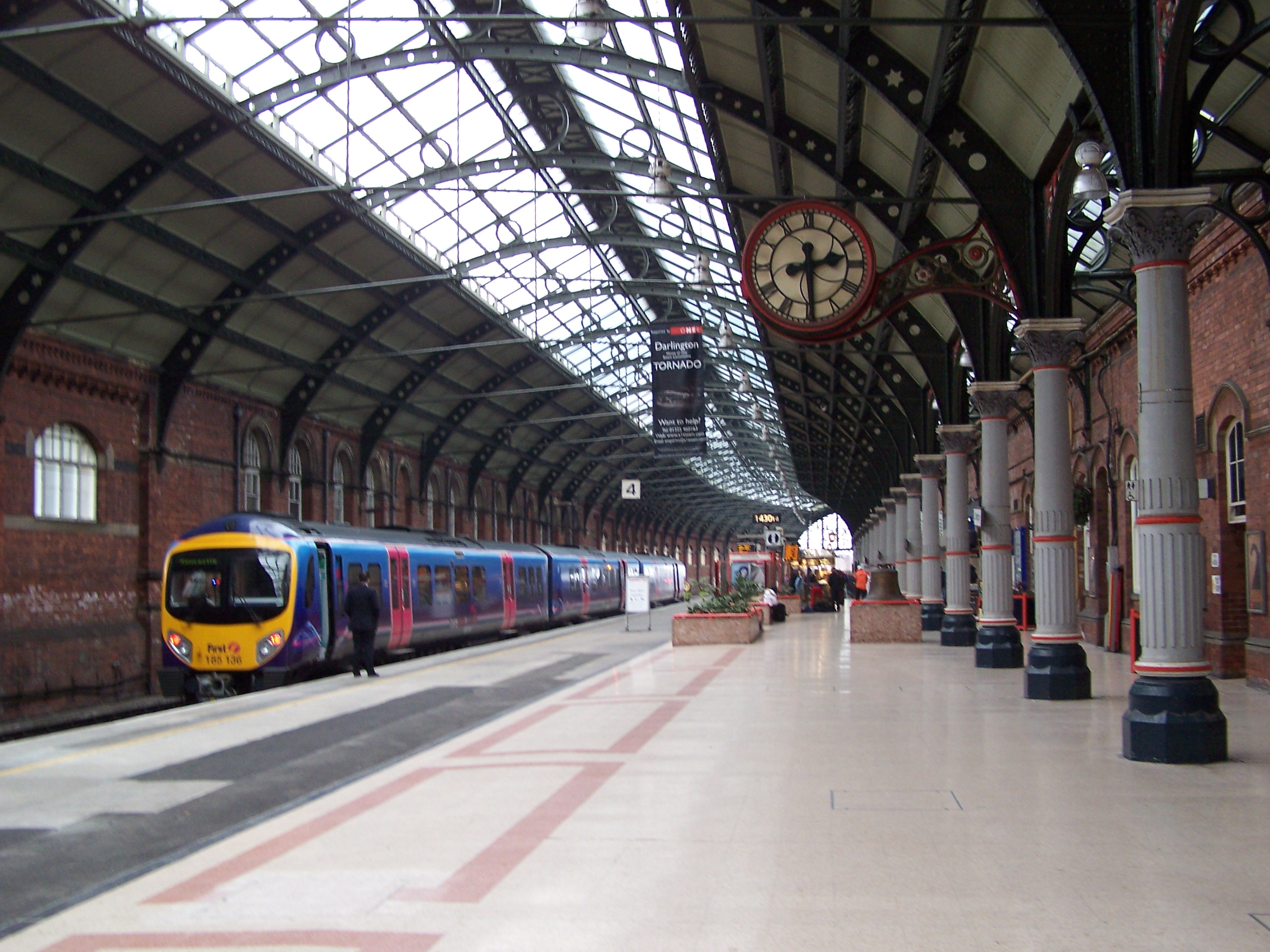
Darlington railway station

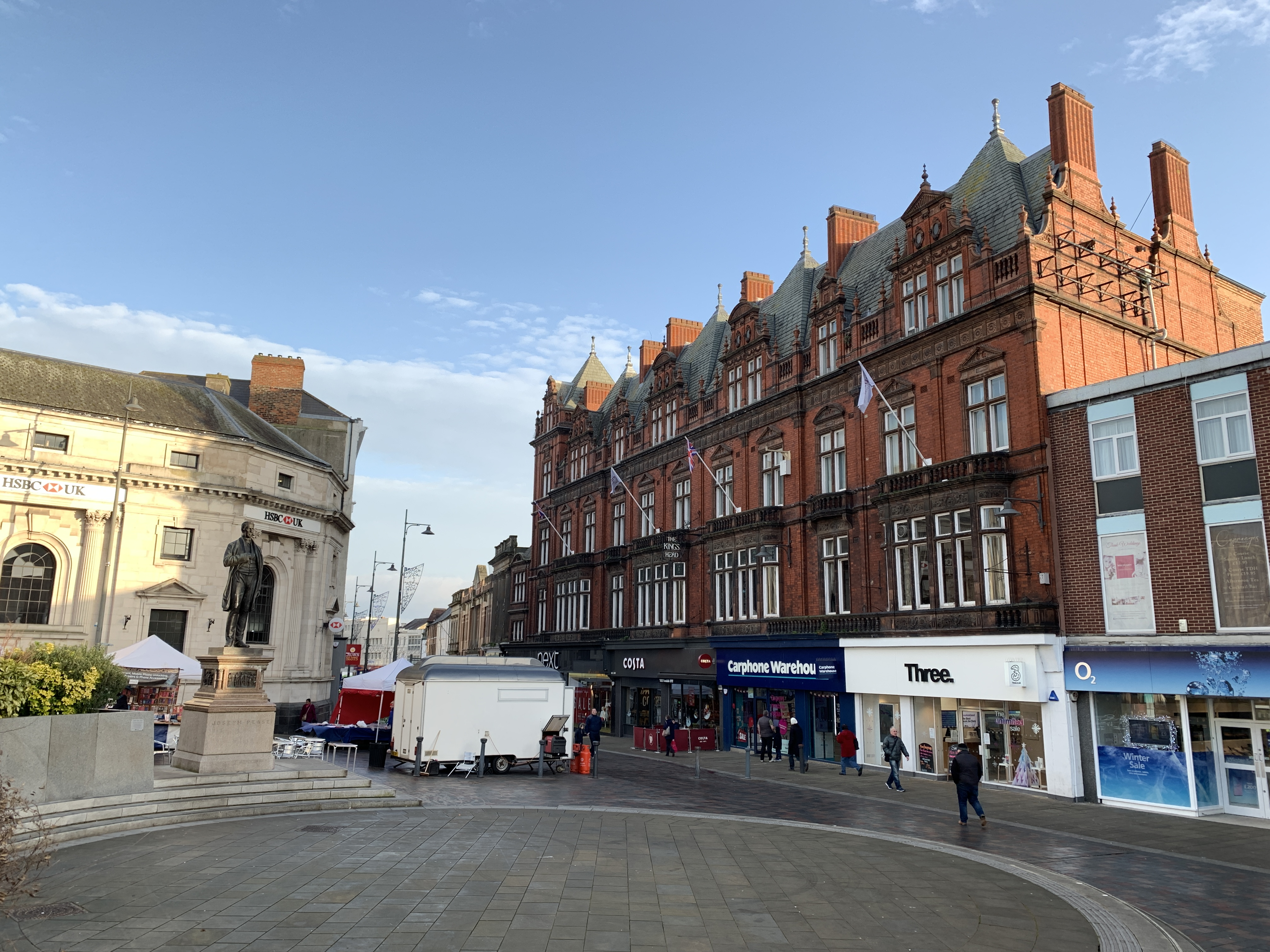
The north side of Darlington centre square

== See also ==
- Darlington Corporation Light Railways
- Trolleybuses in Darlington
- Murder of Ann Heron

== Sources ==
- Smailes, AE (1960). North England. Edinburgh: Thomas Nelson & Sons Ltd.
