= St Aidan's Church of England Academy =

Location
- Hundens Lane; Darlington, County Durham, DL1 1LL; England
- Coordinates: 54°31′33″N 1°31′57″W

Information
- Type: Academy
- Religious affiliation: Church of England
- Department for Education URN: 135314 Tables
- Ofsted: Reports
- Chair: Merion Baker
- Head Teacher: Nikki Gibb
- Gender: Coeducational
- Age: 11 to 16
- Enrolment: 550
- Website: www.staidansacademy.co.uk

Former school logo

St Aidan's Church of England Academy is a coeducational secondary school with academy status, in Darlington, County Durham, England. There are 550 pupils enrolled at the Academy for 2023.

== History ==
Originally Eastbourne Comprehensive School, the school converted to academy status and was renamed Eastbourne Church of England Academy. The school was later renamed St Aidan's Church of England Academy.

Eastbourne Comprehensive had itself been created from the merger of Eastbourne Secondary Modern Boys' School and Eastbourne Secondary Modern Girls' School in 1968. These schools had been in existence since 1936. The boys' school was visited by Prince Philip.

The new academy building was built on Hundens Park, to the north of the original school site.

== Ofsted ==
In January 2020 the school was judged Good in all areas by Ofsted. "This is a school of great warmth. It feels almost possible to reach out and touch the school’s caring ethos. The pupils are proud of the school."

There was an inspection in 2025 and Ofsted stated in all categories that the school was good.

== Notable former pupils ==
=== Eastbourne Comprehensive School ===
- Tom Sawyer, Baron Sawyer, trade unionist and Labour Party politician
- Vic Reeves, comedian
- Andrew Fothergill, cricketer

=== St Aidan's Church of England Academy ===
- Alex Pattison, footballer
