= Beaumont Hill =

Village in County Durham, England

Coordinates: 54°33′32″N 1°32′55″W

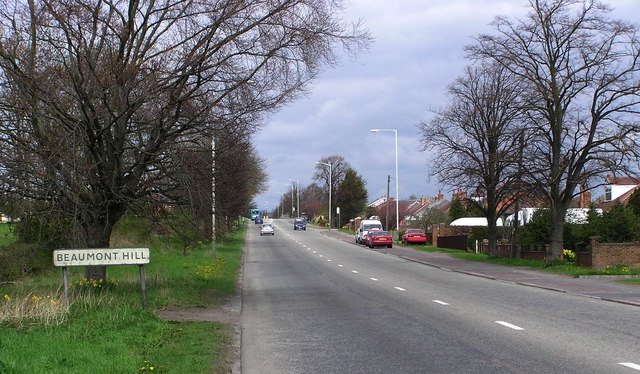
The A167 road through Beaumont Hill

Beaumont Hill is a village in the borough of Darlington and the traditional and ceremonial counties of Durham in England, situated directly to the north of Darlington on the A167 road.
