= Harrowgate, County Durham =

Area of Darlington, England

Coordinates: 54.555°N 1.553°W

Harrowgate Hill
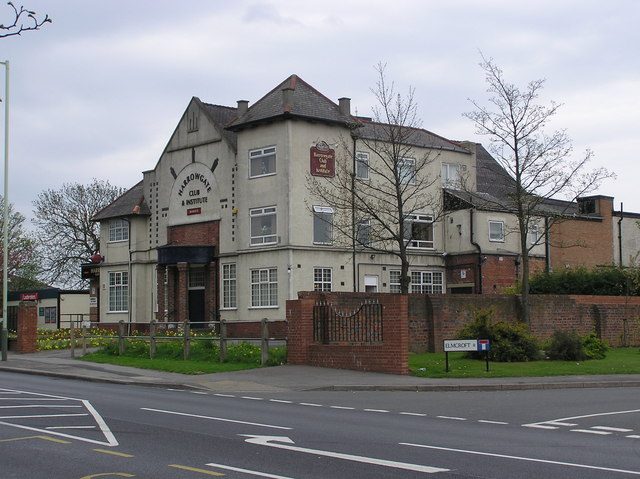
- Harrowgate Hill Club and Institute

- Location within County Durham
- Population: 5,997 (2011 census)
- OS grid reference: NZ290178
- Unitary authority: Darlington
- Ceremonial county: Durham
- Region: North East
- Country: England
- Sovereign state: United Kingdom
- Post town: DARLINGTON
- Postcode district: DL3
- Police: Durham
- Fire: County Durham and Darlington
- Ambulance: North East
- Website: www.whessoeparishcouncil.org.uk

Harrowgate Hill is a suburb of Darlington, in the Borough of Darlington, County Durham, England. The area includes the villages of Beaumont Hill, the Harrowgate Village as well as Ashbrook and Harrowgate Hill with the latter the largest part of the area.

== Description ==
The area is covered by the Harrowgate Hill Ward, the villages are in the Whessoe civil parish (the name is notable for its use as a name for the Whessoe company) and the rest is unparished. Before the ward boundary changes in 2015 was enclosed on two sides by railways — the East Coast Main Line to the east, and the Tees Valley Line to the west. The Ashbrook area, which lies to the east of the main line now also forms part of the ward. The ward extends as far south as Thompson Street and as far north as Beaumont Hill. The old ward population was 5,997 at the 2011 census and needed expanding to meet around 7,000.

In 1894 Harrowgate Hill became a separate civil parish, being formed from the parts of Cockerton and Haughton-le-Skerne in Darlington Municipal Borough, on 1 October 1907 the parish was abolished and merged with Darlington. In 1901 the parish had a population of 2316.
