= Haughton Academy =

Coordinates: 54.5410°N 1.5287°W

Location
- Salters Lane South; Haughton-le-Skerne; Darlington; Darlington, Durham, DL1 2AN; England

Information
- Type: Academy
- Motto: Where learning has no limits
- Established: 1958
- Closed: Haughton Community School: 2006
- School district: County Durham
- Local authority: Darlington Borough Council
- Trust: Education Village Academy Trust
- Department for Education URN: 138089 Tables
- Ofsted: Reports
- President: Mike Butler
- Principal: Jane Darbyshire
- Staff: 85
- Gender: Coeducational
- Age: 11 to 16
- Capacity: 900
- Language: English
- Colours: (2006-2023) (2023-present)
- Website: https://www.haughtonacademy.org.uk/

Haughton Academy (formerly Haughton Community School) is a coeducational secondary school with academy status located in Darlington, County Durham, England. The school educates pupils aged 11 to 16 and is part of the Education Village Academy Trust.

Previously a community school administered by Darlington Borough Council, the school converted to academy status in April 2012 and was subsequently renamed Haughton Academy.

== History ==
=== Education Village development ===
In 2006, Haughton Community School relocated to a newly constructed £27 million multi-school campus known as The Education Village. The development brought together Haughton Community School, Springfield Primary School and Beaumont Hill Special School on a single site, forming one of the first federated learning campuses of its kind in England. The complex was officially opened in July 2006 by Prime Minister Tony Blair.

The Education Village was designed to promote collaboration between mainstream and special education provision through shared facilities, joint staffing initiatives and integrated pupil support services. Following the conversion of Haughton Community School to academy status in 2012, the federation developed into The Education Village Academy Trust, which subsequently expanded beyond the original campus. Additional schools joining the trust include Gurney Pease Academy, Marchbank Free School, Whinfield Primary School and Reid Street Primary School, all located across Darlington.

=== Conversion to academy status ===
On 1 April 2012, Haughton Community School converted to academy status and was renamed Haughton Academy. The school became part of The Education Village Academy Trust, established to oversee schools within the federation.

=== Facilities development ===
In July 2019, Lord Agnew, Parliamentary Under-Secretary of State for the School System, visited the Education Village after Haughton Academy was selected to participate in the programme. During the visit, school leaders presented development plans for the new outdoor sports facilities and highlighted wider ambitions to improve pupil wellbeing, participation in physical activity and community engagement across the shared campus.

== Governance ==
As of 2026, membership of the Education Standards Committee includes:

- Jane Darbyshire – Principal (ex-officio)
- Karen Oakes – Board-appointed governor
- Rachel Coning – Board-appointed governor
- Sarah Ramsden – Board-appointed governor
- Glenn Soane – Board-appointed governor
- Carmen Miclea – Parent governor
- Angela Coulson – Staff governor
- Chris Ashford – Trustee oversight representative

== Admissions ==
Haughton Academy is a non-selective secondary school admitting pupils aged 11 to 16. Admissions are administered by The Education Village Academy Trust, which acts as the admissions authority, and operates in coordination with Darlington Borough Council through the local authority’s coordinated secondary school admissions scheme. The academy has a published admission number of 180 pupils for entry into Year 7 each September. Where applications exceed available places, priority is given in accordance with the academy’s oversubscription criteria, including looked-after children, siblings of current pupils, proximity to the school and exceptional medical or social need.

== Awards and recognition ==
In 2022, Haughton Academy was awarded an overall rating of Good by Ofsted for the first time in its history. Inspectors rated the academy as good in the areas of quality of education, behaviour and attitudes, personal development, and leadership and management, marking a significant improvement from previous inspection outcomes which had judged the school as requiring improvement.

The academy has also been recognised regionally through its participation in the Education Village Academy Trust and wider Darlington 11–19 education partnership, including acknowledgement for pupil involvement in active citizenship initiatives supporting community engagement and social responsibility.

== Previous headteachers ==
Name	Tenure start	Tenure end	Length of tenure	Ref
Rachel Ireland	January 1, 2011	August 31, 2015	4 years, 243 days	
Jonathan Lumb	September 1, 2015	March 31, 2022	6 years, 212 days	
Su Gill	April 1, 2022	August 31, 2025	3 years, 153 days	
Jane Darbyshire	September 1, 2025	present	1 year, 17 days	

== Academic performance ==
=== Ofsted reports ===
==== Haughton Community School ====
- 2008: Satisfactory
- 2011: Satisfactory

==== Haughton Academy ====
- 2014: Requires Improvement
- 2018: Requires Improvement
- 2022: Good
- 2026: TBD

== Notable visitors ==
On Friday 21 July 2006, Tony Blair opened the brand new building of Haughton Academy after Haughton community school.

On 29 January 2024, Rishi Sunak, who was the British Prime Minister, visited the school to discuss disposable vapes. At Haughton Academy, he announced via a speech in the schools LRC and also went into a personal development lesson to discuss with Year 9 pupils and their teacher, Amie Bell about the hazards of vaping. Sunak and Peter Gibson also discussed the hazards of vaping with a selection of pupils from the school. Sunak's visit was only brief. This is the second time a British Prime Minister has visited Haughton Academy.
