= List of settlements on the River Tees =

This is a list of settlements on the River Tees in County Durham and North Yorkshire, England.

from source

- Forest-in-Teesdale
- Bowlees
- Newbiggin, Teesdale
- Middleton-in-Teesdale
- Eggleston
- Cotherstone
- Barnard Castle
- Startforth
- Whorlton, County Durham
- Wycliffe, County Durham
- Ovington, County Durham
- Winston, County Durham
- Piercebridge
- High Coniscliffe
- Cleasby
- Stapleton-on-Tees
- Croft-on-Tees
- Dalton-on-Tees
- Hurworth Place
- Hurworth-on-Tees
- Neasham
- Eryholme
- Sockburn
- Girsby
- Low Dinsdale
- Low Worsall
- Aislaby, County Durham
- Yarm
- Eaglescliffe
- Preston-on-Tees
- Thornaby-on-Tees
- Stockton-on-Tees
- Middlesbrough
