= John Wallis (antiquary) =

John Wallis (1714 – 19 July 1793) was an English cleric, antiquarian, naturalist and county historian.

== Life ==
The son of John Wallace or Wallis of Croglin, Cumberland, he was born at Castlenook, a farmhouse inside the ramparts of the Roman fort of Whitley Castle, South Tindale, in the parish of Kirkhaugh, Northumberland, in 1714. He matriculated at The Queen's College, Oxford, on 3 February 1733, graduated B.A. in 1737, and proceeded M.A.

Having taken holy orders, Wallis held a curacy for a few years in the Portsmouth area. He then became curate of Simonburn, Northumberland. On the death of its rector in 1771, the living was given to the overbearing James Scott who, it was said "had more regard for his spaniels than his curate". Wallis, had to leave, and was taken into the family of his college friend Edward Wilson, vicar of Haltwhistle.

In 1775 Wallis acted as temporary curate at St Andrew's Church, Haughton-le-Skerne, and in the same year was appointed to Billingham, near Stockton-on-Tees, where he remained till midsummer 1792, when illness obliged him to resign. In 1779 Thomas Pennant tried without success to secure him some preferment, from the Bishop of Durham. About two years before his death a small estate fell to him by the death of a brother, and Bishop Shute Barrington allowed him an annual pension from the time of his resigning the curacy of Billingham. Wallis then removed to the neighbouring village of Norton, where he died on 19 July 1793. He left a collection of books, mainly on natural history.

== Works ==
Wallis had a taste for botany, and spent two decades researching a county history of Northumberland. The Natural History and Antiquities of Northumberland, and so much of the County of Durham as lies between the Rivers Tyne and Tweed, commonly called North Bishoprick (London, 1769, 2 vols.) was Wallis's major work. The first volume, which is the more complete, deals with minerals, fossils, plants, and animals of the county, the plants being named according to John Ray, and including cryptogams; the botanist Nathaniel John Winch considered he had misidentified a few plants. The second volume covered antiquities, arranged in three tours through the county.

Some of Wallis's letters to the antiquary George Allan were printed in John Nichols's Literary Anecdotes (viii. 759–60). In 1748 he published, by subscription, The Occasional Miscellany, in Prose and Verse (Newcastle upon Tyne, 1748, 2 vols.). It contained sermons and two poems, The Royal Penitent: or Human Frailty delineated in the Person of David, in about four hundred rhyming couplets, and The Exhortation of the Royal Penitent, a paraphrase of Psalm 107.

== Family ==
Wallis's wife of 56 years, Elizabeth, survived until 1801; the match was considered very happy.

== Notes ==
Attribution

This article incorporates text from a publication now in the public domain: Lee, Sidney, ed. (1899). "Wallis, John (1714-1793)". Dictionary of National Biography. Vol. 59. London: Smith, Elder & Co.
