= Polam Hall School =

Location
- Grange Road; Darlington, County Durham, DL1 5PA; England
- Coordinates: 54.5190°N 1.5599°W

Information
- Type: Free school; former Boarding school
- Motto: Concordia crescimus ("Grow in harmony")
- Established: 1848; 178 years ago
- Founder: Jane Procter
- Local authority: Darlington
- Department for Education URN: 142174 Tables
- Ofsted: Reports
- Chair of Governors: Sally Pelham
- Principal: Kate Reid
- Gender: Mixed
- Enrolment: 300+
- Houses: Swale, Kent, Skerne and Tees
- Website: Polam Hall School

Polam Hall School is a mixed all-through school located in Darlington, County Durham, England. Polam Hall was founded as a Quaker "boarding school" for girls. It is now mixed-gender and inter-denominational but still retains its Quaker traditions and ethos.

== History of the house ==
In 1642 the Turner family sold two pieces of land totalling about five acres to John Theobalds, who combined them into an estate with a field he owned called Polam and gave it the name Polam Hill (although it was also known as Glasensikes). The Warwicke family acquired this estate and sold it on to a local surgeon, Robert Hylton. A lawyer, Lawrence Brockett, bought and conveyed it to the Wensley family in 1728. James Allan, esq, bought it from them in 1754. It passed from him to the Lambton family and then to Harrington Lee, a Darlington merchant, who built a house, Polam Hall, in 1794 and lived there with his family for 27 years. Upon his death in 1824 the family sold the Polam Hill estate on which the hall stood.

In 1825, Jonathan Backhouse, a financial backer of the railways, bought Polam Hall and was responsible for renovations including the landscaping of the grounds; it was not until 1828 that his wife Hannah (née Chapman Gurney) and family moved in. As members of the Darlington Society of Friends (Quakers) and ministers they undertook missionary work resulting in them having to travel extensively around England and America. As cousins of Edward Pease, Joseph John Gurney and Elizabeth Fry, they were able to work with each other to improve their world. In the 1841 census, the family are listed as living in 'Polam Hall', but it is understood that both Jonathan, who died in 1842, and Hannah, who died in 1850, continued to refer to their home as 'Polam Hill'.

== The school history ==
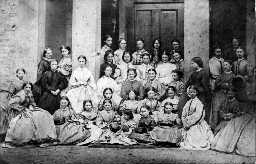
1864 staff and pupils at Polam Hall School

'Polam Hall' was sold to William and Robert Thompson, who leased it to the Procter sisters for use as a Quaker ladies’ finishing school. Jane Proctor had founded her first school in Selby which had lasted for twenty years. She founded "Selby School" in 1848 as a boarding school for girls at Number 11 Townhouse, in Houndgate helped by her sisters Elizabeth and Barbara. Their school moved to Polam Hall after six years with Jane Procter as the head.

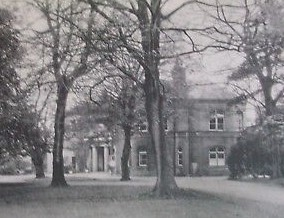
Polam Hall (from the Drive) in 1910

Polam Hall's owners (the Thompsons) went into liquidation in 1878, and one of their largest creditors, Quaker M.P. Arthur Pease, became Polam's new owner.

In 2004, boys were introduced to the school for the first time when the sixth form became coeducational. Previously, some boys from the nearby boys' independent school Hurworth House School would take certain subjects there. A separate boys' senior section was later set up for boys aged 11–16. After the closure of its sister school Hurworth House.

In October 2013, the school announced intentions to convert from a private to a free school in 2015..."Independent Education without Fees". In June 2014, the school was awarded free school status by the Department of Education, and became a free (or public) school in September 2015. In 2017 it joined the Woodard Academies Trust. Polam Hall is funded by the state, but, according to its website, "retains an independent-school ethos".

== Boarding and sixth form no more ==
Boarding was available to pupils aged 8 and above. They were looked after by a team of resident house staff. The school announced in 2019 that it would cease taking boarders in 2019 because the numbers involved made it noncommercial. The school's sixth form had already proved to be too small.

== Polam Old Scholars ==
The Polam Hall Old Scholars Association (PHOSA) has existed since 1894 and is a registered charity (No. 1058652), old scholars receive an annual newsletter and have the opportunity to attend the PHOSA AGM every June.

Notable Old Scholars include:

- Ruth Gemmell – actor, theatre director and playwright
- Ann Jellicoe – actor, theatre director and playwright
- Maria Jane Taylor (née Dyer) – 19th-century Protestant Christian missionary in China
