= Hurworth-on-Tees =

Village in County Durham, England

Coordinates: 54.48699°N 1.52852°W

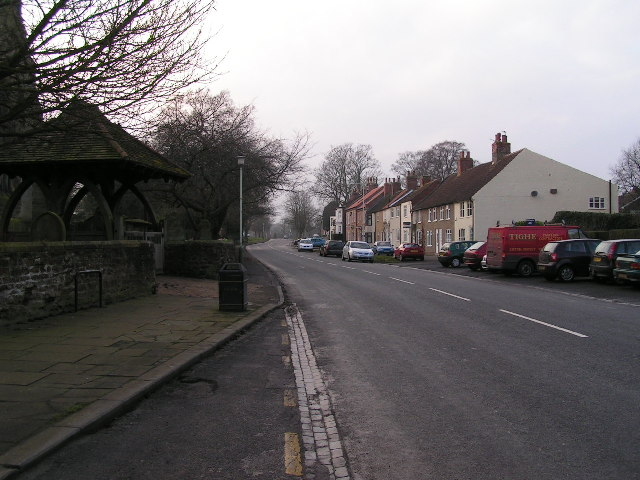
- Hurworth-on-Tees

- Location within County Durham
- Population: 3,264 (2011)
- OS grid reference: NZ314098
- Civil parish: Hurworth
- Unitary authority: Darlington
- Ceremonial county: County Durham
- Region: North East
- Country: England
- Sovereign state: United Kingdom
- Post town: Darlington
- Postcode district: DL2
- Police: Durham
- Fire: County Durham and Darlington
- Ambulance: North East
- UK Parliament: Stockton West

Hurworth-on-Tees is a village in the borough of Darlington, within the ceremonial county of County Durham, England. It is situated in the civil parish of Hurworth. The village lies to the south of Darlington on the River Tees, close to its meeting point with the River Skerne, and immediately adjoins the village of Hurworth Place, which forms part of the same civil parish.

== History ==
There has been a settlement at Hurworth since at least as far back as the 12th century. The estate that Hurworth was part of has changed hands many times over the centuries.

In 1665, the Great Plague almost wiped out the village population of 750 leaving only around 75 survivors. The plague struck many other nearby villages including Birkby and South Cowton. Three dips in the village green mark the site where as many as 1,500 people were buried in massive lime pits. According to old records, bodies from other nearby villages were ferried across the River Tees for burial in Hurworth.

Perhaps the most famous person to have lived in Hurworth was William Emerson, an eminent mathematician born in Hurworth in 1701. He was educated at Newcastle upon Tyne and York and then devoted himself to mathematics. He died at Hurworth in 1782 and has a monument in the church of All Saints.

== Amenities ==
The church of All Saints is situated in the middle of the village. There may have been a church on the site as early as the 12th century. The church was extensively rebuilt in the 1830s and again in 1871.

There was a school at Hurworth before 1770, when it was refounded. Currently the village has two schools. Hurworth Primary School caters for around 250 children aged 4–11. The secondary school is called Hurworth School; it caters for around 650 students aged 11–16. There was also a small independent school, Hurworth House School, which closed in the summer of 2010.

The Hurworth Grange Community Centre is based in a manor house built in 1875 by the Backhouse family. Facilities include the large hall, meeting rooms, lounge bar, sports hall, football pitch, children's play area, 14 acres (57,000 m^{2}) of grounds and a concrete skateboard ramp. Hurworth Grange was once visited by Rudyard Kipling; it is claimed that 'The Roman Centurion's Song' is based on a sarcophagus he saw there. The village has a number of other amenities including an Italian restaurant, village shop, pubs (The Bay Horse and the Emerson Arms), a garage, community karate club (Kyosho Karate) and a residential home.

== Transport ==
The A167 road crosses the River Tees via Croft Bridge on its way towards Darlington, passing through Hurworth Place. The bridge was built on the site of an older one in 1673. The bridge has been closed to traffic many times in recent decades because of flooding of the Tees due to heavy rainfall in Teesdale. The fourth of the seven arches on the bridge marks the boundary between North Yorkshire and County Durham.

The Stockton and Darlington Railway Company opened a branch line in 1829 which ran from Darlington and terminated within Hurworth parish, close to Croft Bridge. The settlement that grew up around it became known as Hurworth Place, described in 1834 as a hamlet in the township of Hurworth, growing rapidly under the influence of the railhead and coal depot. In 1841, the Great North of England Railway opened the main line between Darlington and York, passing through Hurworth parish; the previous branch line and terminus remained as goods facilities. A passenger station was built on the new line in Hurworth Place, although it was named Croft Station and later renamed Croft Spa Station after the village of Croft-on-Tees which faces Hurworth Place on the opposite bank of the Tees. The branch line and goods yard, by then known as Croft Depot, closed in 1964, and Croft Spa station closed in 1969, but the line remains, forming part of the East Coast Main Line between Darlington and Northallerton.

When travelling on the East Coast Main Line it is possible to see Rockliffe Park training ground, which lies to the east of the village. It is the training ground for Middlesbrough FC.

== Notable people ==
- William Emerson
- Eve Robson

== See also ==
- List of settlements on the River Tees
- List of places in County Durham
- Old Hall, Hurworth-on-Tees
