= Hurworth Place =

Village in County Durham, England

Coordinates: 54.483°N 1.549°W

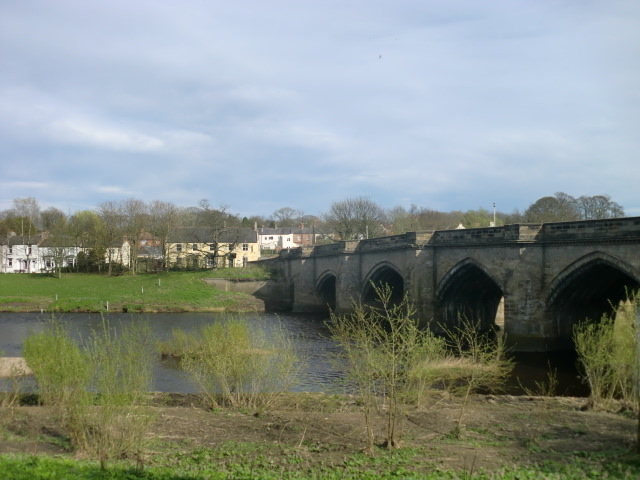
- Hurworth Place and Croft Bridge, from the opposite bank of the River Tees

- Location within County Durham
- OS grid reference: NZ2931809833
- Civil parish: Hurworth
- Unitary authority: Darlington
- Ceremonial county: County Durham
- Region: North East
- Country: England
- Sovereign state: United Kingdom
- Police: Durham
- Fire: County Durham and Darlington
- Ambulance: North East
- UK Parliament: Sedgefield

Hurworth Place is a village in County Durham, in England. It lies south of Darlington on the northern bank of the River Tees, opposite the village of Croft-on-Tees in North Yorkshire to which it is linked by Croft Bridge, a Grade I listed structure dating from the 14th century, which marks the county boundary. It is part of the civil parish of Hurworth.

== Transport ==
The Great North Road mail coach route, later the A1 road, originally passed through the village, crossing the Tees via Croft Bridge. It was later rerouted, and the road is now designated the A167. The Teesdale Way footpath runs through the village, as does the East Coast Main Line, although there is no longer a railway station.

== Amenities ==
The village has a newsagent, a doctor's surgery, a garage, a pharmacy, and a hair salon. There is a working men's club, and one pub called the Comet, named after a shorthorn bull. There is also a Christadelphian hall. Rockliffe Hall hotel and spa and the surrounding parkland are owned by Middlesbrough Football Club, and the club's training and sports facilities form part of the complex. The 18-hole Rockliffe championship golf course is one of the longest in Europe. The adjoining village of Hurworth-on-Tees contains further shops, a primary and secondary school, the parish church and a Methodist church, a garden centre, a fish and chip shop and a community centre.

== History ==
Despite being in a different county, the settlement around the Durham end of Croft bridge has sometimes been identified as part of Croft village, rather than with Hurworth-on-Tees immediately to the east. In 1834 Hurworth Place was described as a hamlet in the township of Hurworth, growing rapidly under the influence of the railhead and coal depot; however, in 1901, Charles G. Harper referred to Croft as "straggling on both the Yorkshire and Durham banks of the Tees". As late as 1960, a long-time Croft resident referred to "the part of Croft which is called Hurworth Place". The village began to develop around the time the railway arrived in 1829, and in addition to a coal depot and goods yard, the low ground near the river housed at various times a tar works and two brick and tile works.

== Railway ==
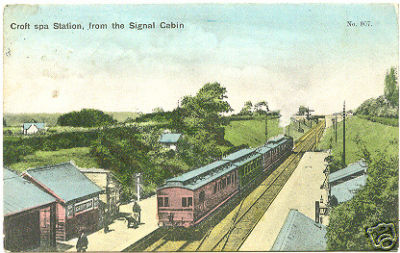
Croft Spa railway station in Hurworth Place, 1908

In 1829 the Croft branch line was built by the Stockton and Darlington Railway Company from Darlington to Croft terminus on the north bank of the Tees in Hurworth Place. Coal was brought by rail from Darlington to the terminus for road transport to destinations in South Durham and North Yorkshire. Lead from the Swaledale lead mines was also brought to Croft terminus for onward rail transport. Passenger services ran at times on the line, but it was largely a goods route. Workers' houses were built around the terminus.

On 4 January 1841 the main line between Darlington and York opened, incorporating some of the original Darlington-Croft branch line, which had been bought by the main line's developers, the Great North of England Railway. Through Hurworth Place the new line ran, and still runs, a short distance east of the original line, which remained as a branch line to serve the Croft goods yard. In March 1841 a new Croft Station opened on the main line; this was renamed Croft Spa Station in 1896 acknowledging its role in bringing visitors to the popular and established spa over the bridge at Croft-on-Tees. The goods yard, now known as Croft Depot, remained in use until 1964, when it was demolished, the branch line taken up and the site redeveloped for residential use. Croft Spa station closed to passengers in 1969 and the platforms and station buildings were demolished.
