= List of tributaries of the River Tees =

This is a list of tributaries of the River Tees from its source at Teeshead to its mouth at Middlesbrough.

== Teeshead Source to Cow Green Reservoir ==
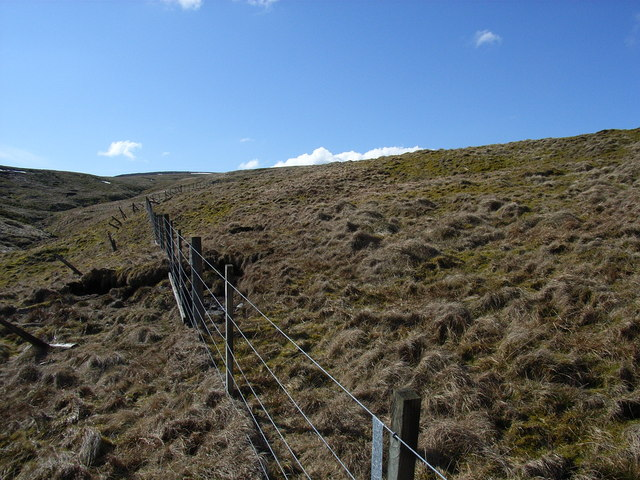
Tees Head, just below the source of the river.

- Slate Sike
- Swath Beck
- Crooked Beck
- Rake Sike
- Fallcrag Sike
- Trout Beck
- Tynegreen Sike
- Great Dodgen Pot Sike
- Crook Burn
- Smithy Sike
- Little Dodgen Pot Sike
- Green Hurth Sike
- Force Burn

== Cow Green Reservoir ==
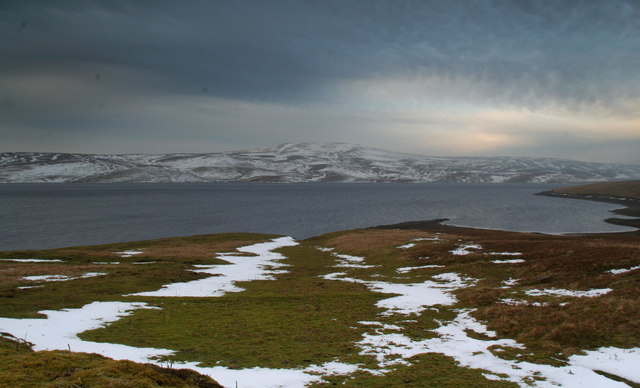
Cow Green Reservoir

The following waterways empty into the reservoir.

- Borderonmere Sike
- Dubby Sike
- Dubbysike East Grain
- Near Hole Sike
- Weelhead Sike
- Cowgreen Sike
- Stapestone Sike
- Red Sike
- Whitespot Sike
- Deadcrook Sike
- Cockle Sike
- Rowantree Sike
- Mattergill Sike

== Cow Green Reservoir to Middleton-in-Teesdale ==
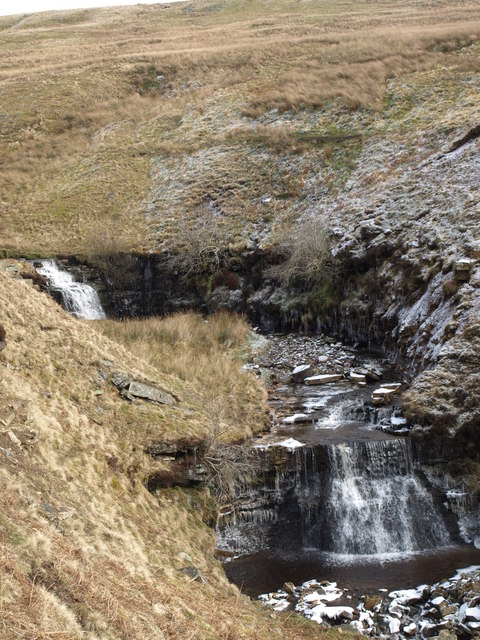
Hudeshope Beck Waterfalls

- Maize Beck
- Tinkler's Sike
- Birkdale Hush
- Merrygill Beck
- Crookus Gill
- Black Sike
- Fox Earth's Gill
- Fold Sike
- Holmwath Sike
- Wildscar Sike
- South Loom Sike
- Harwood Beck
- Little Sike
- Dufton Sike
- Fell Dike Sike
- Skyer Beck
- Blea Beck
- Smithy Sike
- Hag Sike
- Ettersgill Beck
- How Gill
- Stony Beck
- Bow Lee Beck
- Newbiggin Beck
- Mill Beck
- Unthank Beck
- Brockersgill Sike
- Owl Gill
- Stonygill Sike
- Park End Beck
- Crossthwaite Beck
- Hudeshope Beck

== Middleton-in-Teesdale to Barnard Castle ==
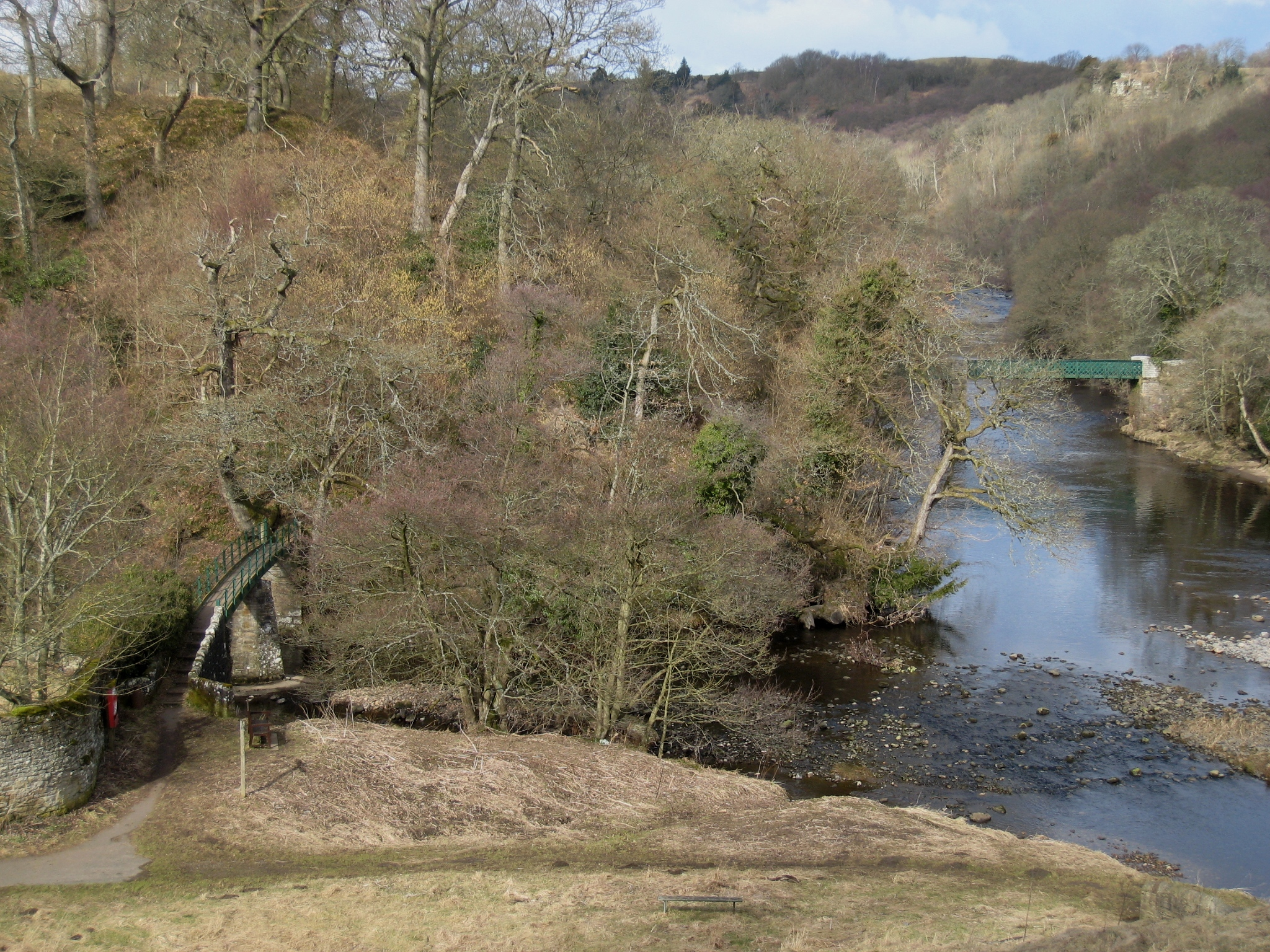
Confluence of River Balder (to the left) and River Tees

- River Lune
- Intake Sike
- Low Beck Springs
- Eggleston Burn
- Beer Beck
- Raygill Beck
- Wilden Beck
- River Balder
- Lance Beck
- Grise Beck
- Scur Beck
- Deepdale Beck
- Gill Beck

== Barnard Castle to Darlington ==
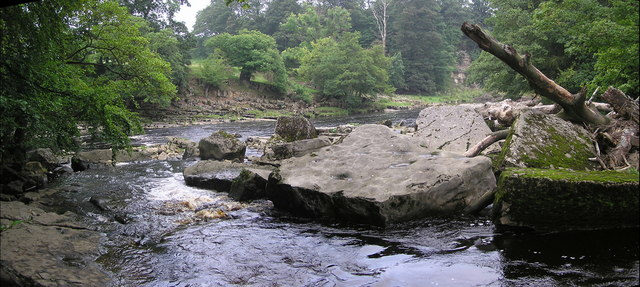
River Greta in foreground joining River Tees

- Thorsgill Beck
- River Greta
- Whorlton Beck
- Peg Beck
- Alwent Beck
- Black Beck
- Piercebridge Beck
- Ulnaby Beck
- Baydale Beck

== Darlington to Middlesbrough ==
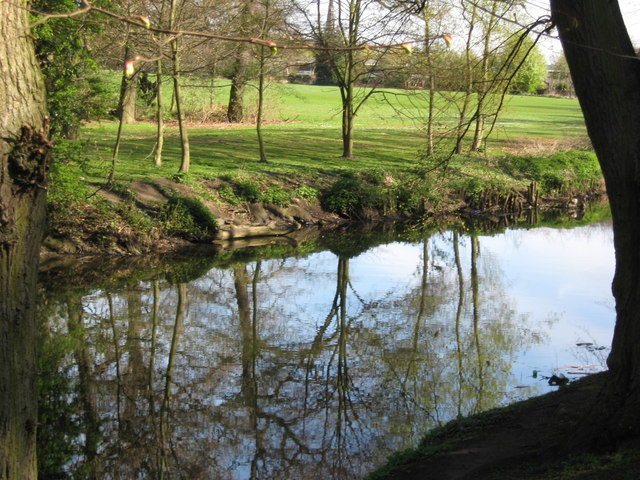
River Skerne flowing through South Park in Darlington

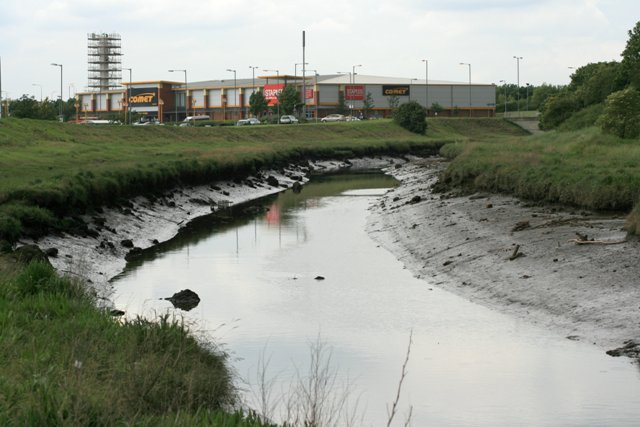
The Old River Tees after a cut was made to straighten the course of the River Tees

- Claw Beck
- River Skerne
- Spa Beck
- Dalton Beck
- Kent Beck
- Wood Head Gill
- Soursike Gill
- Staindale Beck
- Fardean Side
- Worsall Far Gill
- Worsall Gill
- Hole Beck
- Nelly Burden's Beck
- River Leven
- Bassleton Beck
- Old River Tees
- Lustrum Beck
- Billingham Beck
- Ormesby Beck
- Normanby Beck
- Greatham Creek
