= Barmpton =

Coordinates: 54.55626°N 1.51291°W

- Location within County Durham
- OS grid reference: NZ316180
- Unitary authority: Darlington
- Ceremonial county: County Durham
- Region: North East
- Country: England
- Sovereign state: United Kingdom
- Post town: DARLINGTON
- Postcode district: DL1
- Dialling code: 01325
- Police: Durham
- Fire: County Durham and Darlington
- Ambulance: North East
- UK Parliament: Darlington

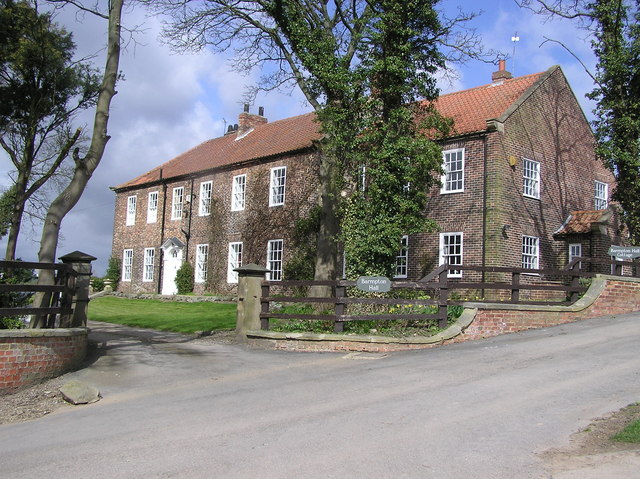
The late 18th century Barmpton Hall

Barmpton is a small village and civil parish in the borough of Darlington and the ceremonial county of County Durham, England. The population taken at the 2011 Census was less than 100. Details are maintained in the parish of Great Burdon. It is situated a short distance to the north-east of Darlington, on the River Skerne, a tributary of the Tees.
