= Hurworth School =

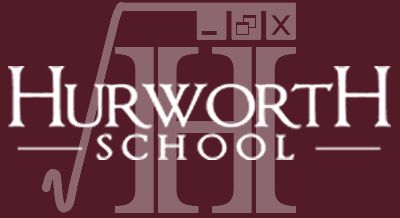

Location
- Croft Road; Hurworth-on-Tees, County Durham, DL2 2ET; England
- Coordinates: 54°29′00″N 1°32′27″W

Information
- Type: Academy
- Motto: Achieving Excellence with Care
- Trust: Swift Academies
- Department for Education URN: 136525 Tables
- Ofsted: Reports
- Head teacher: Rachel Somerville
- Gender: Coeducational
- Age: 11 to 16
- Website: http://www.hurworthschool.org.uk

Hurworth School is an coeducational secondary school located on Croft Road, Hurworth-on-Tees, in the borough of Darlington, England. It is part of the Swift Academies Multi Academy Trust. It is an over-subscribed 5 form entry comprehensive school, with accommodation for around 650 pupils in the 11 to 16 years age-range. Academic courses lead to examinations at GCSE level and substantial numbers of pupils move on to Higher Education. Pupils are drawn largely from the villages of Hurworth, Middleton St George and Neasham as well as from an area of south-east Darlington.

== History ==
On 1 April 2011, Hurworth School became an academy.

In September 2013, a new state of the art Sports Hall and Performing Arts Centre opened at the school following a year-long building project. The facility was officially opened by, then Middlesbrough FC manager, Tony Mowbray.

In 2017, Hurworth joined together with Longfield Academy and Rydal Academy to make the Swift Academy Trust.

Close by is Rockliffe Park, Middlesbrough FC training ground, and Rockliffe Hall, a hotel.
