= Thomas Le Mesurier (priest, born 1756) =

British lawyer, cleric, and polemicist

Rev. Thomas Le Mesurier (28 August 1756 – 14 July 1822) was a British lawyer, cleric, and polemicist.

He was born on Alderney, in the Channel Islands, the fourth son of John Le Mesurier, Hereditary Governor of that island. Educated at New College, Oxford (B.A. 1778, M.A. 1782 and B.D. 1813), he initially entered the legal profession and was called to the Bar in 1781. However, he moved into the Church of England, being ordained as a Deacon in 1794 and then a Priest in 1797. In 1799 he took up his first major position as Rector of Newton Longueville, Buckinghamshire. During this time, in 1807, he was chosen to be Bampton Lecturer and preached upon the Nature and Guilt of Schism. He left in 1812 to become Rector of St Andrew's Church, Haughton-le-Skerne, County Durham – a position he held until his death.

Le Mesurier was always close to the government of the day, and after Lord Sidmouth's short period as Prime Minister became his private chaplain, advising him on how he should combine the art of politics with adherence to the principles of the Established Church. He was a staunch opponent of Roman Catholic emancipation and produced many tracts refuting the position of Catholic campaigners such as John Milner. His political and religious views were strongly held, and in August 1820 it is reported in The Times that Le Mesurier "had thought proper to stop the mouth of [a] boy with his fist" when the fourteen-year-old in Haughton-le-Skerne shouted out his support for Lambton, a local government candidate. Le Mesurier escaped without sentence.

Le Mesurier married, in 1800, Margaret, daughter of Rev. Dr. James Bandinel of Netherbury, Dorset (a previous Bampton Lecturer), and had fifteen children by her. Fourteen survived him. The resultant drain on his income caused him to write to Lord Sidmouth in January 1822 asking for the prebendal stall at Westminster vacated by Dr Blomberg. Sidmouth could do nothing. Le Mesurier died within seven months and his widow died the next year, in May, leaving their orphaned children to grow up with uncles and an aunt on the Bandinel side.

His portrait was painted by Sir William Beechey, R.A.

== Publications ==
Date	Title	Publisher
1795	Translations, chiefly from the Italian of Petrarch and Metastasio, by Thomas Le Mesurier M.A.	Oxford
1799	Poems, chiefly sonnets, by the author of Translations from the Italian of Petrarch, Metastasio and Zappi	Oxford
1805	A serious examination of the Roman Catholic claims, as set forth in the petition now pending before Parliament	London
1806	A sermon preached before the Archdeacon of Buckingham at his visitation at Stoney Stratford	Oxford
1807	A sequel to the Serious examination into the Roman Catholic claims	London
1807	A reply to certain observations of Dr. Milner upon the Sequel to the Serious examination of the Roman Catholic claims	London
1808	The nature and guilt of schism considered (Bampton Lecture)	London
1809	Tracts on the Roman Catholic question	London
1809	The doctrines of predestination and assurance considered	London
1809	Supplement to the reply to Dr. Milner's observations	London
1810	On the authority of the Church and of the holy Scriptures	London
1810	The doctrine of the Eucharist considered	London
1812	A serious examination of the Roman Catholic claims (2nd ed.)	London
1813	A plain statement of the Roman Catholic question	London
1813	A counter address to the Protestants of Great Britain and Ireland; in answer to the address of C. Butler	London
1814	A sermon preached in the cathedral church at Durham	Durham
1815	The invocation of the Virgin Mary and of the saints... shewn to be superstitious and idolatrous	Durham
1817	God's dealings equal to all, a sermon preached on the occasion of the death of the Princess Charlotte	London
1820	Prayers to be used in visiting the sick	Oxford
1820	Two sermons preached on occasion of the death of George the third	Durham
1822	Considerations on the Bill now pending in Parliament, respecting the Roman Catholic peers	London
1823	Sermons	Oxford
