= William Emerson (mathematician) =

English mathematician

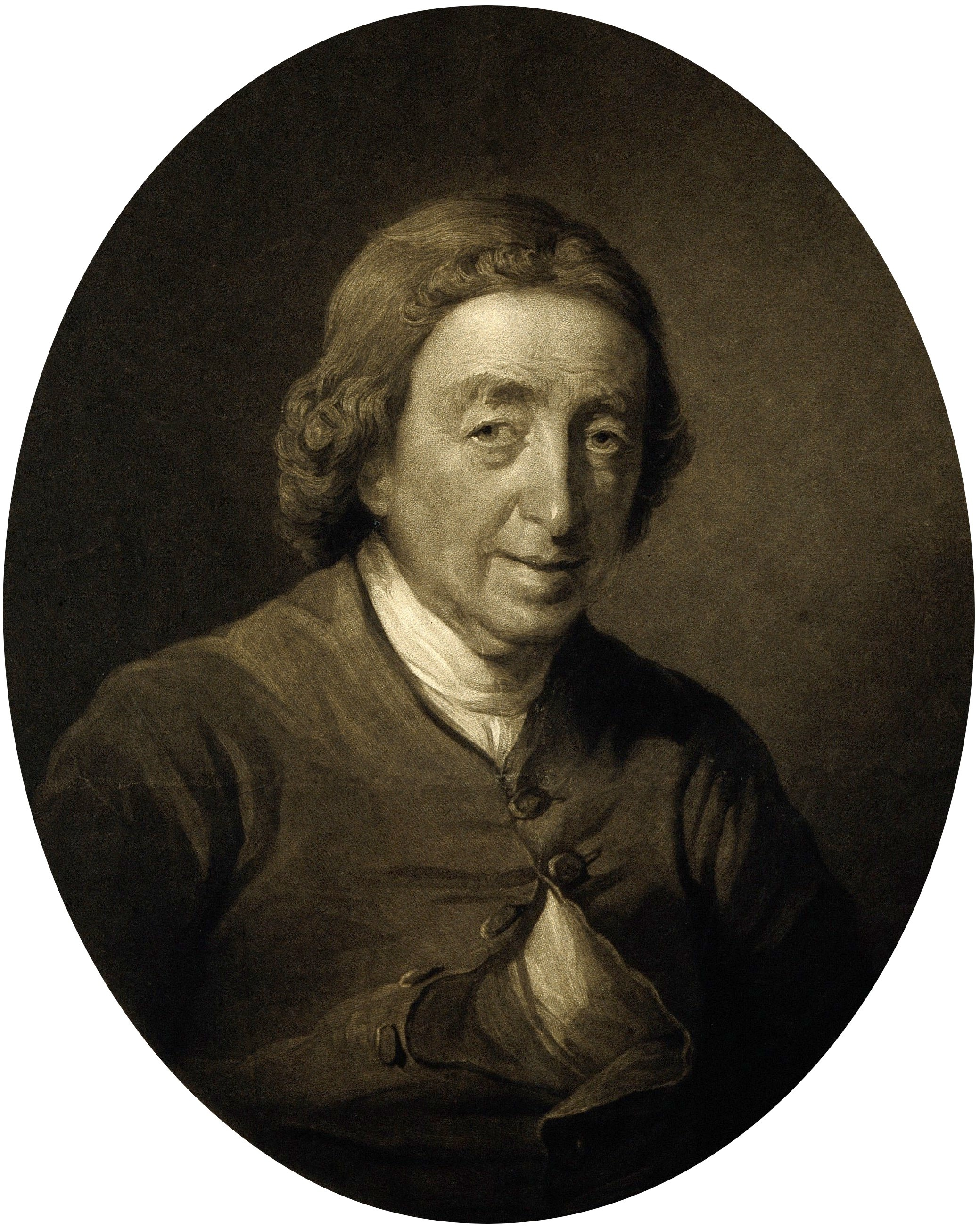
- Born: 14 May 1701; Hurworth
- Died: 20 May 1782 (aged 81)
- Scientific career
- Fields: mathematics

William Emerson (14 May 1701 – 20 May 1782) was an English mathematician. He was born in Hurworth, near Darlington, where his father, Dudley Emerson, also a mathematician, taught a school.

== Biography ==
William himself had a small estate in Weardale called Castle Gate situated not far from Eastgate where he would repair to work throughout the summer on projects as disparate as stonemasonry and watchmaking. Unsuccessful as a teacher, he devoted himself entirely to studious retirement. Emerson published many works which are singularly free from errata.

In The Principles of Mechanics (1754) he shows a wind-powered vehicle in which the vertically mounted propeller gives direct power to the front wheels via a system of cogs. In mechanics he never advanced a proposition which he had not previously tested in practice, nor published an invention without first proving its effects by a model. He was skilled in the science of music, the theory of sounds, and the ancient and modern scales; but he never attained any excellence as a performer. He died on 20 May 1782 at his native village, where his gravestone bears epitaphs in Latin and Hebrew.

Emerson dressed in old clothes and his manners were uncouth. He wore his shirt back to front and his legs wrapped in sacking so as not to scorch them as he sat over the fire. He declined an offer to become FRS because it would cost too much after all the expense of farthing candles he had been put to in the course of his life of study. Emerson rode regularly into Darlington on a horse like Don Quixote's, led by a hired small boy. In old age, plagued by the stone, he would alternately pray and curse, wishing his soul 'could shake off the rags of mortality without such a clitter-me-clatter.'

Like his fellow County Durham savant John Bird, Emerson makes an appearance in Mason and Dixon by Thomas Pynchon.

== Works ==
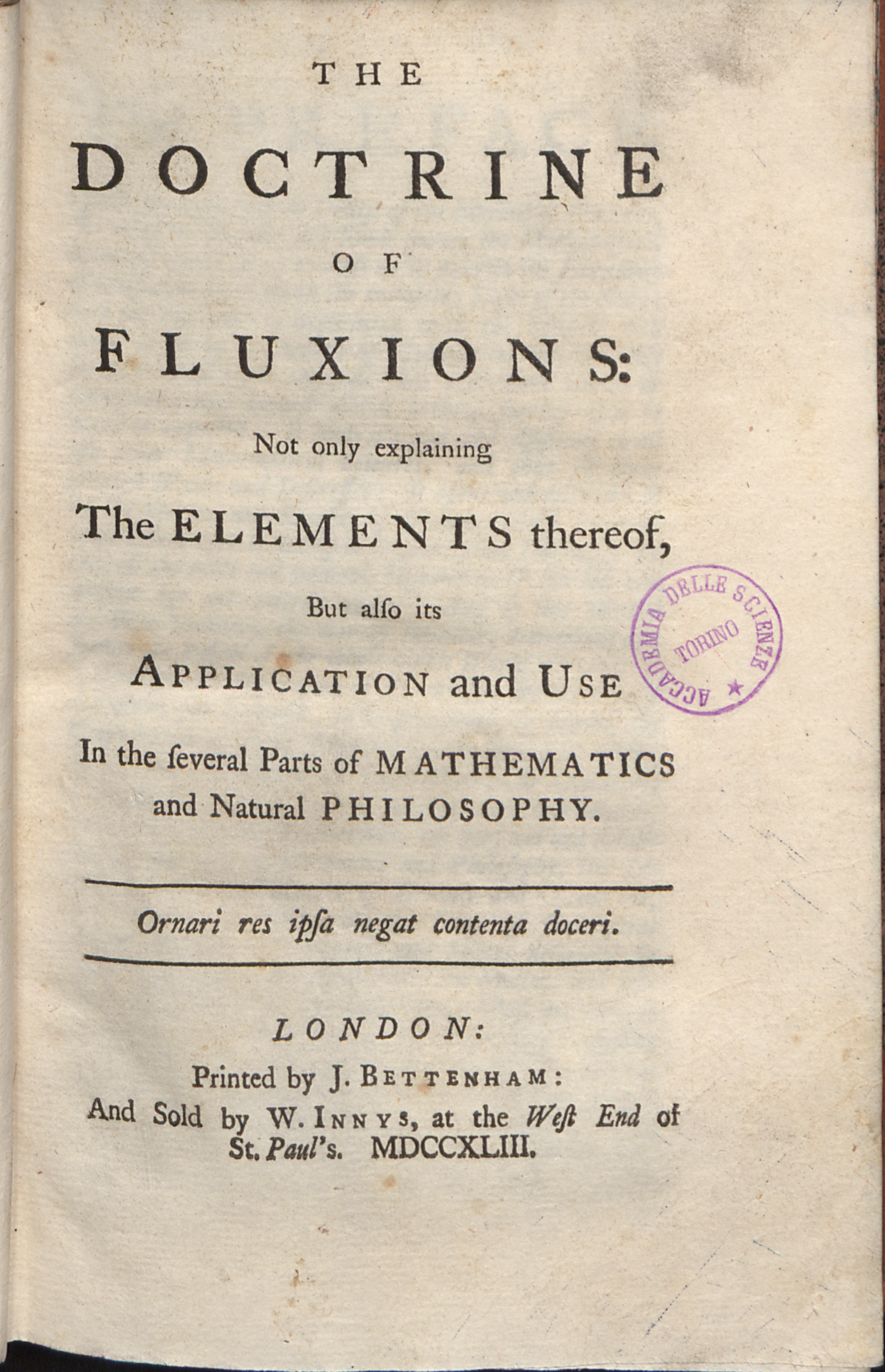
Doctrine of fluxions, 1743

Emerson's works include:

- The Doctrine of Fluxions (1748); 3rd edition (1768)
- The Projection of the Sphere, Orthographic, Stereographic and Gnomical (1749)
- The Elements of Trigonometry (1749); 3rd edition (1788)
- The Principles of Mechanics (1754); 3rd edition (1773)
- A Treatise of Navigation (1755)
- A Treatise of Algebra, in two books (1764)
- The Arithmetic of Infinites, and the Differential Method, illustrated by Examples (1767)
- Mechanics, or the Doctrine of Motion (1769)
- The Elements of Optics, in four books (1768)
- A System of Astronomy (1769)
- The Laws of Centripetal and Centrifugal Force (1769)
- The Mathematical Principles of Geography (1770)
- Tracts (1770)
- Cyclomathesis, or an Easy Introduction to the several branches of the Mathematics (1770), in ten volumes
- A Short Comment on Sir Isaac Newton's Principia; to which is added, A Defence of Sir Isaac against the objections that have been made to several parts of his works (1770)
- A Miscellaneous Treatise containing several Mathematical Subjects (1776).

He contributed to the mathematical journals of his day, but usually under a pseudonym.

It is notable to remark that in "The Doctrine of Proportionality" Emerson was first to introduce ∝ as the symbol for proportionality.

== Bibliography ==
- Gow, Rod (2006). "Letters of William Emerson and Francis Holliday to the publisher, John Nourse". Journal of the British Society for the History of Mathematics. 21 (1): 40–50. doi:10.1080/17498430600566626. ISSN 1749-8430. S2CID 121205983.
