= Hurworth Grange Community Centre =

Building in Durham, England

Coordinates: 54.4854°N 1.5419°W

Hurworth Grange Community Centre is a building in the village of Hurworth-on-Tees, Durham, England. Built in 1875, it has had a long and varied history, from private residence of a wealthy Quaker banking family to its modern-day use as a community centre.

== History ==
Hurworth Grange was constructed in Hurworth-on-Tees by Alfred Waterhouse, commissioned by Alfred Backhouse as a wedding gift for his nephew, James Edward Backhouse. The building is a large brick Victorian mansion that at one time boasted of a lovely rock garden created by the famous Backhouse nursery of Yorkshire.

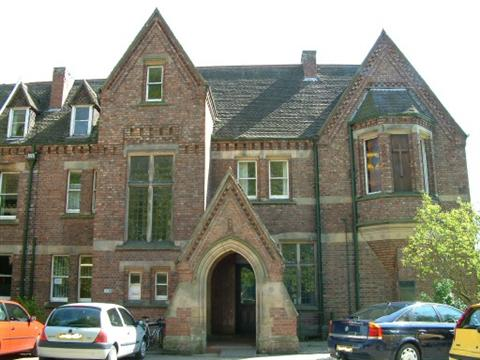
Hurworth Grange in 2005

Over the years the house changed hands, being used as a residence by the Rogerson family and then later the Spielman family. During World War II Jewish refugees were housed at Hurworth Grange and a military installation was set up in its grounds. In 1956 Brothers Hospitallers of St. John of God purchased Hurworth Grange to use as a Juniorate School. In 1967 the Juniorate School was closed and Hurworth Grange was purchased by the local Parish Council for use as a community centre.

== Hauntings ==
Regular patrons of the Hurworth Grange Community Centre have reported various types of paranormal activity occurring. In early 2005 Anomalous Phenomena Investigations (API), of Newcastle upon Tyne, Tyne and Wear, England, run by founders Colin & Cindy Nunn and Chris & Jo Carnegie, were granted exclusive privileges to investigate the alleged hauntings. In August 2006 the BBC North East and Cumbria crew filmed the team conducting an investigation at Hurworth Grange. The show aired on 30 October 2006 and was presented by Anna Nolan. API continues to conduct regular investigations at Hurworth Grange, with future plans to publish a book about their findings.
