= Jane Procter =

British headmistress, suffragist and temperance campaigner

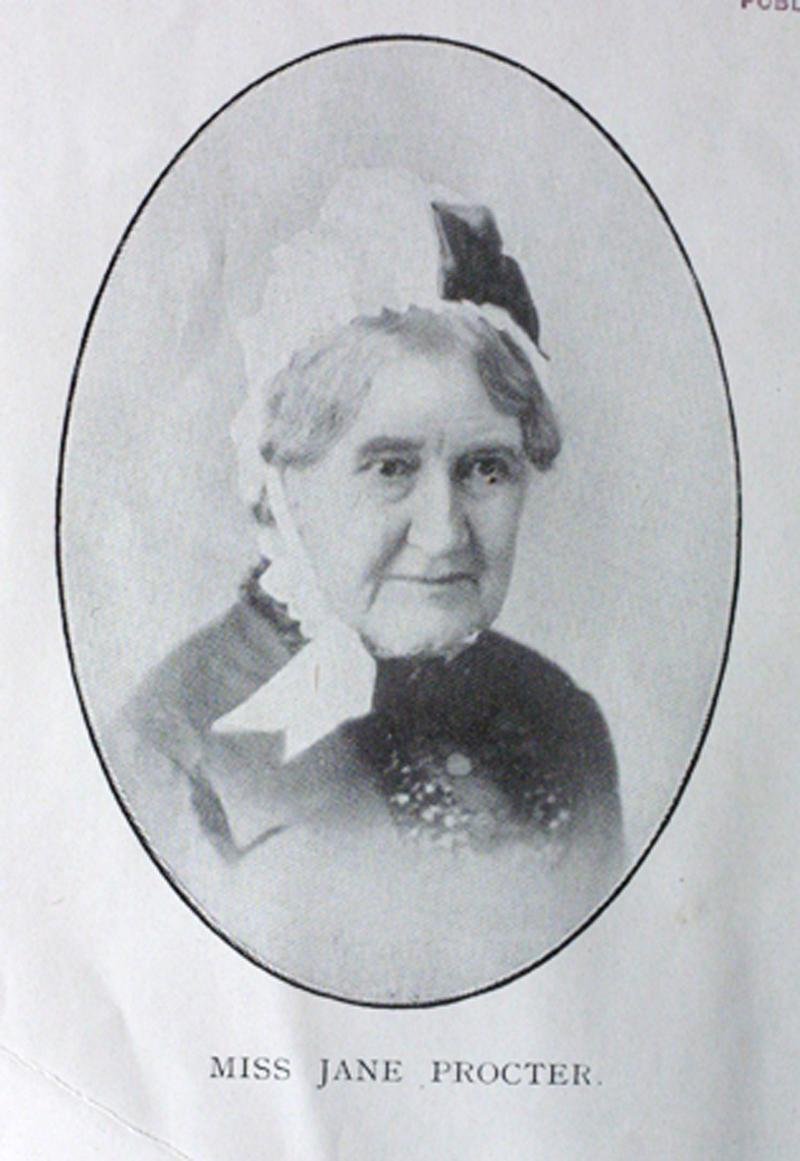
- Procter in c. 1870.
- Born: 2 November 1810; Kirklevington
- Died: 5 January 1882 (aged 71); Rome
- Occupation: headteacher
- Known for: founding schools including Polam Hall School

Jane Procter (2 November 1810 – 5 January 1882) was a British headmistress, suffragist and temperance campaigner. She founded what would become the Quaker Polam Hall School in Darlington.

== Life ==
Procter was born in Kirklevington. She was the eldest daughter of the four children of Elizabeth (born Thurnam) and James Procter. Her parents were Quakers who lived in Yarm but they later moved to Blackburn. In 1816 her father died and their mother moved the family to Yorkshire. Her own education was at Ackworth School which was a Quaker school open to both boys and girls. She offered a job as a teacher there but chose to leave and teach in Doncaster. When she was eighteen she found herself head of a family as her mother had died. She returned to the family home and a Quaker couple came to live with the family until they decided that she could cope with the responsibility.

Jane Proctor founded her first school in Selby which lasted for twenty years. Her ambitions turned to the nearby town of Darlington which was expanding due to the railway. She founded "Selby School" in 1848 as a boarding school for girls at Number 11 Townhouse, in Houndgate helped by her sisters Elizabeth and Barbara. The school moved to become Polam Hall School after six years with Jane as the head. Arthur Pease, became Polam Hall's new owner in 1878.

In 1850 she and her sister Elizabeth founded the "Darlington Women's Temperance Association" which met at the school.

In 1866 a petition in support of giving women the vote was raised for presentation to parliament. Both Jane and her sister Elizabeth signed the petition. There was about 1,500 signatures on the petition and it was used in support of John Stuart Mill's defeated proposal that the second reform bill should use the word "person" rather than "man" to define a voter.

Procter died suddenly in Rome and she was buried there. A group of her ex-students arranged for a memorial to be placed there. Polam Hall school was still running in 2013, when the school announced its intention to convert from a private to a free school in 2015.
