= River Skerne =

River in County Durham, England

Coordinates: 54°29′N 1°33′W

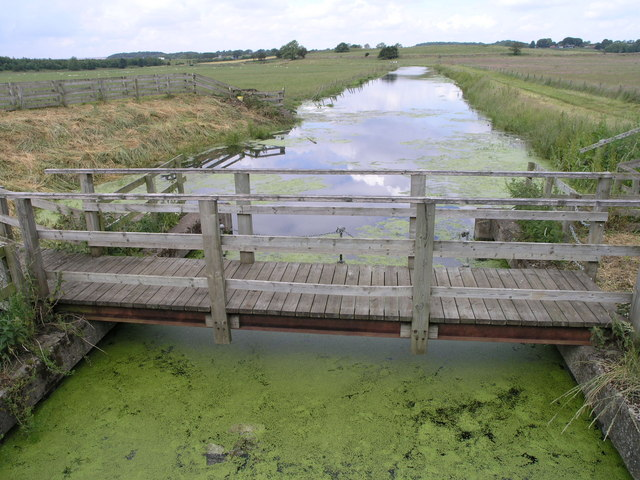
Skerne river dam looking north

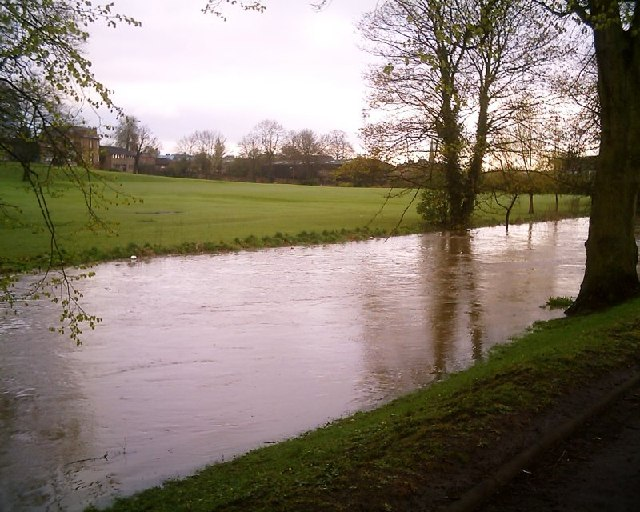
River Skerne in flood, April 2005

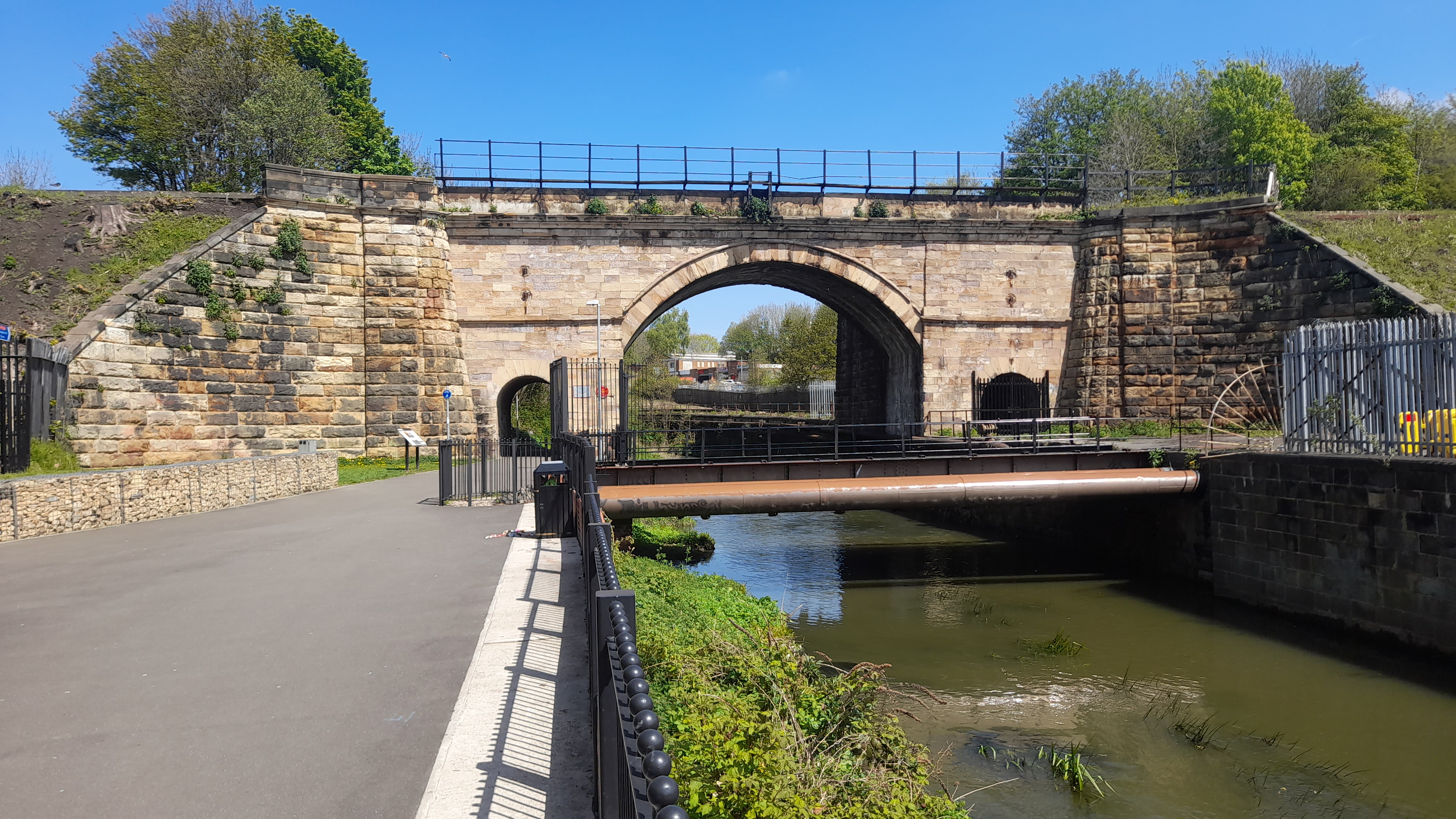
S&DR bridge of 1825; the side retaining walls are later additions

The River Skerne is a tributary of the River Tees. It flows through County Durham in England.

== Course ==
The Skerne is about 25 miles (40 km) long and begins in Magnesian Limestone hills between Trimdon and Trimdon Grange and ends at Hurworth Place where it joins the River Tees. Three miles after the source the Skerne is joined by Hurworth Burn and enters Hurworth Burn Reservoir on the borders of Stockton-on-Tees and County Durham. On leaving the reservoir, the Skerne heads south-west towards Sedgefield. It flows through farmland between Fishburn and Sedgefield and it seems likely that the Skerne is "the fish-stream" that gives Fishburn its name.

Three miles west of Fishburn, it is crossed by the A1(M) motorway near Bradbury interchange. At this point the Skerne takes a southerly course and, for about five miles (8 km) as far south as Aycliffe, it runs roughly parallel to the motorway and the East Coast Main Line. A number of smaller tributaries join the Skerne in the area and often form little islands like the Great Isle and Little Isle near Bradbury. One major tributary of the Skerne is the Woodham Burn, which rises near Shildon and flows through Newton Aycliffe.

The Skerne skirts the village of Aycliffe before crossing under the motorway near its junction with the A167. After this it passes close to Brafferton and the farmland where the famous Durham Ox was bred, before heading for Barmpton, Great Burdon and Haughton-le-Skerne on the outskirts of Darlington, The Skerne then flows underneath 17 bridges in Darlington, including the railway bridge built by the Stockton and Darlington Railway and crossed by the inaugural train in 1825. The river lends its name to the Skerne Park estate in Darlington.

To the south of Darlington the Skerne passes through South Park, and then, after flowing under the A66 bridge, leaves the town to flow through countryside for its last two miles (3 km), before joining the Tees at Hurworth Place.

== Settlements ==
from source

- Fishburn
- Bishop Middleham
- Bradbury
- Newton Aycliffe
- Aycliffe Village
- Brafferton
- Barmpton
- Great Burdon
- Haughton-le-Skerne
- Darlington
- Hurworth Place

(Joins River Tees)

== Restoration ==
The River Skerne underwent a comprehensive restoration scheme between 1995 and 1998 as part of an EU-LIFE demonstration project carried out by the River Restoration Project (now The River Restoration Centre). A 2 km stretch of the river running through the town of Darlington was improved including the formation of four new meanders, planting to strengthen banks, reshaping and narrowing of the bed, installation of footpaths and a planting scheme aimed to "bringing the countryside into town".

== See also ==
- List of rivers of Great Britain
