= HMS Neasham =

Minesweeper of the Royal Navy

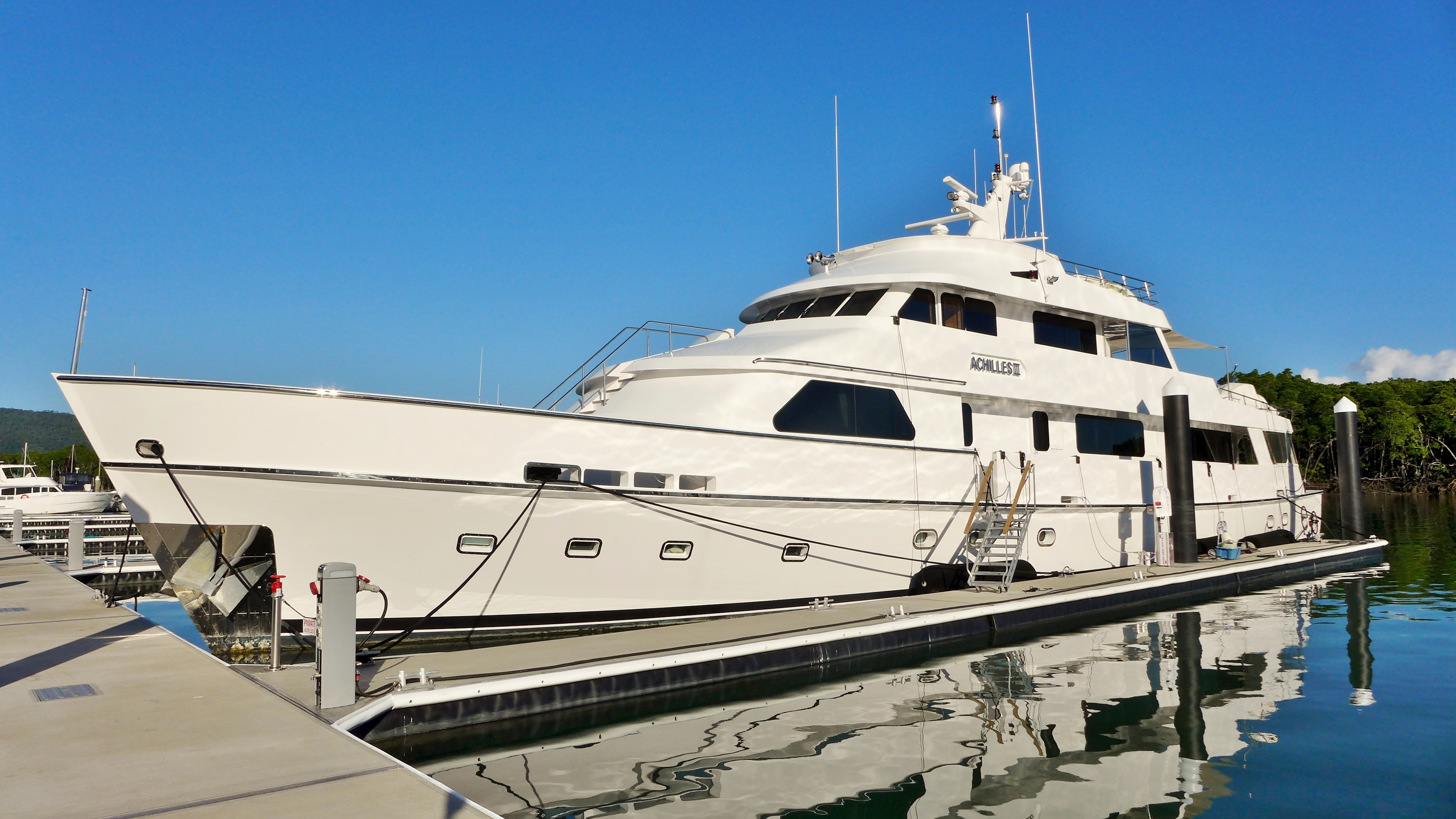
- The ship as Achilles III, 2015

History

United Kingdom
- Name: HMS Neasham
- Namesake: Neasham
- Builder: J. Samuel White
- Launched: 14 March 1956
- Completed: 15 November 1957
- Fate: Transferred to Australia 1968
- Notes: Pennant number(s): M2712 / IMS49

Australia
- Name: HMAS Porpoise
- Acquired: 1968
- Fate: Sold 1989

Australia
- Name: Achilles III
- Acquired: 1989
- Identification: MMSI number: 503016200; Callsign: VJ9247
- Status: In service

General characteristics
- Class & type: Ham-class minesweeper
- Displacement: 120 tons standard; 164 tons full
- Length: 106 ft 6 in (32.46 m)
- Beam: 22 ft (6.7 m)
- Draught: 5 ft 9 in (1.75 m)
- Propulsion: 2 shaft Paxman 12YHAXM diesels, 1,100 bhp (820 kW)
- Speed: 14 knots (26 km/h)
- Complement: 2 officers, 13 ratings
- Armament: 1 × 40 mm Bofors / 20 mm Oerlikon gun

HMS Neasham (M2712/IMS49) was a Ham-class minesweeper for the Royal Navy. The names of the Ham-class vessels were all chosen from villages ending in -ham. HMS Neasham was named after Neasham in County Durham.

Despite being completed on 15 November 1957, Neasham was held in operational reserve in a land cradle at Rosneath on the Clyde until 1967. She was then transferred to the Royal Australian Navy, arriving in Sydney as deck cargo on the merchant ship Gladstone Star on 29 July 1968.

After a period at the RAN base at Garden Island, New South Wales, Neasham was converted into a diving tender and renamed HMAS Porpoise (DTV 1002/Y.280) on 13 June 1973. Porpoise was sold in 1989 to property developer Keith Williams, owner of Sea World on the Gold Coast, Queensland, Australia. She was later converted into a luxury motor yacht and renamed Achilles III.
