= Frances Simpson =

English writer and cat fancier (1857-1926)

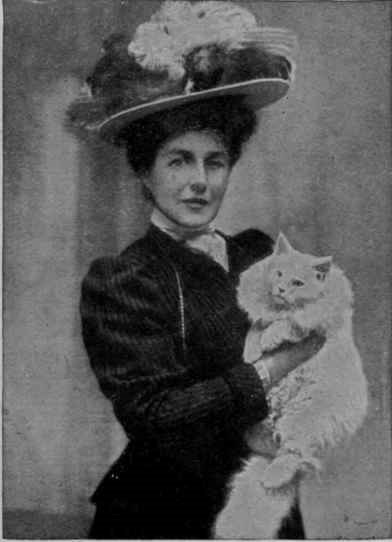
- Simpson in 1910
- Born: ca. 1857; Haughton-le-Skerne, County Durham, England
- Died: 19 January 1926; Kensington, England
- Other name: Possibly used pen names
- Occupations: non-fiction writer; journalist; cat show judge; cat breeder
- Notable work: Cats and All about Them; The book of the cat

Frances Simpson (ca. 1857 – 1926) was an English writer, journalist, cat show judge, and cat breeder. She was a fervent supporter of blue Persians, which she promoted, notably by exhibiting her pair at the Crystal Palace, and for having written The Book of the Cat (1903).

== Early life ==
Census records show that Elizabeth Frances Ann Simpson was born in Haughton-le-Skerne, County Durham, England, around 1857. She was the third of six children born to the Reverend Robert James Simpson and his wife Mary Elizabeth, between 1853 and 1870. She was predeceased by her brother Robert Arthur, in 1853 and brother Harry W, in 1857, and followed by John Percy in 1861 and younger sisters Grace Helen Mary and Edith born in 1868 and 1870 respectively. Her father was listed as curate of Haughton-le-Skerne in the 1861 census. In 1871, when she was 14, it is highly likely that she was already residing with her family in London, as it is known from her writings that she attended the first and most famous Crystal Palace Cat Show, held in Sydenham, London, in July 1871, organized and judged by Harrison Weir, then aged 47.

== Career ==
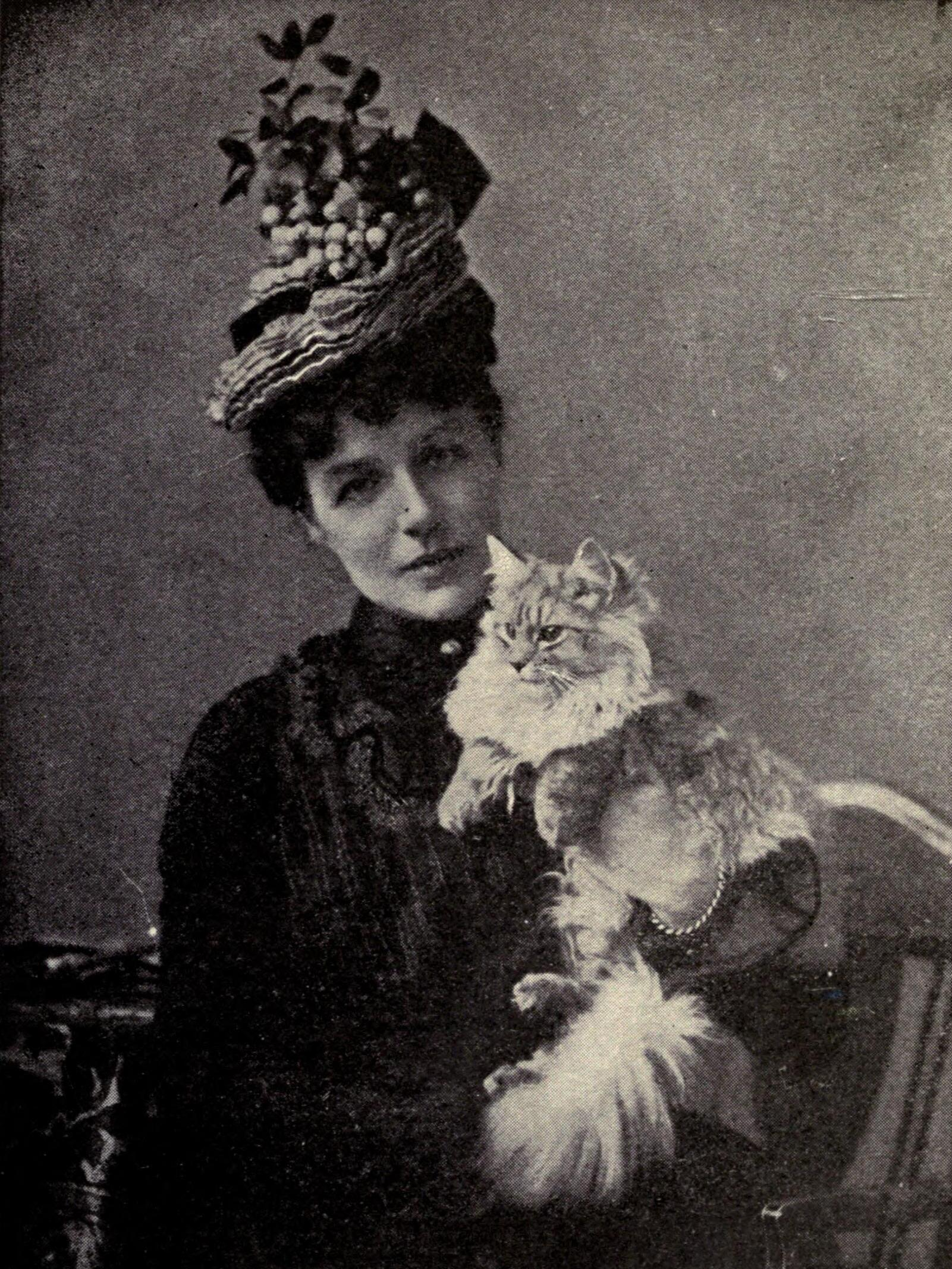
Simpson in 1902

Simpson wrote numerous books and articles on cats, often used to trace feline history. Simpson appears to have been subsidized mainly through her writing, including articles and commentaries in Fur and Feather and later, Our Cats, but also by other publishers, undoubtedly presenting herself as a rising expert on domestic felines and their many varieties. As a young judge active on the cat and cat show scene, this helped give her credence. By this time, she had behind her a number of best-selling publications, one of which had been reprinted, and was regularly producing specialist speeches on breed varieties for periodicals, such as Every woman's encyclopaedia, in which she wrote about the manx, Persian, and others. She may also have written for a number of years under pseudonyms.

Cats and all about them

The book of the cat

As a historian, she is cited for having seen the first cat shows at the Crystal Palace. Simpson was also a show director, a respected judge, and a mentor to new judges. Her books on cat breeding contained a wealth of advice on breeding, judging and show organization, as well as warnings to exhibitors who sent cats in unsuitable containers. She served on several club committees. She was a prolific writer and had an advice column in the weekly magazine Fur and Feather. She made copies of pedigrees for other breeders, corresponding with cat lovers in Britain and North America. She also exported Persians and encouraged other breeders to do the same, to the U.S. where cat breeding was in its infancy and quality breeding stock commanded considerable sums. She was honorary secretary of most of the early cat clubs, including the Blue Persian Society and the National Cat Club.

== Personal life ==
She died in Kensington, on 19 January 1926, aged 68.

== Selected works ==
- Cats and All about Them (1902) (text)
- The book of the cat (1903) (text)

== See also ==
- Cat fancy
