= Haughton-le-Skerne =

Village in County Durham, England

Coordinates: 54.5422°N 1.5148°W

Haughton Le Skerne
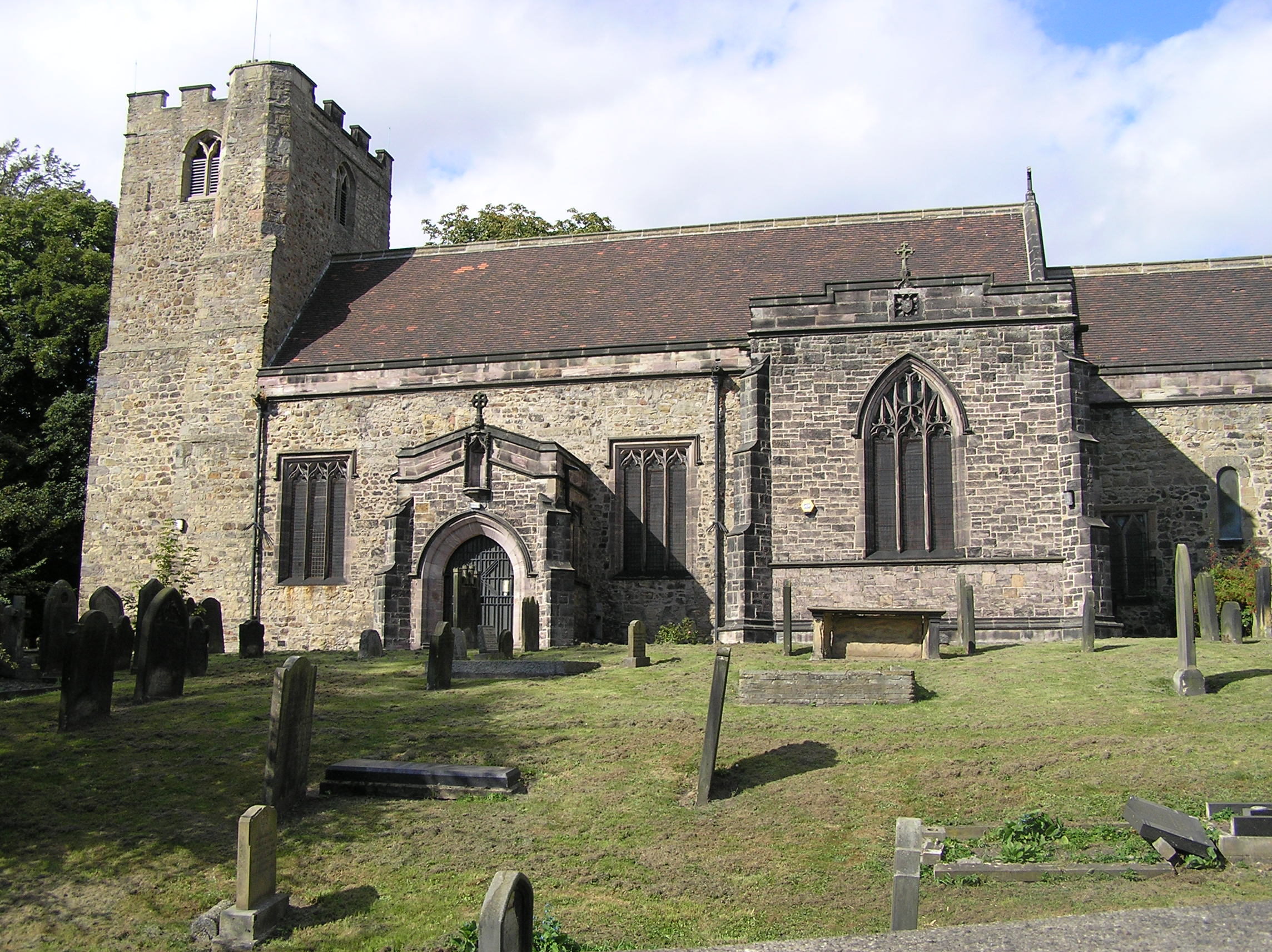
- St Andrew's Church, Haughton-le-Skerne

- Location within County Durham
- OS grid reference: NZ314164
  - London: 252mi
- Unitary authority: Darlington
- Ceremonial county: Durham
- Region: North East
- Country: England
- Sovereign state: United Kingdom
- Post town: DARLINGTON
- Postcode district: DL1
- Dialling code: 01325
- Police: Durham
- Fire: County Durham and Darlington
- Ambulance: North East
- UK Parliament: Darlington

Haughton-le-Skerne is a village in the borough of Darlington in the ceremonial county of Durham, England. It is situated in the north east of Darlington. The village lies to the west of the River Skerne. At the centre of the village green, is the main road towards Darlington town centre going across the river, south of the church. There used to be a linen mill on the riverbank on the east side of the village. Part of the mill leat can still be seen today.

St Andrew's Church at the west end of the village green is the oldest church in Darlington, circa 1125. Some of the stones may have originated in a previous church on the same site.

Parts of the existing rectory have monastic ruins built into the foundation and some inner walls, speculated to be evidence of an earlier building on this site.

On the north side of Haughton-le-Skerne, a turnpike led over the river to the ports on the Tees estuary, carrying traffic including salt from the Bishop's salt mines.

Haughton-le-Skerne is now connected to a large suburb of Darlington, with areas including Springfield and Whinfield.

The community was referred to in the ITV series Downton Abbey as it was the location where Mrs. Beryl Patmore (Lesley Nicol) would find a cottage which would serve as a boarding house, and when she retired, would serve as her home for her retirement days.

John Wrightson (1840-1916), founder of Downton Agricultural College and great grandfather of Downton writer Julian Fellowes was born in the village.

== Governance ==
In 1921 the civil parish had a population of 664. On 1 October 1930 the parish was abolished and merged with Darlington and Barmpton. It is now in the unparished area of Darlington.

== Notable people ==
- Frances Simpson (ca. 1857 - 1926), English writer, journalist, cat show judge, and cat breeder
