= St Andrew's Church, Haughton-le-Skerne =

St Andrew's Church
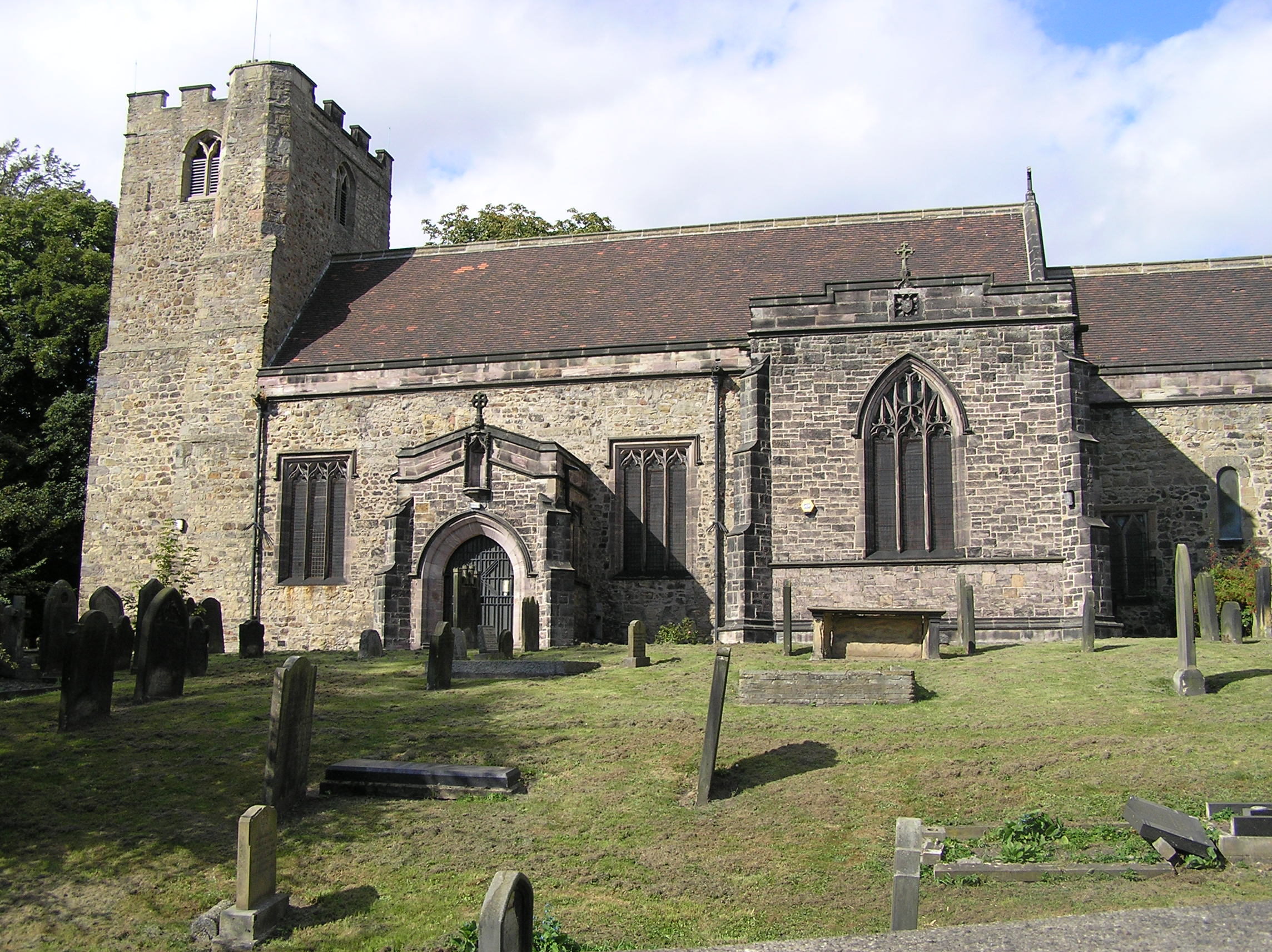
- St Andrew's Church
- 54.53731°N 1.525083°W
- OS grid reference: NZ 30827 15886
- Location: Haughton Road/Salters Lane South, Haughton-le-Skerne, County Durham, DL1 2DD
- Country: England
- Denomination: Church of England
- Churchmanship: Open Evangelical
- Website: Church website

History
- Status: Active

Architecture
- Functional status: Parish church
- Completed: Circa 1100

Administration
- Diocese: Diocese of Durham
- Archdeaconry: Archdeaconry of Auckland
- Deanery: Darlington
- Parish: Haughton le Skerne

Clergy
- Rector: The Revd Mark East

St Andrew's Church is a Church of England parish church in Haughton-le-Skerne, Darlington, County Durham. The church is a Grade I listed building.

== History ==
The church was originally built in the 12th century and restored in the 15th century. In 1795, it was expanded with the addition of transepts, a vestry and a south porch. Notable original features include Norman windows, pews, a pulpit and lectern that date to 1662 (the year of the Act of Uniformity), and a 15th-century font cover. It is the oldest church in Darlington.

=== Present day ===
On 28 April 1952, the church was designated a Grade I listed building.

From 1993 to 2009, St Andrew's was associated with a church plant in a local school: having been closed because of a lack of leadership, the plant merged back into St Andrew's. The church stands in the Open Evangelical tradition of the Church of England.

== Notable clergy ==
- Bulkeley Bandinel, Bodley's Librarian, was rector from 1822 to 1855.
- Eleazar Duncon served as rector from 1633 until stripped of his church appointments during the English Civil War.
- Thomas Le Mesurier, noted polemicist, was rector from 1812 to 1822.
- Joanna Penberthy, the first female bishop in the Church in Wales, served as a deaconess in this parish from 1984 to 1985.
- Noel Proctor, chaplain to HM Prison Manchester during the 1990 Strangeways Prison riot, served his curacy here from 1964 to 1967.
- John Wallis, antiquary and local historian, was a temporary curate in 1775.
