= Rockliffe Park =

English sport training facilities

Rockcliffe Park
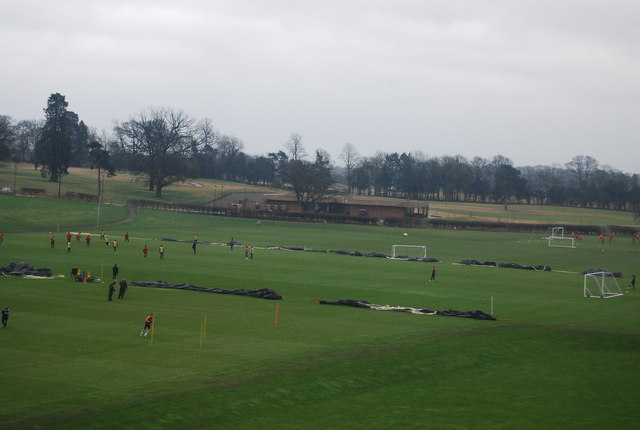
- Middlesbrough training ground
- Interactive map of Rockcliffe Park
- Location: Hurworth-on-Tees; County Durham
- Coordinates: 54.4787°N 1.5482°W
- Owner: Middlesbrough
- Type: Sports training facility

Construction
- Opened: 29 October 1998
- Cost: Total: £7 million

Tenant
- Middlesbrough

Rockliffe Park near Hurworth, County Durham, is Middlesbrough Football Club's training facility and sports complex.

== History of Rockliffe Park ==
=== Early years (1863-1996) ===
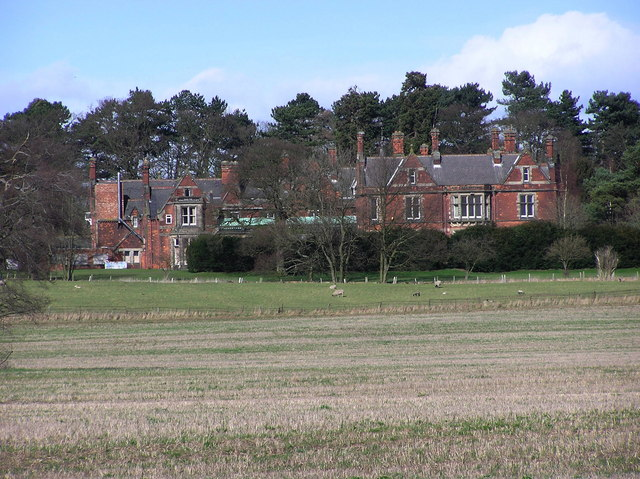
The original 1863 Rockliffe Hall, as seen in 2006

In 1863, Arthur Backhouse (a member of the Quaker banking family of Darlington) built Rockliffe Hall, then known as Pilmore Hall. The grounds and hall were then sold off to Lord Southampton and used as a command headquarters during World War II. The estate was then split amongst the family and then sold to the Brothers Hospitallers of St. John of God in 1948. The brothers built St Cuthbert's Hospital, and remained there until the Order moved to nearby Scorton in 1991.

=== Ownership by Middlesbrough F.C. (1997–present) ===
Following a period in which the area had been unused, Middlesbrough purchased Rockliffe Park in 1997. Following extensive research including visiting the academies of clubs like AFC Ajax, Middlesbrough finally developed Rockliffe Park training complex. It was constructed by Riverside Stadium builders Taylor Woodrow and cost £7 million. The complex was officially opened on 29 October 1998 by British Prime Minister Tony Blair, within whose Sedgefield constituency it was located.

Following heavy rain in early September 2008, part of the Rockcliffe training complex flooded after the River Tees broke its banks, leaving an area the size of four football pitches under four feet of water.
Billingham Synthonia and their reserve team also use the training facilities at Rockliffe.

== Facilities ==
Rockliffe Park training complex currently resides in a 160-acre (0.65 km^{2}) site. There are 8 full size pitches.

The complex is used for Academy and Reserve team games by the football club as well as for training purposes. Indeed, England trained at the complex prior to their Euro 2004 qualifying match at the Riverside Stadium against Slovakia in 2003.

== Golf course ==
In October 2006, Middlesbrough Football Club (in association with Rockcliffe Hall Developments) acquired 4 square kilometres of farmland adjacent to Rockliffe Hall.

The club subsequently announced plans to build a £50 million golf course, including a luxury hotel at Rockliffe Hall and residential accommodation, and planning permission was given by Darlington Borough Council on 12 December 2006. The course would open in 2009.
