= Nathaniel John Winch =

Nathaniel John Winch (1768–1838) was an English merchant and botanist, known also as a lichenologist and geologist.

== Life ==
He was the son of Nathaniel Winch, born at Hampton, Middlesex. He was elected a fellow of the Linnean Society in 1803 and an associate in 1821. For more than twenty years he acted as secretary to the Newcastle Infirmary. Elected sheriff of Newcastle upon Tyne in 1805, he suffered bankruptcy in 1808.

Winch died at his residence, Ridley Place, Newcastle, on 5 May 1838, aged 69. His manuscripts, library, and herbarium of some twelve thousand species were left to the Linnean Society, but most of them passed to the Natural History Society of Northumberland and Durham, and the Hancock Museum. His name was commemorated by De Candolle in the genus Winchia.

== Works ==
Winch spent a lifetime in the study of plants, especially those of Northumberland, Cumberland and County Durham, and was a pioneer writer on geographical distribution. He studied cryptogams, especially mosses, as well as flowering plants. His major publications were:

- The Botanist's Guide through … Northumberland and Durham, 1805–7, 2 vols., written with John Thornhill and Richard Waugh, arranged according to the Linnean system and including cryptogams.
- Observations on the Geology of Northumberland and Durham, 1814.
- Essay on the Geographical Distribution of Plants through … Northumberland, Cumberland, and Durham, 1819; 2nd ed. 1825.
- Remarks on the Flora of Cumberland, 1825, contributed to the Newcastle Magazine during the preceding year, and reprinted as *Contributions to the Flora of Cumberland, 1833.
- Flora of Northumberland and Durham, 1831; reprinted from the Transactions of the Natural History Society of Northumberland, Durham, and Newcastle, to which addenda were issued in 1836.

The standard author abbreviation Winch is used to indicate this person as the author when citing a botanical name.
