= Hurworth House School =

Location
- The Green; Hurworth-on-Tees, County Durham; England; 54°29′10″N 1°31′42″W

Information
- Motto: Fortuna Iuvat Fortes (Fortune Favors the Bold)
- Established: 1946
- Closed: 2010
- Age: 2 to 16

Hurworth House School was a non-selective independent school located in Hurworth-on-Tees, in the borough of Darlington, England. There were approximately 130 pupils on the school roll, aged 4–16, as of July 2010.

On Tuesday 29 June 2010 it was announced that Polam Hall proposals had fallen through and that Hurworth House was to close for good. The site of the school is now home to a special educational school of the same name, which opened in 2011.

== History ==
Hurworth House School was founded in 1946 as a private preparatory boarding school for boys. It was founded by Lorimer Thomas as a boys school.

For the first fifty years of its history, Hurworth House established and maintained an enviable reputation for preparing boys for Common Entrance into public school.

In 1994, however, the Governing Board took the decision to extend the age range of the school to 18 and to offer the full range of GCSE and, with sister school Polam Hall, AS and A- Level subjects to the boys in its care. This decision arose essentially at the instigation of many parents who wanted the outstanding education that their sons had thus far enjoyed up to the age of thirteen to continue for the full duration of their school careers.

The first group of students to sit the GCSE examination more than justified that decision, and Hurworth House headed the local schools' examination league tables in that year.

== House system ==
The school had four houses: Carroll, Emerson, Stephenson and Wycliffe. The houses were named after famous historical figures with a local connection. All pupils were allocated to one of the houses upon enrolment. Each week a cup was awarded in the Junior and Senior schools for the house that had acquired the most house points during the previous week.

House Points, known as "good marks" amongst pupils, were awarded to pupils for either good work or good behaviour. If a student received 3 good marks, they would be awarded a Good Ticket; it was these Good Tickets that counted towards the house cup. If a student's work or behaviour was unacceptable, he or she would be given a "bad mark"; a student receiving three bad marks would get a lunchtime detention, and a point would be deducted from the house total this week.

The four houses also competed in a number of inter-house sporting events, including but not limited to: cross country running, rugby, football, swimming and athletics.

== School organisation ==
The school was divided into three groups: nursery, junior school and senior school.

=== Nursery ===
The nursery was open to boys and girls between the ages of two and a half and four.

=== Junior school ===
The junior school was open to boys between the ages of four and eleven, with the following class structure:

Form	Age
Reception	4-5
J1	5-6
J2	6-7
J3	7-8
J4	8-9
J5	9-10
J6	10-11

=== Senior school ===
The senior school was made up of boys between the ages of eleven and sixteen, with the following class structure:

Form	Age
F1	11-12
F2	12-13
F3	13-14
F4	14-15
F5	15-16

=== Sixth form ===
The school did offer a sixth form for those boys that wished to stay on to complete their A-Levels. Although it was necessary for boys to attend Hurworth House’s sister school Polam Hall based in Darlington. Uptake was never particularly high, therefore Hurworth House decided to cease to offer this option.
