= Ovington, County Durham =

Village in County Durham, England

Coordinates: 54.52741°N 1.79828°W

Ovington
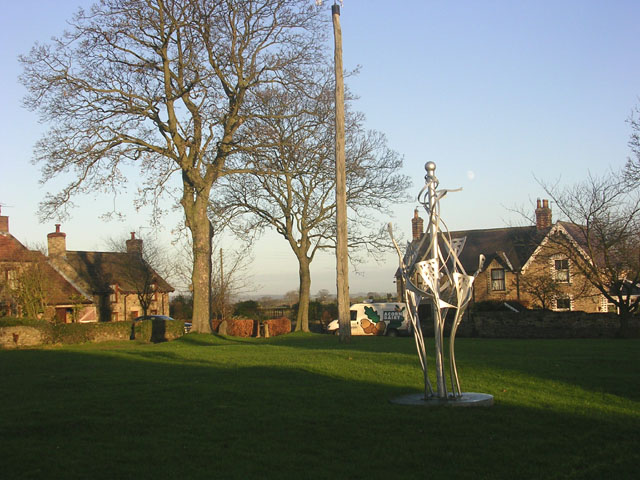
- Ovington

- Location within County Durham
- Population: 217 (2011 including Barforth)
- OS grid reference: NZ131146
- Unitary authority: County Durham
- Ceremonial county: County Durham
- Region: North East
- Country: England
- Sovereign state: United Kingdom
- Post town: Richmond
- Postcode district: DL11
- Police: Durham
- Fire: County Durham and Darlington
- Ambulance: North East
- UK Parliament: Bishop Auckland

Ovington is a village and civil parish in County Durham, England. Situated 8 miles (13 km) east of Barnard Castle. Lying within the historic boundaries of the North Riding of Yorkshire, the village along with the rest of the former Startforth Rural District has been administered with County Durham since 1 April 1974, under the provisions of the Local Government Act 1972.

== History ==
The remnants of an Iron Age hillfort known as Cockshot Camp are located less than a mile west of the village.

In 1870-72, John Marius Wilson's Imperial Gazetteer of England and Wales described Ovington as:

"a township in Forcett parish, N. R. Yorkshire; on the river Tees, at the boundary with Durham, 5 miles S E by E of Barnard-Castle. Acres, 530. Real property, £851. Pop., 142. Houses, 34. A Gilbertine priory was founded here, by Alan de Wilton, in the time of King John; but has left no traces. There are remains of a small ancient camp."

== Governance ==
Ovington was part of the local government district of Teesdale from 1974 before it was abolished as part of the 2009 structural changes to local government in England. For the purposes of Durham County Council elections, Ovington is located in the Barnard Castle East ward.

The village lies within the Bishop Auckland parliamentary constituency.

== Culture and community ==
One of Ovington's distinguishable landmarks is a 60 ft high maypole situated on the village green and an integral part of the village's annual May Day celebrations. The original maypole was erected in 1897 to commemorate the diamond jubilee of Queen Victoria, it became a grade II listed structure in 1987, in 2006 the pole was replaced after costs to maintain the original structure had become too high, in November 2015, high winds caused the maypole to snap however by September 2016 it had been replaced, and sections of the former maypole were crafted into benches on the green.

The village has one public house, The Four Alls, which dates back over 200 years, and a village hall, in which the parish council conducts their meetings.
