= Great Burdon =

Village in County Durham, England

Coordinates: 54.542217°N 1.510184°W

- Location within County Durham
- Population: 211 (including Barmpton. 2011)
- OS grid reference: NZ317165
- Unitary authority: Darlington
- Ceremonial county: County Durham
- Region: North East
- Country: England
- Sovereign state: United Kingdom
- Post town: DARLINGTON
- Postcode district: DL1
- Police: Durham
- Fire: County Durham and Darlington
- Ambulance: North East

Great Burdon is a village in the borough of Darlington and the ceremonial county of County Durham, England. It is situated to the north-east of Darlington.
