= Neasham =

Coordinates: 54.48793°N 1.49332°W

- Location within County Durham
- Population: 376 (Including Sockburn. 2011)
- OS grid reference: NZ329104
- Unitary authority: Darlington
- Ceremonial county: County Durham
- Region: North East
- Country: England
- Sovereign state: United Kingdom
- Post town: Darlington
- Postcode district: DL2
- Police: Durham
- Fire: County Durham and Darlington
- Ambulance: North East
- UK Parliament: Sedgefield

The Tees at Neasham

Neasham is a village approximately four miles to the south east of Darlington in County Durham, England.

== Geography and recreation ==
The village sits on the banks of the River Tees which, at that point, marks the border between the counties of Durham and North Yorkshire. The crossing at the River Tees at Neasham is the point of the great road north and the point where the bishops crossed into Co Durham (the Land of the Prince Bishops). The layout of Neasham consists of one main street, Teesway, which runs west to east for about half a mile plus some minor turn-offs with residences.

In the summer visitors come to the village for canoeing, fishing, cycling and horseriding.

== Events ==
Bonfire night- on the playing field next to the river the village holds a huge bonfire with local people starting to collect branches, furniture etc. in early September. In 2006 Stockton Borough Council tried to stop the bonfire because of health and safety but failed. Afterwards there is also fireworks. This has now been stopped due to the high cost of insurance. The last display and bonfire was in 2009.

Ducky Derby- People buy plastic ducks and then they are all released into the river and the first one to the finishing line wins a prize.

== See also ==
- HMS Neasham, a Ham class minesweeper
