= River Tees =

East coast river of Northern England

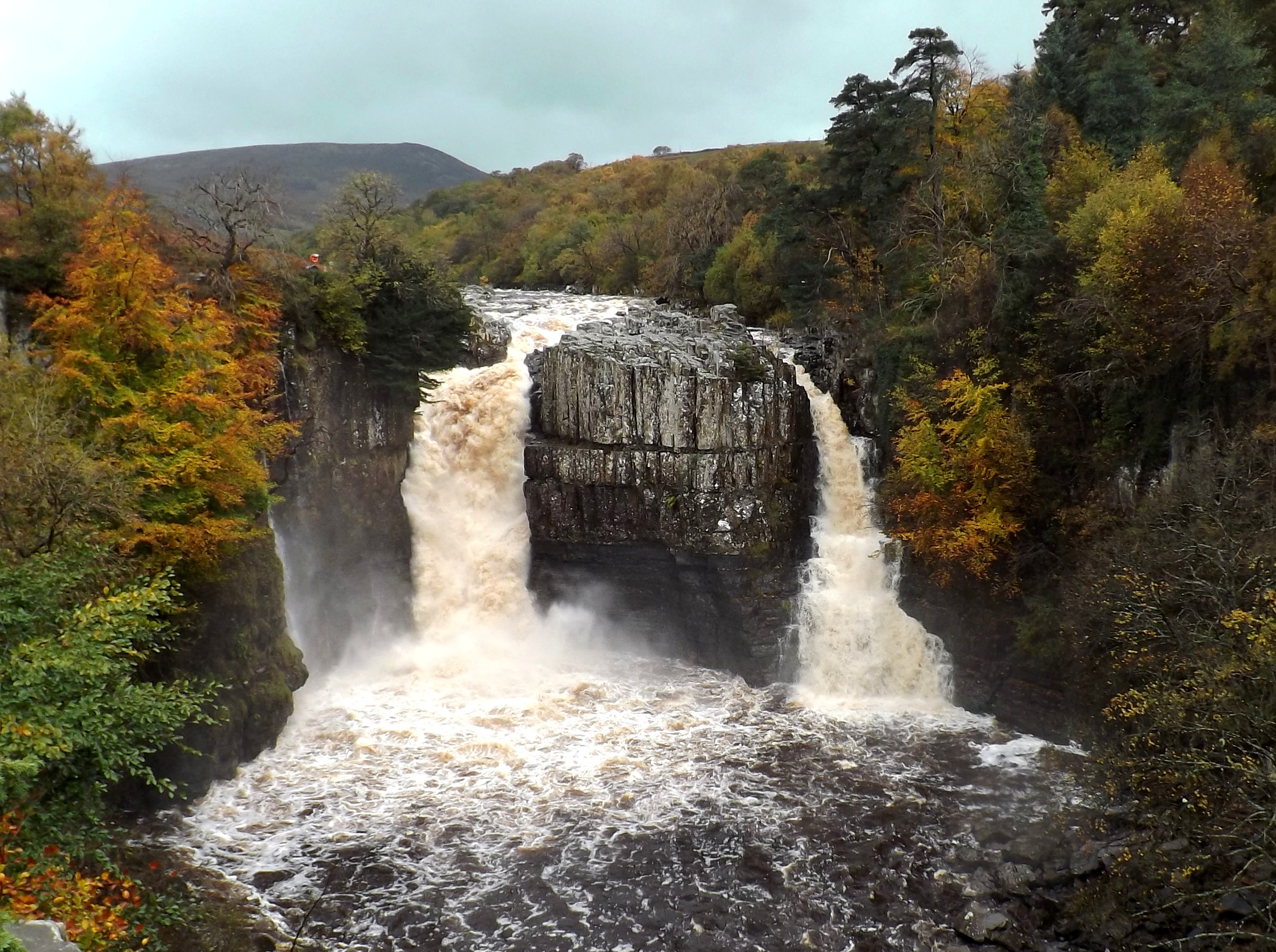
- High Force on the River Tees

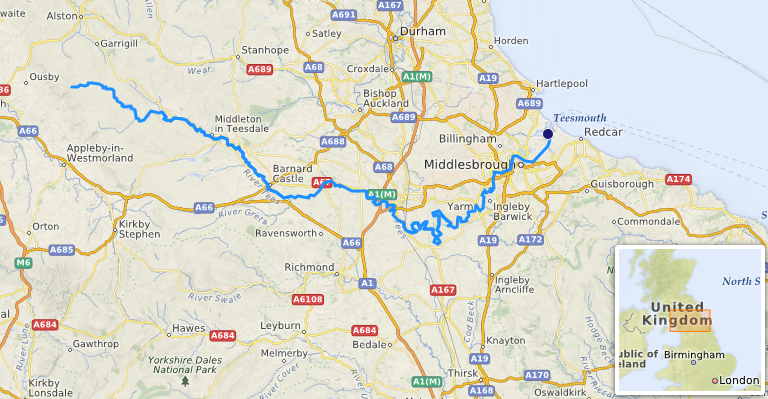
- Course of the Tees

Location
- Country: England
- County: County Durham; North Yorkshire; Yorkshire (historical); Cumbria; Cumberland (historical); Westmorland (historical)

Physical characteristics
- Source
  - location: Cross Fell
  - coordinates: 54.7006°N 2.4673°W
  - elevation: 2,474 ft (754 m)
- Mouth: North Sea
  - location: between Seal Sands and Redcar
  - coordinates: 54.6483°N 1.1474°W
  - elevation: 0 ft (0 m)
- Length: 85 mi (137 km)
- Basin size: 708 sq mi (1,834 km^{2})

Basin features
- Tributaries
  - left: Harwood Beck, Hudeshope Beck, Eggleston Burn, Skerne, Billingham Beck
  - right: Maize Beck, Lune, Balder, Greta, Leven

The River Tees (/tiːz/), in England, rises on the eastern slope of Cross Fell in the North Pennines and flows eastwards for 85 miles (137 km) to reach the North Sea in the North East of England. The modern-day history of the river has been tied with the industries on Teesside in its lower reaches, where it has provided the means of import and export of goods to and from the North East England. The need for water further downstream also meant that reservoirs were built in the extreme upper reaches, such as Cow Green.

== Etymology ==
The name Tees is possibly of Brittonic origin. The element *tēs, meaning "warmth" with connotations of "boiling, excitement" (Welsh tes), may underlie the name. (Note: Brittonic Language (Alan James) < *tēs > . . . ‘Warmth’, with connotations of ‘boiling’, ‘excitement’, etc. . . . Proposed by Ekwall, ERN pp. 395-7, for the river-name Tees, but note Jackson’s scepticism . . .) *Teihx-s, a root possibly derived from Brittonic *ti (Welsh tail, "dung, manure"), has also been used to explain the name Tees (compare River Tyne). (Note: Brittonic Language (Alan James) < *ti- > . . . a pre-Celtic root *tei-/*ti- for river names of the ‘Tyne’ type, following Ekwall in giving the meaning as ‘to melt, to flow’. . . . However, the existence of such a root is questionable . . .)

== Geography ==
The river drains 710 square miles (1,800 km^{2}) and has a number of tributaries including the River Greta, River Lune, River Balder, River Leven and River Skerne. Before the reorganisation of the historic English counties, the river formed the boundary between County Durham and Yorkshire. In its lower reaches it now forms the boundary between the ceremonial counties of County Durham and North Yorkshire, while in the highest part of its course it forms the boundary between the historic counties of Westmorland and Durham. The head of Teesdale (the name of valley especially at this end), has a desolate grandeur, surrounded by moorland and hills, some exceeding 2,500 feet (760 m). This area is part of the North Pennine Area of Outstanding Natural Beauty.

The source of the river at Teeshead just below Cross Fell is at an elevation of about 2,401 feet (732 m). It flows east-north-east through an area of shake holes through carboniferous limestone. Below Viewing Hill, it turns south to the Cow Green Reservoir constructed to store water to be released in dry conditions to satisfy the industrial need for water on Teesside.

Emerging from the reservoir at Cauldron Snout the river traverses a series of hard black basalt and dolerite rocks that intrude through the softer limestone, in a succession of falls or rapids. From this point downstream the Tees forms the boundary between the traditional counties of Durham and Yorkshire almost without a break, although since 1974 much of it is wholly in Durham. The dale widens below Cauldron Snout, and trees appear, contrasting with the broken rocks where the water descends over High Force. After a short turn northwards, the river continues to meander south-easterly. Close to where the B6277 road begins to run parallel to the river is the 69-foot (21 m) High Force waterfall. About 1 1/2 miles (2.4 km) downstream is the smaller Low Force waterfall.

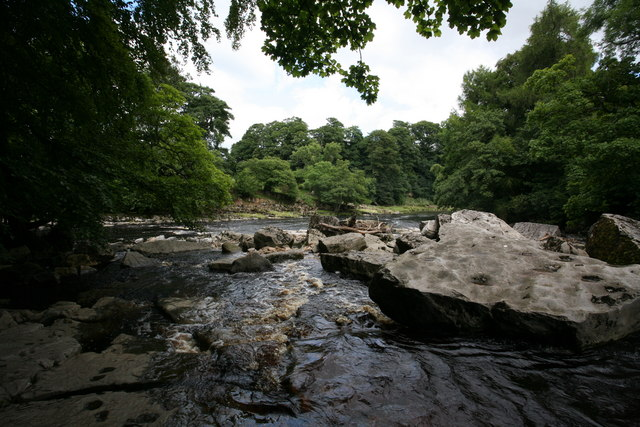
The confluence of the River Greta and the River Tees

The scenery becomes gentler and more picturesque as the river descends past Middleton-in-Teesdale (Durham). This locality has lead and ironstone resources. Just to the east of Middleton-in-Teesdale, the River Lune joins the Tees. After passing the village of Romaldkirk to the west, the river is joined by the River Balder at Cotherstone. The ancient town of Barnard Castle, Egglestone Abbey, and Rokeby Park, known through Sir Walter Scott's poem Rokeby, are all passed. At Rokeby the Tees is joined by the River Greta. From the area near Eggleston, the river is crossing over millstone grit. From here the valley begins to open out, and traverses the rich plain east and south of Darlington in large meandering curves.

The course of the valley down to here has been generally east-south-east, but it now turns north-east near the village of Whorlton. Passing Ovington and Winston it runs parallel to the A67 south-east past Gainford and Piercebridge to Darlington, passing under the A1 and A66. The section from Piercebridge to Hurworth flows over magnesian limestone. It is at Croft-on-Tees that the River Skerne joins the Tees. The river now flows south past Croft-on-Tees before swinging northwards past Hurworth-on-Tees. A series of large meanders takes the course past Neasham, Low Dinsdale and Sockburn to Middleton St George. In the lower reaches of the river valley the water flows over bunter sandstone and pebble beds.

Just past Yarm, the River Leven joins the Tees, before passing the settlements of Eaglescliffe, Ingleby Barwick and Thornaby-on-Tees. Now nearing the sea, the Tees becomes an important commercial waterway, with the ports of Stockton-on-Tees and Middlesbrough on its banks. It passes through the Tees Barrage between these ports, turning tidal downstream from the barrage.

Teesport is built on reclaimed land on the south side of the Tees estuary below Middlesbrough. A direct line from the source of the Tees to Teesmouth is 50 miles (80 km), but due to the meandering of the river, it flows for over 80 miles (130 km).

== Water levels ==
Monitoring station	Station elevation	Low water level	High water level	Record high level
Middleton-on-Tees	216 m (709 ft)	0.37 m (1.2 ft)	1.5 m (4.9 ft)	3.19 m (10.5 ft)
Barnard Castle (Startforth)	141 m (463 ft)	0.46 m (1.5 ft)	1.4 m (4.6 ft)	2.68 m (8.8 ft)
Broken Scar (Darlington)	41 m (135 ft)	0.54 m (1.8 ft)	1.7 m (5.6 ft)	3.28 m (10.8 ft)
Low Moor (Low Dinsdale)	18 m (59 ft)	0.31 m (1.0 ft)	4 m (13 ft)	6.32 m (20.7 ft)
Yarm	7 m (23 ft)	0.45 m (1.5 ft)	2.05 m (6.7 ft)	4.08 m (13.4 ft)

- Low and high water levels are an average figure.

== Seal Sands ==
Before the heavy industrialisation of the Tees, the flats at Seal Sands in the estuary were home to common seals. For around 100 years this species was absent from the estuary but have now returned and can be seen on the flats at Seal Sands. The Seal Sands area is now designated as the Teesmouth National Nature Reserve.

== Alterations ==
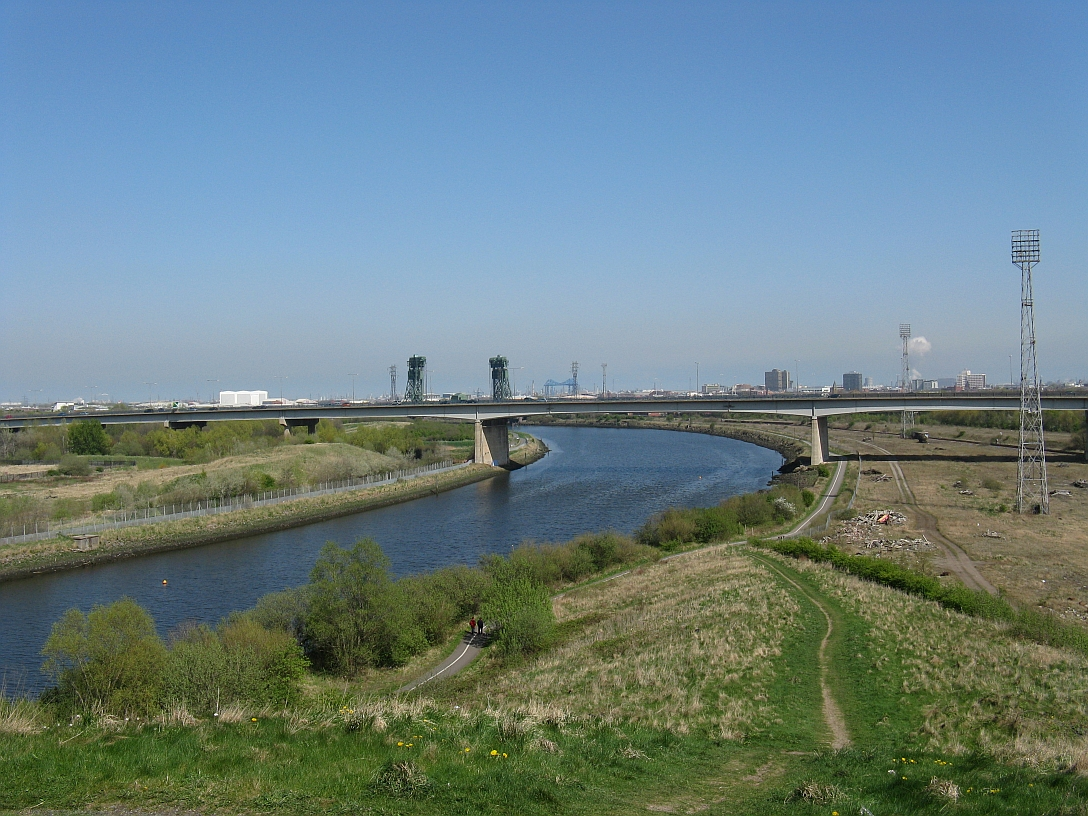
The River Tees (Portrack Cut) passing through the Green-Blue Heart of the Tees Corridor between Middlesbrough and Stockton District.

A proposal was made in 1769 to make cuts in the river which would straighten the course and enable ships to save time and money in navigation. Between Stockton-on-Tees and Middlesbrough, the river previously meandered first south and then north of its current channel. Two "cuts", known as the Mandale Cut and the Portrack Cut, were made to straighten its course in 1810 and 1831 respectively. Before these cuts were made, the journey by sailing barge from Thornaby to the mouth of the Tees, allowing for tides and other factors, could take as long as seven days. The Mandale Cut was the shorter of the two, at about 220 yards (200 m), with the Portrack Cut being considerably longer (1,100 yards (1,000 m)), although the northern meander it removed was smaller than the southern meander. Neither meander is visible today, except for the flow of Stainsby Beck into a waterway which is marked on maps first as "The Fleet" and then "Old River Tees". The current Tees Barrage is close to the site of the Mandale Cut.

Since the cuts were made, the river has continued to undergo alterations to its bed and banks to make it deeper and more navigable. The channel has been made considerably narrower by dumping ship's ballast and ironworks slag along the former banks, increasing the scouring due to its natural flow. Maps made prior to 1900 show that between Stockton and Middlesbrough the river flowed in a channel up to 330 yards (300 m) wide in places, with many shoals and sandbars. The modern channel varies between about 110 yards (100 m) and 220 yards (200 m).

In October 2021 the UK engineering company, GRAHAM, started work on the 0.75-mile (1.2 km) South Bank Quay project to provide a deep water facility. It is expected that two million tonnes of material will be dredged to allow GE Renewable Energy to load huge wind turbine blades onto ships. The 351-foot (107 m) long blades are destined for the Dogger Bank wind farm. The Heavy Fuel Oil Farm and Tarmac jetties are to be removed.

== Industry ==
The River Tees has been used for transporting industrial goods since the Industrial Revolution, particularly for the shipment of coal from the Durham Coalfields and also for the steel industries that later developed around Middlesbrough. In the early years merchant ships left the River Tees after loading in Yarm and Stockton on Tees; but as merchant ships became bigger, these smaller docks were superseded by bigger and deeper docks in Middlesbrough, and later even further downstream at Teesport close to the mouth of the River Tees. The emergence of the Steel industry in the late 19th century earned it the nickname "The Steel River" owing to the many steelworks that operated along the banks of the Tees. In the 20th century the river also became important to the developing chemical industry, contributing particularly to the development of Imperial Chemical Industries (ICI) who used reclaimed land on the north bank for import/export facilities.

The move to loading coal on bigger ships in Middlesbrough was the economic driver for the development not only of the town of Middlesbrough itself but also of the railway between Stockton and Darlington. This is where George Stephenson developed his railway engine "Locomotion" and this railway was the first steam railway to carry passengers, as well as industrial materials. The Stockton and Darlington Railway was founded after an initial shareholders' meeting in a room in a public house in Yarm.

Today Teesport is owned by PD Ports; it is located close to the North Sea and 3 miles (5 km) east of Middlesbrough. Teesport is currently the third largest port in the United Kingdom, and among the ten biggest in Western Europe, handling over 56 million tonnes of domestic and international cargo per year. The vast majority of these products are still related to the steel and chemical industries made by companies that are members of the Northeast of England Process Industry Cluster (NEPIC). The areas where large scale commodity chemical industry continues to be based are Billingham and Seal Sands, both on the north bank of the River Tees, and Wilton on the south bank. The Teesside Steelworks at Redcar operated until closure in 2015.

Other industrial companies that use the River Tees are manufacturing and servicing the North Sea oil and gas industry as well as the renewable energy industry sector, including offshore wind turbines. The south bank of the mouth of the River Tees has the 62-megawatt Teesside Offshore Wind Farm, built 2011–13.

Near the mouth of the River Tees is the large dry dock facility of ABLE UK, named TERRC (Teesside Environmental Reclamation and Recycling Centre), used to dismantle or oil rigs and other large vessels. Hartlepool Nuclear Power Station is adjacent to the east.

== 2021 North-East England shellfish die-off ==
In early October 2021 thousands of dead crabs and lobsters were washed up on the Tees estuary and beaches along the North-East coast of England. The deaths were first reported in Seaton Carew, Redcar and Seaham. A 95% decline in the lobster and crab catch was noticed by those employed in the local fishing industry. A spokesperson for the UK Environment Agency said, "Samples of water, sediment, mussel and crab have been collected and are being sent to our labs for analysis to consider whether a pollution incident could have contributed to the deaths of the animals." The Centre for Environment, Fisheries and Aquaculture Science (Cefas) labs were also testing crustaceans for disease. There is no evidence of any link to recent strandings of marine mammals and seabirds across the UK and countries along the North Sea coast, according to the EA.

By late November the crustacean die-off had spread as far south as Robin Hood's Bay and was affecting catches in Whitby. The Environment Agency has ruled out chemical pollution as the cause of the mass shellfish deaths. Dredging was also rejected as the cause of the environmental disaster. Environment Agency operations manager Sarah Jennings said, "We've used both traditional and innovative screening methods to analyse samples of water, sediment and crab looking for traces of contamination. We’ve screened for over 1,000 potential chemical contaminants but found no anomalies that could lead to an event of this scale."

In early February 2022 it was reported that, "Defra and partner agencies have completed a thorough investigation of the cause of dead crabs and lobsters which were found washed up on the North East coast between October and December 2021. Following significant testing and modelling to rule out possible causes, Defra and partner agencies consider that the deaths of the crabs and lobsters potentially resulted from a naturally occurring harmful algal bloom." In June 2022 George Monbiot wrote in The Guardian, "Astonishingly, although there is no evidence that it conducted such sampling, the government concluded not only that a bloom had occurred, but that it was caused by a particular, toxic species: Karenia mikimotoi. This is the stuff of science fiction. Karenia thrives in temperatures between 20 and 24 °C [68 and 75 °F]. The average water temperature on this coast in October is 13 °C [55 °F]. There is no plausible mechanism by which a Karenia bloom could cause the mass death of lobsters and crabs without also killing large numbers of fish, sea urchins and many other species." Monbiot reported that when he asked the UK government to publish its evidence the government refused.

== Legends and folklore ==
Peg Powler is a hag in English folklore who is said to inhabit the River Tees.

== In popular culture ==
The River Tees was featured in the television series Seven Natural Wonders as one of the wonders of the North, and in the post-apocalyptic drama The Last Train having blown its banks.

== Crossings ==
An early crossing of the Tees was made by the Romans, with the construction of a bridge at Piercebridge, along with a corresponding fortress. The bridge was built on the route of Dere Street, and as a result it likely saw a great deal of military traffic going between the fortress at York and the northern frontier. It was first built in wood around 90 AD, before being rebuilt in stone, possibly when the first bridge washed away. The use of the bridge may have continued into the sub-Roman period.

Crossings of the Tees continued to be important in the journey from north to south, and vice versa, along the east coast, during the medieval period. During the 13th century it was described as "the major obstacle to speedy travel out of the diocese of Durham southwards", with the contemporary fords, bridges and ferries proving particularly inconvenient in the winter period. This included the Great North Road, for which the Croft Bridge was built in the 13th or 14th centuries. Yarm Bridge was built around 1400, by bishop Skirlaw.

In 1771 a major flood on the Tees, along with others in the North-East, caused major damage to the river's bridges, completely destroying some. The Wynch Bridge, supposedly the oldest suspension bridge in Europe, dating from 1741, was lifted from its moorings. The bridge in Gilmonby was recorded as being destroyed after having only been fully operational for 3 years. On the other hand, The medieval Yarm Bridge was not affected by the flood, despite every other building in the town being damaged.

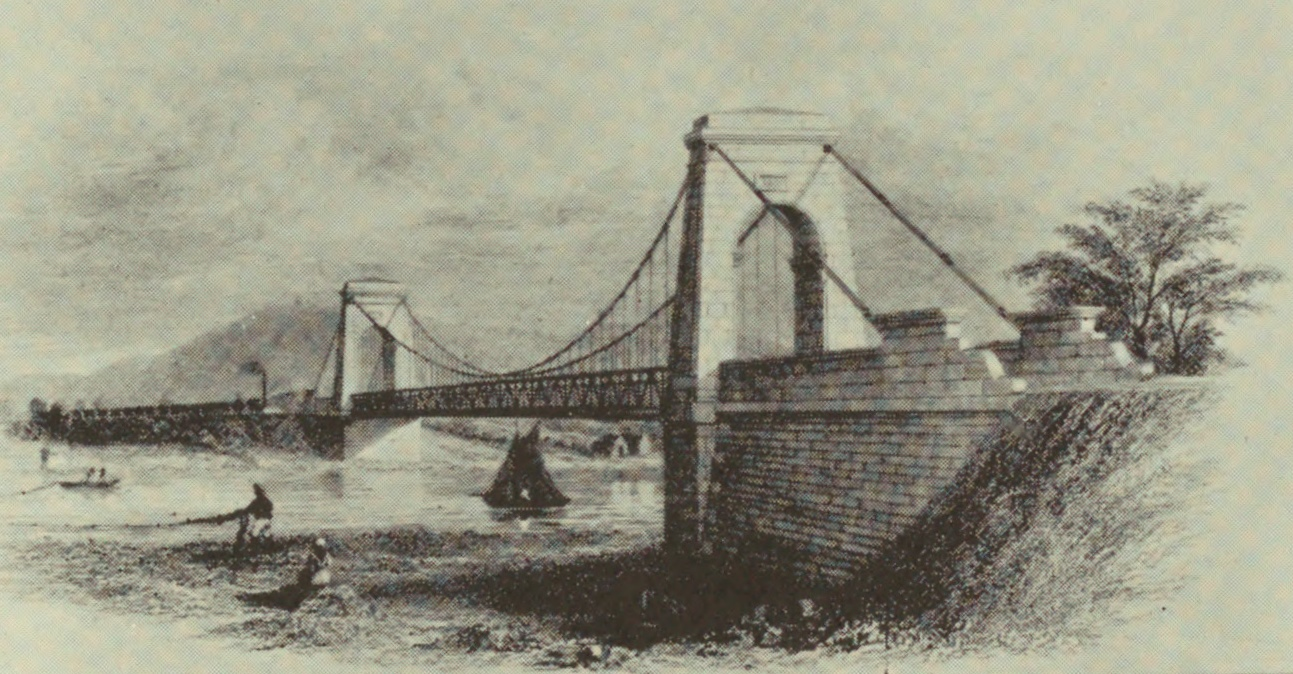
1830 illustration of the Stockton Railway Suspension Bridge, the first railway suspension bridge in the world, on the site of today's Surtees Rail Bridge.

With the industrialisation of the area through the 19th century, many new bridges where needed closer to the ports mouth. When the Stockton and Darlington railway, first opened in 1825, it was realised that the staiths at Stockton were too small to export the desired amount of coal. The decision was made to start exporting closer to the rivers mouth on the other bank, at Port Darlington (later Middlesbrough). This required the building of the first suspension railway bridge. (Note: Due to design flaws, this first bridge swayed far to much and had to be supported by wooden "Starlings". Even still the sway was so much that wagons had chained 9 meters apart so that weight was distributed evenly across the bridge.) This moved the commercial centre of gravity of Teesside further down stream, where many future bridges would be built.

By the end of that century there were 21 principal firms on and adjacent to the Tees in the Stockton and Thornaby area, with 36 firms in the Middlesbrough area. This led to the development of two of the most famous bridges on the river, The Transporter Bridge, in 1911, and the Newport Bridge, in 1934, both trying to balance the needs of travellers across the river with shipping up and down it.

=== Gallery ===
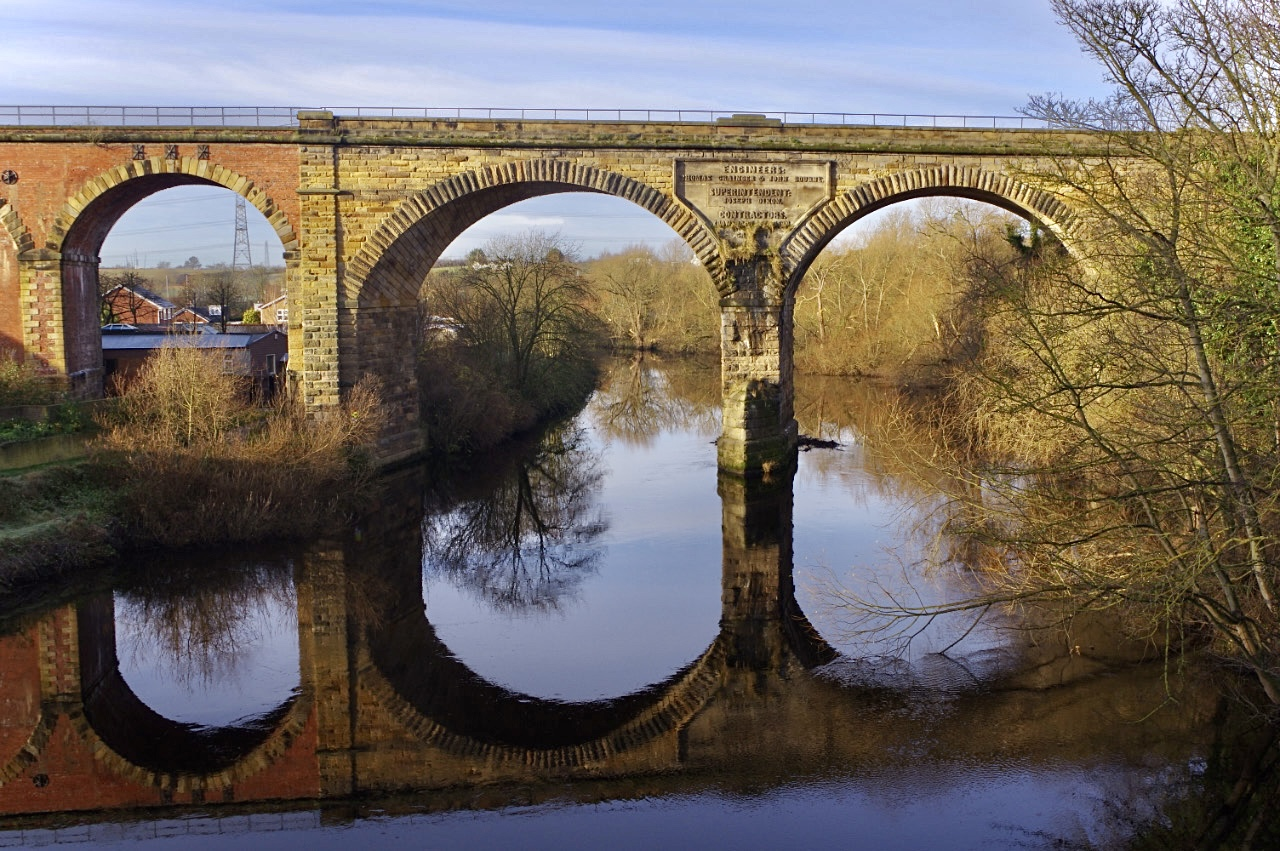
Yarm Viaduct

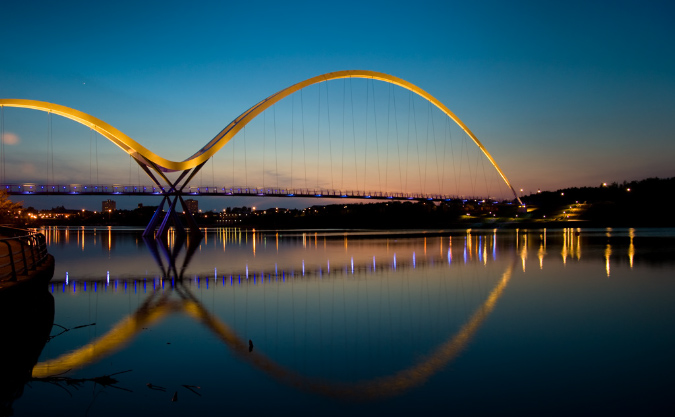
Infinity Bridge

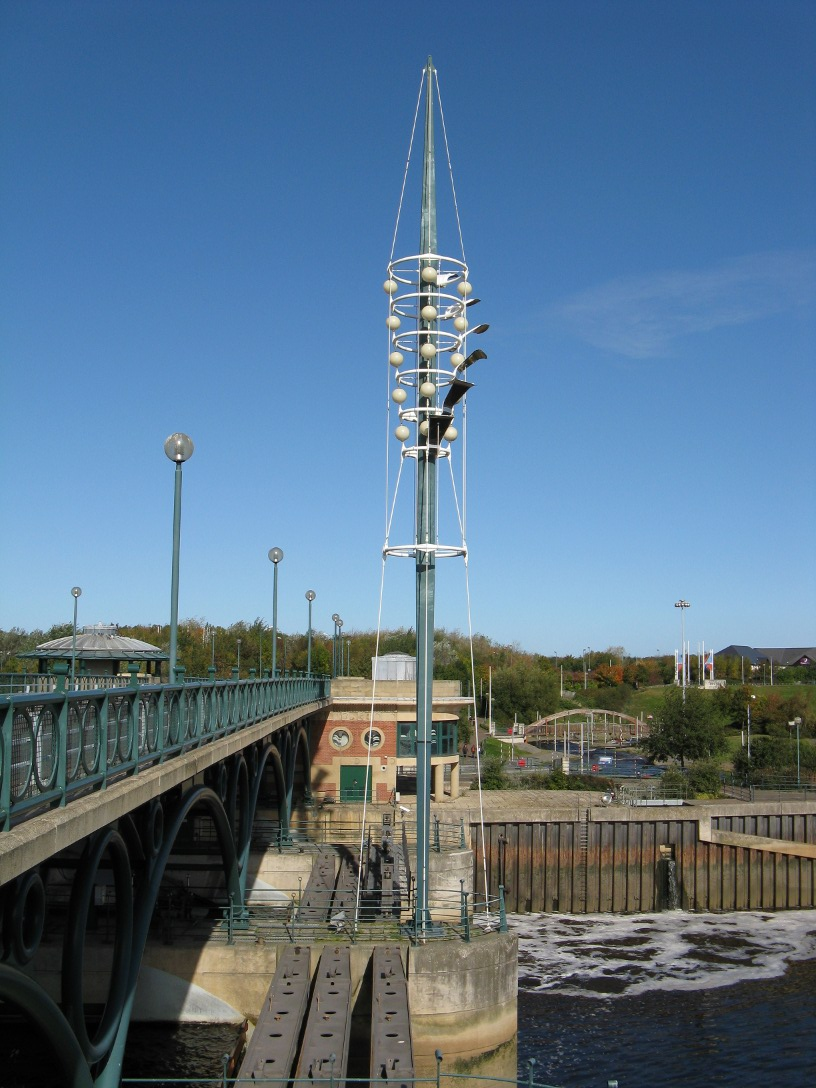
Tees Barrage with White Water course in background

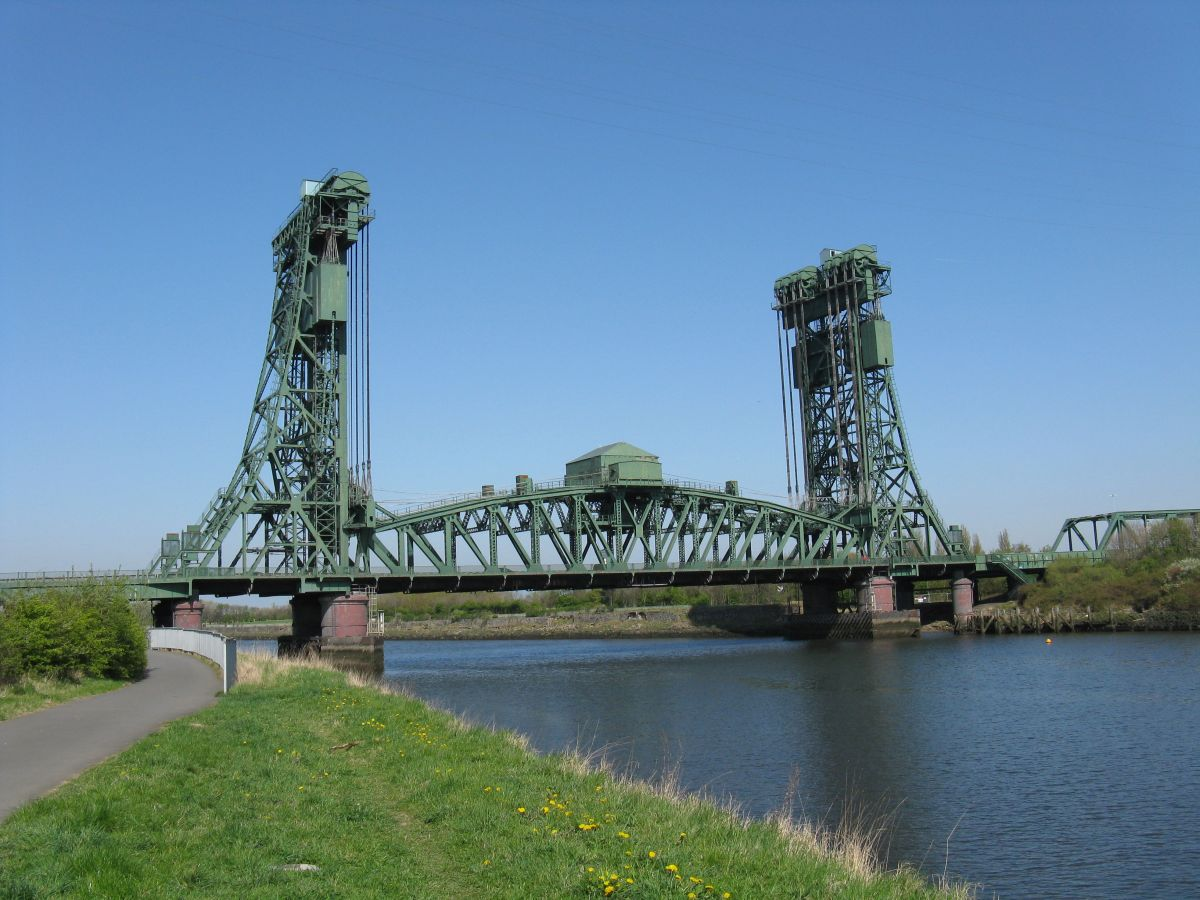
Tees Newport Bridge

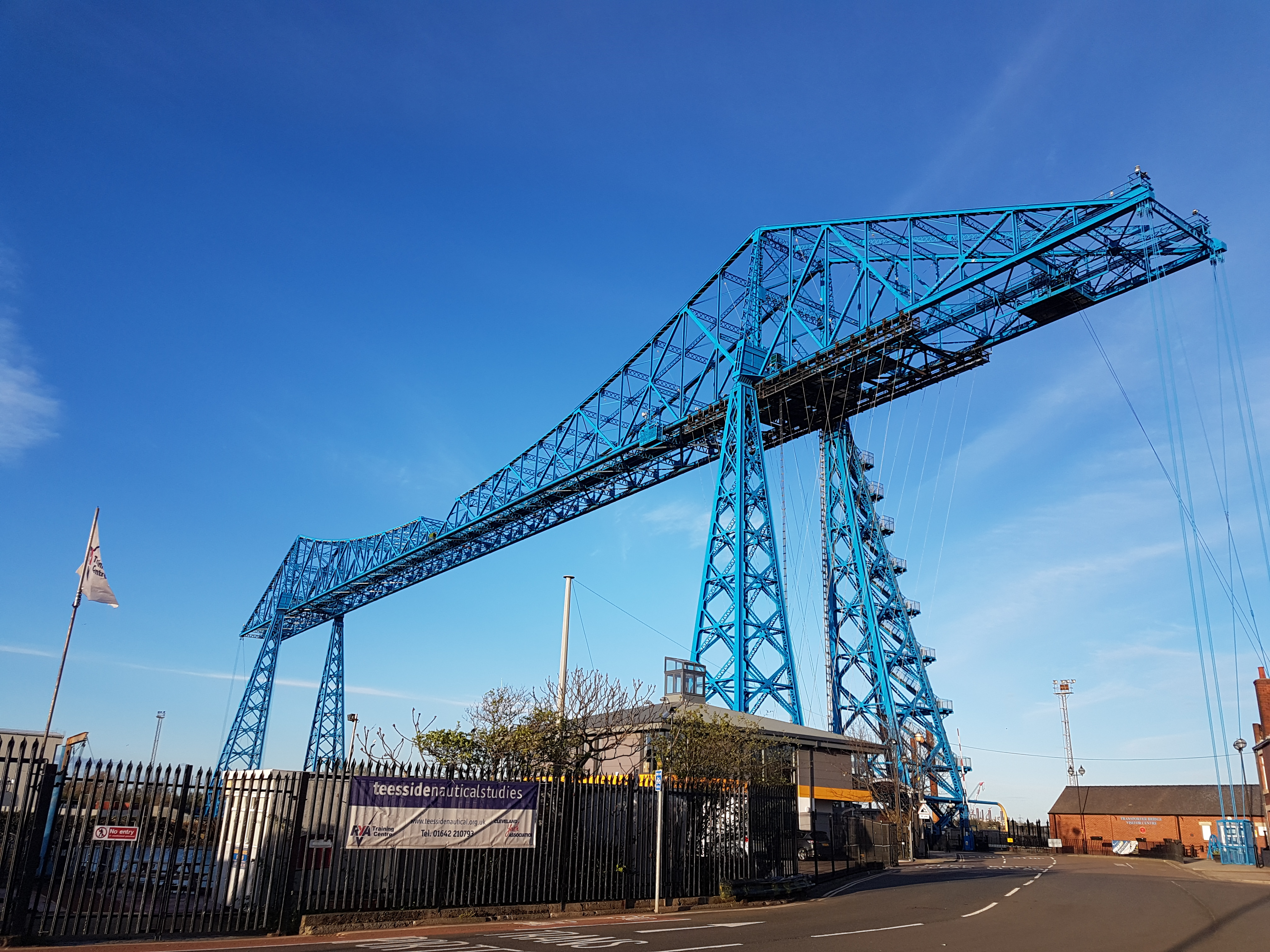
Tees Transporter Bridge

== See also ==
- List of crossings of the River Tees
- List of settlements on the River Tees
- List of tributaries of the River Tees
- Northeast of England Process Industry Cluster
- Rivers of the United Kingdom
- Stockton & Darlington Railway
- Teesside Conurbation
- Teesdale, the valley
- Tees Valley City Region
- Teesdale Way

== Sources ==
- Industrial rivers of the United Kingdom. London: T F Unwin. 1888. OCLC 1167792689.
- James, Alan G. (2019). "The Brittonic Language in the Old North, A Guide to the Place-Name Evidence, Volume 2" (PDF). SPNS – The Brittonic Language in the Old North. Scottish Place-Name Society.
