= John Richardson (poet) =

- Born: 20 August 1817; Naddle Vale, England
- Died: 30 April 1886 (aged 68); England
- Occupation: Poet
- Spouse: Grace Birkett
- Children: 10
- Writing career
- Language: English
- Genre: Poetry

John Richardson (20 August 1817 – 30 April 1886) was an English poet. Living near Keswick all his life, he contributed to local cultural life, and published poetry, some in the local dialect.

== Life ==
He was born at Stone House in Naddle Vale, near Keswick, Cumberland, in 1817, one of seven children of Daniel Richardson and his wife Mary née Faulder, who were natives of the Vale. He was educated under the Reverend Edward Wilson, who taught the school of St John's in the Vale and was incumbent of its little church.

On leaving school Richardson followed his father's trade as a mason, and eventually as a builder. He rebuilt the church of St John's in the Vale, the parsonage, and the schoolhouse. About 1857 he became master of the school, where he taught until partially disabled by a paralytic seizure about a year before his death. He died on the fell side, near his residence, Bridge House, on 30 April 1886, and was buried at the church of St John's in the Vale on 4 May.

Aged 24 he married Grace Birkett, who, with eight of their family of ten children, survived him.

== Writings ==
Many of his writings, which are numerous, both in prose and verse, are in the vernacular of the district of Cumberland in which he had spent his life.

He published Cummerland Talk: Being Short Tales And Rhymes In The Dialect of That County, Together With A Few Miscellaneous Pieces In Verse (volume 1 1871, volume 2 1876).

Richardson read seven papers to the Keswick Literary Society, which were printed in the Transactions of the Cumberland Association for the Advancement of Literature and Science. In 1879 and 1880 he contributed to the West Cumberland Times a series of sketches, "Stwories 'at Granny used to tell".

He also contributed to various newspapers pieces of poetry and prose, some of them in the Cumberland dialect. Most of his compositions are characterised by humour and pathos. As a poet and songwriter he had a great local reputation, and his literary work often proved of conspicuous merit.
