= High Rigg =

Mountain in England

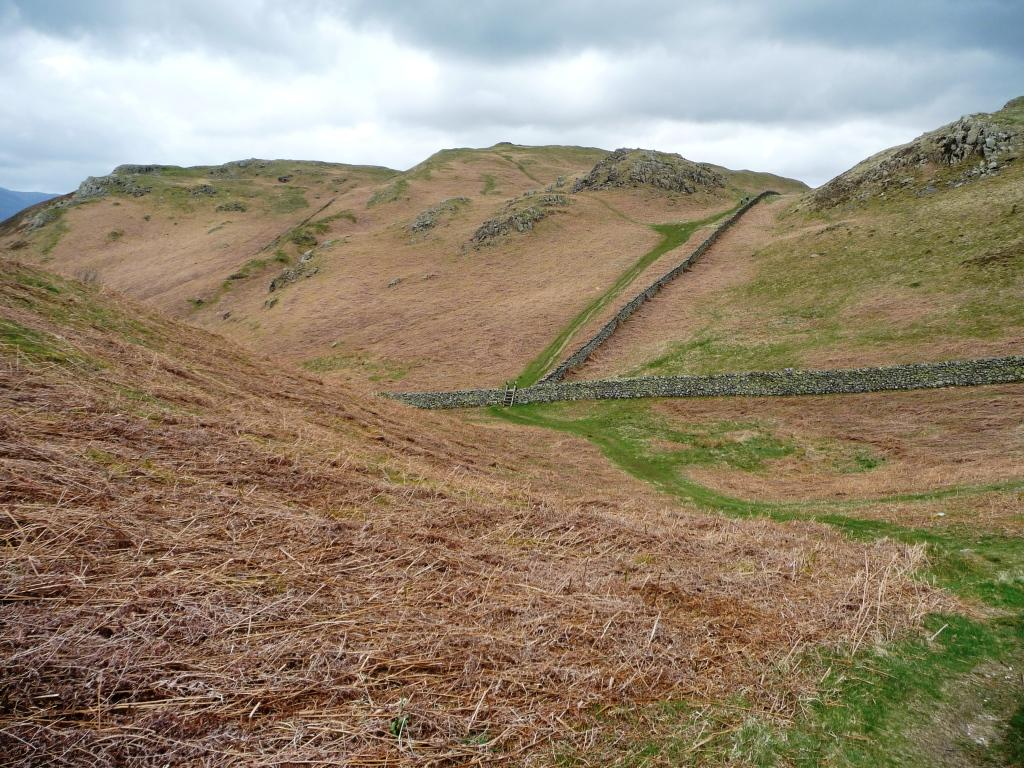

Highest point
- Elevation: 357 m (1,171 ft)
- Prominence: c. 189 m
- Parent peak: High Raise
- Listing: Marilyn, Wainwright
- Coordinates: 54°35′18″N 3°04′20″W

Geography
- Location within the Lake District
- Location: Cumbria, England
- Parent range: Lake District, Central Fells
- OS grid: NY308220
- Topo map: OS Explorer OL5

High Rigg is a small fell located in the English Lake District, approximately three miles southeast of the town of Keswick. It occupies an unusual position, surrounded on all sides by higher fells but not connected by any obvious ridge. This separation from its fellows ensures that it is a Marilyn (a hill with topographic prominence of at least 150m).

== Name ==
The word Rigg is from the Old English language and means a bumpy fell or ridge.

== Topography ==
High Rigg is strictly the continuation of the ridge running up the western shore of Thirlmere, whose high point is Raven Crag. This forms the watershed between the Shoulthwaite and Thirlmere/ Vale of St John systems. The depression between High Rigg and Raven Crag to the south — at only around 550 ft (170 m) — is at Smaithwaite, just south of the A591 Keswick to Ambleside road.

High Rigg resembles a model of the Lakeland Fells in miniature, complete with crags, intermediate tops, tarns and even a 'pass' crossing the ridge halfway along, complete with church. The northern and southern aspects of the fell are largely grassed and gently rolling, in contrast to the western and eastern flanks which are steep with numerous rocky outcroppings and cliffs.

Travelling south to north the main features are Wren Crag (1,020 ft), overlooking the Vale of St John, Yew Crag (1,000 ft) facing west and then two tops at 1,125 ft (343 m) and 1,171 ft (357 m) respectively. The ridge then falls to the 'pass' and St. John's church, before rising again to Low Rigg (836 ft). Finally, comes Tewet Tarn as the ridge falls away to the river Greta. Also known as Tewfit Tarn, this shallow pool stands on a shelf, overlooked by higher rocks.

== Geology ==
The geology of the ridge is complex with much small scale faulting. Gravel and scree overlay much of the fell which lies between two branches of the Coniston Fault, with the plagioclase-phyric andesite lavas of the Birker Fell Formation beneath. Low Rigg exhibits intrusions of microgranite to the surface.

== Summit ==
The summit has a cairn set on an outcrop and commands a fine view of the surrounding fells. The giants of Skiddaw and Blencathra dominate the view to the north, and Clough Head and the Helvellyn range the view east. Thirlmere is visible to the south and Bleaberry Fell to the west, over which the Scafell group can be seen on a clear day.

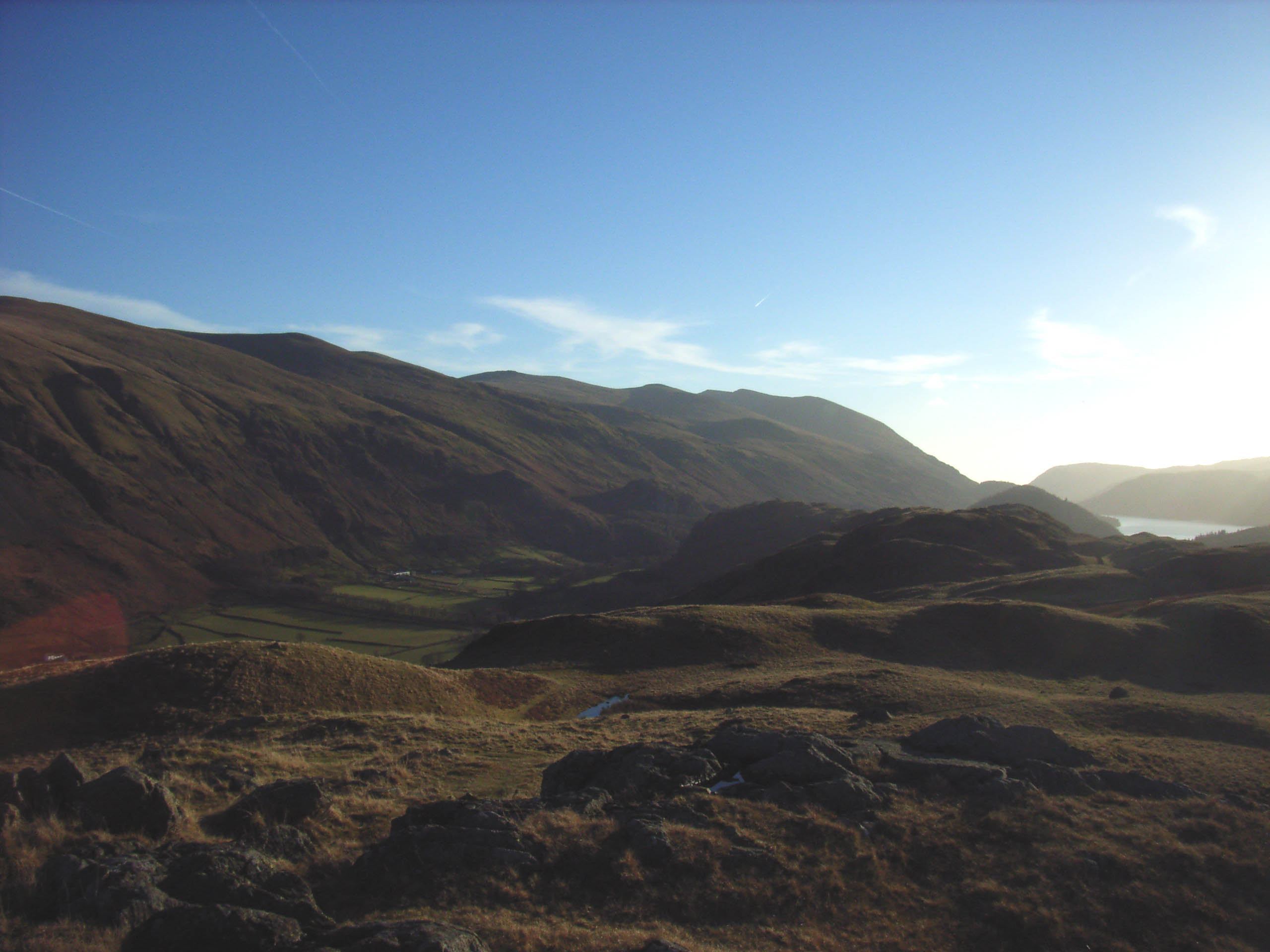
The Helvellyn range, seen from the summit of High Rigg.

== Ascents ==
The hill may be climbed in a short twenty-minute walk from the Church of St John's in the Vale. It only involves about 120 m (400 ft) of climb and is one of the shortest ascents in the Lakes. Alternatively, a traverse of the fell's three-mile (5 km) long ridge may be made, starting at Tewit Tarn and finishing near Shoulthwaite.
