= A594 =

A594 road may refer to:

- A594 road (Leicester), Leicester's inner ring road
- A594 road (Cumbria), leads from Maryport to Cockermouth
