= Ade Adesina =

Nigerian artist

- Born: 1980 (age 45–46); Nigeria
- Education: Gray's School of Art, Aberdeen
- Known for: Printmaking, linocuts, woodcuts, etchings
- Notable work: Large-scale printmaking works addressing environmental themes
- Style: Ecologically themed, surreal, narrative-driven
- Awards: Royal Scottish Academician, Member of the Royal Glasgow Institute of the Arts

Ade Adesina was born in Nigeria in 1980 and studied Fine Art at Gray's School of Art, Aberdeen and continues to live and work in the city. He is known for his ecologically themed linocuts, woodcuts and etchings. Some of these are on a scale which pushes the limits of print making techniques.

Adesina's work combines global images: from his African heritage, travel experiences, architecture and the natural world, to create imagined scenarios. They are stories which pose questions about the human footprint on our planet and are a call to think about the way we live.

"I work in a very strange way. Every print, sculpture or painting owns a story; it is like reading a novel. There are different characters coming in at different chapters. I don’t find it interesting knowing where a piece of work is going to end before I begin. I can start on the earth and end on the moon. What I enjoy most includes not knowing what direction a piece of work is going." – Ade Adesina

Adesina has made collaborative work with many notable artists – Ian Burke, June Carey, Lennox Dunbar, David Mach, June Carey, Barry McGlashan, Florence Poirier Nkpa and Thomasz Wrobel.

Adesina has held artist residencies at Eton College, Highland Print Studio, Glasgow Print Studio, and Grays School of Art. He is a Royal Scottish Academician and member of the Royal Glasgow Institute of the Arts.
