= St John's in the Vale =

Valley in Cumbria, England

Coordinates: 54.593°N 3.060°W

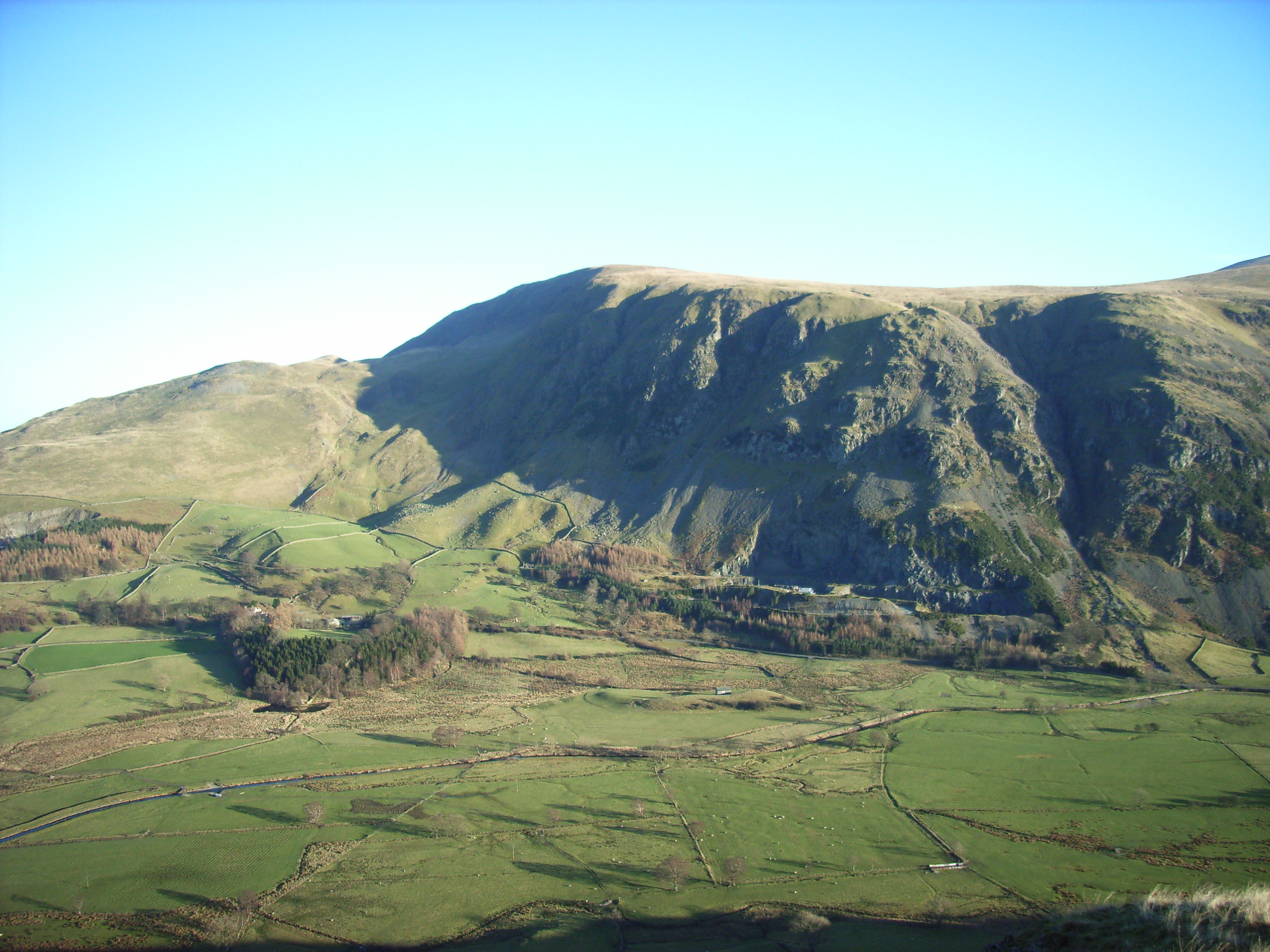
St John’s in the Vale and Clough Head looking east from the summit of High Rigg

St John’s in the Vale is a glacial valley in the Lake District National Park, Cumbria, England. Within the vale are a number of farms and small settlements, in addition to several disused quarry and mining works. St John’s Beck meanders northward along the floor of the vale, and is the main outflow from Thirlmere reservoir, which is located to the south. Alongside the beck runs the B5322, St John’s in the Vale Road.

The vale is in the heart of the northern Lake District and is surrounded by many of the most striking of the Lakeland fells. It runs from south to north, set between the rocky flanks of Clough Head to the east and the neighbours High Rigg and Low Rigg to the west. The southern end of the vale is a narrow pass between High Rigg and Great Dodd, just to the north of the small settlement of Legburthwaite. At its northern end the vale widens to meet the broad east-to-west valley of the River Greta near Threlkeld. The view north from the vale is dominated by the mountains Blencathra and Skiddaw.

High on the western side of the vale lies St John’s in the Vale Church, located in a low pass between High Rigg on the southern side and Low Rigg to the north. This pass provides access for suitably capable vehicles between the vale and Dale Bottom in the Naddle Valley to the west of High Rigg. The present building dates from 1845, with the earliest reference to a church at the site being 1554. On the opposite side of the vale, cut into the northern flank of Clough Head, lies the Threlkeld Quarry and Mining Museum. This former commercial quarry, first opened in the late nineteenth century, was established as a museum in 1992.

The picturesque writer William Gilpin describes a landslide that happened here on 22 August 1749 as being caused by ‘one of those terrible inundations, which wasted lately the vale of Brackenwait’.

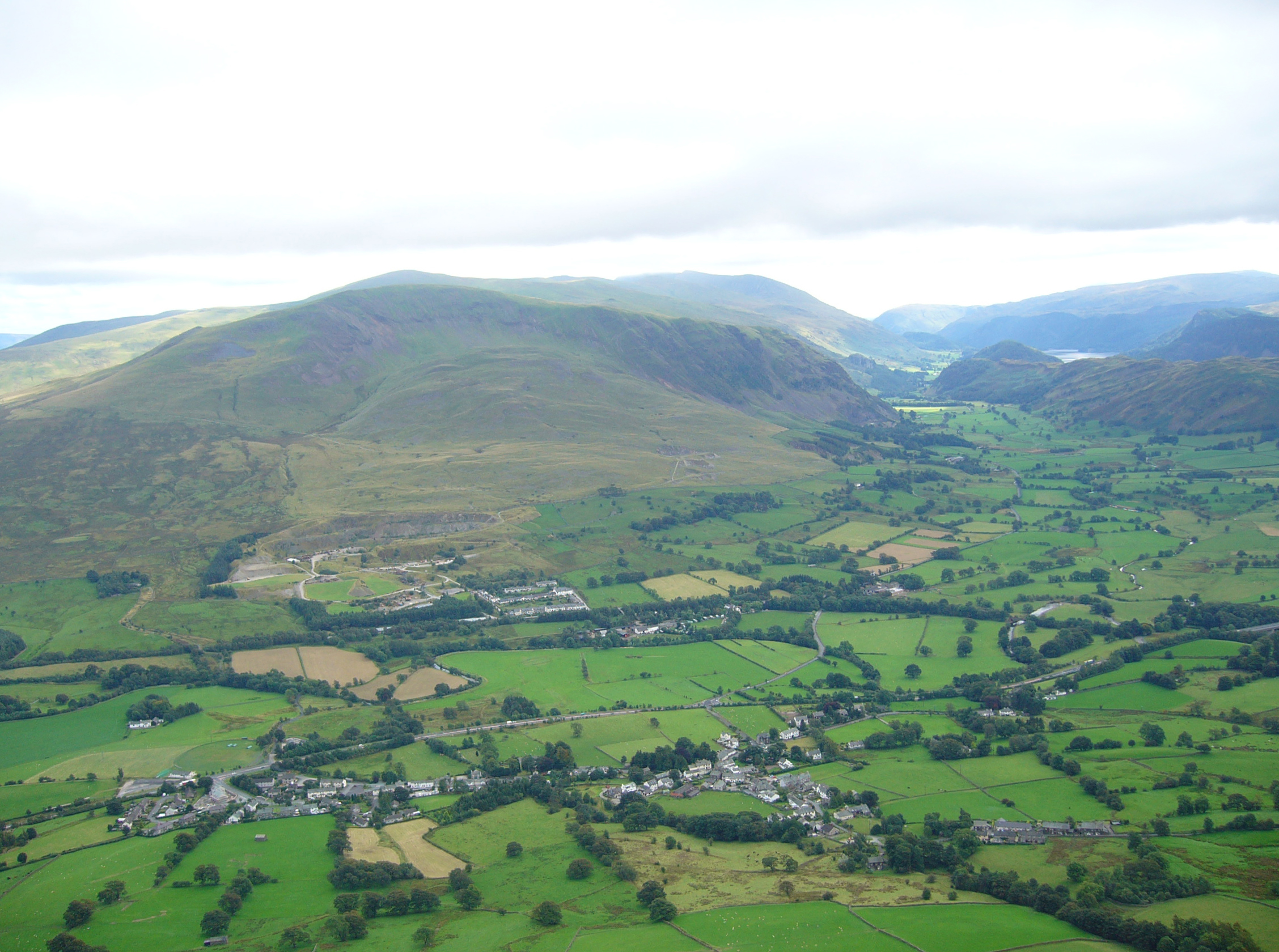
View of St John’s in the Vale from Blencathra.
