= A595 road =

Road in Cumbria, England

A595

Major junctions
- North end: Carlisle
- A7 A596 A591 A594 road A5086; A66 A597 A5094 A5093 A5093 A593 A5092 A590
- South end: Dalton-in-Furness; 54.1639°N 3.1888°W

Location
- Country: United Kingdom
- Primary destinations: Workington; Whitehaven; Barrow-in-Furness

Road network
- Roads in the United Kingdom; Motorways; A and B road zones

The A595 is a primary route in Cumbria, in Northern England that starts in Carlisle, passes through Whitehaven and goes close to Workington, Cockermouth and Wigton. It passes Sellafield and Ravenglass before ending at the Dalton-in-Furness by-pass, in southern Cumbria, where it joins the A590 trunk road. The road is mostly single carriageway, apart from in central Carlisle, where it passes the castle as a busy dual carriageway road named Castle Way, and prior to that as Bridge Street and Church Street, where it passes close to the McVitie's or Carr's biscuit factory. The Lillyhall bypass is also dual carriageway.

The road in the Whitehaven area was laid out in the 1930s and the A595 was designated a trunk route in 1946. It was detrunked in 1998, apart from an 18-mile (29 km) section between Little Clifton and Calder Bridge. This section represents the route from Sellafield to the A66.

At Duddon Bridge and at Dove Ford near Grizebeck the road passes through farmyards.

== Route ==
=== Northern section ===
The 85-mile (137 km) long A595 is also known as the Cumbrian Coast Road despite much of the road following in an inland route. Starting at the Hardwicke Circus roundabout junction with the A7 in Carlisle, it forms a short section of dual carriageway known as Castle Way. This section passes Carlisle Castle and Tullie House. Prior to the construction of Castle Way, the road was split in 2 at this section. It then continues over Caldew Bridge to a thoroughfare called Caldewgate, before arriving at a roundabout close to the McVitie's factory in the city centre. It then follows the route of Wigton Road through the district of Morton, before reaching the outer boundary of Carlisle. At this point it passes the start point of the Carlisle Northern Development Route, where construction work commenced in 2009. This route is the A689. A further roundabout was constructed in 2011 around 1 mile south of Carlisle in anticipation of increased traffic for a nearby garden centre development.

The route continues in a south-westerly direction until it reaches a roundabout on the outskirts of Thursby at a junction with A596. The roads previously met in the centre of the village of Thursby, before the construction of the Thursby bypass in the 1980s. The A595 runs largely parallel to A596, before the A596 terminates in Workington.

The road then continues in a southerly direction, passing close to the town of Wigton. A staggered crossroads at the section provides access to Wigton and also the B5305 towards Penrith. The twin transmitters of Caldbeck and Sandale are visible close to this section of the road.

The next section follows a meandering path through several hamlets, before reaching the village of Bothel, where the A591 from Keswick terminates. The road then passes the site of the former Moota motel. Here it forms the boundary of the Lake District National Park for a little over 3 miles. This section of the route is notable for the two long straight sections, which are fairly rare on the A595. The road once again meanders until the roundabout junction with the A594 road from Cockermouth to Maryport. It then passes over the River Derwent via Papcastle Bridge before turning west and becoming the part of the A66 until Little Clifton. During the 2009 Cumbrian floods, the Papcastle bridge was briefly closed, essentially splitting West Cumbria in two. With bridge collapses and damage on the nearby A596, and a road closure on the A591, the only passable route to anywhere north of the River Derwent was via the A66 and M6 to Carlisle – a diversion of over 90 miles (140 km).

At this point the road turns towards Lillyhall, passing through Lillyhall Industrial Estate and joining the Distington bypass, constructed in 2008. This section of road is notable as it is the only section of national speed limit dual carriageway along the whole length of the road. The end of the dual carriageway section is a roundabout junction near Lowca rejoining the original A595 road. It is then a short journey along the coast to the edge of Whitehaven.

=== Southern section ===
The road passes through Loop Road North & Loop Road South in Whitehaven passing the suburbs of the Highlands, Hill Crest and Hensingham. It forms the Hensingham bypass at this section, constructed in the 1980s to ease the passage of construction traffic to Sellafield through a particularly narrow and busy section of the road. It then passes close to West Cumberland Hospital and West Lakes Science & Technology Park. There is a campaign to build a bypass from the recently built Distington Bypass to this part of the A595 to ease congestion in the Whitehaven area.

After this, the road the passes near to Moor Row and through the centre of Bigrigg, before heading downhill to Egremont. The northbound side of the road here was upgraded in the 1980s to provide an extra uphill lane for overtaking due to the steep gradient. At the bottom of the hill the roundabout forms a junction with the A5086 which gives access to Cleator Moor and eventually Cockermouth.

The A595 the forms the Egremont bypass. This bypass was built in the early '90s as a result of an investment by BNFL in local infrastructure following the siting of the THORP reprocessing plant at Sellafield. Prior to the bypass, the A595 originally passed right through the middle of town of Egremont. Once past the village of Thornhill, the sprawling Sellafield nuclear site is visible. Twin cooling towers previously dominated the skyline here, however they were demolished in 2007.

The road then passes Beckermet and Calder Bridge, junctions here give access to the Sellafield site. From Calder Bridge, the A595 forms the boundary of the Lake District National Park, going between the villages of Seascale and Gosforth. It enters the national park at the bridge over the River Irt at Holmrook and continues past the village of Ravenglass, then passes through over the River Esk at Hinning House bridge before passing through the villages of Waberthwaite and Bootle and round the foot of Black Combe.

At Whicham the road has a TOTSO (turn off to stay on) junction with the A5093, close to the town of Millom, taking a north-easterly route along Whicham Valley. For much of this stretch, the road is close to or is the boundary of the Lake District National Park. At Duddon Bridge, the road crosses the river Duddon which previously marked the boundary of the historic county of Cumberland and Lancashire. The road then turns towards Broughton-in-Furness and used to go through it but now diverts via Foxfield before turning north to rejoin its old route, then once again turning south. At Grizebeck, the A5092 then branches off the road to connect with the A590 forming another TOTSO. This is also the point at which the A595 ceases to be the boundary to the Lake District National Park.

The road finally passes through Kirkby-in-Furness, Ireleth and Askam-in-Furness before terminating 1.8 miles (2.9 km) further south at Elliscales roundabout where it crosses the Dalton bypass A590.

The last section of the road is particularly narrow and even passes through a farmyard, though plans have been approved to bypass this with the original road anticipated to become private access.

== Safety ==
The road, along with the A66, is considered to be the most dangerous road in Cumbria, and has several accident blackspots. The stretch through Moota is regularly the scene of fatal accidents. The northern section was formerly a trunk road, but until the recent completion of the Distington Bypass it had only one small section of dual carriageway. The southern section of the road around New Mill does not have a secondary route. When this section is closed due to an accident or roadworks, the detour routes are via Wrynose and Hardknott mountain passes for cars, and via the M6 J40 for HGVs, the latter being a detour of 120 miles (190 km). The poor safety record of the road is highlighted by signs erected on the route stating "1245 casualties in 5 years".

== Road schemes ==
=== Carlisle Northern Development Route (A689) ===
The Carlisle Northern Development Route (CNDR) is a 5-mile (8.0 km) long north-western bypass of Carlisle, which replaced the main road through the city (Wigton Road, Church Street, Bridge Street and Castle Way) and diverted traffic from the city's roads. The road is single carriageway, with a number of roundabout junctions, as well as a new bridge over the River Eden. The route begins near Newby West (to the west of the city), before meeting the B5307 (the road to Abbeytown). Shortly afterwards it crosses over the River Eden, and curves round to the north of the Kingstown Industrial Estate, and terminates at Junction 44 of the M6 motorway.

The development of the route suffered several setbacks. In August 2008 a discovery of a great crested newt colony led to a delay in the start of the project. In February 2009 a potentially important Stone Age find was discovered during surveying work. The most serious problem to face the development was the near collapse of the bank providing the funds under a private finance initiative. Belgian bank Dexia was involved in a £5 billion bailout during the Credit Crunch. A consortium of banks later stepped in to provide the funding, and construction got underway. The bypass opened in Spring 2012.

=== Parton to Lillyhall improvements ===
The Parton to Lillyhall bypass was opened in December 2008 after a period of 18 months construction. The road runs from the junction with the A596 at Lillyhall to a new junction created close to the A595 junction for Lowca. The new road replaces a winding, narrow section of the A595 which passed through the village of Distington. Prior to this project the A595 was considered for de-trunking, meaning the scheme would have become the responsibility of Cumbria County Council. However, it was not de-trunked, and has instead been listed in the government's Targeted Programme of Improvements.

=== Whitehaven Eastern Relief Road ===
Former Copeland MP Jamie Reed and Cumbria County Council leader Stewart Young pressed the UK government for an eastern relief road to take the A595 away from a bottleneck through the town of Whitehaven. The proposed route would have connected with the recent Parton to Lillyhall bypass, it would then pass to the east of the town, past the newly proposed replacement for West Cumberland Hospital, then finally passing West Lakes Science & Technology Park before joining the current A595 south of Whitehaven. Plans are being drawn up as part of the Energy Coast masterplan to regenerate West Cumbria.

== See also ==
- Sellafield (multi-function nuclear site)
