= A594 road (Cumbria) =

Road in Cumbria, England

Coordinates: 54°41′48″N 3°26′10″W

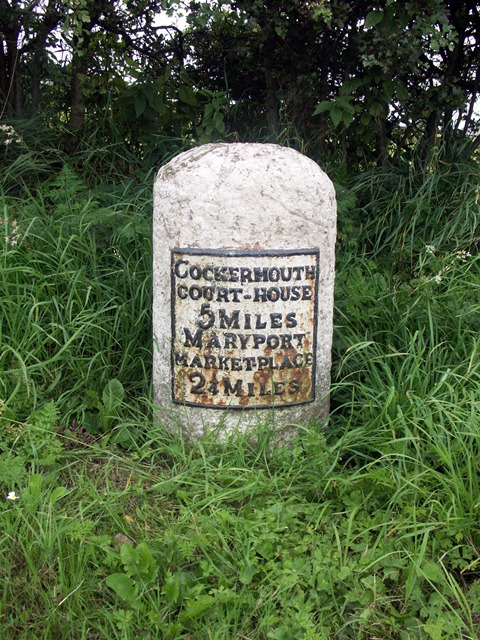
Old Milestone by the A594, south of Dearham

The A594 is a main road in Cumbria, that runs between the A596 in Maryport and the A595 on the outskirts of Cockermouth. Its total length is around 6 miles (9.7 km).

The inner ring road in Leicester is also numbered as the A594.

== History ==
The original route of the A594 was from Maryport to Penrith via Cockermouth, Keswick, Threlkeld, Penruddock and Greystoke. This route is now mostly parts of the A66, A591, A5271 and the B5288 roads. The road number changed to coincide with the opening of the M6 motorway through what is now Cumbria.
