= A66 road =

Trans-Pennine A road in Northern England

A66

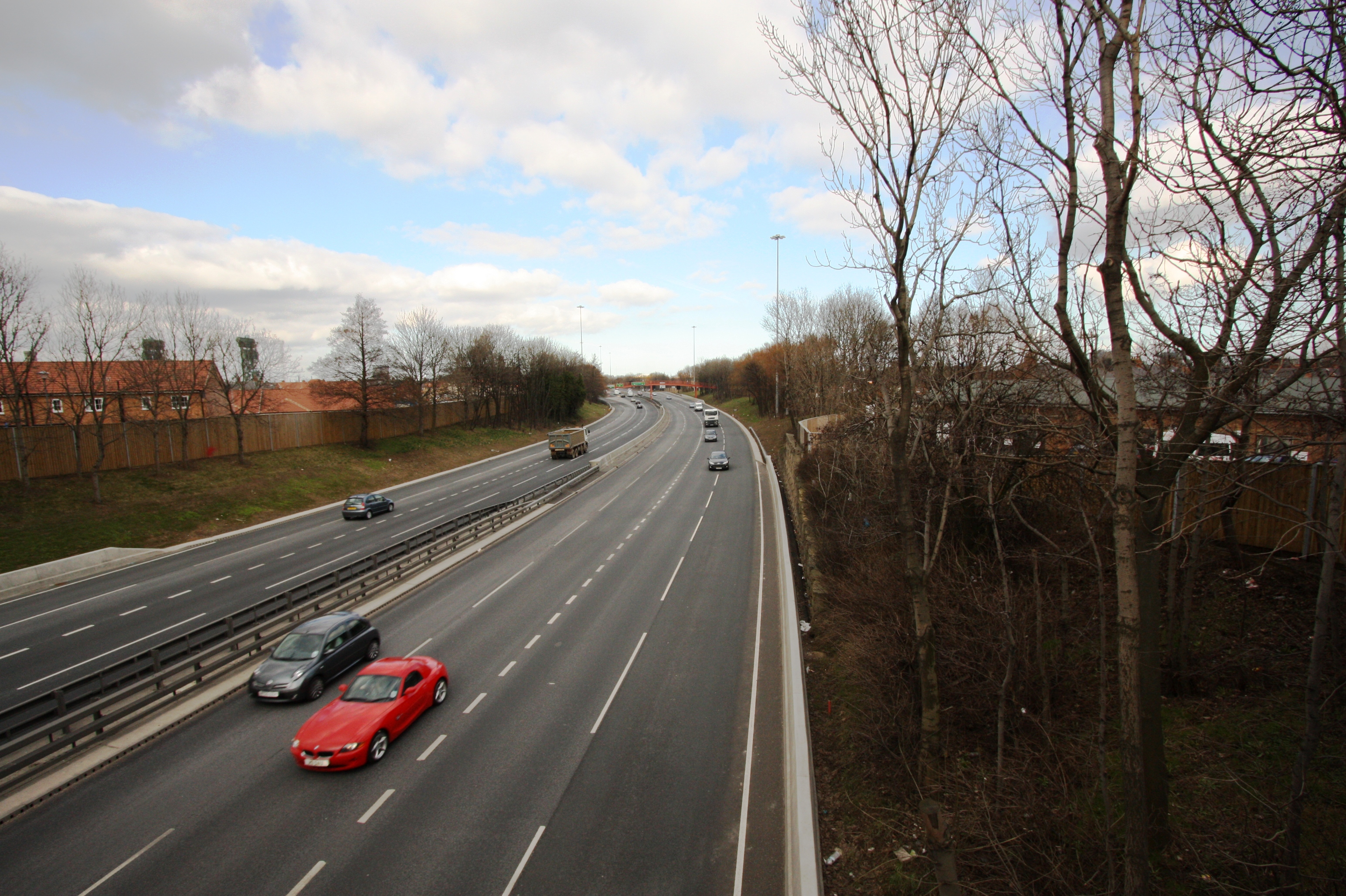

Route information
- Length: 114.6 mi (184.4 km)

Major junctions
- From: A595 in Workington

- M6 near Penrith; A6 near Penrith; A67 in Bowes A1(M) near Middleton Tyas; A67 in Darlington; A19 in Middlesbrough

- To: A1053 in Grangetown

Location
- Country: United Kingdom
- Counties: Cumbria; County Durham; North Yorkshire
- Primary destinations: Keswick, Penrith, Brough, Scotch Corner, Darlington, Stockton-on-Tees, Middlesbrough

Road network
- Roads in the United Kingdom; Motorways; A and B road zones
← A65	→ A67

The A66 is a major road in Northern England, which in part follows the course of the Roman road from Scotch Corner to Penrith. It runs from east of Middlesbrough in North Yorkshire to Workington in Cumbria. The road has been progressively improved with dual carriageway sections, but with stretches of single carriageway road. The road is set to be completely dualled between Scotch Corner and Penrith, with a £1.3 billion scheme being announced in March 2024.

== Route ==
From its eastern terminus between Redcar and Middlesbrough it runs past Stockton-on-Tees and Darlington mainly as two-lane dual-carriageway and single carriageway past Darlington, becoming motorway standard as the A66(M) shortly before meeting junction 57 of the A1(M). It shares the A1(M) route south to Scotch Corner, from where it continues west across the Pennines, past Brough, Appleby, Kirkby Thore, Temple Sowerby and Penrith until it reaches Junction 40 of the M6 motorway at Skirsgill Interchange, where traffic going towards Western Scotland turns onto the northbound M6. The A66 continues past Blencathra to Keswick and Cockermouth and on through the northern reaches of the Lake District before arriving at the coastal town of Workington. There is a short stretch of dual carriageway along the northern part of Bassenthwaite Lake between Keswick and Cockermouth. Whilst the eastbound section follows the straight line of the disused Cockermouth, Keswick and Penrith Railway, the westbound section has numerous bends with climbs and dips. The westbound section was closed due to flood damage in December 2015; when it re-opened in May 2016, the road had been permanently reduced to a single lane. This section has a 50-mile-per-hour (80 km/h) limit monitored by average speed cameras.

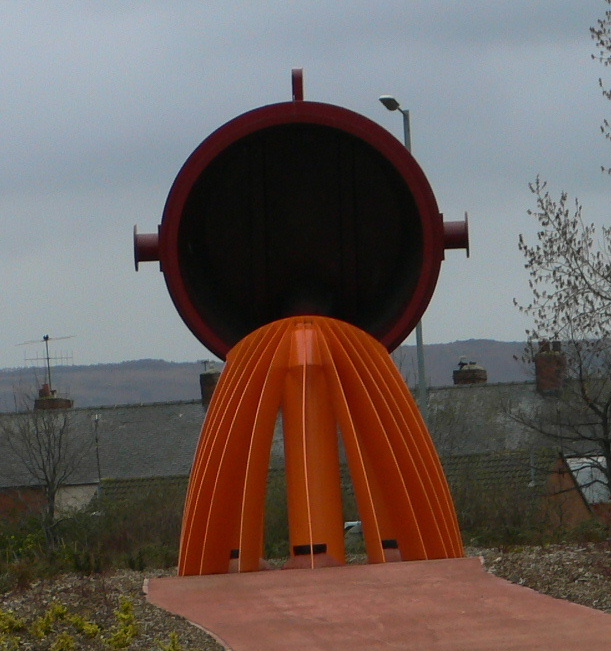
Ladle of Steel sculpture on the second to last roundabout before the A66 meets its eastern end

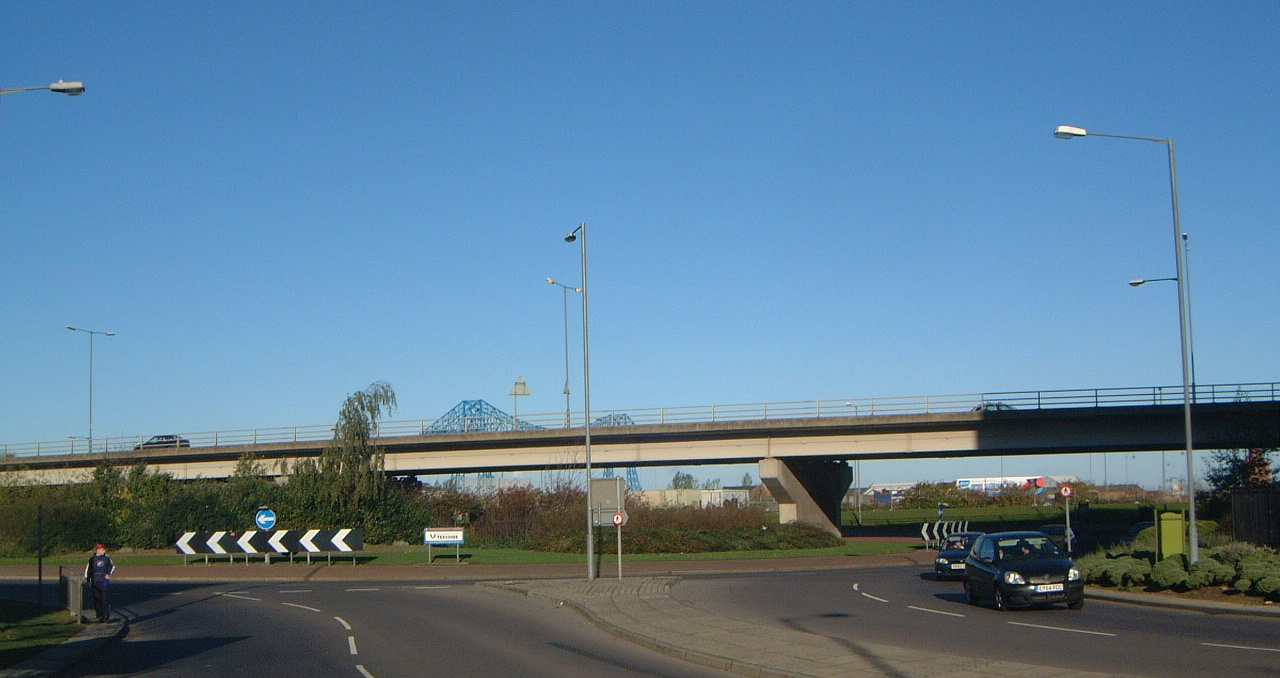
A66 elevated section in Middlesbrough, with the Transporter Bridge in the background at centre left

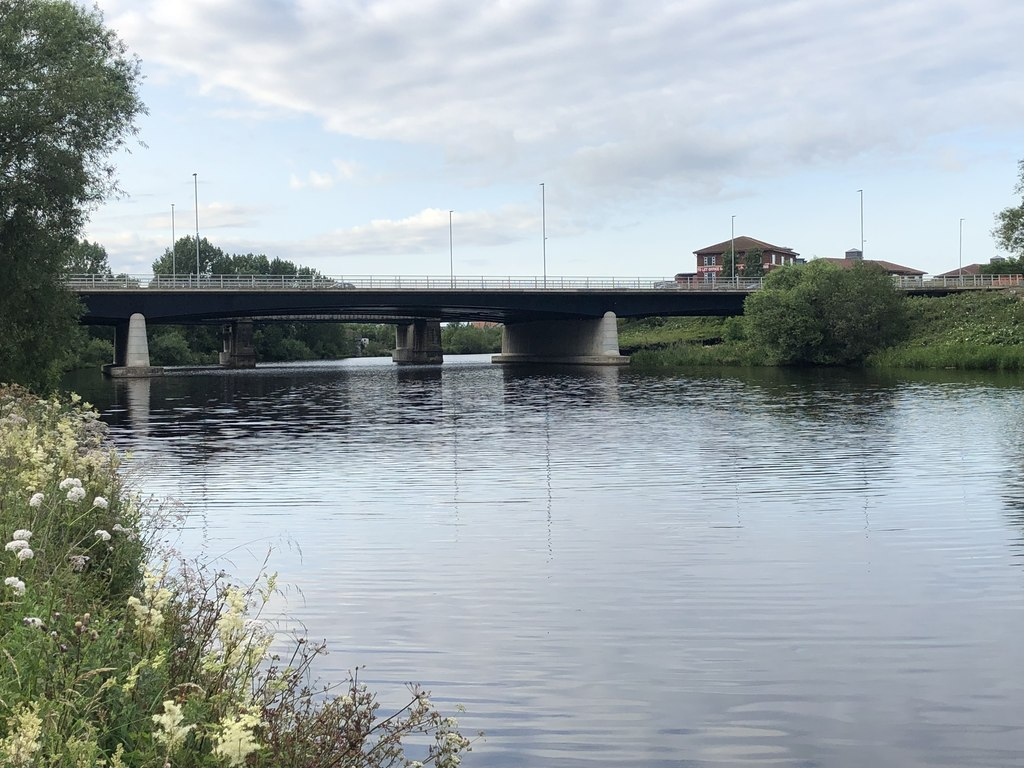
Surtees Bridge near Stockton-on-Tees, looking at the west-bound carriageway

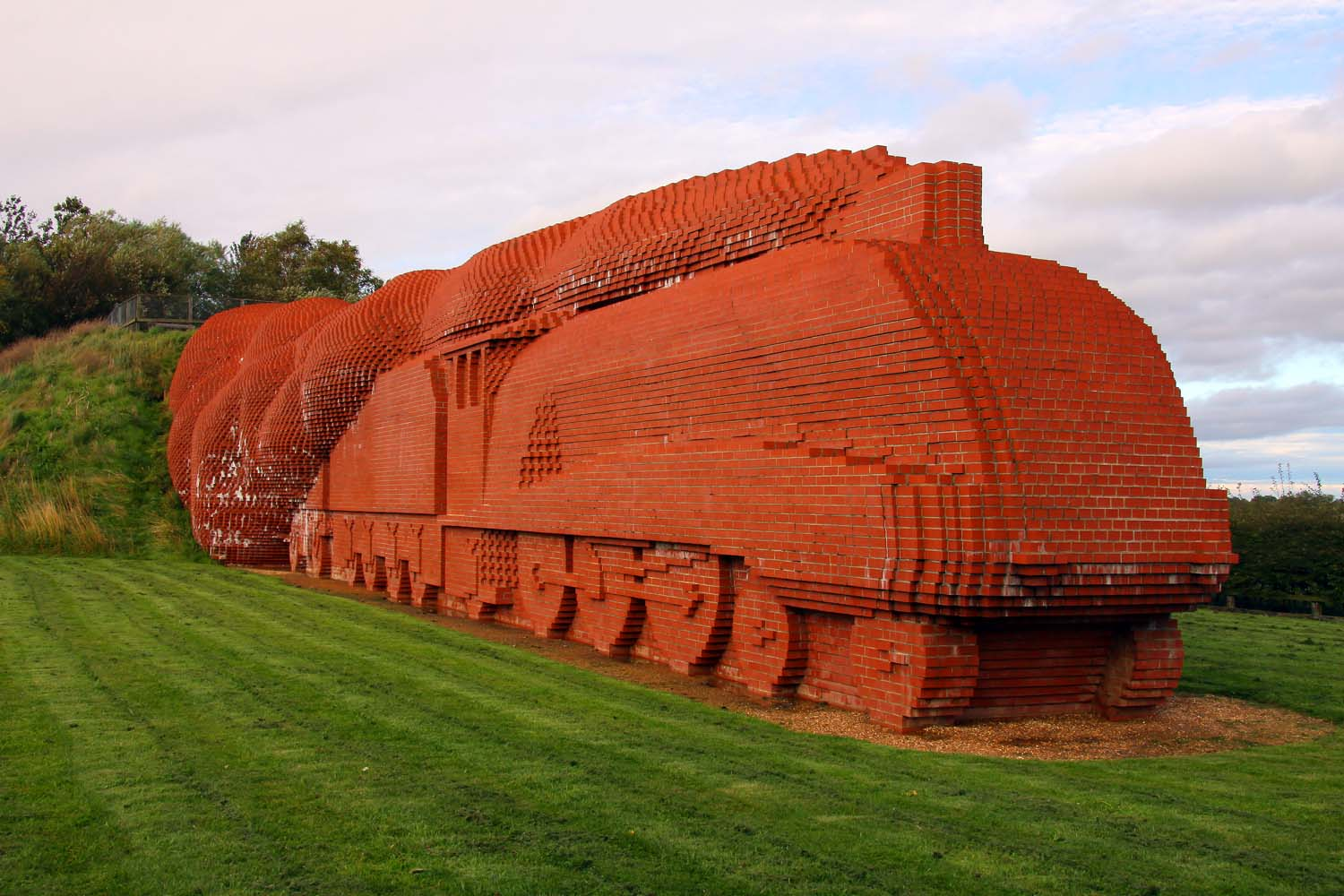
East of Darlington, the A66 passes the Brick Train sculpture

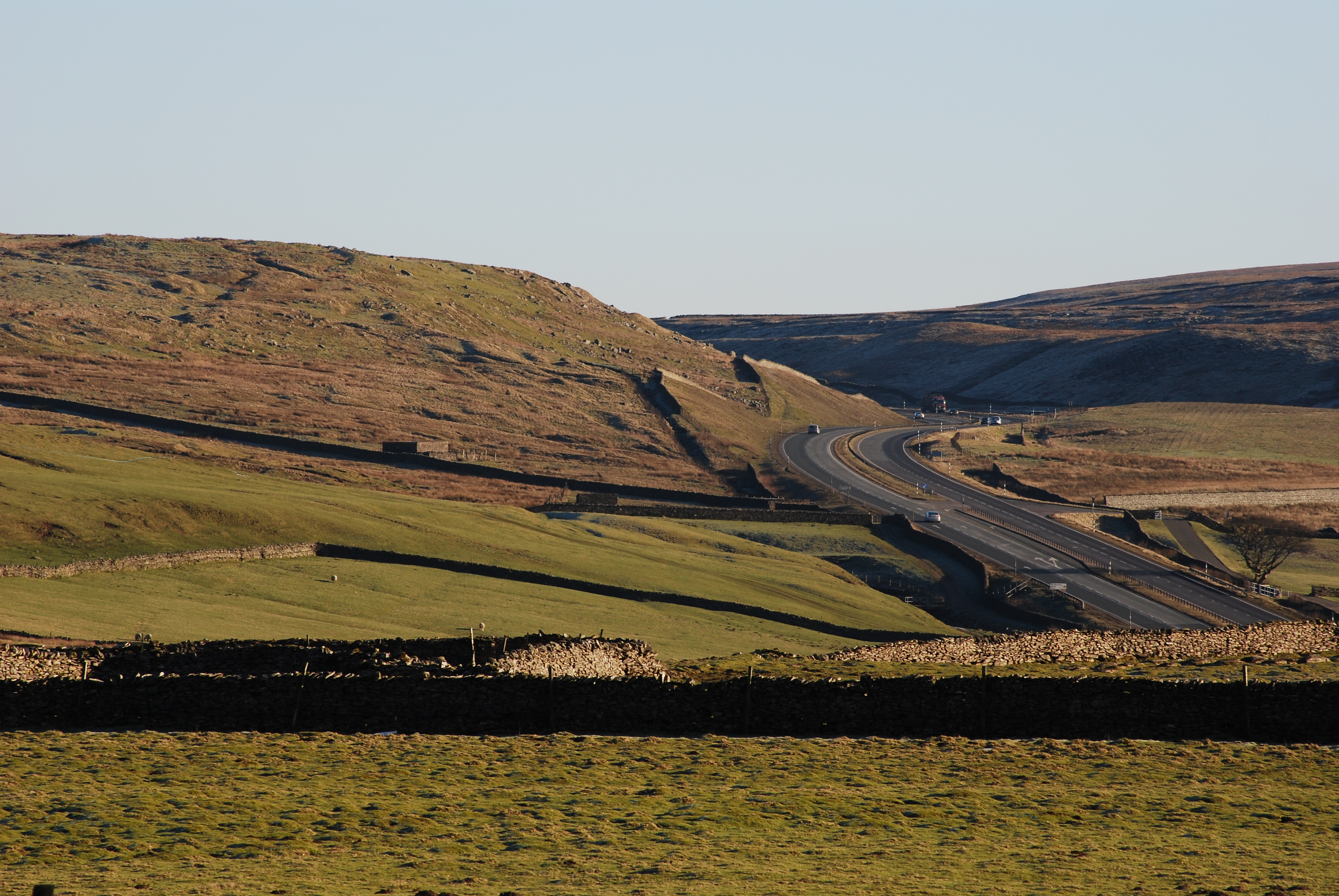
Eastbound view from Stainmore Café car park

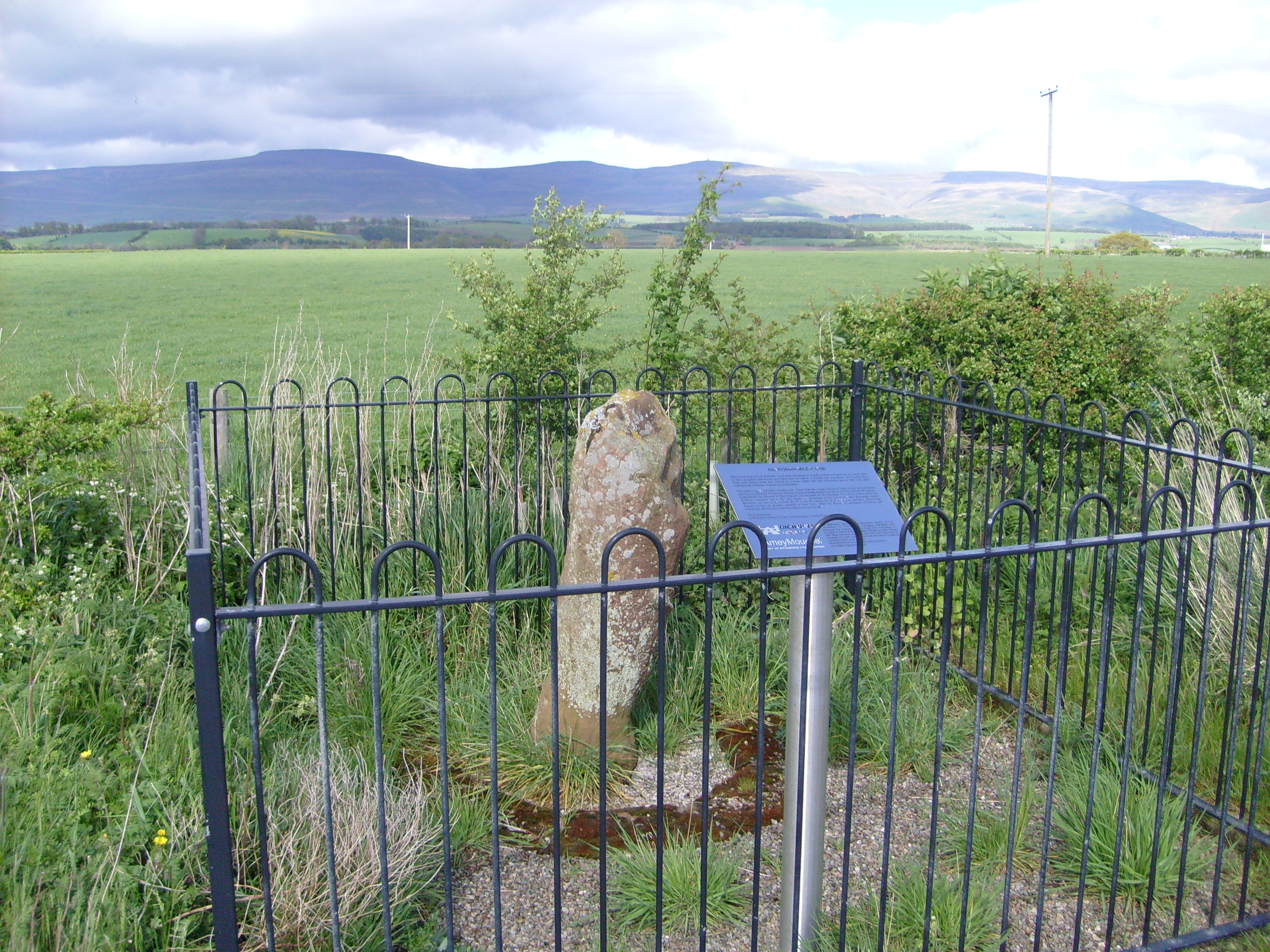
Roman milestone on the former A66 route between Kirkby Thore and Temple Sowerby

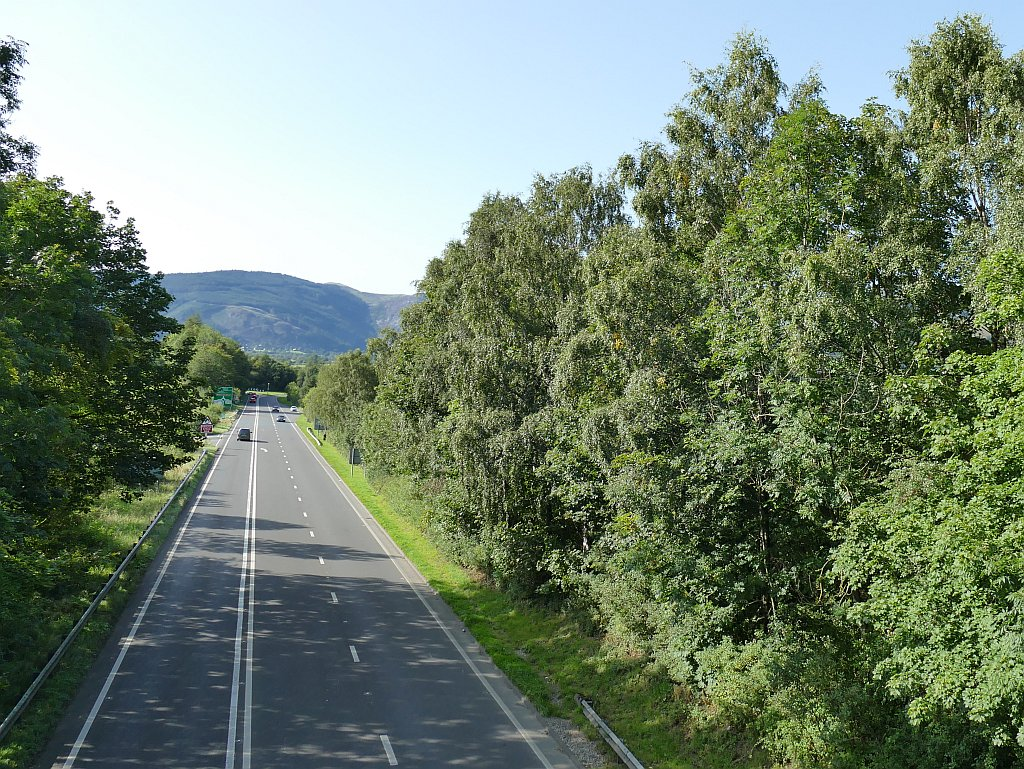
Keswick Bypass

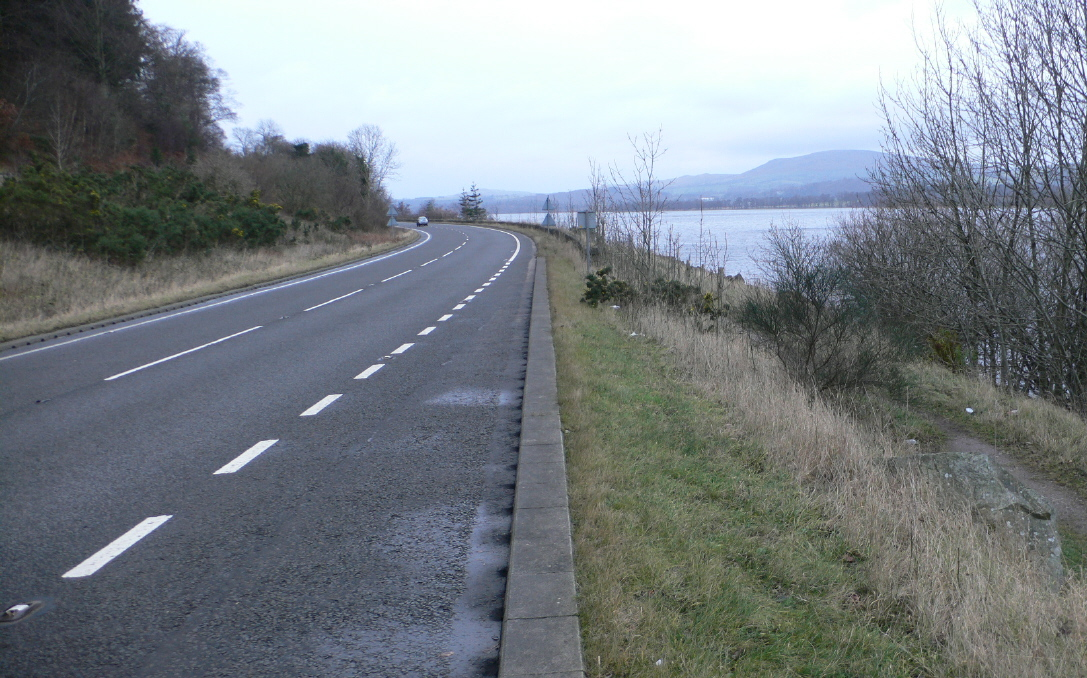
A66 at Bassenthwaite Lake, looking west

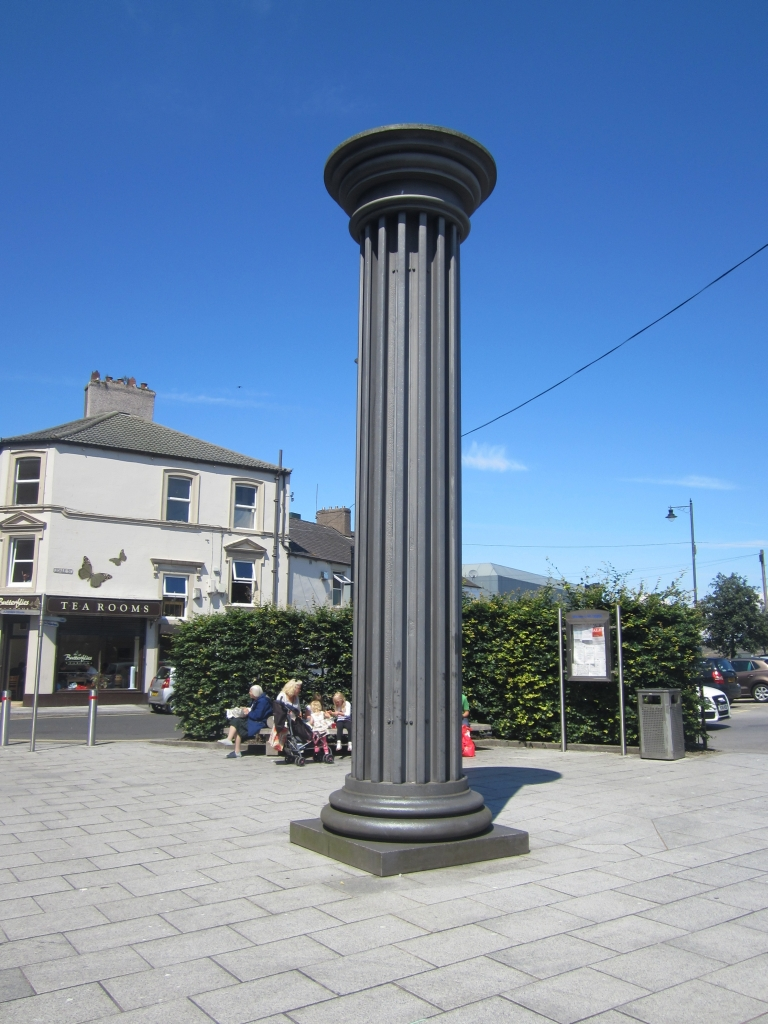
Curwens Column, in Curwen Square, Workington, in view where the A66 meets its western end

== History ==
When road numbers were first designated in the 1920s, the A66 was assigned to the route between Penrith and Hull via Scotch Corner and York, mainly along former Roman roads. Today's route largely follows the original route between Penrith and Scotch Corner. The historic route between Scotch Corner and Hull follows what is now today's A1, A168, B6265, A59 and A1079.

It is anomalously numbered since west of Penrith it trespasses into numbering zone 5; this is because it originally terminated at the A6 in Penrith but was extended further west in order to create one continuous east–west route. Most of what is now the A66 west of Penrith was originally A594 – only a small stub of this road numbering remains, from Maryport to Cockermouth.

== Proposed developments ==
=== Trans-Pennine dualling ===
The middle 49.5 miles (79.7 km) section of the A66 between Scotch Corner on the A1(M) and Penrith on the M6 forms one of the key trans-Pennines trunk routes and has one of the worst road-safety records in the UK. Various bypasses and upgrades have been constructed since the early 1970s, giving the current mix of single and dual-carriageway sections. In 2002, after many years of local campaigning, the Transport Minister, John Spellar, gave support for the upgrading of the remaining single-carriageway sections by the Highways Agency. The first three projects began construction in early 2006 and opened in 2007 and 2008. The whole route between the A1(M) and M6 was due to be dualled by 2011, by which time the upgrade of the A1 to motorway status at Scotch Corner was planned to be complete.

After the construction of several sections commenced, it was announced that those schemes currently in the planning phase would not go ahead until 2016 at the earliest. The Highways Agency website states "Other than those already committed, the Regions did not identify any other major schemes for the A66 as high priorities to receive funding. This means that there is currently no likelihood of any additional major schemes on this route being funded within the next ten-year period. However the Regional Funding Allocation process will be reviewed in due course and this will give an opportunity for the Regions to revise their priorities."

In September 2015, the government said that £500,000 would be invested into the study of the two Trans-Pennine routes of the A66 and the A69. The proposal would be for one or even both roads to be dualled wholly between the A1/A1(M) and the M6. The following year the government announced that the A66 would be dualled, but not the A69. In March 2019, project director Matt Townsend from Highways England announced plans for a public consultation from May 2019, in which it would present its plans for a £500 million spend to complete dualling the Trans-Pennine section, together with improvements at the M6 and A1(M) interchanges.

In March 2024, Transport Secretary Mark Harper approved a £1.3 billion scheme to dual the A66 in its entirety between Scotch Corner and Penrith. Work would begin on the scheme in the latter half of 2024.

Section	Start	End	Section length (miles)	Dual carriageway opened	Notes
M6–A6	M6 J40	A6	0.7	1971	
Penrith Bypass	A6	Brougham	1.5	1971	
Penrith–Temple Sowerby	Brougham	Winderwath	2.8	–	Under construction
Temple Sowerby Bypass	Winderwath	Temple Sowerby East	2.6	2007	
Temple Sowerby–Appleby	Temple Sowerby East	Crackenthorpe	4.4	–	Projected 2030
Appleby Bypass	Crackenthorpe	Coupland	3.7	By 1982	
Warcop Bypass	Coupland	Brough West	4.4	–	Projected
Brough Bypass	Brough West	Brough East	2.0	1977	
Brough–Stainmore	Brough East	Stainmore	1.0	1994	
Stainmore Bypass	Stainmore	Banks Gate	2.4	1992	
Bowes Moor	Banks Gate	Bowes West	8.7	1993	
Bowes Bypass	Bowes West	Bowes East	1.1	–	Projected
Boldron Bypass	Bowes East	Cross Lanes	2.5	By 1983	
Cross Lanes–Greta Bridge	Cross Lanes	Greta Bridge West	1.6	–	Projected
Greta Bridge Bypass	Greta Bridge West	Greta Bridge East	1.5	1980	
Greta Bridge–Stephen Bank	Greta Bridge East	Stephen Bank	2.3	2008	
Stephen Bank–Carkin Moor	Stephen Bank	Carkin Moor	2.5	–	Projected
Carkin Moor–Scotch Corner (A1(M))	Carkin Moor	Scotch Corner (A1(M))	3.8	2007	

Additionally, a plan to create a second crossing of the River Tees near Middlesbrough for traffic on the congested A19 road would see the widening of the A66 between Teesside Park and the Tees Viaduct interchange.

== Safety ==
The section of road between Scotch Corner and Penrith accounted for 70 deaths over ten years up until 2002, which was above the national average for single lane carriageways. Whilst the number of accidents was in line with the national average, the number of serious injuries and deaths was twice the national average; this high attrition rate was the reason for the go-ahead for the new dualled sections on the grounds of safety.

Snow gates were installed on the road between Bowes and Brough in 2012. This section is the moorland route over Stainmore summit which reaches a height of 1,450 feet (440 m). This is prone to heavy snow in the winter. Both sets of gates have turnaround facilities to allow all traffic to change direction.

In 2024–5, Keith Buchan, a highly experienced transport planner, examined the safety record of the A66 and the evidence submitted during the planning examination for the £1.5 billion A66 Northern Trans-Pennine project. In the 'Improving safety on the A66' report, he makes recommendations for safety improvements on the A66 which could be implemented now, at low cost, rather than waiting five years for the £1.5 billion A66 scheme to be built.

== Accidents and incidents ==
- 2010 A66 Keswick coach accident – on 24 May 2010, three people were killed, four were seriously injured and approximately 30 people sustained less severe injuries after a car collided with a coach carrying children home from Keswick School on the A66 in Cumbria.
- In the early hours of 22 August 2026, seven people, including two police officers, were killed in a crash on the A66 in South Bank, near Middlesbrough. This led to a wider investigation into organised crime.

== Junction list ==
County	Location	mi	km	Destinations	Notes
Cumbria	Workington	0.0	0.0	A596 to A595 – Town centre, Whitehaven, Carlisle, Maryport	Western terminus
Cumbria	Little Clifton	3.0	4.8	A595 south / Main Road – Whitehaven, Bridgefoot, Great Clifton	Western terminus of A595 concurrency
Cumbria	Brigham– Cockermouth boundary	6.5	10.5	A595 north / Low Road – Maryport, Carlisle, Cockermouth	Eastern terminus of A595 concurrency
Cumbria	Cockermouth	7.8	12.6	A5086 (Lamplugh Road) – Cockermouth, Egremont	
Cumbria	Underskiddaw	20.6	33.2	A591 north (Crosthwaite Road) / A5271 east to B5289 – Carlisle, Keswick, Borrowdale	To B5289 and Borrowdale signed westbound only; western terminus of A591 concurrency; western terminus of A5271
Cumbria	Keswick	21.9– 22.2	35.2– 35.7	A591 south – Windermere, Keswick	Eastern terminus of A591 concurrency
Cumbria	Troutbeck	29.2	47.0	A5091 south / Regional Route 71 – Troutbeck, Dockray, Ullswater	Northern terminus of A5091
Cumbria	Dacre	36.2	58.3	A592 south – Ullswater, Stainton	Stainton signed westbound only; western terminus of A592 concurrency
Cumbria	Penrith	37.1	59.7	M6 – Carlisle, Preston, Kendal A592 north (Ullswater Road) – Penrith	Eastern terminus of A592 concurrency; M6 junction 40
Cumbria	Penrith	37.8	60.8	A6 (Bridge Lane / Kemplay Bank) / A686 north (Carleton Avenue) – Penrith, Shap, Alston	Southern terminus of A686
Cumbria	Brougham	42.6– 42.7	68.6– 68.7	To B6412 – Culgaith, Temple Sowerby, Cliburn	Junction
Cumbria	Temple Sowerby	44.3	71.3	Temple Sowerby, Morland	Junction
Cumbria	Crackenthorpe– Appleby-in-Westmorland boundary	49.4– 49.7	79.5– 80.0	B6542 – Appleby, Orton, Hilton, Murton	Junction; eastbound exit and westbound entrance
Cumbria	Murton	52.1	83.8	B6542 – Appleby, Orton, Brampton, Dufton, Hilton, Murton	Junction; westbound exit and eastbound entrance
Cumbria	Helbeck– Brough boundary	57.8	93.0	B6276 – Brough, Middleton-in-Teesdale	Junction; eastbound exit only
Cumbria	Brough, Cumbria	58.2– 58.5	93.7– 94.1	A685 south to M6 / B6276 – Kendal, Kirkby Stephen, Brough	B6276 and Brough signed westbound only; northern terminus of A685
County Durham	Bowes	71.3	114.7	A67 east to A688 – Bowes, Barnard Castle, Bishop Auckland	Junction; eastbound exit and westbound entrance; western terminus of A67
North Yorkshire	Middleton Tyas	86.6– 86.8	139.4– 139.7	A1(M) south – The South, Wetherby, Leeds A6055 south / Middleton Tyas Lane to A6108 – Richmond, Middleton Tyas	Western terminus of A1(M) concurrency westbound and A6055 concurrency eastbound
North Yorkshire	Middleton Tyas	86.9	139.9	A6055 north to B6275 – Barton, Piercebridge	Information signed eastbound only; eastern terminus of A6055 concurrency eastbound; western terminus of A1(M) concurrency eastbound
North Yorkshire	Barton	88.2– 88.7	141.9– 142.7	B6275 – Piercebridge, Barton	Junction; A1(M) junction 56
North Yorkshire	Manfield	90.9	146.3	A1(M) north – Durham, Newcastle	Junction; eastbound exit and westbound entrance; eastern terminus of A1(M) concurrency; western terminus of A66(M) concurrency; A1(M) junction 57
North Yorkshire	93.1	149.8	Barton	Eastern terminus of A66(M) concurrency; eastern terminus of A66(M)	
County Durham	Darlington	93.8	151.0	A67 west (Carmel Road) / A167 (Grange Road / Croft Road) / A68 / A168 – Darlington, Barnard Castle, Bishop Auckland, Hurworth Place, Hurworth-on-Tees, Northallerton, Thirsk	Hurworths signed eastbound only; western terminus of A67 concurrency
County Durham	Morton Palms	97.2	156.4	A67 east / B6280 (Yarm Road) – Yarm, Darlington, Middleton St George	Middleton signed westbound only; eastern terminus of A67 concurrency
County Durham	Great Burdon– Morton Palms boundary	98.8	159.0	A1150 west to A1(M) – The North, Durham, Darlington (N)	Darlington signed westbound only; eastern terminus of A1150
County Durham	Sadberge	99.7	160.5	Sadberge	Junction; westbound exit and entrance
County Durham	Longnewton	101.7– 102.1	163.7– 164.3	Longnewton, Urlay Nook	Junction
County Durham	Elton	104.2– 104.5	167.7– 168.2	Redmarshall, Eaglescliffe, Hartburn, Elton	Junction
County Durham	Stockton-on-Tees	105.6– 105.9	169.9– 170.4	To A135 – Stockton (W), Yarm	Junction
County Durham	Stockton-on-Tees	6.5– 6.8	10.5– 10.9	A135 – Stockton, Ingleby Barwick	Junction
North Yorkshire	Thornaby-on-Tees	107.0– 107.7	172.2– 173.3	Thornaby	Junction
North Yorkshire	Thornaby-on-Tees	107.9– 108.2	173.6– 174.1	Teesdale	Junction
North Yorkshire	Middlesbrough	108.5– 109.0	174.6– 175.4	A19 to A1027 / A689 / A174 – The North, The South, Billingham, Hartlepool, Teesport, Whitby	Junction; only A19, The North and The South signed westbound
North Yorkshire	Middlesbrough	109.3– 109.8	175.9– 176.7	Riverside Park, Cannon Park	Junction
North Yorkshire	Middlesbrough	110.0– 110.4	177.0– 177.7	Middlesbrough centre (N & W), Riverside Park	Junction; Riverside Park signed westbound only
North Yorkshire	Middlesbrough	110.8– 111.1	178.3– 178.8	Middlesbrough centre (N & E)	Junction
North Yorkshire	Middlesbrough	111.3	179.1	A172 south – Stokesley	Junction; eastbound exit and westbound entrance; northern terminus of A172
North Yorkshire	Middlesbrough	111.5– 111.7	179.4– 179.8	Middlehaven, North Ormesby	Junction
North Yorkshire	Middlesbrough	112.1	180.4	A171 south (Cargo Fleet Lane) / Works Road (B1513) – Whitby, Guisborough	Northern terminus of A171
North Yorkshire	Grangetown	114.6	184.4	A1053 (Tees Dock Road) to A174 – Redcar, Teesport	Eastern terminus
1.000 mi = 1.609 km; 1.000 km = 0.621 mi: Concurrency terminus; Incomplete access

== A66(M) motorway ==
A66(M)
- A66(M) highlighted in blue

Route information
- Maintained by National Highways
- Length: 2.0 mi (3.2 km)
- Existed: 1965–present

Major junctions
- From: Cleasby
- A1(M) motorway
- To: Stapleton

Location
- Country: United Kingdom

Road network
- Roads in the United Kingdom; Motorways; A and B road zones
← A64(M)	→ A74(M)

The A66(M) is a spur from the A1(M) at Junction 57. It was opened in 1965 along with the A1(M) as part of the Darlington by-pass motorway. It can be accessed only by northbound traffic on the A1(M) and has an exit to this route southbound only.

=== Junctions ===
County	Location	mi	km	Junctions	Destinations	Notes
North Yorkshire	Stapleton-on-Tees	0	0	54.4999°N 1.6273°W	A1(M) – The South, Scotch Corner	No entrance to A1(M) Northbound, no entrance from A1(M) Southbound
North Yorkshire	Stapleton-on-Tees	2.2	3.5	54.5090°N 1.5860°W	A66 – Darlington, Teesside Airport; Barton	
1.000 mi = 1.609 km; 1.000 km = 0.621 mi: Incomplete access
