= Brick Train =

Sculpture by David Mach near Darlington, England

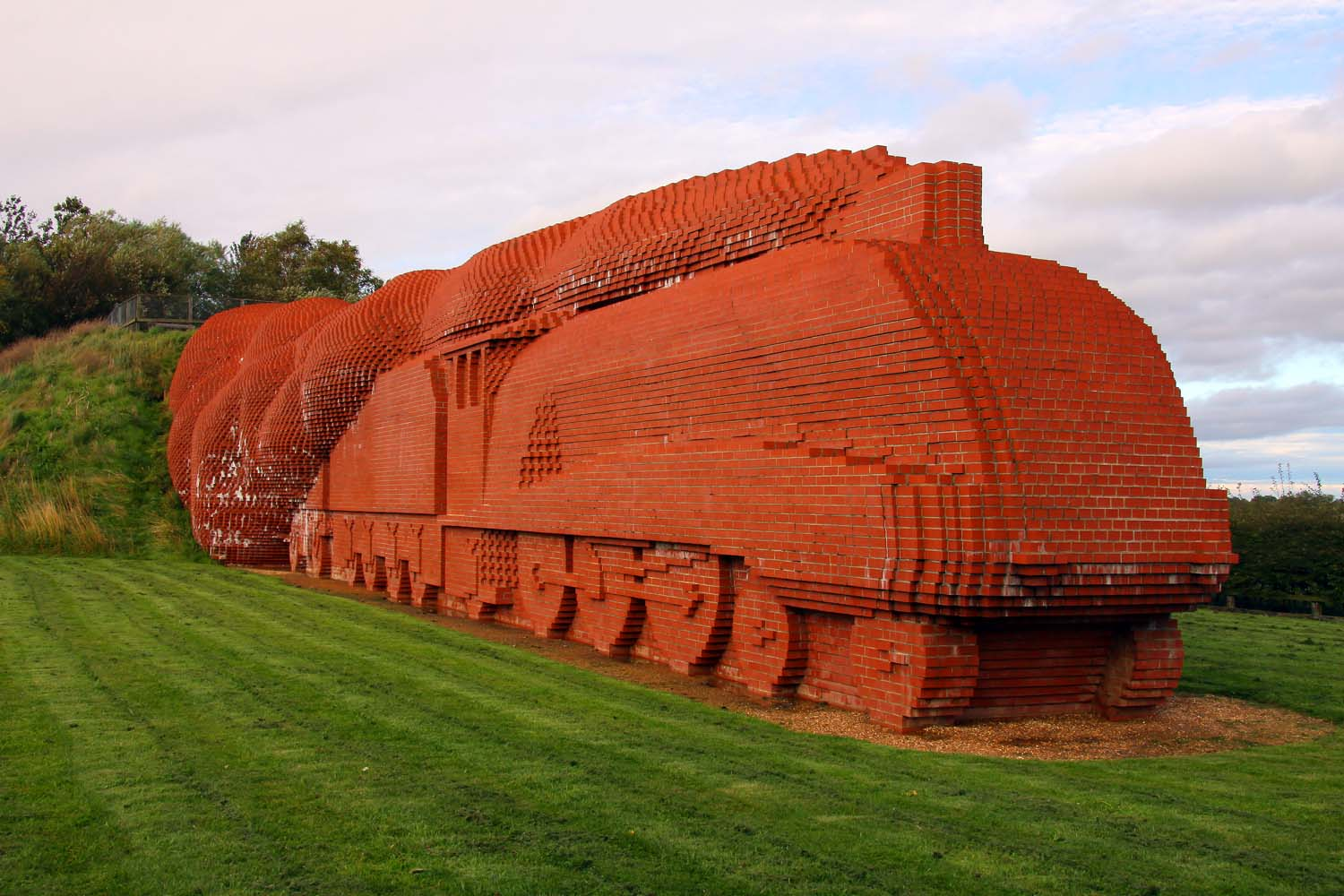

- Artist: David Mach
- Completion date: 1997
- Type: Sculpture
- Medium: Brick
- Subject: Steam locomotive
- Location: Darlington, County Durham, England; 54°31′24″N 1°29′53″W

The Brick Train is a brick sculpture located on the outskirts of the town of Darlington, in the English county of Durham. The sculpture was created by David Mach in 1997 to celebrate the town's railway heritage, and is modelled on the steam locomotive Mallard, which set a UK rail speed record of 126 miles per hour (203 km/h) in 1938. The locomotive is depicted as if just having exited a tunnel, with the billowing smoke typical of such an exit.

The sculpture is situated adjacent to Morrisons supermarket in the Morton Park shopping area to the east of Darlington town and in the civil parish of Morton Palms. A total of 185,000 Accrington Nori bricks were used in the sculpture's construction, and it is 7 metres (23 ft) high and 39.6 metres (130 ft) long, covering an area of 600 square metres (6,500 sq ft). It is hollow inside and special bricks provide gaps that enable bats to fly inside and roost. The sculpture is visible from the nearby A66 road, and was officially unveiled by Lord Palumbo of Walbrook on 23 June 1997.

The work cost £760,000, which was provided by the National Lottery Heritage Fund along with smaller contributions from Darlington Borough Council, Northern Arts and Morrisons.
