= Clough Head =

Mountain in the Lake District, England

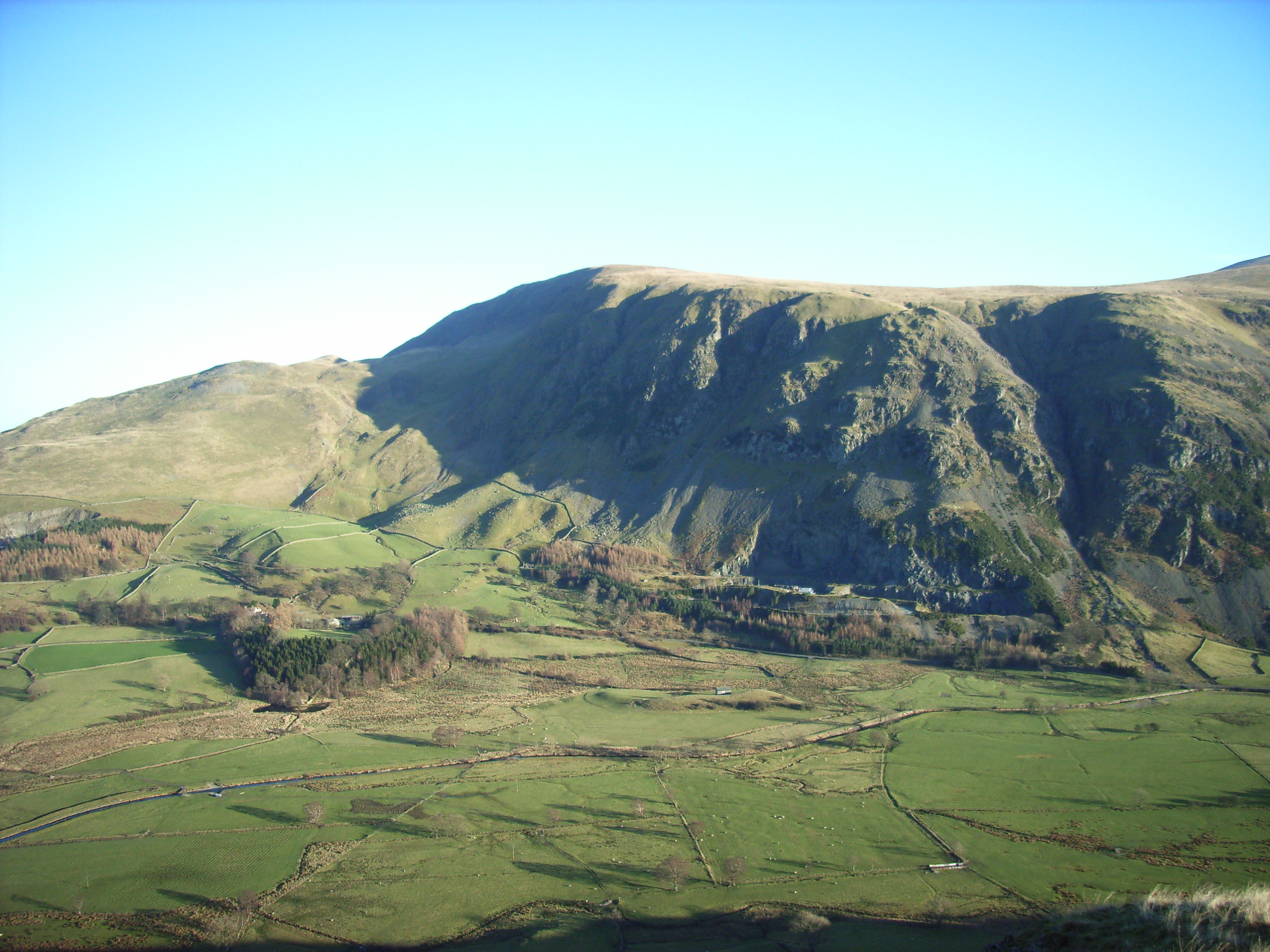
- Threlkeld Knotts (left) and Clough Head (centre) showing the craggy western side of the fell

Highest point
- Elevation: 726 m (2,382 ft)
- Prominence: 108 m (354 ft)
- Parent peak: Great Dodd
- Coordinates: 54°35′36″N 3°02′02″W

Geography
- Location within the Lake District
- Location: Cumbria, England
- Parent range: Lake District, Eastern Fells
- OS grid: NY333225
- Topo map: OS Landranger 90, Explorer OL5

Clough Head ( /klʌf hɛd/) (meaning: hill-top above the ravine) is a fell, or hill, in the English Lake District. It marks the northern end of the main ridge of the Helvellyn range and is often walked as part of the ridge walk. The fell stands south of the village of Threlkeld and the A66 road, and it forms the steep eastern side of the tranquil valley of St John's in the Vale.

On its western side the fell displays a dark mass of rocky crags and a deep-set rocky ravine. On the other side it has smooth grassy slopes. Beneath the north face is the steep valley or clough from which Clough Head gets its name. Also beneath the steep northern face lies the lower hill of Threlkeld Knotts, a granite hill which has been much quarried round its margin.

A number of different types of rock are found on and around Clough Head, which were formed in very different circumstances. These include deep-sea sedimentation, effusive volcanic lava flows, explosive volcanism, an intrusion of granite, mineralisation and finally glacial sculpting. To understand the geology of Clough Head is to understand much of the geology of the Lake District.

An old route known as the Old Coach Road passes beneath Clough Head. Most of the fell is Open Access land, which walkers can enter from either end of the Old Coach Road, or from a lane south of the village of Threlkeld. Four main routes lead to the summit.

== Topography ==
With a height of 726 m, Clough Head is the lowest summit of the Helvellyn range.

Gentle grass-covered slopes on the south and east sides of the fell drop to a broad col and to Mosedale, both of which separate Clough Head from Great Dodd, its neighbour to the south. To the north of the summit the ground drops abruptly down a steep scree-covered and craggy slope which marks the northern end of the Helvellyn range. This face is called Red Screes from the colour of the rock.

Beneath Red Screes is the lower, rounded, grassy hill of Threlkeld Knotts. This hill rises gently from the valley of the River Glenderamackin, which separates the Helvellyn range of fells from Blencathra and the northern Lakeland fells. A steep valley to the east of Threlkeld Knotts, which begins immediately below Red Screes, is the clough from which Clough Head is named. In the bottom of this valley there is a sheepfold known as Clough Fold.

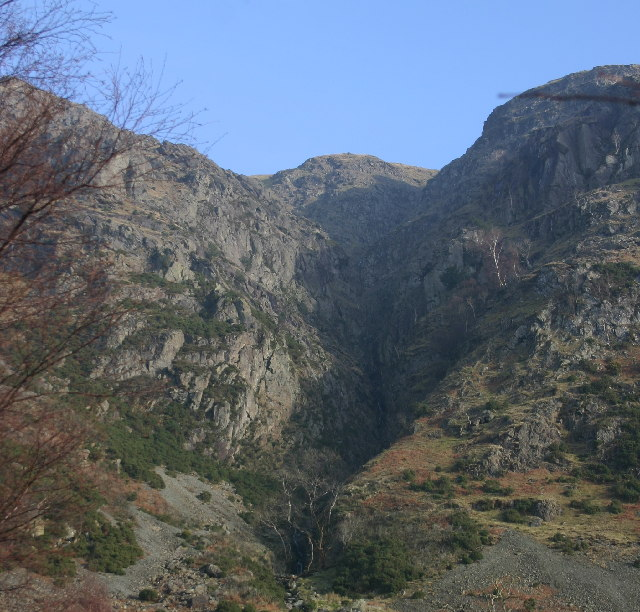
Sandbed Gill

Steep rocky crags guard the whole western side of the fell, rising abruptly from the green valley of St John's in the Vale. This western face of Clough Head, is steep, rough and rocky. The principal rock features are, from north to south: Buck Castle, Wanthwaite Crags and Bram Crag. South of Wanthwaite Crags is the very steep Fisher's Wife's Rake, a grassy break in the cliffs (though with scree) which allows determined fell-walkers to ascend the fell on this side. North of Bram Crag is a deep-seated rocky ravine called Sandbed Gill. This gill contains a considerable flow of water in its rocky gorge, but it often has only a dry bed by the time it gets down to valley level.

North-east of the summit of Clough Head is the lesser top of White Pike. From here the ridge descends and gradually broadens into the rough expanse of Thelkeld Common.

The western slopes of Clough Head drain into St John's Beck, which flows north into the River Greta, and which in turn joins the River Derwent at Keswick. The southern and eastern slopes drain into Mosedale and Mosedale Beck, which also joins the River Greta, via the River Glenderamackin.

Clough Head and its Subsidiary Tops
Name	Grid Reference	Height	Prominence	Classification (height and prominence)	Classification (authors’ listings)
Clough Head	NY 33394 22540	726 metres (2,382 feet)	108 metres (354 feet)	HuMP, Hewitt, Nuttall	Wainwright, Birkett
White Pike	NY 33900 22950	627 metres (2,057 feet)	6 metres (20 feet)		
Threlkeld Knotts	NY 33015 23023	514 metres (1,686 feet)	18 metres (59 feet)		Birkett

== Threlkeld Knotts ==
Threlkeld Knotts (meaning: the knobbly hill above Threlkeld) is a lower, rounded hill, nestling against and overshadowed by the steep northern face of Clough Head. Its curving summit ridge contains three small tops, each of which is marked by a cairn. From Threlkeld Knotts there is a striking view of Red Screes just above, and a narrow path slants up through the crags to the west shoulder of Clough Head.

On the northern slope of Threlkeld Knotts, not far above the large quarry, are the remains of an Iron Age settlement. The documented remains include seven hut circles, five enclosures, two trackways, a field system, and some fifty cairns which probably represent field clearances. Remains of enclosure walls may still be seen, about 200 metres (660 ft) north of the Old Coach Road.

== Old Coach Road ==
An old route, marked on maps as "Old Coach Road" crosses the northern slopes of Threlkeld Knotts and skirts the eastern side of Clough Head, reaching a height of 437 metres (1,434 ft) as it crosses from Wanthwaite ( /ˈwɒn.θɛt/) in St John's in the Vale to High Row near Dockray. This has suffered from rain water erosion in recent years, but remains a useful track for walkers. Near the summit of the road is Hause Well, a spring issuing from a crevice in the rock. The Ordnance Survey 1:25,000 map shows the road as an "other route with public access" and as a "traffic-free cycle route;" it does not show it as either a "byway" or a "restricted byway". However, official signs present on the gates at both ends of the road clearly show that access by motorised vehicles is permitted.

== Routes ==
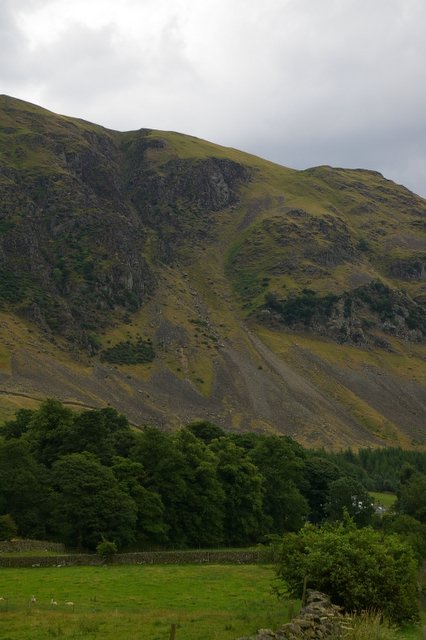
Fisher's Wife's Rake

The whole of Clough Head, Threlkeld Knotts and Threlkeld Common (above the intake wall which encloses the lower agricultural land and Threlkeld Quarry) is Open Access land. Entry to this land can be had from three points: from either end of the Old Coach Road, or from the lane leading to Newsham Farm. This lane begins opposite Threlkeld village, or it can be joined from the disused railway line alongside the road to the quarry.

Walkers may approach the summit by means of four principal routes. A narrow footpath leads from the Old Coach Road (at a point 250 metres (820 ft) east of Hause Well) to White Pike and then on to the summit.

Another narrow path leads from Threlkeld Knotts, slanting up through the crags and scree of Red Screes to emerge on the west shoulder of Clough Head. From there one may go up gentle grassy slopes to the summit, although the main path contours round to meet the track coming up from Great Dodd, which suggests that many ridge-walkers bypass the top (just as the ridge path bypasses nearly all the other tops of the range.)

From the south, the ridge track from Great Dodd leads straight up the long gentle slope to the top.

Finally, Fisher's Wife's Rake is a possible route up through the crags on the west side of Clough Head for energetic and determined walkers, but it is "very steep."

Climbers, or scramblers with some rock-climbing experience and a rope for the more difficult pitches, can ascend the hidden recesses of Sandbed Gill. Sandbed Gill was the first new route in the Lake District to be pioneered by the brothers George and Ashley Abraham in 1890. Although George was only 18 at the time, and Ashley 14, they had already gained true rock-climbing skills elsewhere in the Lakes. Walkers should leave the gill well alone.

Clough Head is often included as the first (or last) step of a traverse of the Helvellyn range. It may also be included in a longer version of the horseshoe walk around Deepdale which takes in the three "Dodds" to its south. This walk begins at High Row and takes advantage of the Old Coach Road.

== Summit ==
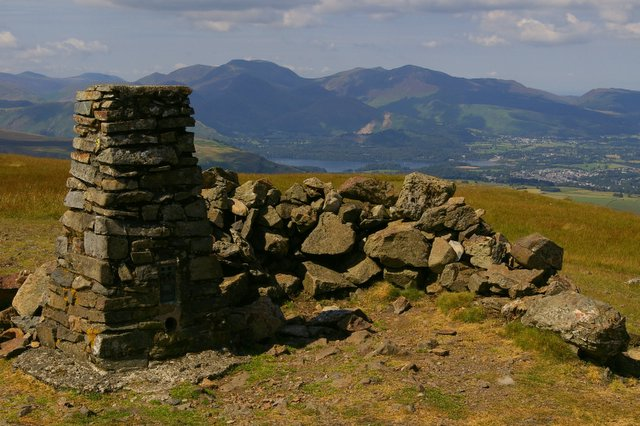
The summit of Clough Head and the view to the west

The summit is marked by an Ordnance Survey triangulation column and a wind shelter. It provides a good view of Blencathra to the north, and a wide, all-round view, broken only by Great Dodd, with glimpses of both the Solway Firth to the north and Morecambe Bay to the south. To the south-west the vista of the high fells is "especially striking".

Alfred Wainwright included a drawing of himself regarding Blencathra from this viewpoint in his Pictorial Guides to the Lakeland Fells. Mark Richards recommends White Pike as a better place for contemplating the view.

== Geology ==
The rocks of Clough Head belong to both the Skiddaw Group and the Borrowdale Volcanic Group, both of which date from the Ordovician period.

An east-west geological fault just north of the summit has brought these two rather different rock groups side by side. To the north, including White Pike, much of Threlkeld Common and the margins of Threlkeld Knotts are rocks of the Buttermere Formation, part of the Skiddaw Group. Mudstones, siltstones and sandstones which had been deposited in deep water on the northern margin of an ancient continent (Avalonia) in the early Ordovician Period were chaotically disrupted by a huge undersea avalanche to form an olistostrome deposit in which blocks of rock are now embedded in a matrix of mudstone, and intensely deformed by minor folds, slumps and shears. This event can be dated to about 460 million years ago.

The deep sea deposits of the Skiddaw Group were raised above sea level by the subduction of ocean crust from the north beneath the continent to the south. This uplift was followed by a brief (about 5 million years) period of intense volcanic activity, up to about 450 million years ago.

To the south of the fault on Clough Head are rocks of the Birker Fell Andesite Formation. These rocks are among the earliest of the volcanic rocks of the Borrowdale Volcanic Group, and are part of a thick succession of andesite sheets which now outcrop in a wide band around the western and northern sides of the Lake District. These sheets were formed by successive eruptions of mobile andesitic lava from shallow-sided volcanoes. The composition of the erupting magma varied from time to time, and the geological map shows an area of basaltic andesite along the crags on the western side of the fell, and areas of dacite higher on the fell. Individual lava flows may be separated by beds of volcaniclastic sandstone, that is, sedimentary deposits formed from the erosion of the volcanic rocks and deposited by streams, floods and possibly wind. The geological map shows a number of areas of volcaniclastic sandstone on the crags on the west side, as well as a larger area surrounding the summit, into which an andesite sill was intruded.

After the eruptions of the Birker Fell Formation, the composition of the erupting magma changed from largely andesitic to predominantly dacitic, and as a result the nature of the volcanism became more explosive.

In the area to the north of Sticks Pass the Birker Fell andesites are overlain by the Lincomb Tarns Tuff Formation. This formation is one of the most widespread of the volcanic rocks of the Lake District; it seems that the whole district was buried beneath at least 150 m of densely welded ignimbrite, a rock formed from a pyroclastic flow of very hot gas and rock. This formation must represent a series of eruptions of truly exceptional magnitude, accompanying the formation of a volcanic caldera probably in the area around what is now Helvellyn.

On Clough Head a small sheet of the Thirlmere Tuff Member covers the summit of the fell, a member of the Lincomb Tarns Formation. This rock is a rhyolitic lapilli tuff in which the individual pieces of semi-molten lava were flattened under the weight of deposits above them.

Towards the end of, or after the cessation of the volcanic activity a large granite batholith was emplaced in stages beneath the volcanic rocks of the Lake District. Threlkeld Knotts consists largely of an intrusion of micro-granite, known as the Threlkeld Intrusion, a part of the larger batholith. The granite was intruded into rocks of the Skiddaw Group and the base of the Borrowdale Volcanic Group. Uranium-lead dating has established an age of 451±1.1 million years for this intrusion.

Seven quarries around the western side of Threlkeld Knotts have worked the microgranite. In addition to the large Threlkeld Quarry there are smaller workings at Birkett Bank, Hilltop Quarries and Bramcrag Quarry. Threlkeld Quarry was opened in 1870 to supply railway ballast for the Crewe to Carlisle railway line. Production increased in the 1890s with material for Thirlmere Reservoir and for roadstone. The quarry closed in the 1980s and now houses the Threlkeld Quarry and Mining Museum.

Mineral veins have been formed in many Lake District rocks by hydrothermal circulation of groundwater though geological faults and are often associated with the granite batholith. Veins containing lead and copper ores were found on Wanthwaite Crag where there are several old mineral workings, some very old. The most recent lease was taken out in 1887 by the short-lived and unsuccessful Wanthwaite Crag Mining Company.

The lower promontory of Threlkeld Knotts north of Clough Head is scarred and flanked by 'rock slope failure' fractures and landslips, and views from the A66 and Blencathra could suggest that the whole mass of the Knotts has descended from the concavity in the north face, which is not a true glacial cirque (Lakeland combe), but this remains debatable. Rock slope failure also patterns White Pike with antiscarps (uphill-facing scarplets), which could formerly have extended across the Clough Head cavity.

== Names ==
Clough Head was called Threlkeld Fell in Thomas West's 1778 guide book. Its present name, Clough Head, was first recorded by the Ordnance Survey in 1867. Clough is a dialect word from the Old English clōh, a ravine. This appears to be a reference to a steep valley just below Red Screes, and which contains a sheepfold called Clough Fold. Thus Clough Head is "the hill-top above the ravine."

White Pike is "the pale summit," recorded since 1774, probably named from its pale-coloured rock, and perhaps in contrast to the reddish colour of Red Screes beneath the main summit.

Threlkeld Knotts was first recorded by the Ordnance Survey in 1900. Knott is a dialect word from the Old Norse knǫttr, 'ball, hard round mass' used of compact or craggy hills. Hence Threlkeld Knotts is "the knobbly hill above Threlkeld", a place-name recorded from as early as 1197 and meaning "the slaves' spring" from the Old Norse þræla, 'thrall, slave,' and Old Norse kelda, 'a spring.' 'Thrall' may have been the word used by the Norse settlers to refer to the native Britons.

Fisher's Wife's Rake is "Mrs Fisher's Path." Rake is a dialect word of unknown origin which refers to a narrow path on a hill. Mark Richards claims that the name comes from the Fisher family of Rake How across the valley. He says the husband cut peat on the col above and his wife hauled it down by sled, but he gives no indication of the source of this information.

== Notes and references ==
Notes

References

- List of hills in the Lake District
- List of fells in the Lake District
