= Morton Palms =

Civil parish in County Durham, England

Coordinates: 54.523199°N 1.4900100°W

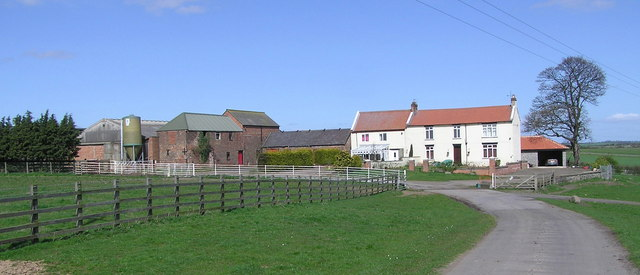
- Morton Palms Farm

- Location within County Durham
- Area: 5.50 km^{2} (2.12 sq mi)
- Population: 32 (2001 census)
  - Density: 6/km^{2} (16/sq mi)
- Civil parish: Morton Palms
- Unitary authority: Darlington
- Ceremonial county: Durham
- Region: North East
- Country: England
- Sovereign state: United Kingdom
- Police: Durham
- Fire: County Durham and Darlington
- Ambulance: North East

Morton Palms is a civil parish in the Darlington district, in the ceremonial county of Durham, England. In 2001 the parish had a population of 32. The parish borders Barmpton, Great Burdon, Hurworth, Middleton St. George, Neasham and Sadberge.

== Landmarks ==
There are five listed buildings in Morton Palms. Brick Train, a brick sculpture is in the parish.

== History ==
The name "Morton" means 'Moor farm/settlement', it was held by Bryan Palms in the 16th century. The site of the deserted medieval village of Morton Palms is marked by the current farm buildings. Formerly a township in the parish of Haughton-le-Skerne, Morton Palms became a civil parish in its own right in 1866.

=== Tees Valley Metro ===
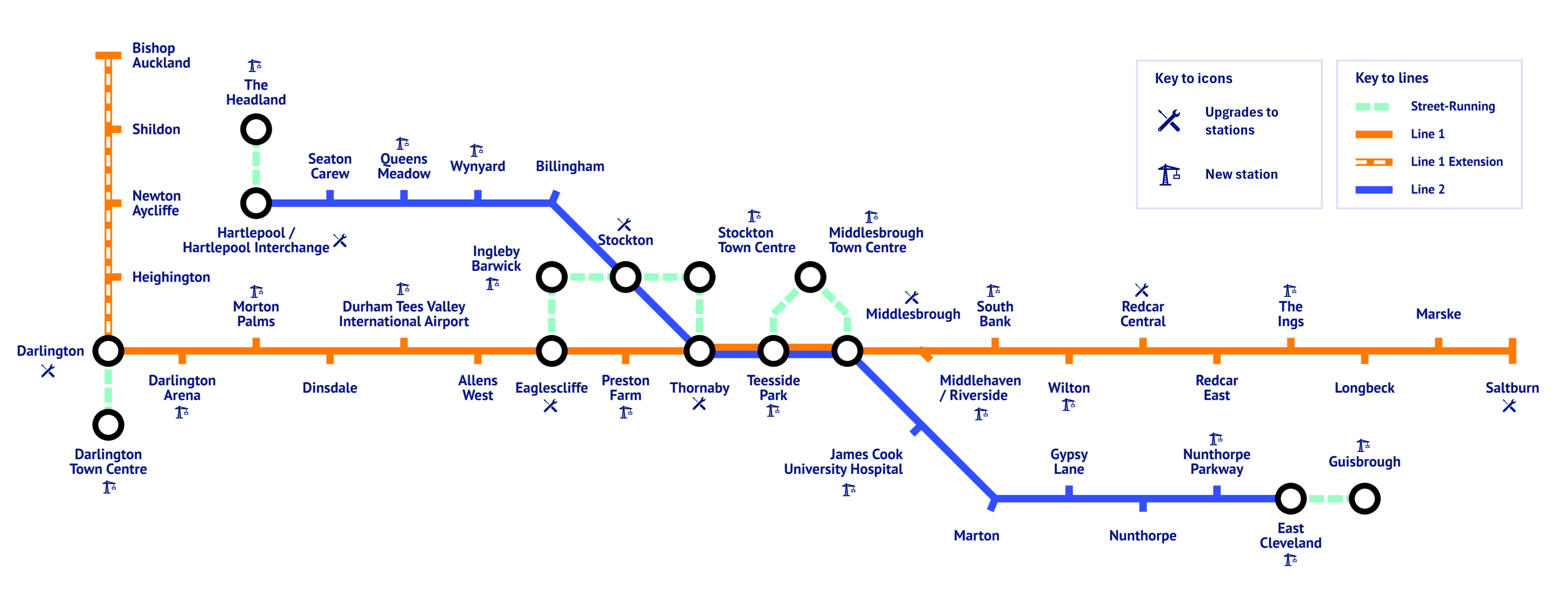
Transit diagram showcasing all discussed or mentioned ideas for the Tees Valley Metro.

Starting in 2006, Morton Palms was mentioned within the Tees Valley Metro scheme as a possible new station. This was a plan to upgrade the Tees Valley Line and sections of the Esk Valley Line and Durham Coast Line to provide a faster and more frequent service across the North East of England. In the initial phases the services would have been heavy rail mostly along existing alignments with new additional infrastructure and rollingstock. The later phase would have introduced tram-trains to allow street running and further heavy rail extensions.

As part of the scheme, Morton Palms station would have received rail services to Darlington and Saltburn (1–2 to 4 trains per hour) and the Tees Valley line would have received new rollingstock.

However, due to a change in government in 2010 and the 2008 financial crisis, the project was ultimately shelved. Several stations eventually got their improvements.
