= Duddon Bridge =

Hamlet in Cumbria, England

Coordinates: 54.282°N 3.231°W

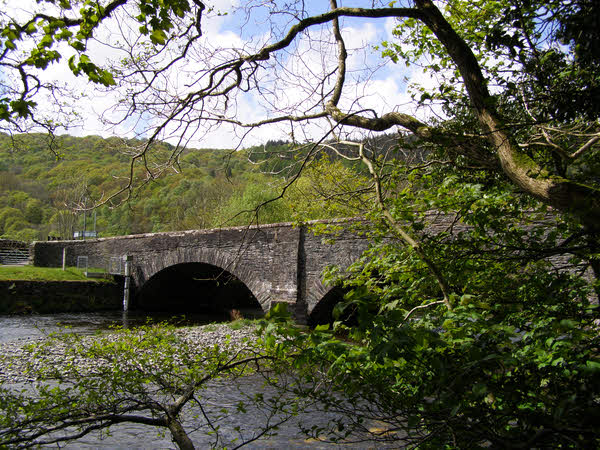
- Duddon Bridge

- Location in South Lakeland Location within Cumbria
- OS grid reference: SD198880
- Civil parish: Millom Without; Broughton West
- Unitary authority: Cumberland; Westmorland and Furness
- Ceremonial county: Cumbria
- Region: North West
- Country: England
- Sovereign state: United Kingdom
- Post town: MILLOM
- Postcode district: LA18
- Post town: BROUGHTON-IN-FURNESS
- Postcode district: LA20
- Dialling code: 01229
- Police: Cumbria
- Fire: Cumbria
- Ambulance: North West
- UK Parliament: Barrow and Furness

Duddon Bridge is a hamlet in Cumbria, England.
