= Low Rigg =

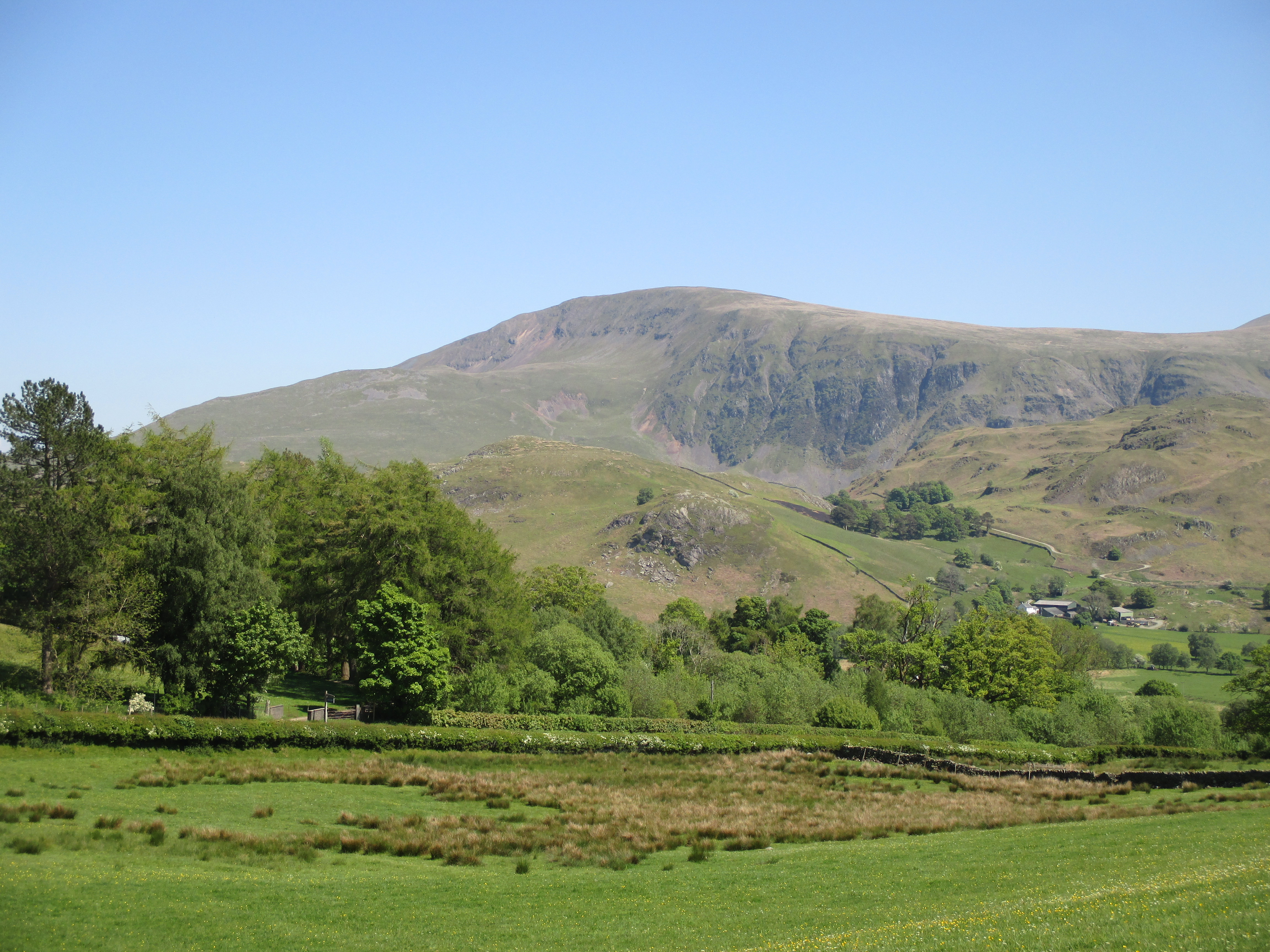
- A view of Low Rigg from the west, with Skelthwaite Crag in front of it.

Highest point
- Elevation: c.277 m
- Prominence: c.55 m
- Parent peak: High Rigg

Geography
- Location: Lake District, England

Low Rigg is a small hill in the English Lake District a few miles east of the town of Keswick and slightly north of its larger neighbour High Rigg.

Geologically, Low Rigg is a lens-shaped laccolith consisting of an intrusion of a fine-grained granite.
