= David Mach =

Scottish sculptor and installation artist

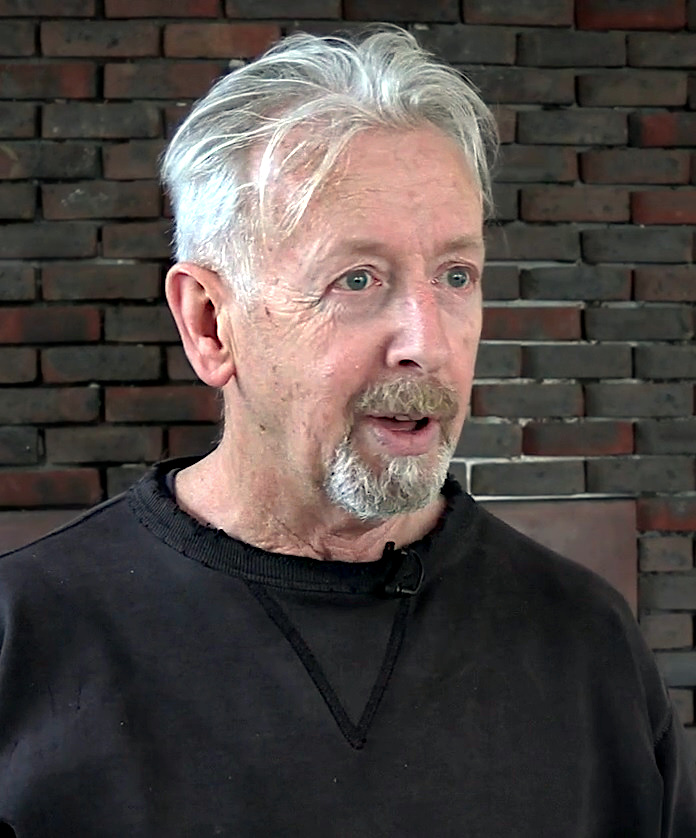
David Mach - Heavy Metal at Pangolin, London, 2023

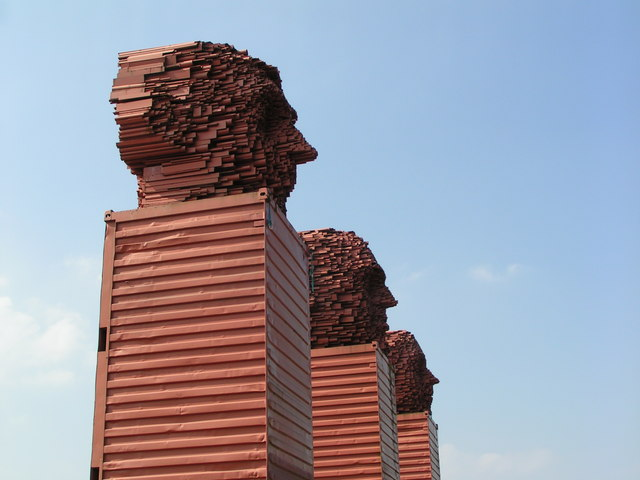
Big Heids, Lanarkshire, a tribute to the steel industry

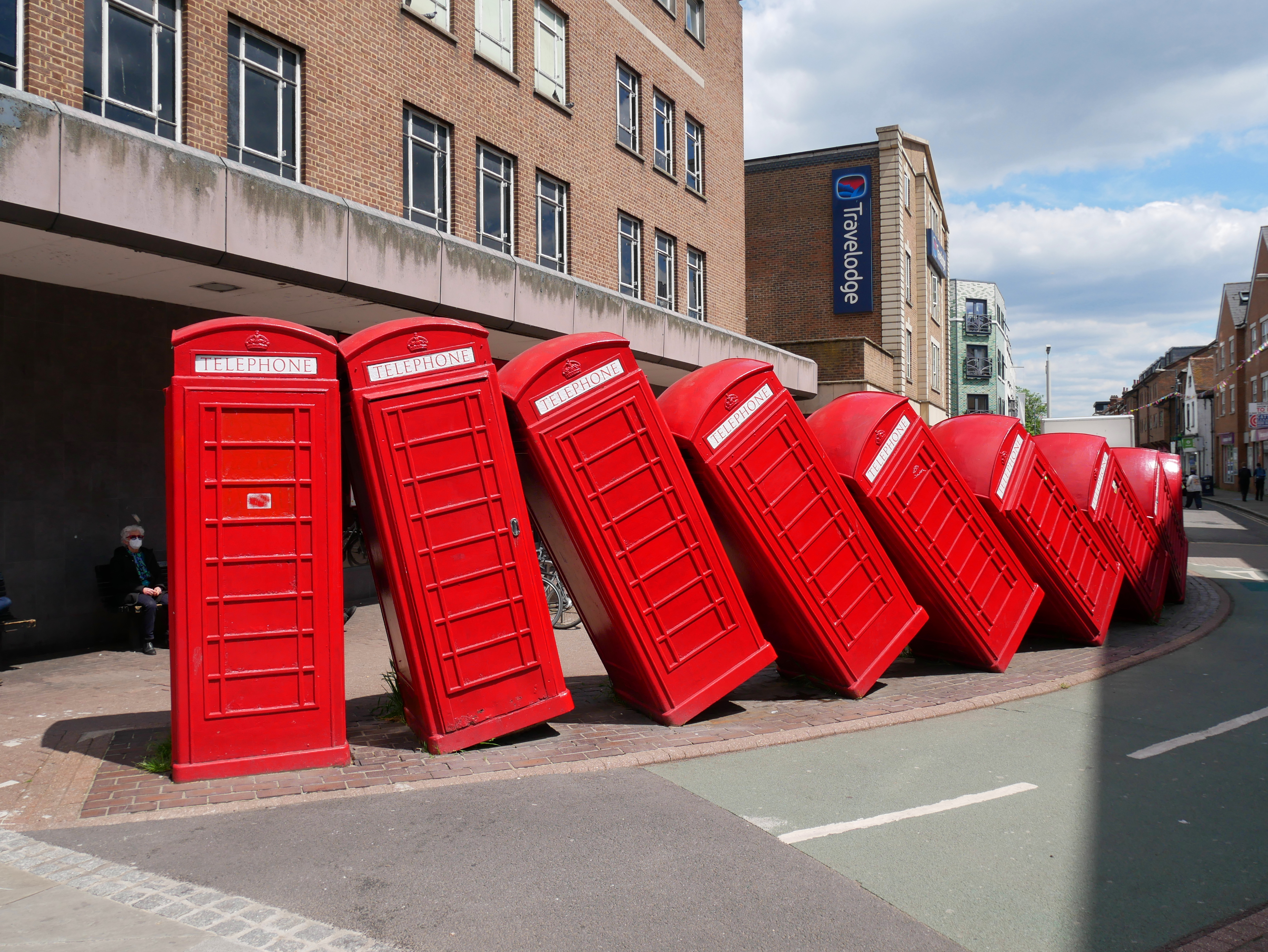
Out of Order (1989)

David Mach RA (born 18 March 1956) is a Scottish sculptor and installation artist. His artistic style is based on flowing assemblages of mass-produced objects. Typically these include magazines, vicious teddy bears, newspapers, car tyres, match sticks and coat hangers. Many of his installations are temporary and constructed in public spaces.

== Early life ==
Mach was born in 1956 in Methil, Fife. Mach studied at Duncan of Jordanstone College of Art and Design (now a school of University of Dundee), Dundee, Scotland from 1974, graduating in 1979, then at the Royal College of Art, London between 1979 and 1982. Following several shows and public installations, Mach was nominated for the Turner Prize in 1988. Mach was elected Member of the Royal Academy of Arts in 1998, and was appointed Professor of Sculpture in 2000.

== Work ==
One example of his early magazine pieces, Adding Fuel to the Fire, was an installation assembled from an old truck and several cars surrounded and subsumed by about 100 tons of magazines, individually arranged to create the impression that the vehicles were being caught in an explosion of flames and billowing smoke.

An early influential sculpture was Polaris in 1983, exhibited outside the Royal Festival Hall, South Bank Centre, London. This consisted of some 6,000 car tyres arranged as a life size replica of a Polaris submarine. Mach intended it as a protest against the nuclear arms race meant to stir controversy. A member of the public, James Gore-Graham from West Kensington, who took exception to the piece tried to burn it down; unfortunately, he got caught in the flames himself and suffered 90% burns from the explosion and died three days later.

In the early 1980s Mach started to produce some smaller-scale works assembled out of unstruck match sticks. These mostly took the form of human or animalistic heads and masks, like Elvis, with the coloured tips of the match heads arranged to construct the patterned surface of the face. After accidentally setting fire to one of these heads, Mach now often ignites his match pieces as a form of performance art. He constructed Gorilla from coat-hangers.

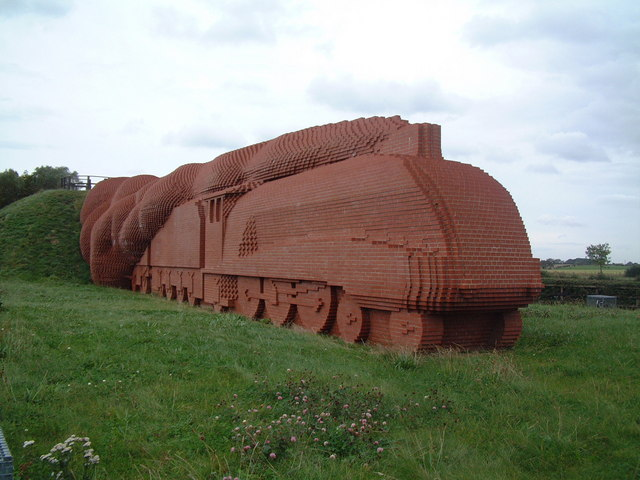
Brick Train near Darlington

In 1997, Mach produced some larger-scale permanent public works such as Out of Order in Kingston upon Thames, the Brick Train (a depiction of an LNER Class A4 4468 Mallard steam engine which held the speed record of 126mph in 1934), made from 185,000 bricks, which can be seen near Morrison's supermarket on the A66 just outside Darlington. and the Big Heids visible from the M8 between Glasgow and Edinburgh.

During this period, Mach’s work was featured in several joint exhibitions with international artists. These included Framed, with Dutch visual artist Harald Vlugt at Galerie de la Tour in Amsterdam in the Spring of 1996, and “Passage” International Art Encounters: Project No. 2, a joint exhibition with Israeli artist Zadok Ben-David at the Chelouche Gallery for Contemporary Art in Tel Aviv in June 1997.

A second strand to Mach's work are his collage pieces. Partly as a result of having access to thousands of reproduced images in the magazines left over from many of his installations, Mach began to experiment with producing collages. In 1999, he produced a mixed-media postcard and photo-collage of Sir Richard Branson, measuring 1.824 x 1.826 metres. he did a National Portrait, of 3 x 70 metres collage for the Millennium Dome that featured many images of British people at work and at play.

In 2011, he joined forces with the Museum of Edinburgh, to produce an explosive display celebrating the 400th anniversary of the King James Bible.

== Awards and honours ==
- 1988 Mach was nominated for the Turner Prize at the Tate Gallery, London.
- 1992 Winner of the Lord Provost's Prize for Services to the Visual Arts in Glasgow.
