= Legburthwaite =

Village in Cumbria, England

Coordinates: 54.561°N 3.055°W

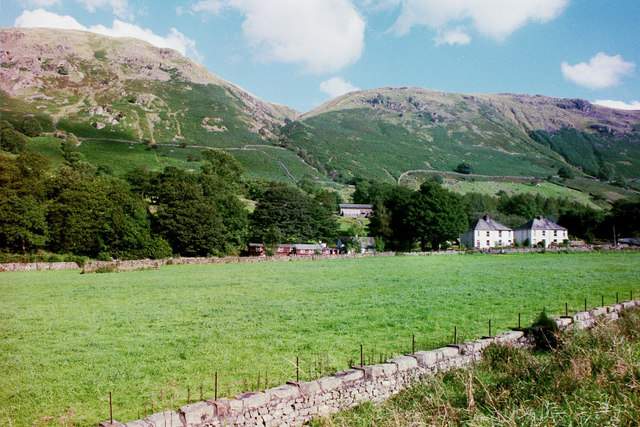
- Legburthwaite

- Location in Allerdale, Cumbria Location within Cumbria
- OS grid reference: NY317189
- Civil parish: St John's Castlerigg and Wythburn
- Unitary authority: Cumberland
- Ceremonial county: Cumbria
- Region: North West
- Country: England
- Sovereign state: United Kingdom
- Post town: KESWICK
- Postcode district: CA12
- Dialling code: 017687
- Police: Cumbria
- Fire: Cumbria
- Ambulance: North West
- UK Parliament: Penrith and Solway

Legburthwaite is a village in the Cumberland district, in the county of Cumbria. It is located on the A591 road and the B5322 road. Legburthwaite has a disused place of worship and formerly, a youth hostel. It is just north of Thirlmere.
