= St John's Church, St John's in the Vale =

Coordinates: 54.5925°N 3.0748°W

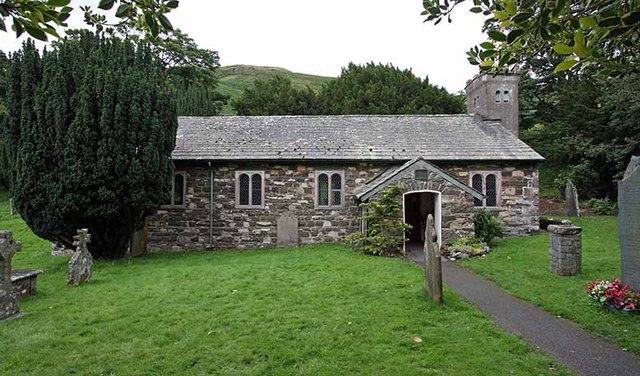
- St John's Church, St John's in the Vale, from the north

- Location in Cumbria
- OS grid reference: NY 307 225
- Location: St John's in the Vale, Cumbria
- Country: England
- Denomination: Anglican
- Churchmanship: Central churchmanship
- Website: St John's in the Vale

History
- Status: Parish church

Architecture
- Functional status: Active
- Heritage designation: Grade II
- Designated: 3 March 1967
- Architect: Paley, Austin and Paley (reordering)
- Architectural type: Church
- Completed: 1845

Specifications
- Materials: Slate and igneous rock, with galleting, Slate roof

Administration
- Province: York
- Diocese: Carlisle
- Archdeaconry: West Cumberland
- Deanery: Derwent
- Parish: St. John's in the Vale and Wyburn

Clergy
- Priest: Revd Charles Hope

St John's Church is in the valley of St John's in the Vale, Cumbria, England. It is an active Anglican parish church in the deanery of Derwent, the archdeaconry of West Cumberland, and the diocese of Carlisle. Its benefice is united with those of St Mary, Threlkeld, and Wythburn Church. The church is recorded in the National Heritage List for England as a designated Grade II listed building.

== History ==
The church was built in 1845, replacing an earlier church, and re-using some of its fabric. The interior was reordered in 1893 by the Lancaster firm of architects, Paley, Austin and Paley. Some of the fittings currently present in the church result from this reordering.

== Architecture ==
St John's is constructed in slate and igneous rock, with some galleting. It is roofed with green slate. The plan is simple, consisting of a six-bay nave and chancel in one range, a small west tower, and a north porch. The windows along the sides of the church have two lights, and the east window has three lights. The tower has twin bell openings, and a battlemented parapet.

Inside the church is an open timber roof. The altar was designed by George Gilbert Scott, and was moved here from Crosthwaite Parish Church in 1848. Panelling in the church, formerly from box pews in Crosthwaite Church, was moved here in 1893. The pulpit, its sounding board, and the sanctuary rails date from the 18th century, and also came from another church. Also in the church are carved Royal arms of George III, and memorial tablets dated 1774 and 1853. The stained glass in the east window dates from 1895 and was made by Shrigley and Hunt.

== See also ==
- List of works by Paley, Austin and Paley
