= A591 road =

Road in Cumbria, England

A591

Route information
- Length: 43 mi (69 km)

Major junctions
- North end: Bothel
- A595; A66 A5271 A593 A5075 A592 A5074 A5284; A6 A590
- South end: Sedgwick

Location
- Country: United Kingdom
- Primary destinations: Keswick; Grasmere; Ambleside; Windermere; Kendal

Road network
- Roads in the United Kingdom; Motorways; A and B road zones

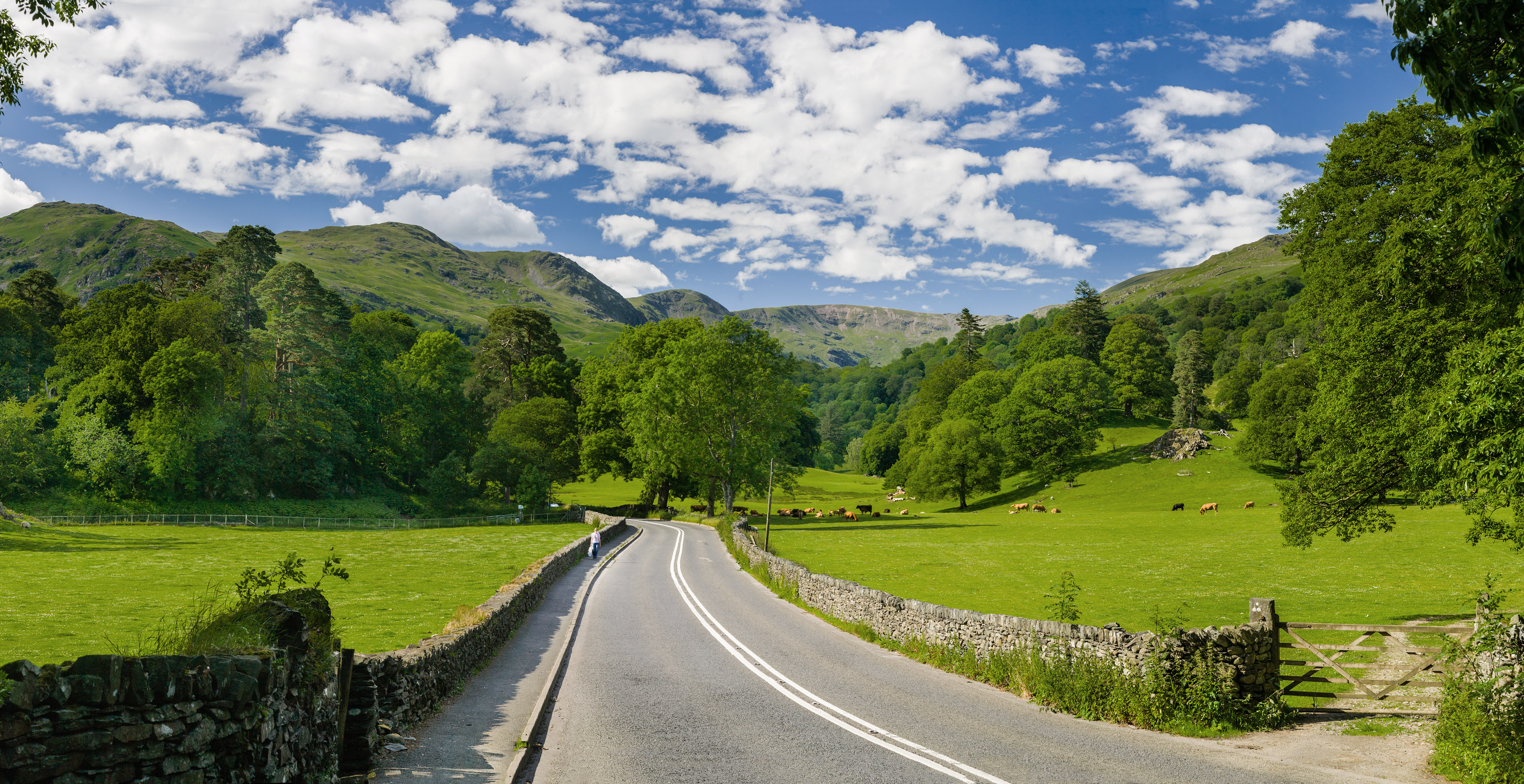
The A591 as it passes between Ambleside and Grasmere

The A591 is a major road in Cumbria, which lies almost entirely within the Lake District national park. A 2009 poll by satellite navigation firm Garmin named the stretch of the road between Windermere and Keswick as the most popular road in Britain. The 29.8 mile stretch between Kendal and Keswick was also named the UK's best driving road, according to a specially devised driving ratio formulated by car rental firm Avis.

== Route ==
The road begins (at its southern end) 3.5 miles (5.6 km) north-west of junction 36 of the M6 motorway at Brettargh Holt roundabout with the A590 road (54.2746°N 2.7605°W), close to Sizergh Castle. It bypasses the town of Kendal as a dual carriageway, this £1.9m 3-mile (4.8 km) section opened on 29 August 1971. It becomes a busy single carriageway road as it enters the Lake District. It bypasses the town of Windermere, closely following the north-eastern bank of Windermere. It then travels through the centre of Ambleside, follows the northern side of Rydal Water, passes White Moss Common, follows the eastern edge of Grasmere and passes the village of Grasmere. The road continues over Dunmail Raise and along the eastern edge of Thirlmere. Shortly afterwards it reaches the town of Keswick. It meets the A66 road at a grade-separated junction. Traffic then bypasses Keswick by following the A66 west for 2.2 km to a roundabout where the A591 resumes, continuing in a roughly north-westerly direction, with fine views over Bassenthwaite Lake. The road terminates at the village of Bothel, on the A595 road (54.7357°N 3.2733°W). The Bothel to Keswick section has many acute bends and is particularly narrow in places, so care is needed when driving on it.

=== Storm damage and closure ===
The road was badly damaged during Storm Desmond on 5 December 2015 including a part washed away at Dunmail Raise and landslip adjacent to Thirlmere. The closed section of road between Grasmere and Legburthwaite reopened on 11 May 2016. While the road was closed a new tarmac path for walkers, cyclists, and horseriders was built to the west of the road at Dunmail Raise.
