= The Denes =

Area of Darlington, County Durham, England

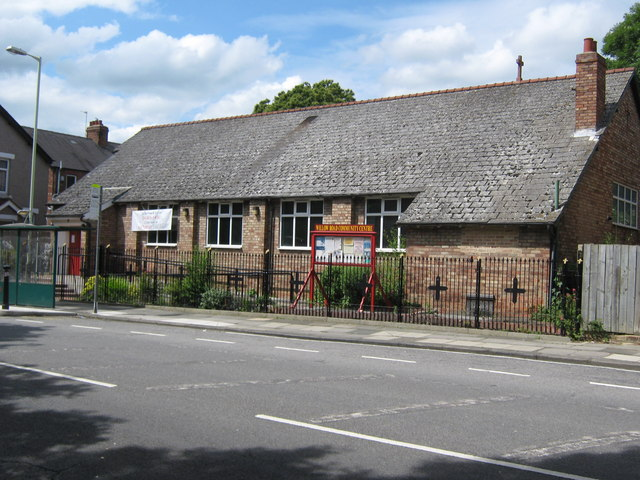
The community centre on Willow Road

The Denes is a centrally located area of Darlington in the borough of Darlington, County Durham, England. It consists mainly of semi-detached and 1900s terraced housing, surrounding valley areas of wooded public park and Cocker beck.

The area runs parallel to and between Woodland Road to the south and Brinkburn Road to the north from Cockerton to High Northgate. At the easterly end the southerly border is often judged around Corporation Road, by local estate agent descriptions. The area is close to Faverdale and Mowden.

== Geography ==
The Denes is one of the most heavily populated areas of the Darlington Borough due to the close proximity of 1900s terraced streets, 1930s semis and new build housing.

The Denes has pleasant surroundings due to the wooded/beck area which runs from Hopetown lane (to the east) and West Auckland Road (to the west).

== Parks ==
There are six parks in this area which are called 'The Denes', sometimes known locally as the following:-

- Tennis Dene - adjacent to Deneside Road up to Pierremont Road (containing 2 tennis courts and 1 basketball court), with entrances on Woodland Road (2, one next to Dene Grove and one next to Tandridge Court), Westlands Road (2, located in close proximity but serving different directions), Deneside Road (bottom of Banklands Road), Pierremont Road (2 on either side of the beck) and one each on Bracken Road and Dene Grove.

The 'Sheddy' Dene as seen from the Hollyhurst Road entrance - March 2013

- Sheddy Dene - between Pierremont Road and Hollyhurst Road, (apparently named after a Swiss cottage type structure previously there in the 1920s, however locals may also be referring to building at the top of the bank near Pierremont Road known as 'The Shed)
- Play Dene - between Hollyhurst Road and Surtees Street. Previously known as swingy dene due to the former presence of swings.
- Bowling Dene - between Surtees Street and Bartlett Street. (a bowling green was and still is in this dene)
- Football Dene - between Bartlett Street and Widdowfield Street. (as it is flat and perfect for football), but also unofficially known to some as the Doggy Dene because of the lack of footways making it ideal for dog walkers)
- Paddley Dene - between Widdowfield Street and Westbrook (so called as it once had a Paddling Pool), but also unofficially known to some as the Bumpy Slide Dene, owing to the uneven slide that was once featured in its play area).

== History ==
The new children's play area funded by the National Lottery - taken in March 2013.

In April 2010, The Parks for People programme which is funded by the Heritage Lottery Fund and the Big Lottery Fund agreed to award a grant of £878,500 to Darlington Borough Council to fund the restoration of the Denes.

The restoration work was focused on the following elements:

- Replacing the existing footbridges.
- Improving all the entrances with new artistic archways and paving.
- Street lighting in three of the Denes to light popular cross routes.
- Planting and other works to improve the biodiversity.
- Pond construction in the Paddly Dene.
- Replacement of all the seating and bins, plus new notice boards and signage.
