= Walworth (disambiguation) =

Walworth is a district of London, England

Walworth or Wallworth may also refer to:

== Places ==
United Kingdom

- Walworth (London County Council constituency)
- Walworth (UK Parliament constituency)
- Walworth, County Durham, England

United States

- Walworth County, South Dakota
- Walworth County, Wisconsin
- Walworth, Nebraska
- Walworth, New York
- Walworth, Wisconsin, a village
- Walworth (town), Wisconsin, a town

== People ==
- Lynette Wallworth, Australian artist and filmmaker
- T. J. Wallworth, acting secretary of Manchester United in 1912
- Ellen Hardin Walworth (1832-1915), American lawyer and activist
- Jeannette Walworth (1835–1918), American novelist, journalist
- Reuben H. Walworth (1788-1867), American lawyer and politician
- Ruby Walworth (1867–1898), American nurse, poet, and suffragist
- William Walworth (died 1385), Lord Mayor of London

== See also ==
- Wallworth Lake and Wallworth Park, in Haddonfield, New Jersey, U.S.
  - Walworth Gate, a hamlet in the parish of Walworth, County Durham
- Low Walworth, a hamlet in the parish of Walworth, County Durham
