= Walworth Castle =

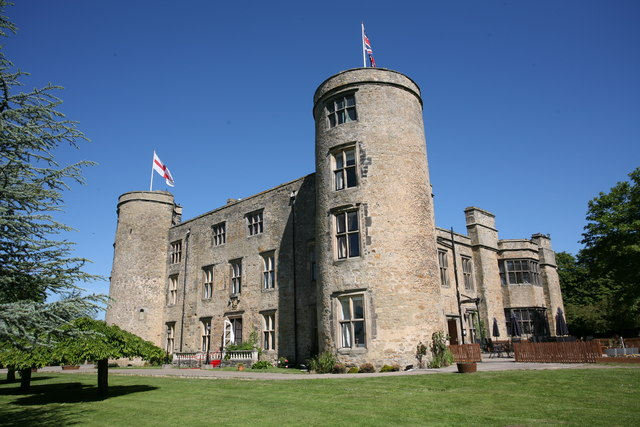
- South−east corner of Walworth Castle

- Location within County Durham

General information
- Type: Manor house
- Architectural style: Tudor style architecture
- Location: Walworth; County Durham, England
- Coordinates: 54.565°N 1.639°W
- Elevation: 300 feet (91 m)
- Construction started: c. 1579
- Completed: c. 1600
- Renovated: 1740; 1864; 1991; 2000; 2016
- Client: Thomas Jennison

Technical details
- Structural system: Limestone rubble and Welsh slate

Design and construction
- Architect: Thomas Holt

Walworth Castle is a castle of 12th-century origins, situated at Walworth, near Darlington, County Durham, England. It is a Grade I listed building. It was completed around 1600, probably by Thomas Holt for Thomas Jenison. It stands on the site of a former manor house or castle built in the 12th century by the Hansard family. The estate passed through the hands of the Ayscoughs and Aylmers besides the Hansards and Jenisons, and became a prisoner-of-war camp during World War II and then a girls' boarding school after the war. It has been a hotel since 1981.

== History ==
=== Hansard and Ayscough families ===
The present manor house stands on the site of a previous manor house or castle which was built around 1150 by the Hansard family. There is no evidence that the building was ever used for defence. The title to the castle fell into the hands of the House of Neville after the 1349 Black Death, but was reclaimed by Robert Hansard in 1391. The castle then passed to Sir Richard Hansard in 1395, his son Richard in 1454, his grandson Richard in 1466, Sir William Hansard in 1508, Sir William's short−lived son William in 1521, and to William Jr.'s infant daughter Elizabeth Hansard in 1521. In 1539 Elizabeth married Sir Francis Ayscough, so the castle passed to the Ayscough family. In 1563 the castle passed to her son William Ayscough, but because there were no further heirs the castle was sold.

=== Jenison family ===
In about 1579 Thomas Jennison, Auditor General of Ireland (d.1579), purchased from the Ascough family the manor of High Walworth. The manor included a manor house or medieval castle on this site; he demolished most of it apart from the medieval south−west tower and built the present castle, whose fabric is still identifiable as 16th century in date. It is thought that Jennison's architect was probably Thomas Holt. In 1586 Jenison died, and his widow Elizabeth née Birch inherited the castle. It was during her ownership that King James VI of Scotland stayed here on 14 May 1603 while travelling to his coronation as king of England. It is said that the king knighted her son−in−law George Freville in return for bountiful entertainment at the castle. In 1605 Elizabeth Jenison died and her son William Jenison inherited the castle. It became dilapidated because he did not live there, because he was in debt and because in 1610 and 1612 he was imprisoned for being Roman Catholic. The Jennisons were a strongly Catholic family. In 1679 Francis Jennison sold the estate and emigrated to Europe, possibly because in 1678 Thomas Jenison was accused of involvement in the Popish Plot to assassinate Charles II, arrested by Titus Oates and thrown into Newgate Prison. In 1681 the castle was divided from the rest of the estate and awarded by Chancery to Robert Jenison. In 1687 the castle was reunited with its estate when Ralph Jenison bought the whole estate for £6,205. The castle was searched for arms in 1689 in response to suspicions of a potential rebellion against the Protestants William III and Mary II. Ralph Jenison inherited the castle at the age of 10 years in 1704. He later renovated the castle at great expense, and died in debt, so that the castle was again sold.

=== Stephenson, Harrison, Aylmer and Eade families ===
The castle was sold for £16,000 in 1759 to wine merchant Matthew Stephenson, and then to Newcastle merchant John Harrison in 1775. His daughter Anne (1778–1857) married in 1807 Arthur Aylmer (1772–1831, the youngest son of Sir FitzGerald Aylmer, 6th Bt.), British Army officer of the 68th Regiment of Foot, later promoted to Lieutenant-General; the castle passed to the Aylmer family in 1819 at the death of John Harrison. After General Aylmer was buried in Heighington in 1831, John Harrison Aylmer inherited the castle. He repaired the roof and replaced previous soldier statues on the towers with pillars topped with balls, to look like the statues. However, in 1868 he, his wife and eldest son were killed in the Abergele rail disaster. His sons Vivian and Edmund, aged 12 and 9 respectively, inherited the castle. Vivian became High Sheriff of Durham and a big game hunter who explored Somaliland and crossed the Horn of Africa in 1885. He died in 1931, and he and his brother were buried at St Philip's Church in Caerdeon, North Wales. The castle was then sold to General Aylmer's descendants Neville and Charles Eade. In World War II, during the Eades' ownership, the castle was used as a prisoner-of-war camp for 200 men including German and Italian officers, under the command of Major Rollin Holmes. In 1950 Durham County Council bought the castle and it became a girls' boarding school.

=== Hotel ownership ===
In 1981 the Council sold the castle, they renovated it and then it was opened as a hotel. It is currently part of the Best Western hotels group in the UK.

=== Castle building ===
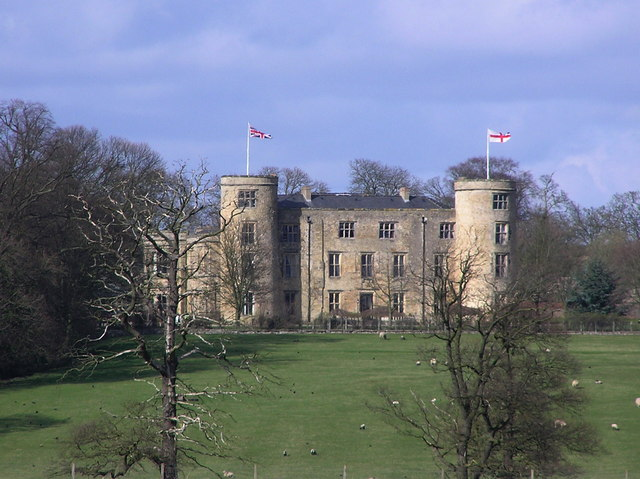
Walworth Castle, south elevation

This Tudor castle, dating from around 1600, is a manor house built of partially rendered limestone rubble, and the roof is of Welsh slate. The west tower is older, and has gunloops, narrow trefoil-headed and round-headed windows. It has a main, south-facing building of five bays and three storeys between two four-storey, round, angle towers, with east and west wings on the north side, making up three sides of a square originally open to the north. However a range of early 19th-century buildings on the north side of the square now encloses the courtyard. Until the early 21st century the building contained 17th-century glass, which has been removed to the Bowes Museum. Some flagstones of unknown date were discovered in situ in the cellar or basement of the castle in 2002. Internal renovation took place in 1740, so that the interior now has important mid−18th century features, such as Palladian plasterwork and Rococo details. In 1864 the main staircase was rebuilt and the west wing was given a new front. It is now a Grade I listed building.

=== Walworth park ===
The parkland south of Walworth Castle was originally enclosed demesne land, and as such there is still evidence of ridge and furrow fields. This field system may be associated with the lost settlement at North Farm, Walworth; however a possible enclosure has been identified in the park, close by. That means that besides the lost settlement near the castle at North Farm there could have been a second and possibly sequential lost settlement, or the same settlement was scattered or moved. At the southern edge of the park there is evidence of a U−shaped earthwork which may be associated with the possible enclosure.

=== Grounds ===
North of the castle there is a 19th-century set of patched brick and squared stone garden walls, dressed stone gate piers with pyramid-shaped tops and a greenhouse which are listed. The glazed wooden greenhouse has a taller central section with two lower wings. A medal apparently belonging to Thomas Jennison, the 16th-century builder of the castle, was found in 1937–1938 during road-widening work on Newton Lane. It was found under the north wall of the castle grounds, and it was engraved with an image of a bridge and Thomas Jennison's name. The 1870 Tudor revival castle lodge and gate is a listed building, because it imitates the medieval battlemented style to match the castle. The lodge and gate piers are both battlemented and the single-storey, L-shaped building has corner towers and rock-faced masonry with ashlar dressing. Huts to the east of the castle have been identified as the possible site of the World War II prisoner-of-war camp. The gardens to the north of the castle, including the glasshouse, were owned separately from the castle grounds and used for market gardening by 2003. They were sold again as a separate unit in 2010.

== Walworth Castle today ==
The building has been open in the past on National Heritage weekends. The castle attracts imaginative stories of ghosts, and the hotel business has taken advantage of this in the past at Halloween. The castle restaurant used to have variable reviews, however the restaurant earned a three−star classification from the RAC and AA in 2002. There have been problems with reduction of public transport access to the castle. In 2001 Walworth Castle Hotel became the 100th member to join Darlington and District Business Club. In celebration of the Golden Jubilee of Elizabeth II in 2002, there was a children's fancy dress party at the castle in aid of charity. Further charity fundraising events have been held at the castle including a car boot sale in 2002, and a Butterwick Children's Hospice event in 2003, which included staged Viking marauders. In 2007 the castle was lit up with pink light on the evening of Valentine's Day. In 2008 the castle was on the route of the Quaker Triathlon charity event, organised by the local Rotary Club. In 2009 Darlington Education Village, previously Haughton School, held its formal ball at the castle. The building is used as a polling station during elections.

== See also ==
- Castles in Great Britain and Ireland
- List of castles in England
