= Cockerton =

Area of Darlington, County Durham, England

Coordinates: 54.534345°N 1.574194°W

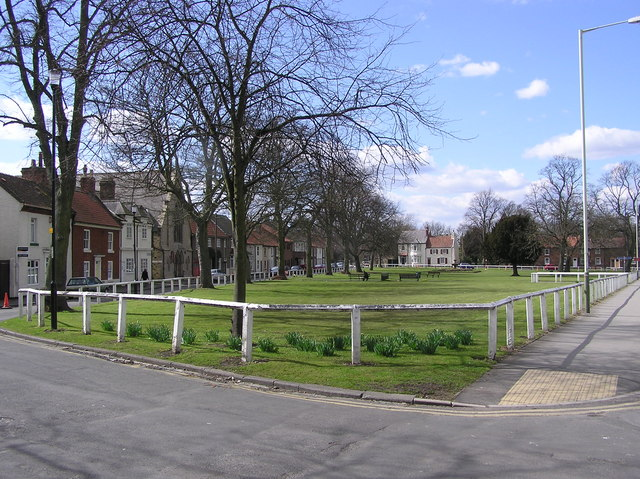
- Cockerton Green

- Location within County Durham
- Population: 9,502 (2011.wards)
- OS grid reference: NZ275155
- Unitary authority: Darlington
- Ceremonial county: Durham
- Region: North East
- Country: England
- Sovereign state: United Kingdom
- Police: Durham
- Fire: County Durham and Darlington
- Ambulance: North East

Cockerton is an area in the north-west of Darlington in the borough of Darlington, County Durham, England. The Cocker Beck flows through the area and empties into the River Skerne via The Denes, an area and string of valleyed parks donated for the town in the early 20th century. It is also near Mowden, Branksome, West Park and Faverdale.

== Etymology ==
The -ton of Cockerton is from Old English tūn 'estate'; the cocker- element is less certain but seems to have been a Cumbric river-name, still represented as the name of Cocker Beck.

== Cockerton Village ==
The original village layout, known still as "Cockerton Village", remains recognisable. This is mainly due to the village green and surrounding houses and cottages being well preserved, with most rebuilding having been carried out with sympathy to the adjacent surroundings. The village is also largely covered by the Cockerton Conservation Area, which is managed by Darlington Borough Council.

== Amenities, facilities and services ==
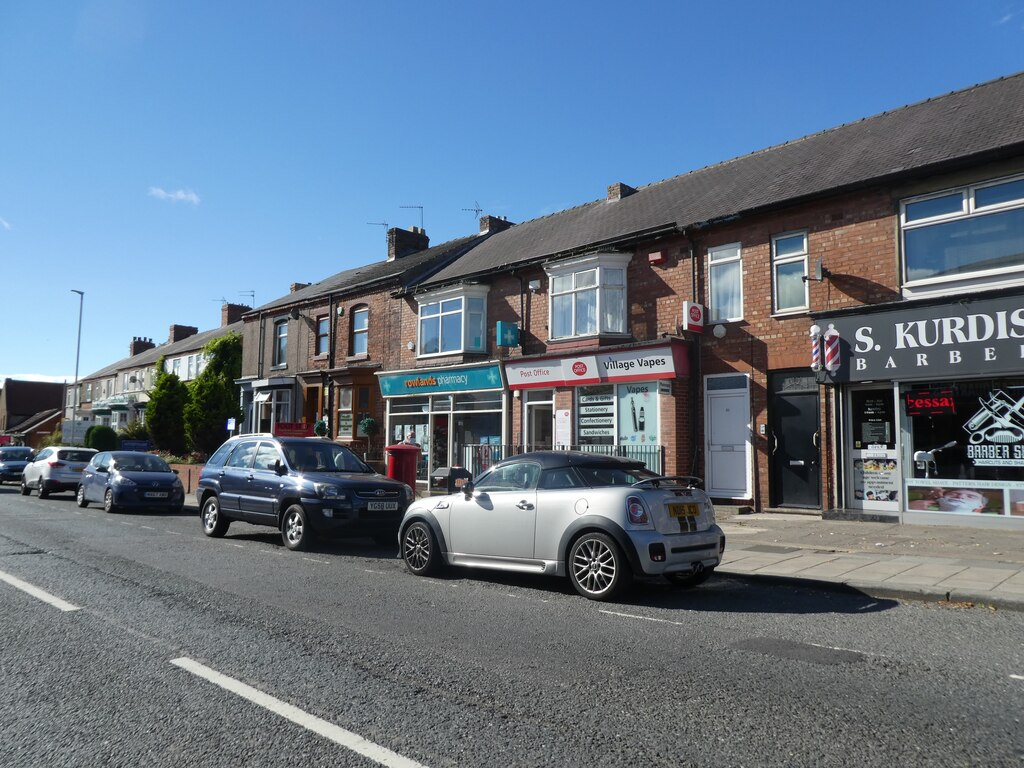
Shops on West Auckland Road

A selection of mostly independent retailers are based around this area with some chain stores such as a Co-operative food store and a post office. There is local pubs, chemists, a florist, a fruiterer, bakers, butchers, a discount food store, barbers, cafés, estate agents, insurance brokers and financial advisers.

Cockerton Library has been housed in an award-winning building from 1970.

There are several churches on and adjacent to the green, including St. Mary's CofE, Holy Family Roman Catholic and Cockerton Methodist Church.

== Cockerton Band ==
The village is also home to the historic Cockerton Prize Silver Band. The band was established in 1863, when James Hoggett, a local music teacher, brought a number of young Cockerton men together to form a small band. The band was originally known as "The Chickens" but was changed later by Hoggett to "reflect the true values of the band". The band still rehearse twice a week and are regularly out performing.

== Governance ==
Cockerton was formerly a township in the parish of Darlington, in 1866 Cockerton became a separate civil parish, on 1 April 1915 the parish was abolished and merged with Darlington and Archdeacon Newton. In 1911 the parish had a population of 1099. It is now in the unparished area of Darlington.

== Education ==
The community of Cockerton is served by schools across the town of Darlington but particularly by local schools. These include:

Primary:

- St. Mary's Cockerton Church of England Primary
- Alderman Leach Primary School
- Holy Family RC Primary School
- Mount Pleasant Primary School

Secondary:

- Darlington School of Maths and Science
- Carmel RC Technology College
- Hummersknott School
