= Archdeacon Newton =

Coordinates: 54.55211°N 1.60727°W

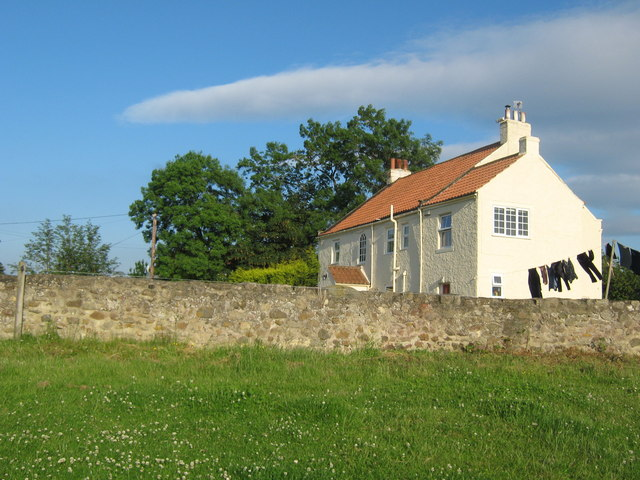
- Garthorne Farm at Archdeacon Newton

- Location within County Durham
- OS grid reference: NZ255175
- Unitary authority: Darlington
- Ceremonial county: County Durham
- Region: North East
- Country: England
- Sovereign state: United Kingdom
- Post town: DARLINGTON
- Postcode district: DL2
- Dialling code: 01325
- Police: Durham
- Fire: County Durham and Darlington
- Ambulance: North East
- UK Parliament: Sedgefield

Archdeacon Newton is a hamlet and rural parish of several farms in the borough of Darlington and the ceremonial county of County Durham, in England. The population taken at the 2011 Census was less than 100. Details are maintained in the parish of Walworth. It is associated with an abandoned village site under pasture and farm buildings, and situated a short distance to the north-west of Darlington. The lost settlement was in existence by the early 15th century, and remained inhabited at least until the 1890s. There was a moated manor house at the southern end, part of which remains as the Old Hall, now a barn. At the north end of the site was the chapel, and in the middle were tofts and enclosures, with a ridge and furrow field and a trackway leading to the south-east. The site of the abandoned village is now a scheduled monument and the Old Hall is a listed building.

== Geographical and political ==
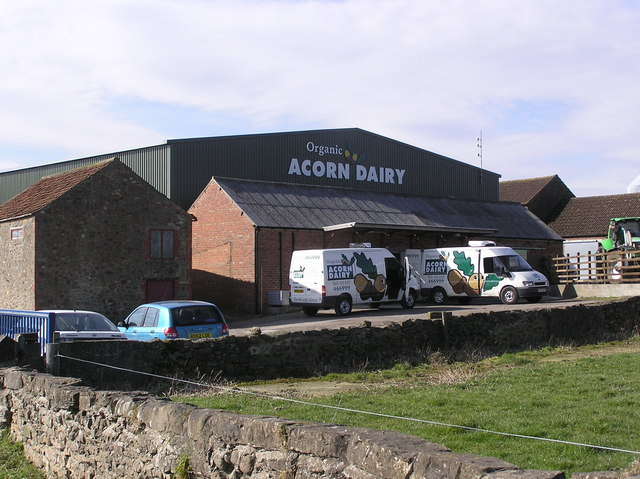
Townend Farm

The underlying composition here is of glacial clay with pockets of gravel, sand, peat and alluvium, and patches of dolomite and carboniferous limestone. This is a small hamlet incorporating Hall Farm, Garthorne Farm and Townend Farm on an approach road south of Newton Lane. It is the focus of the parish of Archdeacon Newton rural ward, and its councillor is Rosalind Tweddle. It is situated on flat land 0.62 miles (1.00 km) to the north-west of the Branksome suburb of Darlington, and 0.31 miles (0.50 km) to the north-west of the A1 road. At Cockerton near the southern end of Newton Lane and 1.2 miles (1.9 km) to the south-east of the hamlet is its namesake, the Archdeacon pub; Michael Perry, Archdeacon of Durham, posed for the sign in 1980, although the sign has since been replaced.

== History ==
The hamlet apparently once contained a chapel; it now a parish of 1,063.5 acres (4.304 km^{2}), although it was once part of Darlington parish. The area enclosed by Townend Farm and Archdeacon Newton's approach road to the west, Newton Lane to the north, and Hall Farm to the south contains the site of a medieval abandoned village, with visible earthworks in pasture at the northern end and farm buildings at the southern end of the site: this is a scheduled monument. The hamlet's name derives from the fact that in the Middle Ages the Archdeacon of Durham founded and built what is now the abandoned village. An alternative theory says that the land was leased from the archdeacon. Around 1800, Hilton "High Price" Middleton of Archdeacon Newton bred a great Durham Ox, and the now-defunct Newton Kyloe pub at Cockerton Green was named after it. In 1894 the land was owned by the Church Commissioners and the population was 52; down from its highest level of 72 in 1801, when pews were reserved for Archdeacon Newton people at St Cuthbert's in the centre of Darlington, and Methodist prayers were said in a farmhouse kitchen. This was before the nearer church of Holy Trinity, Darlington, was built in 1836. The 1851 census shows residents with surnames of Brown and Geldart or Geldert.

=== Archaeological sites and finds ===
The manor of this village survives at Hall Farm as a farm building with some medieval features, and an adjacent farm building was probably once an early 16th-century house. Apart from these buildings, the abandoned village is indicated by earthworks of a medieval moated site and enclosures. There are also indications of three fish ponds, of which one is still a duck pond, and two contain rubbish; however it is now thought that there was originally a single fish pond. One of the supposed fish ponds is among the farm buildings and is overgrown. Prehistoric and Roman remains have not yet been found here, as there have been no excavations as of April 2010.

==== Abandoned settlement ====
The area to the east of the Archdeacon Newton approach road, and to the south of Newton Lane, is the location of the medieval abandoned village and scheduled monument. The manor and house were at the southern end of a settlement which had three farms and a row of cottages, indicated in the existing pasture by house platforms. It is now thought that the buildings were tenant tofts attached to the manor, and not a nucleated village. Cobbled banks and ditches running east to west and situated towards the north end of the site identify the original enclosures of these tofts. The banks are 13 feet (4.0 m) wide and 2 feet (0.61 m) high, and the ditches are 10 feet (3.0 m) wide and 1 foot (0.30 m) deep. There is an associated ridge and furrow field, and a 13 feet (4.0 m) wide trackway runs from halfway along the east side of the site, in a south-easterly direction, for 790 feet (240 m) as far as a modern fence. An undated trench for electricity supply was dug at Hall Farm at the southern end of the hamlet's approach road, surveyed by an archaeological watching brief, but nothing of historical interest was found.

==== Old Hall and moated site ====
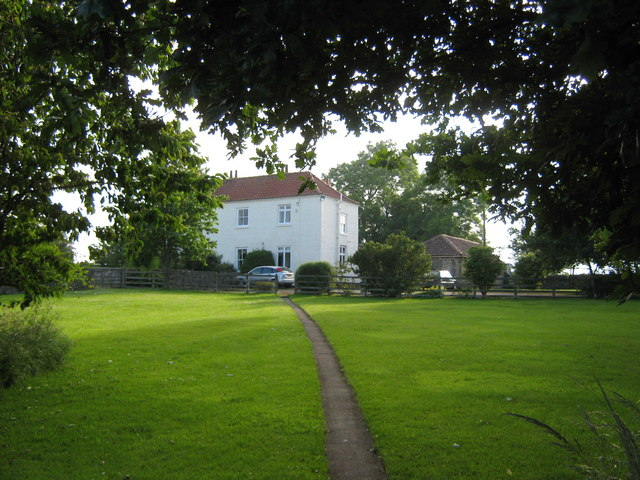
Hall Farm with Old Hall to its right

The Old Hall, one of the farm buildings at the centre of Hall Farm, is a surviving medieval domestic building or manor house, probably dating from the 14th century and remodelled in the 16th and 17th century. It was burned and then re-roofed in the early 21st century, and no internal partitions survive. This is a two-storey listed building which was converted to a barn in the 19th century, has a Welsh slate roof and seven internal bays. It is built of squared and rubble masonry with ashlar dressing. The structure includes medieval and Tudor carved stone, including mullions and fireplaces. Buttresses, broken arches and fireplaces of the manor are still standing and are incorporated in the Old Hall. It is 59 feet (18 m) by 30 feet (9.1 m), containing two Tudor fireplaces, with the remains of archways on the outside walls at each end.

The moated manor house stood at the southern end of the abandoned village site, where there are now farm buildings. In the 16th and 17th centuries the manor had a hall with parlour and chamber over the hall, a new chamber, a little chamber, a "lofte beneath the doors", a buttery, a kitchen and a stable. Depressions in the ground at the southern end of the site indicate the position of the original moat.

==== Chapel ====
It is thought that the chapel was on the 6.5 feet (2.0 m) high triangular platform at the north end of the site and on the south side of Newton Lane. There is a ditch along the south side of this feature. Evidence for the chapel exists in a licence given in 1414 to Robert Fisher, John Nicholson and John Deves to hold religious services in a chapel at Archdeacon Newton.

==== Enclosure ====
Another enclosure has been identified by aerial photography 0.31 miles (0.50 km) north-west of the hamlet, and on the south side of Newton Lane.
