= Walworth, County Durham =

Village in Darlington, England

Coordinates: 54.565°N 1.639°W

Walworth
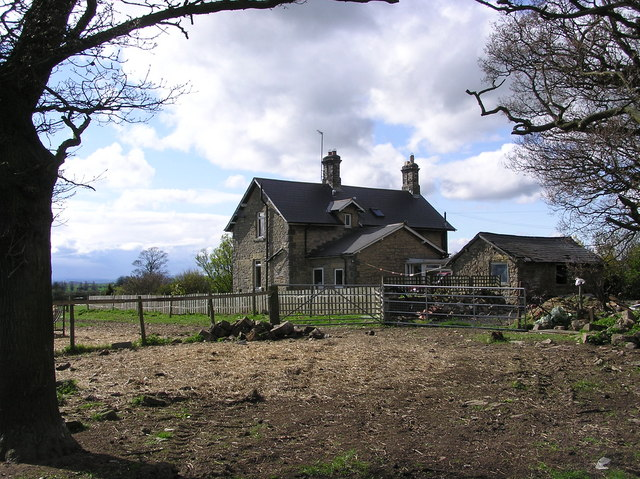
- Cuckoo House, an outlying part of Walworth

- Location within County Durham
- Population: 240 (including Archdeacon Newton and Houghton-le-Side. 2011)
- OS grid reference: NZ234188
- Unitary authority: Darlington
- Ceremonial county: County Durham
- Region: North East
- Country: England
- Sovereign state: United Kingdom
- Post town: Darlington
- Postcode district: DL2
- Dialling code: 01325
- Police: Durham
- Fire: County Durham and Darlington
- Ambulance: North East
- UK Parliament: Sedgefield

Walworth is a central small village with outlying farmsteads, which together constitute a scattered village in the borough of Darlington and the ceremonial county of County Durham, England. It is a civil parish which does not have a church. It is situated 2.5 miles (4.0 km) to the north-west of Darlington. The nucleus of the central village is the 16th-century Walworth Castle, which is now a hotel. On the north side of the village, around North Farm, are earthworks signifying a lost settlement, grouped around a barn which was once a chapel.

== Central village location and structure ==
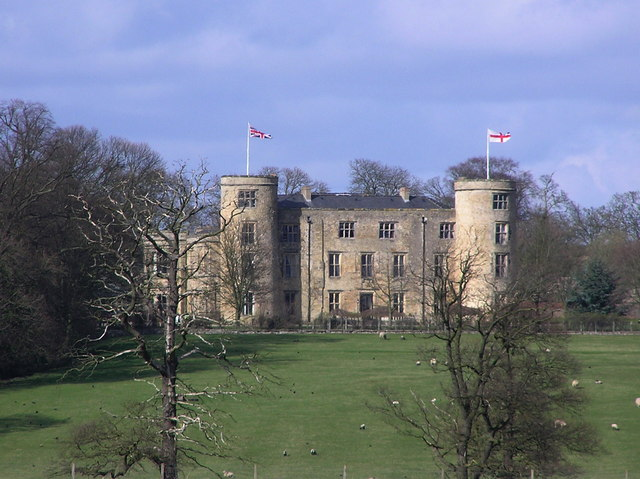
Walworth Castle, the nucleus of the central village

Walworth and Walworth Gate are said to be on the line of the Roman road, Dere Street. Walworth is located at the T-junction where Newton Lane meets Walworth Road and the disused Quarry Hole, 2.5 miles (4.0 km) north-west of Darlington and 0.31 miles (0.50 km) east of Denton. The village is triangular in plan, with Walworth Castle and Walworth Park at its centre. North Farm and the lost settlement of Walworth are at the north corner; Castle farm and Tomtit Wood are at the south-west corner, and Walworth Grange and a few houses are at the south-east corner. The village used to be part of Heighington parish, but the settlement now has its own civil parish. Although there is evidence of a former chapel in the lost settlement, the village does not have a church. The population here is very low; in 2001 there were only 167 people on the electoral roll of Denton, Walworth and Houghton-le-Side who were eligible to vote at Walworth Castle polling station.

== Demographics ==
The population of this civil parish at the 2011 Census was 240.

== Walworth Castle ==
The central feature of the village (and its only landmark for miles) is the very large, 16th-century mansion house built in the style of a medieval castle, which is now a hotel. It is a Grade I listed building, probably built by Thomas Holt in around 1600 for Thomas Jennison. It may be that earthworks and cropmarks in Walworth Park in the castle grounds signify a lost settlement associated with the one at North Farm. Several of the buildings around the castle have historical relevance to the site, as many former employees (such as a groundskeeper recorded in a census from the 1800s) were housed in these cottages as part of their employment. While it is unknown whether the castle was officially used for defence, the gunloops on the outside suggest it was potentially at least a fortified mansion by the 16th-century.

The plan of the building is a rough L-shape. The castle itself rectangular, surrounding the inner courtyard, with two cylindrical towers on the southern face and an annex built onto the north-western corner. The original construction of the castle began in the 1150s and was finished in 1189, though much of the original 12th-century building was demolished and replaced with the current construction during the 1600s. The north side of the current building was originally a series of outbuildings that were added sometime in the 1800s, closing off the original north-facing courtyard. Before this addition, this courtyard once housed the entrance used after the 16th-century reconstruction, but this set of wooden doors must have stopped being used after the grand staircase was built, as it blocks entrance from the courtyard. Today this courtyard is a covered dining room known as "The Cardinal's Court" and a large glass wall to the south allows observation of the original entrance from inside The Cardinal's Court. Surrounding the former main entrance, a set of columns mark each floor with a different style of column stacked one on top of the other, with each capital becoming more ostentatious as they get higher (Tuscan, Ionic, and Corinthian in that order) in a show of grandeur.

An annex built onto the side (known as "The West Wing") forms the long side of the L-shaped building. The West Wing itself stands on the ground which was originally the stables of the castle. The only sections of the castle that remain from the original 1100s construction are the western tower and the dungeon. Both areas have been heavily altered from their original form, as the tower now contains a library and two bedrooms, while the dungeon was converted into a wine cellar sometime in The Victorian Period. The dungeon was originally a much larger room, with the floor being approximately six feet lower, and the length of the room being double what it is now, extending underneath the "Library Tower" to the west side. The Library Tower, the bedrooms above, and the dungeon below (said to have been connected to the bedrooms by a now-blocked secret staircase) are all believed to be haunted as a result of their age, as well as several rumoured events from the castle's past. One such story involves an illicit affair between one of the castle's lords and a handmaid, which ended in a murder when the handmaid fell pregnant. Some stories conflate the sealing off of the aforementioned staircase to the dungeon with this rumour, claiming the maid was bricked into the now-hidden space. Of course, these stories cannot be verified.

It is believed that the space occupied by the current afternoon tea room, and The Library Tower attached to it, were once a Medieval-era solar room. In the opposite tower, to the south, is the famous "King James I Suite" on the first floor. This is so named because it was supposedly the room where Scotland's King James IV stayed in during his 1603 stop at the castle during the journey to London, where he was crowned King James I of England. This room is richly decorated and retains some of the 17th-century style and features, such as a door that can hide the bedroom entrance away from the rest of the suite. Other large bedrooms and suites exist on the upper floors, but these are mostly used as administrative spaces. The castle walls still stand as a fringe to the property, though these were largely decorative, and the original gatehouse is present at the entrance. This building was used as lodging for employees, though recently it was the housing for the previous owners of the castle, and around the 2010s it became a holiday lodge under the AirBnB brand. Another AirBnB cottage is situated in the north-west corner of the grounds.

Throughout much of the history of the castle, it was owned by the Hansard family. Other notable families which have owned the castle include the Ayscough family, who gained ownership of the castle through a marriage in 1539; the Jenison family, who bought the castle in 1579 after the Ayscough family passed with no heirs and likely were the group behind the extensive reconstruction; and finally ownership became a running carousel of various owners between 1759 and 1931.

During The Second World War, The Durham Light Infantry gained control of the site and began to use the castle as a training ground under the command of Major Rollin Holmes, as well as a prisoner-of-war camp for German and Italian officers captured in the European Theatre. Likely around this time, a second outbuilding was constructed behind the castle which was probably a barracks, though the only evidence remaining of this construction is a buried concrete foundation and references in architectural plans from the period. In 1950 the Durham County Council bought the castle and it was converted into a boarding school for "troubled girls" which operated through the 1960s. Most of the books on display in the castle are left over from this school, including some which still contain graffiti from the pupils. During this time The West Wing was built as a dormitory for the students.

The castle was sold by the council in 1981 and became a hotel, which is how it remains today. It is currently a partner of the Best Western hotel chain and the current owners run the hotel independently under the brand.

== History ==
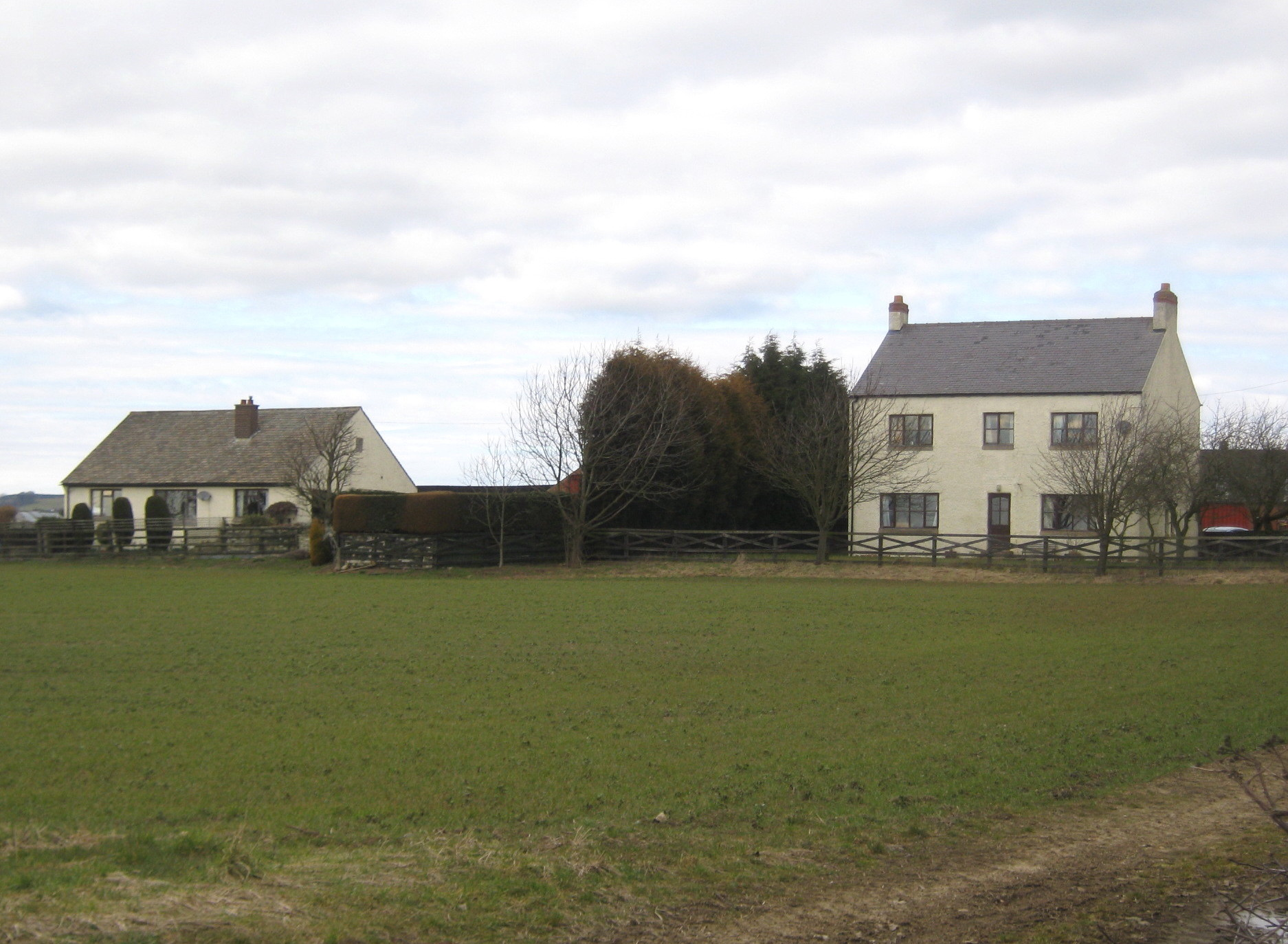
Swan House farm

The name "Walworth" means Welsh settlement, and it used to be known as Waleberge after the Saxons claimed it. It is thought that Walworth was planned as a village with the previous castle around 1150 by the Hansard family as part of their 1,100 acres (4.5 km^{2}) estate. There is a legend that Malcolm III of Scotland destroyed the village on his way along the River Tees. Following the Black Death there was a change of ownership of the manor to the Neville family by 1367, but in 1391 Robert Hansard claimed it back. The Ayscough family acquired the manor by marriage in 1539, then Thomas Jenison bought it in 1579 when the Ayscough family had no heirs. At the death of Elizabeth Jenison in 1605, the farm stock inventory included 50 oxen besides cattle, sheep, pigs, horses and corn. In 1759 the estate left the hands of the Jenisons due to the death and debts of Ralph Jenison. From 1759 to 1831 the estate belonged to Matthew Stephenson, and then it was sold to the Aylmer family who owned it until 1931. Their descendants Neville and Charles Eade owned it from 1931 to 1950, and then it was sold in 1950 to Durham County Council. The estate was broken up and sold into private ownership in 1981, and present ownership of the village is unknown.

== Historical sites ==
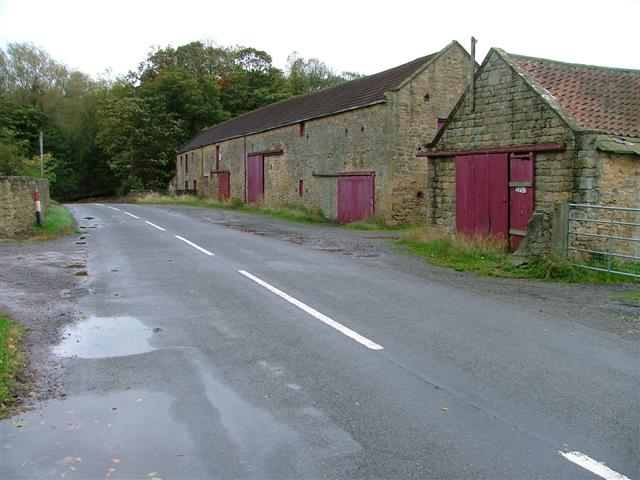
Barns at Castle Farm

There is no evidence of prehistoric or Roman activity in this area, but the area has not been fully excavated. In May 2004 a barbed and tanged arrowhead was found at Quarry Cottage, where Newton Lane meets Walworth Road. Because this site was a quarry, the arrowhead may have been moved from its original site before it was found. In 1991 some archaeological evaluation trenches were dug next to the castle itself, in advance of hotel development; however, no traces were found of archaeological material. About 0.6 miles (0.97 km) to the east of Walworth, in a field just east of Back Lane, is the site of a former post-medieval brick and tile works. There was another brick and tile works 0.3 miles (0.48 km) north-east of North Farm on Silver Hill, just west of Back Lane.

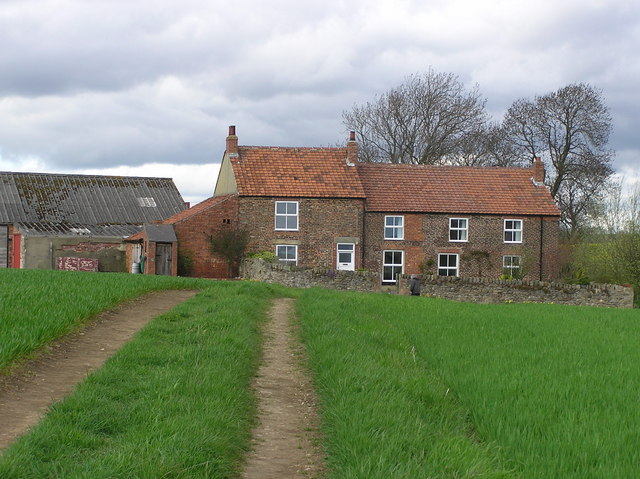
Coldsides Farm, on the edge of the parish

North of the village, just south of New Moor Farm and just to the west of Walworth Road, is the site of a post-medieval lime kiln. The disused limestone quarry called Quarry Hole, where Newton Lane meets Walworth Road, is post-medieval also, and it once had an associated lime kiln. 0.9 miles (1.4 km) north-west of Walworth, between Newton Lane and the A68 road, is the post-medieval Paradise Cottage, once known as Hood's Cottage, with an associated well. There is an overgrown well on the west side of Walworth Road and level with the castle gate, at the north end of Tomtit Wood. It is made of stone with a trough to collect water. Estimated to be about 0.31 miles (0.50 km) west of Walworth village, and halfway between Walworth and Denton, is the site of a medieval mill. The evidence for this is from field names on tithe maps and manuscripts. There is a late 18th- or early 19th-century listed ice house to the east of Quarry End, at Quarry Hole. It is built into a bank, and has a partially-collapsed barrel-vaulted passage connected to a deep, egg-shaped cavity intended for the ice. It is built of coursed rubble and the inside is brick-lined. On the east side of Walworth Grange are a Grade II listed late 18th- or early 19th-century threshing barn and gin gang. They are built of limestone with pantiled roofs, and the gin gang is semi-octagonal with square piers and later infilled walls.

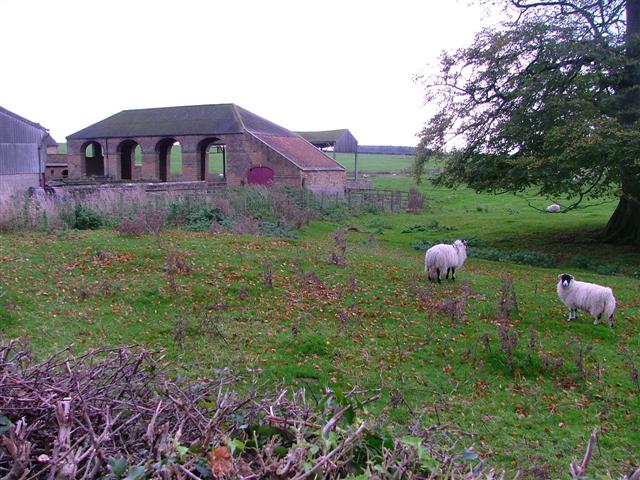
Barns at Castle farm

Parkside Farmhouse at Castle Farm is a listed building, built in the early 19th century with squared limestone walls and purple slate roof. On its south side is a large 19th-century, two-storey, pantiled, square-plan dovecote which is listed separately along with some sheds, including a possible bee bole. The 19th-century limestone gate piers with rounded tops and 5 feet (1.5 m) to 6.5 feet (2.0 m) high limestone garden wall of Parkside Farmhouse are listed also. The wall has flat coping and is L-shaped, surrounding two sides of the farmhouse. The wall may have contained flues to heat soft fruit. Also on the south side of the farm house is another set of early 19th-century listed sheds and barn with assorted roofing: asbestos, pantiles and stone flags. The single-storey sheds contain blocked arches. There is also a listed 19th-century haybarn and former potato shed on the south side of the farmhouse. The haybarn is built of squared limestone and sandstone with brick arches.

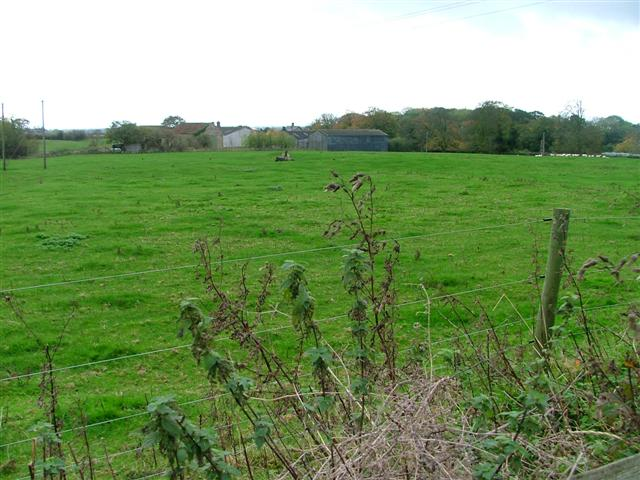
Site of lost settlement at North Farm

=== Lost settlement ===
At the north end of the village, the fields on the east and west sides of the North Farm buildings contain earthworks signifying a lost settlement. There are some isolated ruins and two rows of building foundations, and ditches and banks which form enclosures. The chapel was built in 1180 of squared and coursed rubble, and has since been incorporated into the northernmost farm building with blocked original openings and indications of the original door and window still visible, although it has 19th-century doorways and a pantiled roof. Inside there is evidence of a pointed arch containing a piscina with trefoil head, and a large aumbry at the east end of the south wall. The opening at the east end on the north wall is also possibly an aumbry. There is evidence of ridge and furrow fields remaining in Walworth Park which may be associated with this settlement. In 2007 there was a watching brief when an electricity supply trench was dug in the middle of the lost settlement site, just north-east of the farm buildings, but no archaeological evidence was found.
