= Houghton-le-Side =

Village in County Durham, England

Coordinates: 54.590°N 1.656°W

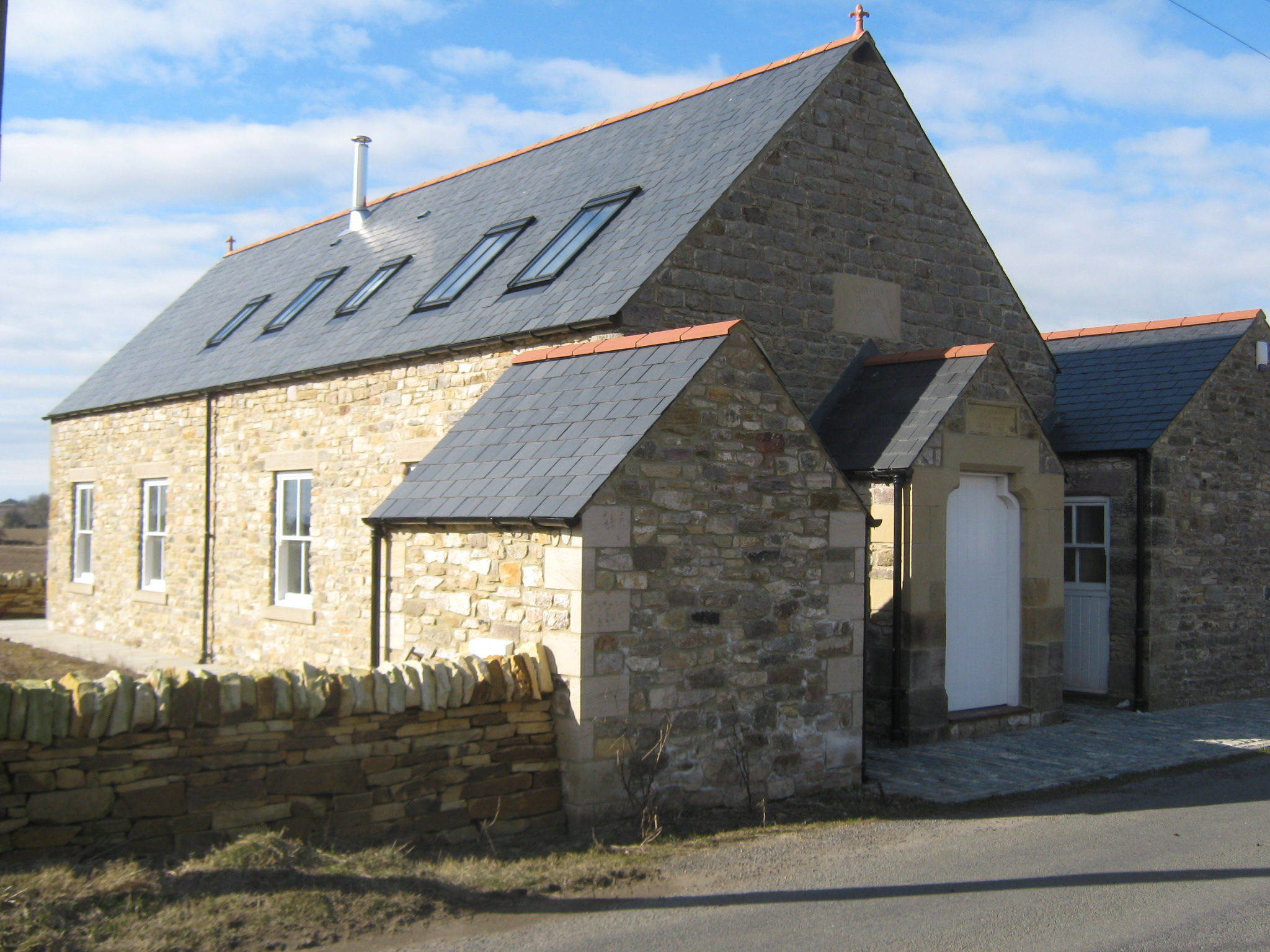
Chapel House

Houghton-le-Side is a small village in the borough of Darlington and the ceremonial county of County Durham, England. It is situated a few miles to the south-west of Newton Aycliffe.

Details are now maintained within the parish of Walworth.

== Demographics ==
The population at the 2011 Census was less than 100.
