= Walworth Gate =

Coordinates: 54.576°N 1.639°W

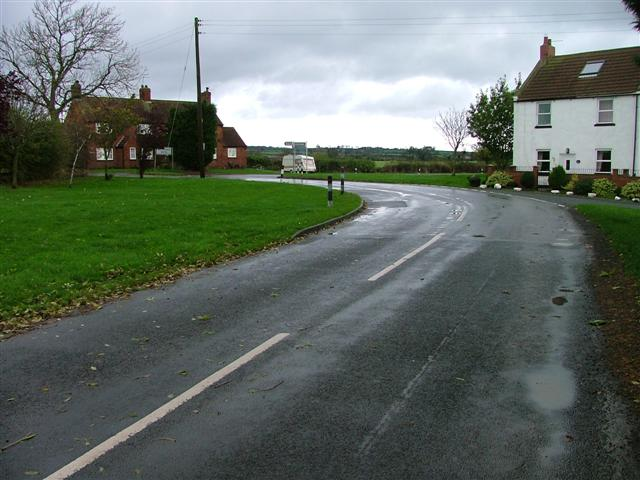
- Walworth Gate

- Location within County Durham
- OS grid reference: NZ234201
- Unitary authority: Darlington
- Ceremonial county: County Durham
- Region: North East
- Country: England
- Sovereign state: United Kingdom
- Post town: Darlington
- Postcode district: DL2
- Dialling code: 01325
- Police: Durham
- Fire: County Durham and Darlington
- Ambulance: North East
- UK Parliament: Sedgefield

Walworth Gate is a hamlet and crossroads village in the borough of Darlington, in the civil parish of Walworth and the ceremonial county of County Durham, England. It is situated 2 miles (3.2 km) north−west of the edge of Darlington and 0.6 miles (0.97 km) north of Walworth. The settlement is locally notable for New Moor Farm, which is known to Darlington people as a producer of ice cream. The Saxon origin of the name, "Walworth Gate", refers to Welsh−speaking Britons who once lived there.

== Geography ==
The hamlet used to be part of Heighington parish, but today it is part of the civil parish of Walworth. It consists of a few dwellings at the crossroads of Back Lane and Walworth Road, together with the outlying Cowfold Farm, Throstle Nest and Grimshaw Cottage. Swan House Farm and New Moor Farm may be considered to be associated with either Walworth Gate or Walworth, as these farms are equidistant from both settlements. Walworth Gate has a two−hourly number 97 bus service from Darlington, a service which began in 2001.

== History ==
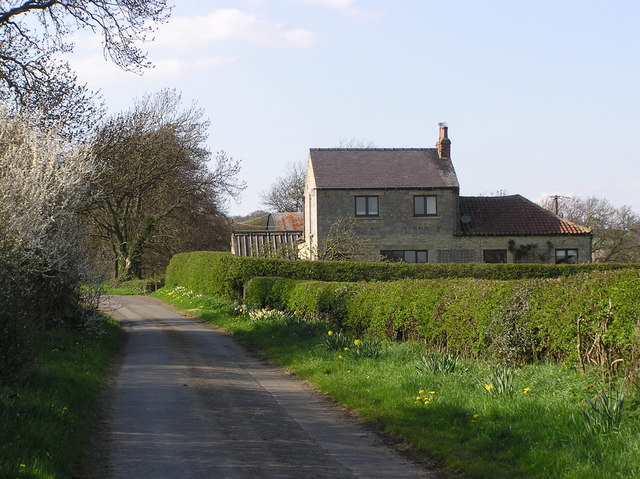
Grimshaw Cottage

The origin of the name, Walworth Gate, is made up of three elements. "Wal" was the Saxon term for the Wealas, or Welsh−speaking Britons, although to the Saxons themselves it just meant "foreign language". A worth was an enclosure, and "gate" comes from Old English gat, or roadway. The worth could be the enclosure at the nearby Walworth lost settlement, and the gat could be the road to Walworth. This would be the original line of the Roman road, Dere Street, which is thought to have passed through Walworth Gate and Walworth on its route between the Roman forts at Piercebridge and Binchester. At some time before 1852 there was a smithy on the eastern corner of the crossroads. Only one man, Jacob Grainger, in Walworth Gate was eligible to vote in 1868–1869.

== New Moor Farm ==
New Moor Farm, run by John Archer and his father Robert, previously kept Holstein Friesians but the herd was lost in the 2001 United Kingdom foot-and-mouth crisis. Today it is run by John and Susan Archer and is known in Darlington for its Archers ice cream which has been made on the premises in two converted garages and an old forge since 2004 using 4% of the milk from the Jersey herd of 330 cows. The cattle are descendants from three herds in Cornwall, Hampshire and Jersey. In summer 2005 an ice cream parlour was opened at the farm, and that Christmas it offered Christmas pudding ice cream. In 2005 the farm sold 4,000 litres (880 imp gal) of ice cream, and the following year it sold 8,000 litres (1,800 imp gal). In 2006 the farm had a milk quota of 1,500,000 litres (330,000 imp gal) and it was processed by Acorn Dairy at Archdeacon Newton. In 2007 the farm supplied 90 litres of milk a day to Flamingoland to feed a new−born Rothschild giraffe which had been rejected by its mother. New Moor Farm was one of the farms which took part in the fourth annual Open Farm Sunday in May 2008. In 2008 the farm opened another ice cream parlour at The Station in Richmond. In 2009 the ice cream received the Taste of the North−East of England accreditation in the 2009 North−East England Tourism Awards. In 2010 a second business, Newmoor Veal, was started because the herd produces 150 male calves a year, many of which would previously be shot at birth because they are considered unsuitable for beef production. The new production company allows the veal calves to be suckled by their mothers and to live for seven months.

== Walworth Gate today ==
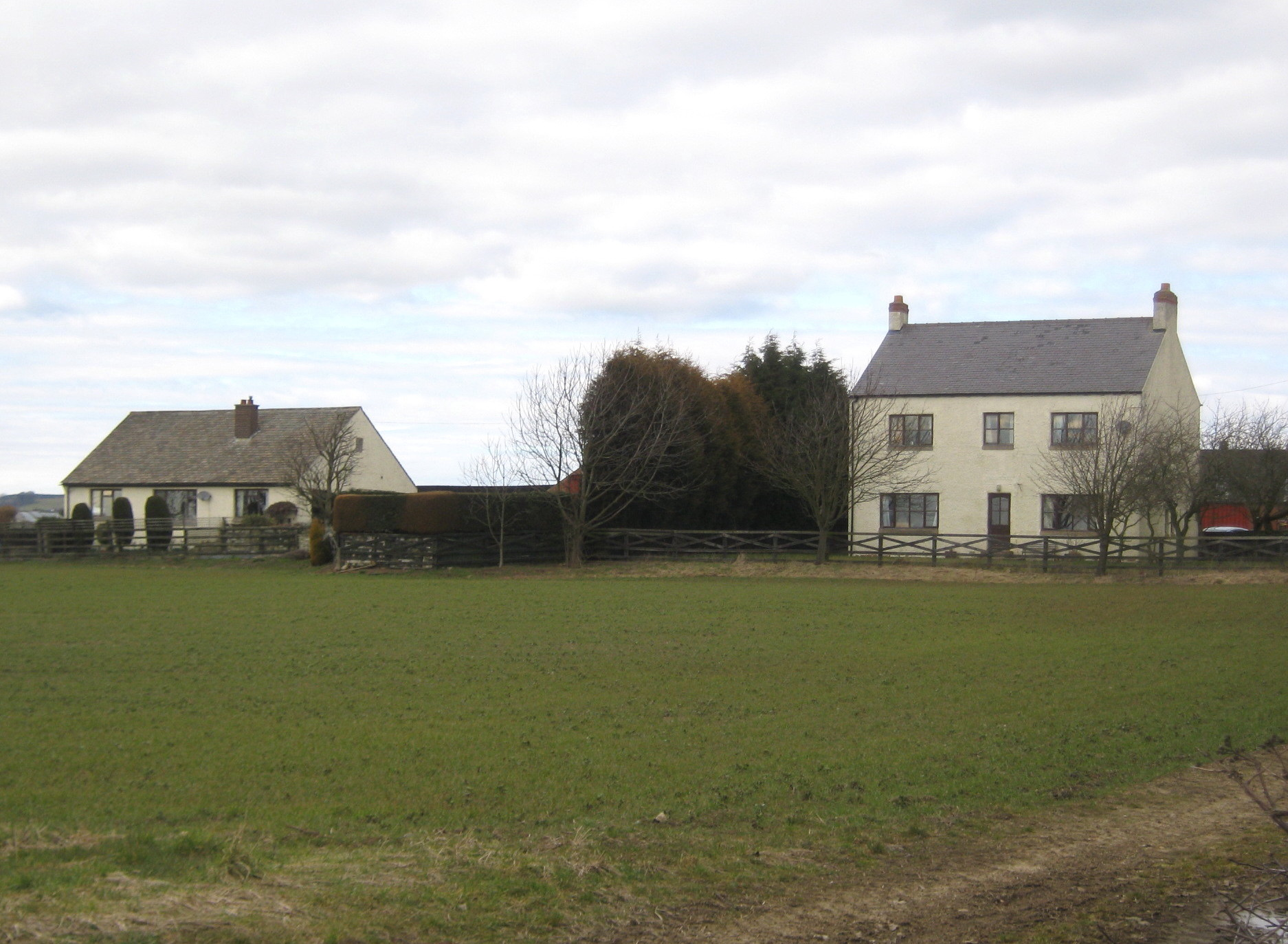
Swan House Farm

=== Sport and gardening ===
Lorna Herron won one of the Area Number One gardening prizes for her garden in the hamlet in 2001. Because of its crossroads, Walworth Gate regularly finds itself on local cycling routes; for example the Darlington Freewheelers ride through it. In 2005 and 2006 the crossroads was on three of the cycling routes organised for the Bike It project and Darlington Bike Week. In 2008 the hamlet was on the route of Darlington Rotary Club's Quaker Triathlon charity event.

=== Crime ===
In 2003 a quad bike was stolen from premises in Walworth Gate. In 2006 some residents in the hamlet were targeted by two men, pretending to be water board officials, who allegedly attempted to gain entry to dwellings with the intent to rob. In 2007 two joyriders were arrested in Walworth Gate after allegedly crashing one vehicle, attempting to steal another and trying to evade arrest.

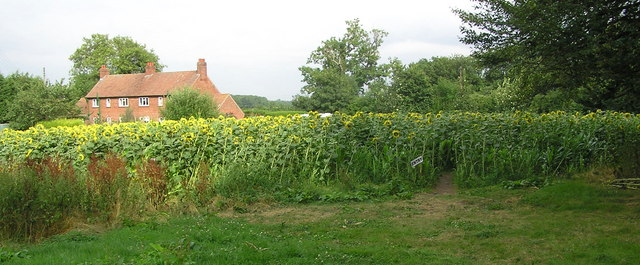
Sunflower maze at New Moor Farm, 2006
