= Wyvern Academy =

Location
- Eggleston View; Branksome; Darlington, County Durham, DL3 9SH; England; 54.5377°N 1.59675°W

Information
- Type: Academy
- Department for Education URN: 143845 Tables
- Ofsted: Reports
- Head teacher: Nadia Robinson
- Gender: Coeducational
- Age: 11 to 16
- Website: wyvernacademy.org

Wyvern Academy is a coeducational secondary school with academy status, located in the Branksome area of Darlington, County Durham, England. It educates pupils aged 11 to 16. The school was originally known as Branksome Comprehensive School until renamed the Darlington School of Maths and Science in 2011.

== History ==
In 1977, the school was used as the location for an edition of We Are the Champions (TV series).

In 2009, the school was officially designated as a Science and Mathematics College. The school converted to academy status in January 2012.

In 2011, the school was renamed from Branksome Comprehensive School to Darlington School of Maths and Science alongside refurbishments to the school.

In 2014, Darlington School of Maths and Science celebrated its 50th Anniversary.

In 2017, the school renamed itself from Darlington School of Maths and Science to Wyvern Academy. The rebranding occurred after the school was taken over by Consilium Academy Trust.
