= Branksome, County Durham =

Area of Darlington, England

Coordinates: 54.541°N 1.598°W

Branksome
- Location within County Durham
- OS grid reference: NZ260163
- Unitary authority: Darlington
- Ceremonial county: County Durham
- Region: North East
- Country: England
- Sovereign state: United Kingdom
- Post town: DARLINGTON
- Postcode district: DL3
- Police: Durham
- Fire: County Durham and Darlington
- Ambulance: North East

Branksome is a suburb of Darlington in County Durham, in England. It is situated to the north-west of the town, close to Mowden, Cockerton, West Park and Faverdale.

It is largely made up from council owned properties and service buildings started in the late 1940s through to the 1970s.

Although some of the council built houses and flats have been sold to tenants since the 1980s under the government 'right to buy' scheme, many are still retained as rented properties by the Housing Department of Darlington Borough Council (unitary authority). This management situation was consulted on in 2003-04 and the Housing Dept. retained management after consultations with tenants throughout the borough who expressed a desire to remain under local authority management rather than the alternatives.

It lies in the Cockerton West Ward of the Darlington Borough and elects two councillors every four years.

Adjacent to Branksome on the Northern side lies the old Darlington to Barnard Castle railway station . Although there is little evidence of this now having primarily been reclaimed by farmers. When Branksome was first built it was possible to follow the railway line all the way to Barnard Castle.
