= Best Western GB =

British hotel chain

Best Western Great Britain
- Company type: Marketing cooperative
- Industry: Hotels
- Founded: 1978
- Headquarters: York, Yorkshire, United Kingdom
- Area served: Great Britain and The Channel Islands
- Key people: Tim Rumney, CEO
- Members: 280 approximately
- Number of employees: 90
- Website: www.bestwestern.co.uk

Best Western GB is an independently owned and managed hotel chain in Great Britain and the Channel Islands with over 260 two-, three- and four-star properties. Best Western GB provides sales, revenue and marketing services to all of its member hotels. Best Western Hotels GB is the international trading name of Interchange and Consort Hotels Limited.

== History ==
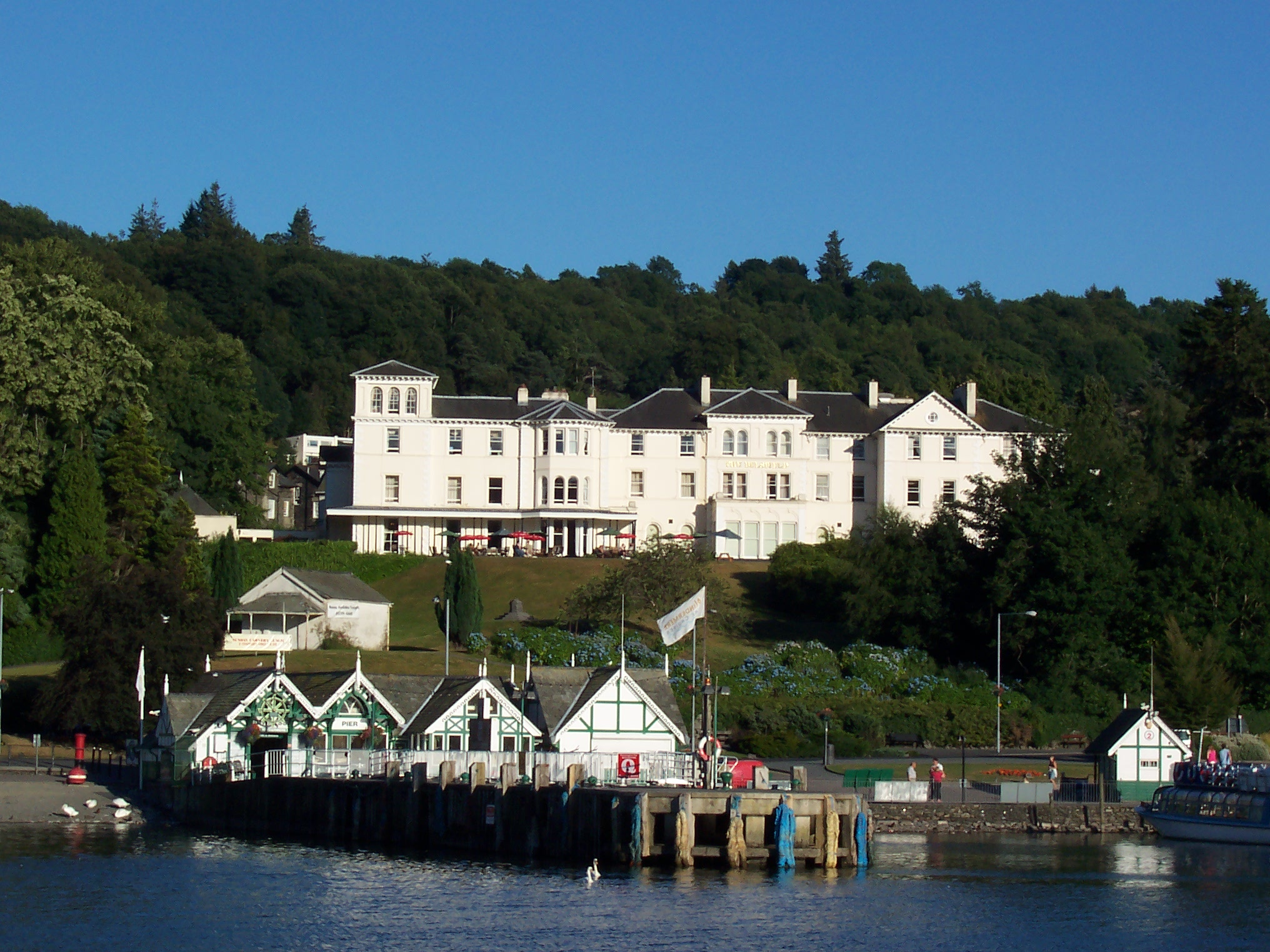
The Belsfield in Bowness-on-Windermere

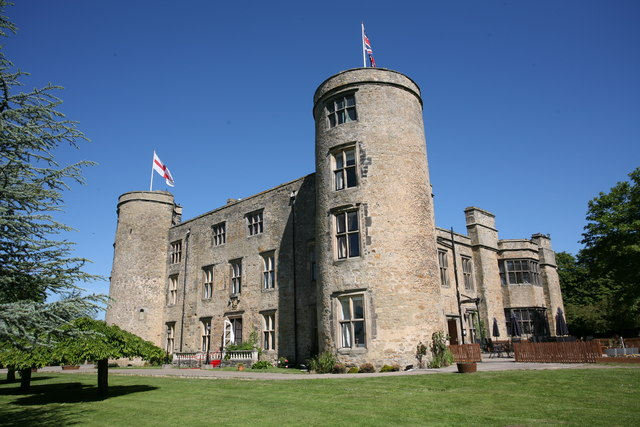
Walworth Castle

Best Western GB began in 1967 when five independent hoteliers from Cambridge, Chester, Kenilworth, Ripon and Torquay sought to work together to generate referrals, maximise their marketing budgets and increase sales. Together they formed Interchange Hotels of Great Britain. Within weeks of this formation, a further six independent hotels joined the group.

In 1978, the group elected to trade under the brand name Best Western Great Britain, effectively an affiliate of Best Western International in the US.

In 2018, Peel Hotels, owner of nine establishments, became members of Best Western hotels in the UK. In 2020, Corus Hotels joined the UK's Best Western hotels group. The additions include two Laura Ashley properties, The Iliffe in Coventry and The Belsfield in Bowness-on-Windermere (pictured) – a building designed by architect George Webster in 1844 and now a listed building.

== Locations ==
Best Western Hotels GB has a wide variety of hotels ranging from castles such as the Best Western Walworth Castle Hotel in Darlington, Grade II listed buildings such as Best Western Plus Grim's Dyke Hotel in Harrow Weald and White Hart Hotel, BW Premier Collection by Best Western in Harrogate to smaller hotels such as the Best Western Victoria Palace in London. They offer various lodging options located in cities and rural areas.

== Business model ==
Best Western Hotels GB became an affiliate member of Best Western International, based in the US, in 1978. Best Western International imposes an initial fee on member hotels, as well as an annual fee for each room. Best Western International also publishes a list of quality standards that each hotel needs to maintain. On joining Best Western Hotels GB, each hotel commits to an initial three years of membership with the group, after which membership rolls over on an annual basis. While hotels are encouraged to maintain their independent identities, they are required to use Best Western's branding and signage, and identify themselves as a Best Western hotel. The hotels can also use their own independent name as part of their identity.
