= Denton, County Durham =

Coordinates: 54.562278°N 1.668127°W

Denton
- Location within County Durham
- Ceremonial county: County Durham
- Region: North East
- Country: England
- Sovereign state: United Kingdom
- Post town: Darlington
- Postcode district: DL2
- Police: Durham
- Fire: County Durham and Darlington
- Ambulance: North East
- UK Parliament: Sedgefield

Denton is a village in the borough of Darlington and the ceremonial county of County Durham, England. The population of Denton taken at the 2011 Census was less than 100. Details are maintained in the parish of Gainford. It is situated a short distance to the north-west of Darlington between Walworth to the east and Summerhouse to the west. Houghton-Le-Side lies to the north and Piercebridge to the south.

The village is home to approximately 18 houses, new and old, all surrounding Denton Hall Farm and contained within the vast Raby Estate. Most of the farm buildings are whitewashed. There are many local legends explaining this. The most common of these is that Lord Barnard was lost in the mist and sought refuge in a farm house. Believing it to be one of his own he demanded his keep, only to discover that it was privately owned. To prevent such a mistake occurring again he ordered that all his buildings should be painted white.

Denton Hall Farm is a mixed farm of arable and livestock. Horse racing / training is a large part of village life.

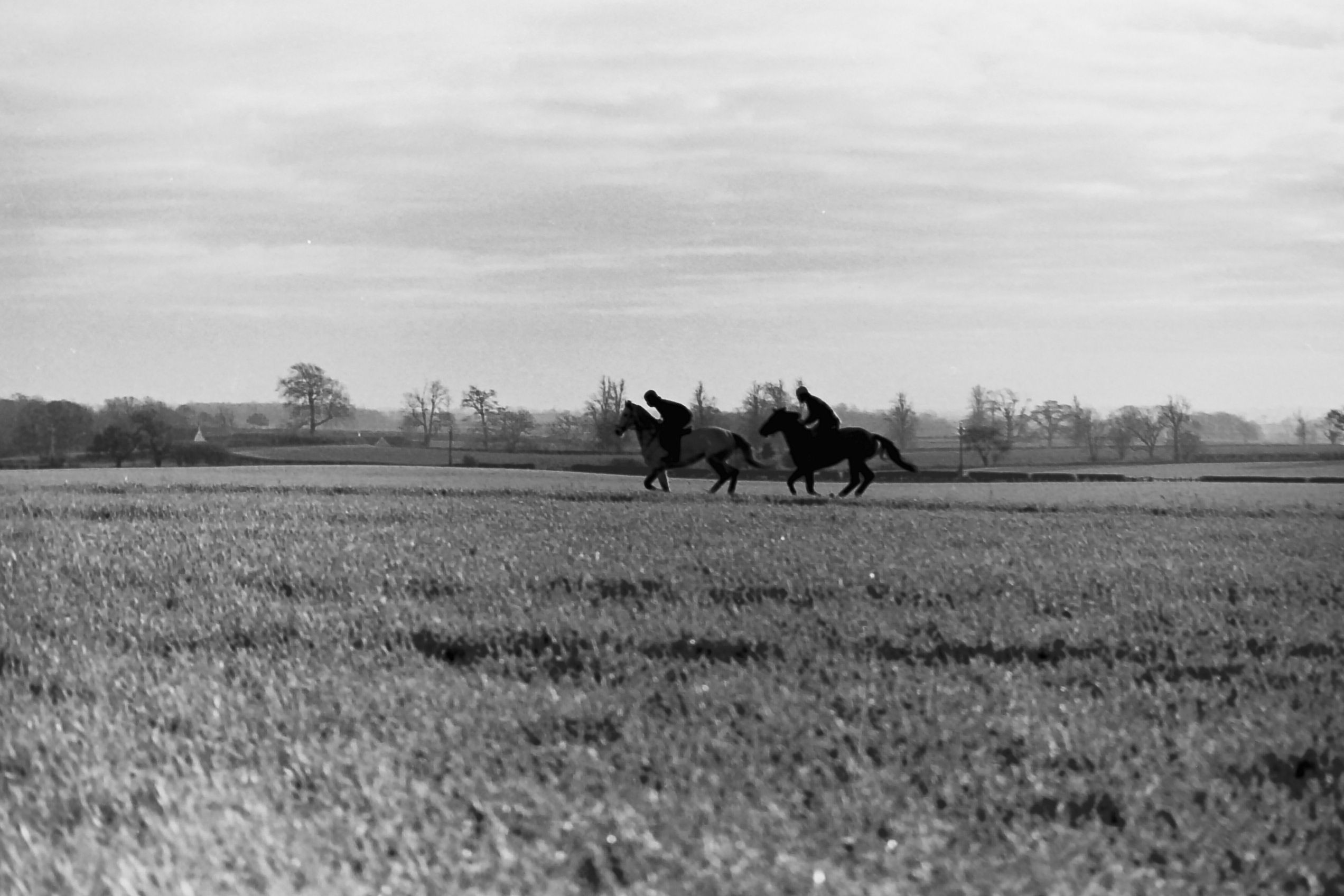
Horses training in 1990

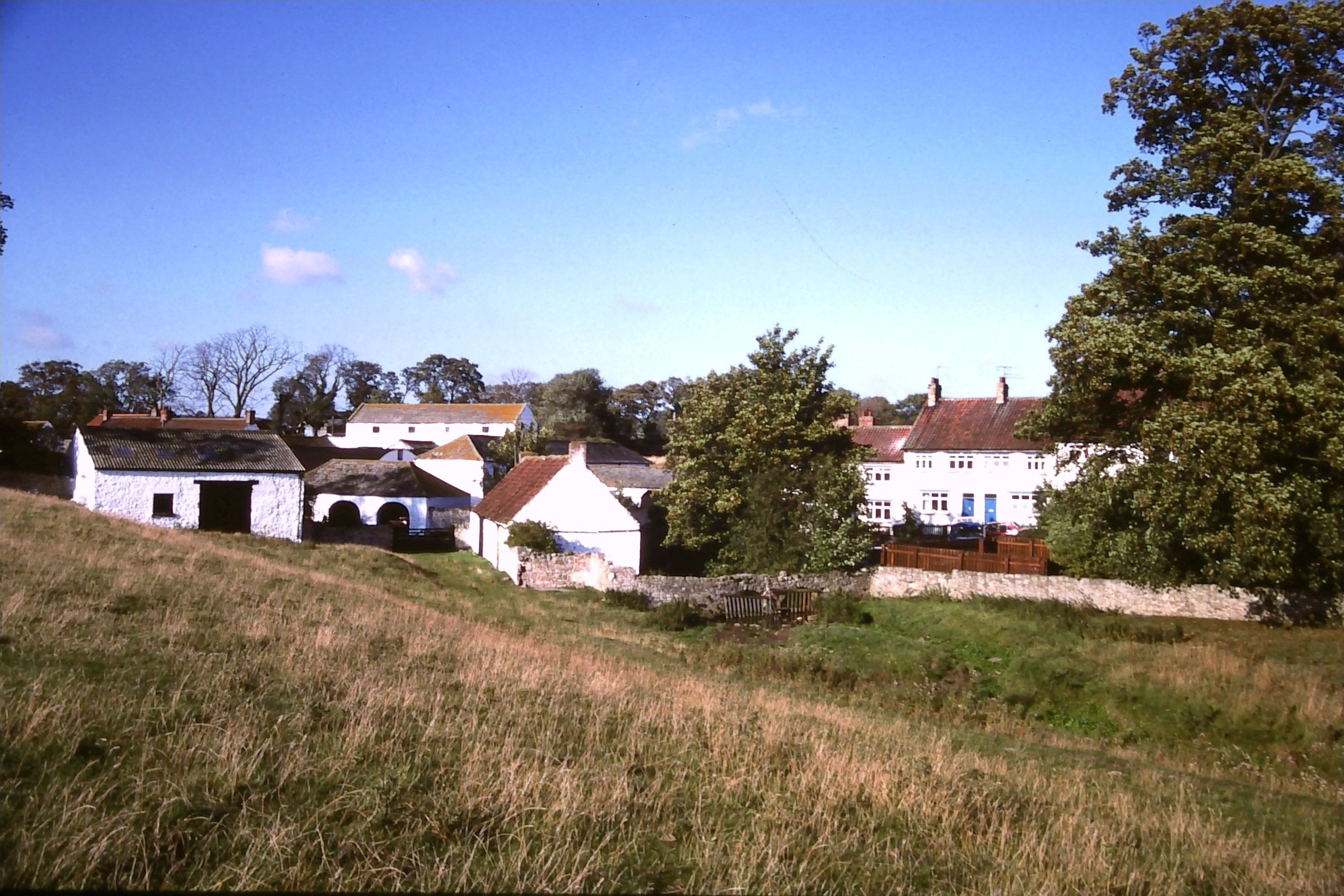
Denton Village 1990

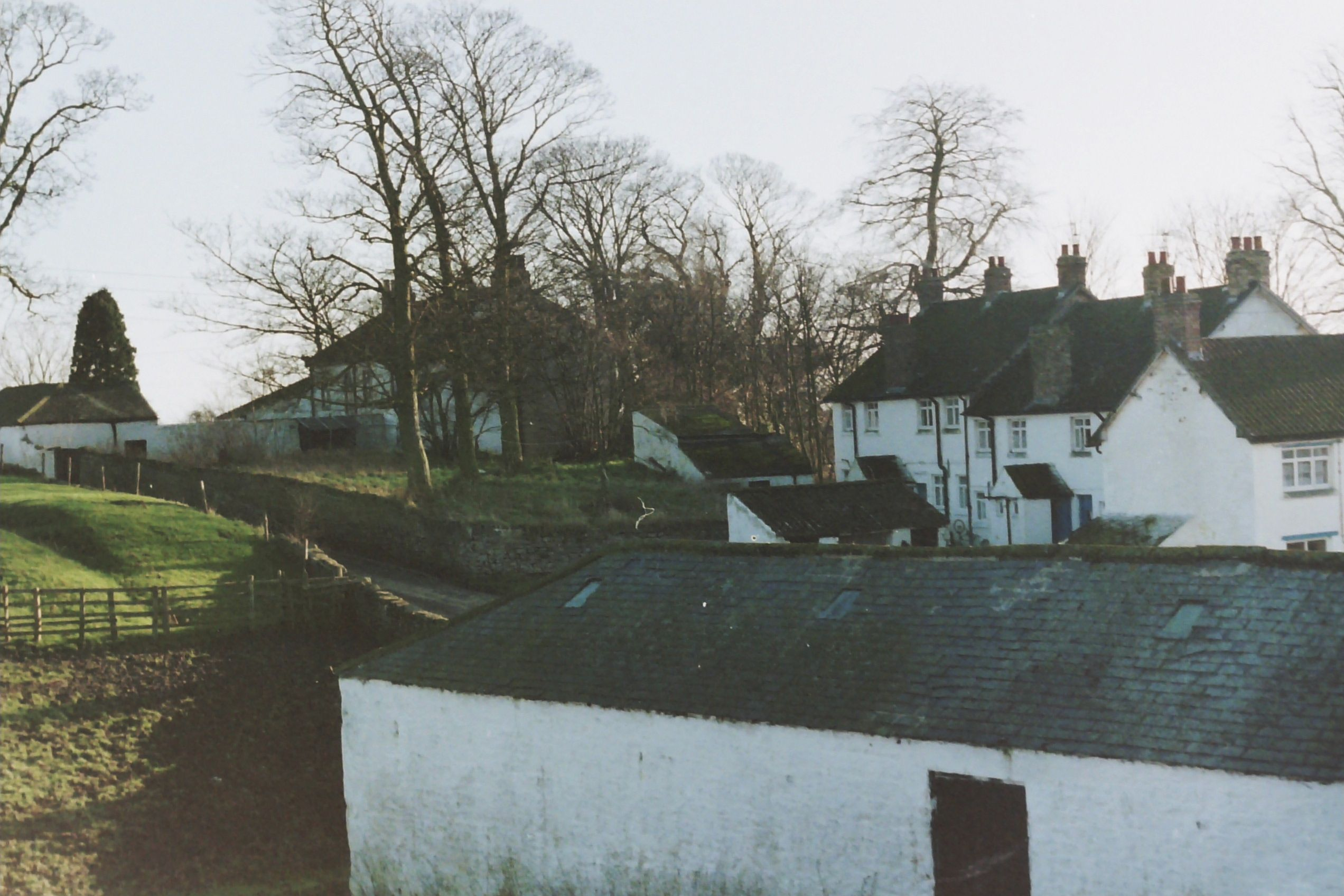
Denton Village 1990

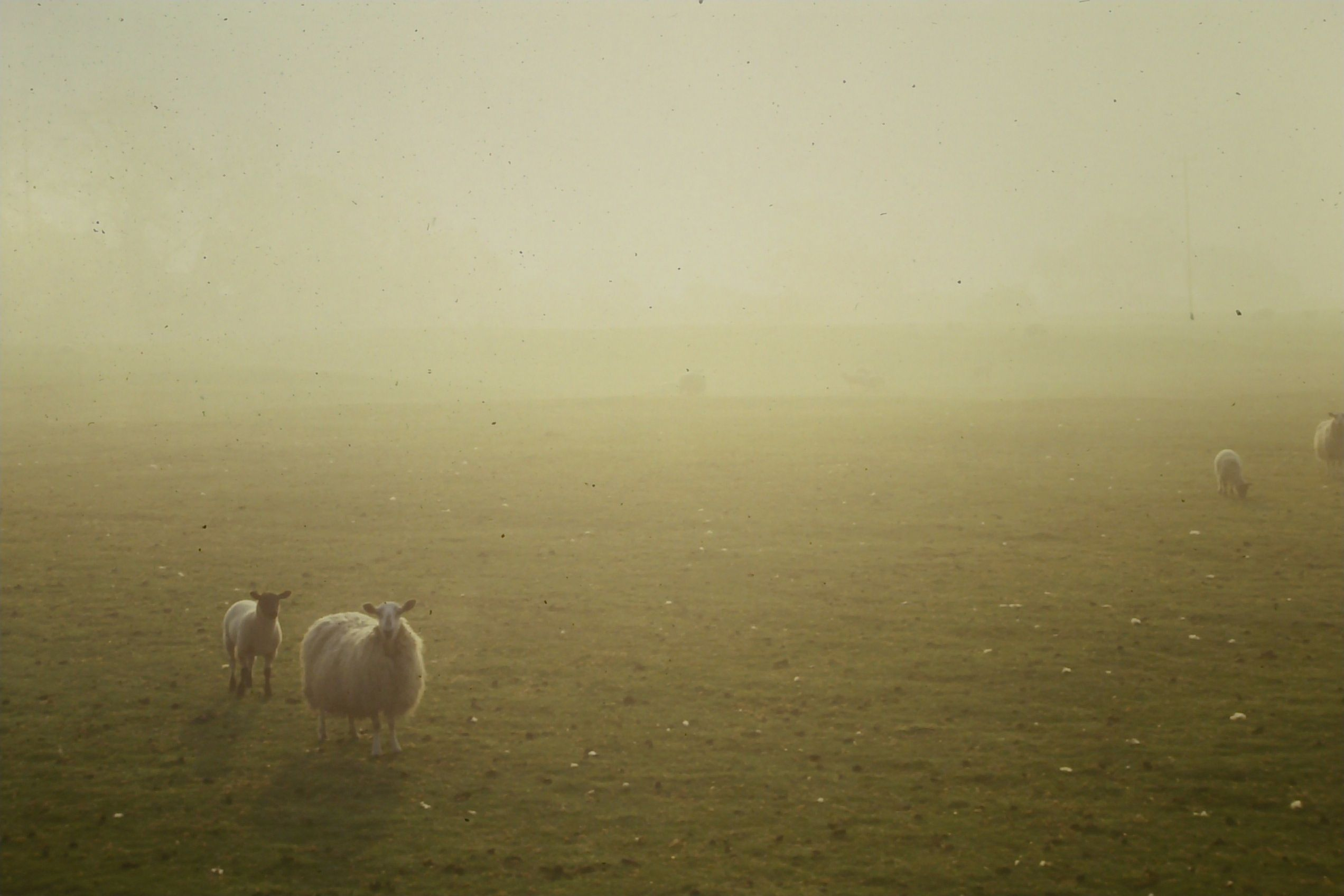
Foggy day in Denton 1990

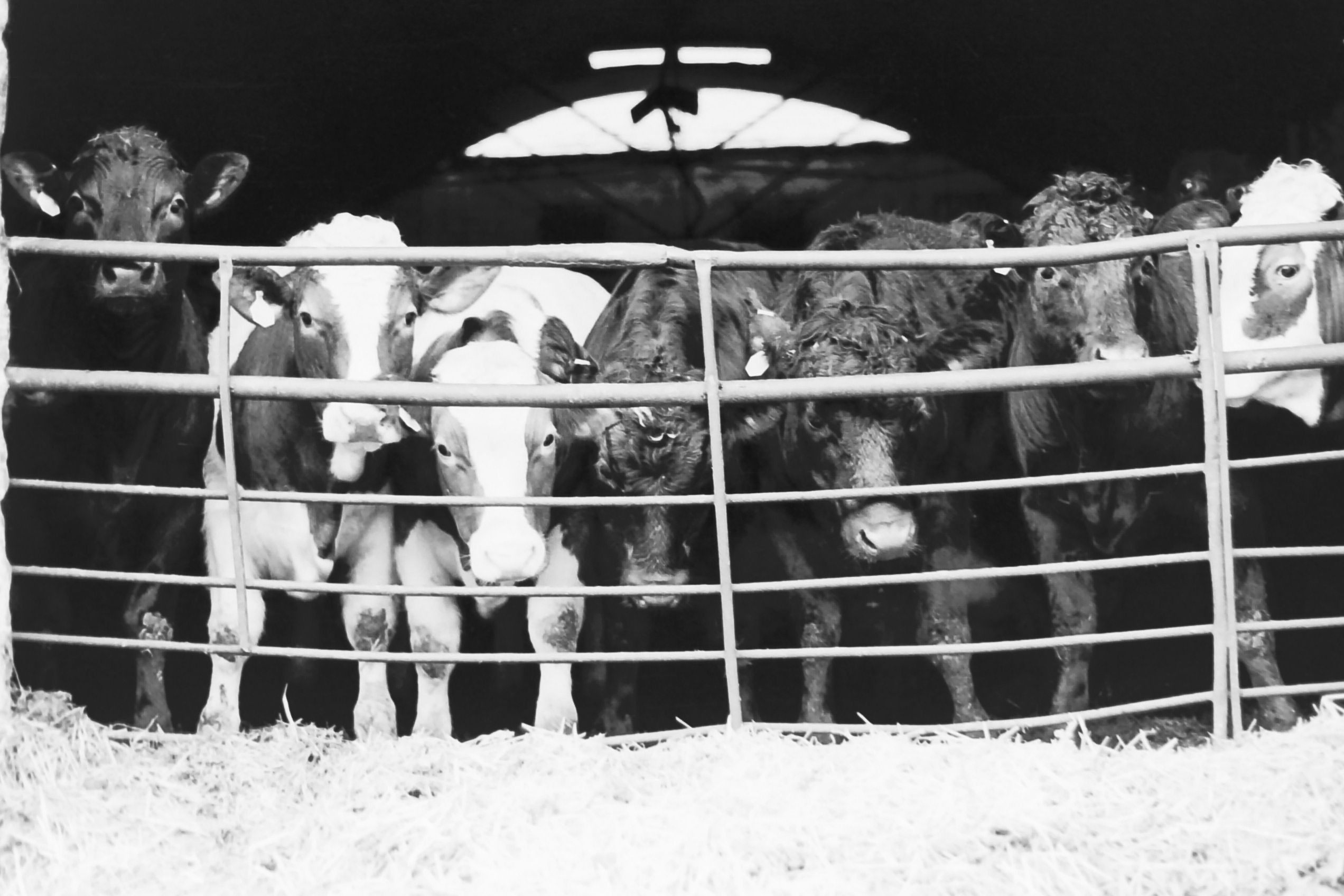
Livestock

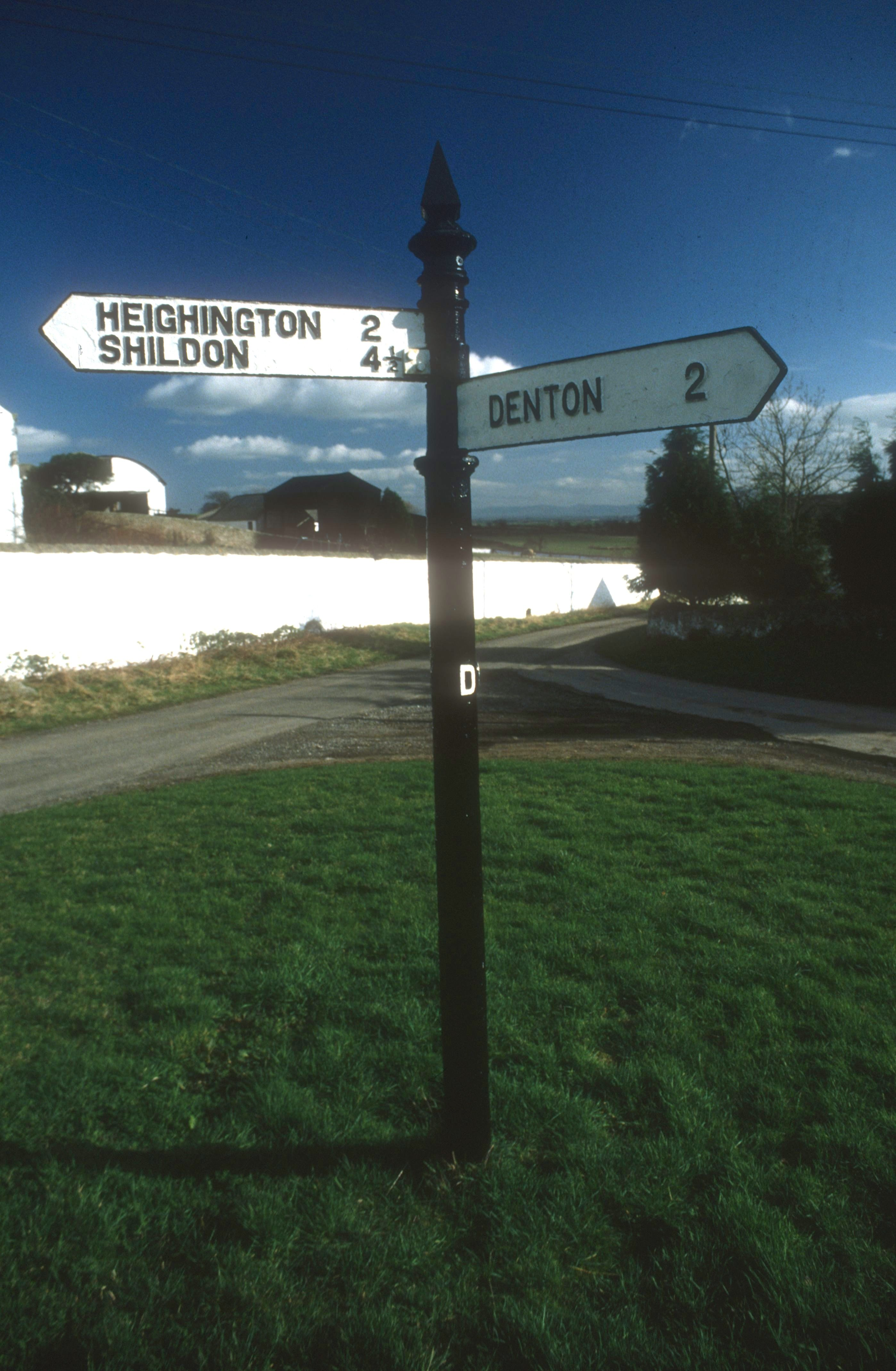
Sign post in Houghton-Le-Side

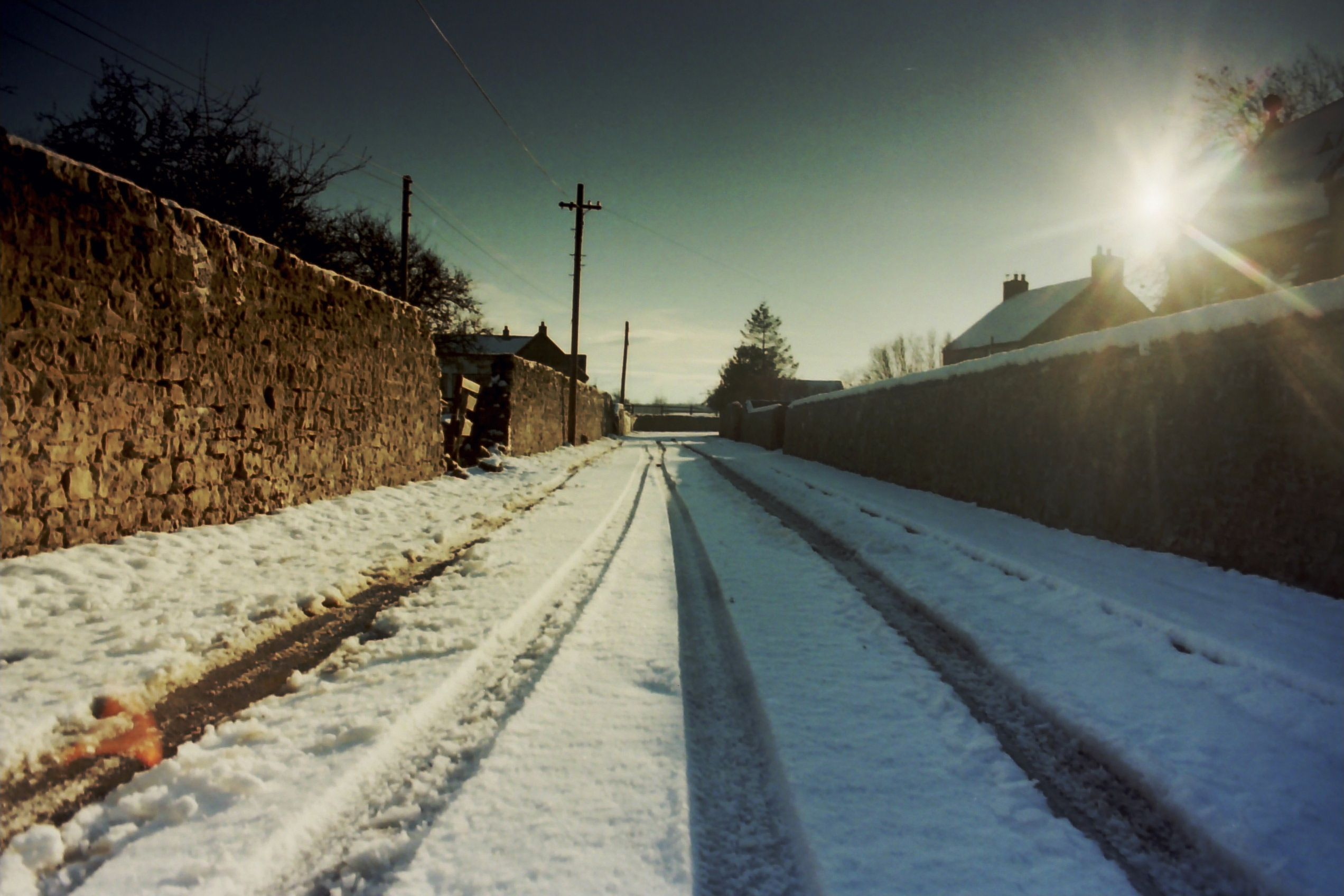
Church Lane, Denton

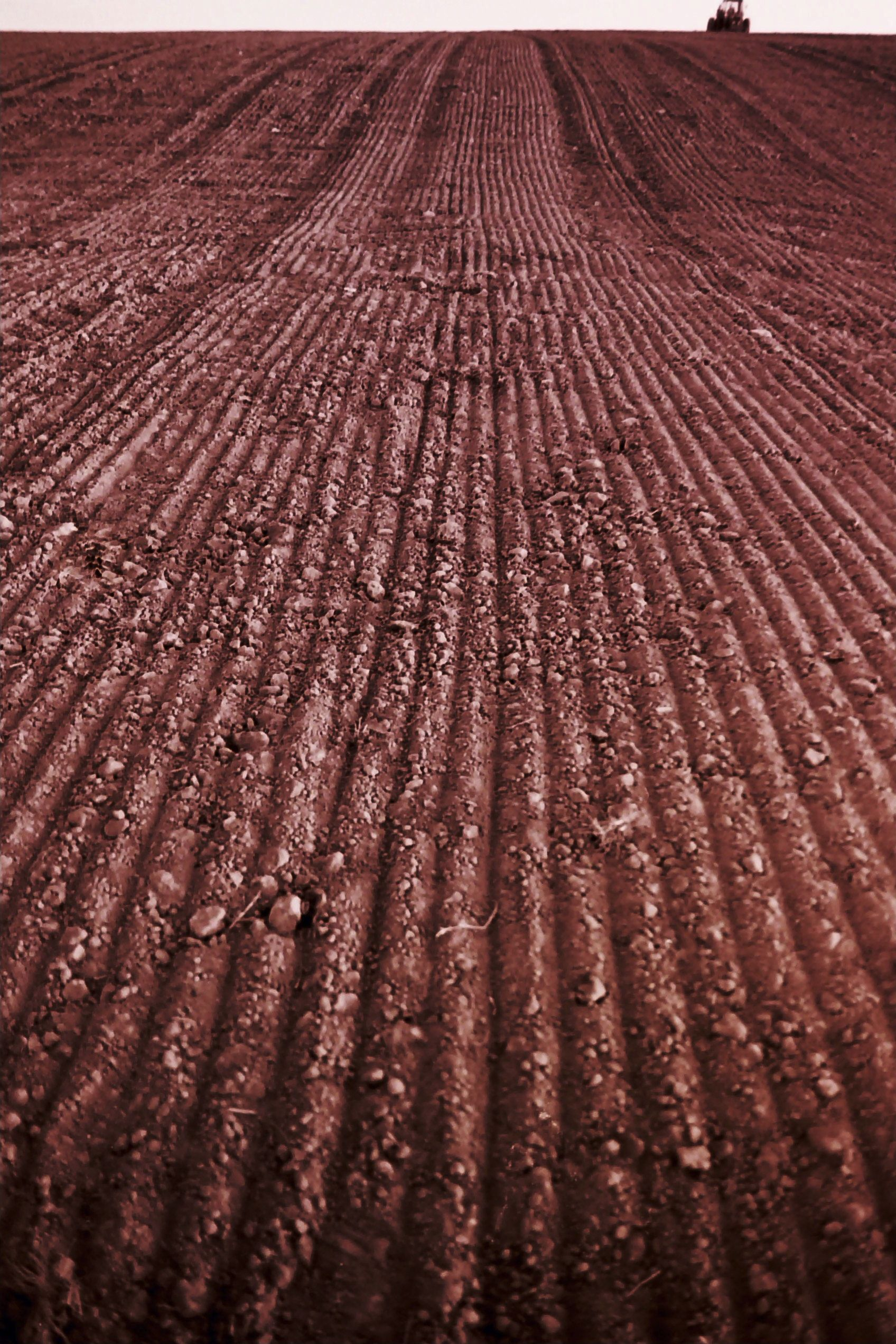
Rolled field, Denton

== Church history ==
"Denton, it is believed, has had no less than four chapels at various periods, each one having to be replaced on account of the ruinous state it was allowed to fall into. The first chapel is supposed to have been of Norman Foundation, which gave place to an Early English edifice, this being entirely rebuilt in 1810, and of no particular style. During the rebuilding, an ancient stone coffin was discovered, supposed to be that of a Knight Templar, and later a cover of Frosterley Marble of the same shape, and about the same size, with a sculptured figure of a female carved upon it, was also found. The following inscription in Lombardian French runs round the cover, Hic gist Aubrey de Coynners sa compayn - Here lies the wife of Aubrey de Conyers. The present chapel is a neat stone building in the Early English style, consisting of nave and chancel, with a south porsh at the west end. The chancel fittings and pulpit are of oak and of good design. The chapel is built almost on the site of its predecessor, and will seat 100, having been built at a cost of £1400."

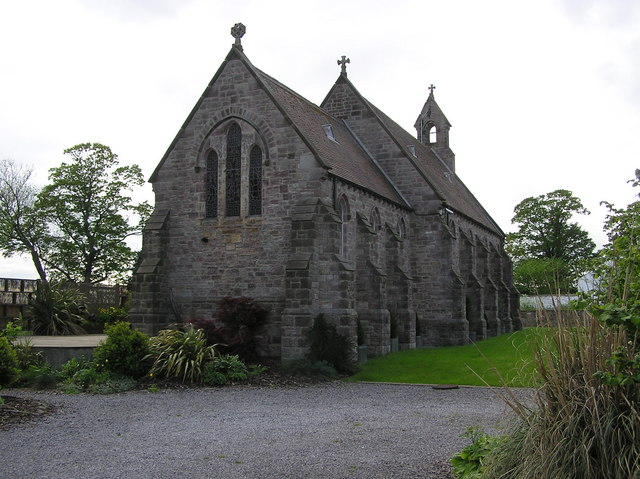
St Mary's Church, Denton
