= Faverdale =

Coordinates: 54.544°N 1.574°W

- Location within County Durham
- Population: 2,985 (2011.ward)
- OS grid reference: NZ276166
- Unitary authority: Darlington
- Ceremonial county: County Durham
- Region: North East
- Country: England
- Sovereign state: United Kingdom
- Post town: DARLINGTON
- Postcode district: DL3
- Police: Durham
- Fire: County Durham and Darlington
- Ambulance: North East

Faverdale is a suburb of Darlington in County Durham, England. It is situated in the north west of Darlington, north of Cockerton. The area was rural until the 20th century, a large wagon works was established in the 1920s, with housing development starting at the same time. The wagon works closed in the 1960s and further industrial and commercial development took place expanding from the brownfield site. As of 2012 the area has a mixture of industrial, residential and rural land use.

== Geography ==
The modern suburb is bounded by the former Stockton and Darlington Railway (now part of the Tees Valley Line, also known as the Bishop Auckland branch line) to the east, and by the defunct Darlington and Barnard Castle Railway (later known as 'Darlington & Tebay branch') to the south. The A1(M) road marks the extreme western fringe of the area. The area is between 50 and 85 m (164 and 279 ft) above sea level.

As of 2012 the area contain a mixture of housing (southwest), industrial estates (southeast), and farmland (north). Faverdale is also a ward of Darlington Borough Council.

== History ==
There is evidence for prehistoric, Iron Age and medieval activity at Faverdale. In the early 2000s evidence of occupation in the early Romano-British period was discovered – a complex of Roman-style buildings, including a two-room building heated by a hypocaust and with painted wall plaster. The complex probably included a residential villa in an area that has now been completely ploughed out. The settlement was the site of an enterprise manufacturing mortaria and probably other coarse wares; the mortaria are stamped with the name ANAVS and most known examples are from the fort at Coria near Hadrian's Wall. The pottery enterprise may have started as early as the decade 110-120, shortly before the construction of the Wall itself. Evidence of textile working, smithing, and bronze working was also found. ANAVS himself is likely to have been an immigrant, not a native of the area. The importation of Samian pottery to the site peaked 135-150, and the hypocaust was out of use by the end of the century.

The deserted medieval village of Whessoe was located on the northern fringe of the modern ward of Faverdale, between High Faverdale and Whessoe Grange farms; earthwork remains as well as medieval building remnants existed until demolition/bulldozing in the 1950s.

Up to the mid twentieth century the area was completely rural; there were dwellings at Faverdale House (or Hall, plus farms at Middle and High Faverdale), (Note: The Hall dates to the 18th century, and was rebuilt in the 1897, it is enveloped by the Faverdale Industrial estate (2001).) Cockerton Grange, and Rise Carr. Up to 1915 it was part of the Cockerton civil parish, after which it became part of Darlington.

The area began to be developed industrially in the interwar period. The Faverdale Wagon Works was established in the 1920, to produce freight wagons for the NER, the first housing estate in Faverdale was built to the west of the works beyond Faverdale Road (Westgate Crescent). A chemical works (Darlington Chemical & Insulating Co Ltd) was established in the south west of Faverdale, next to the Barnard Castle railway line, and south and west of the wagon works and housing. (Note: Darlington Chemical & Insulating Co Ltd, also known as Darchem, manufactured inorganic insulating materials, manufacture resulted in contamination of land, including asbestos. The land was re-claimed for housing/park land in the 2000s.)

The Faverdale Wagon Works closed in 1962 as a result of the Beeching cuts. The wagon works site was later redeveloped for other industrial uses (Faverdale Industrial Estate). Housing development west of Faverdale road also expanded during the late 20th century. In the first decade of the 21st century the former Darlington Chemical site and adjacent farmland was redeveloped, creating a 49 acres (0.20 km^{2}) municipal estate "West Park", including housing, parkland, a hospital (West Park Hospital), and a school.

In 2004 Argos began development of a large 730,000 sq ft (68,000 m^{2}) distribution centre the Faverdale industrial estate. The building was officially opened by Prime Minister Tony Blair in December 2005.

=== Future ===
An additional commercial development, a 60 acres (0.24 km^{2}) industrial and logistics park, "Faverdale 58", proposed by St. Modwen Properties in 2008, is at a planning stage; the site is located west of the Bishop Auckland branch line, with potential rail access. The development was on hold in 2011 due to economic downturn.

== Faverdale Wagon Works ==
In 1920 the Cleveland Bridge & Engineering Company began constructing a wagon works, the 'Faverdale Wagon Works', for the NER. The first wagon was manufactured in 1923. 200 houses were also constructed at the same time for the workers. The centenary of the Stockton and Darlington Railway was celebrated at the Faverdale works in 1925.

Initially the Faverdale wagon works manufactured wooden-bodied, wooden-framed wagons; steel-framed wagons began production in the 1930s. At its peak in the 1950s the Faverdale Wagon Works employed 550 people, the factory was a pioneer of mass production techniques for wagon building. A report of 1959 recommended the ceasing of manufacturing at the site, with it being retained for repair work, however after centralisation of control of rolling stock works in 1962, the 1963 ' Workshops Plan' recommended closure in 1963. The works closed 29 June 1963 with 366 jobs lost. The site was sold to Darlington Corporation in 1963 for £125,000.
