= Mowden, County Durham =

Area of Darlington, England

Coordinates: 54.534°N 1.5934°W

Mowden
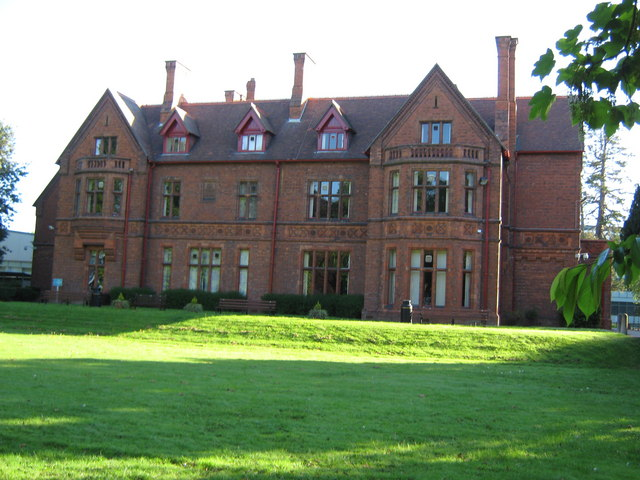
- Mowden Hall

- Location within County Durham
- Population: 3,708 (2011)
- OS grid reference: NZ264154
- Unitary authority: Darlington
- Ceremonial county: County Durham
- Region: North East
- Country: England
- Sovereign state: United Kingdom
- Post town: DARLINGTON
- Postcode district: DL3
- Dialling code: 01325
- Police: Durham
- Fire: County Durham and Darlington
- Ambulance: North East
- UK Parliament: Darlington

Mowden is an area of west Darlington in the Borough of Darlington, County Durham, England. Nearby areas include Hummersknott to the south, Branksome to the north and Cockerton to the north-east.

Houses here date back to the 1960s. The area has a pre-school, primary school, a row shops and two local pubs, the Mowden and the Model T.

== Former rugby ground ==
Mowden was previously home to Darlington Mowden Park Rugby Club. In late 2012, the Club sold their ground at Yiewsley Drive to a housing developer and relocated to The Darlington Arena, a 25,000 all-seater stadium which was previously owned by Darlington Football Club.

== Mowden Hall ==
Mowden Hall is a Victorian house designed by Alfred Waterhouse for the Pease family; it is located on Staindrop Road. The hall was one of many large houses built for notable Quaker families in Darlington, another example being Polam Hall (now home to Polam Hall School). John Beaumont Pease bought the farmland in the 1840s on which Mowden Hall stands and demolished the farm in 1862. He tried to make it private grounds by diverting an ancient footpath to High Coniscliffe. After his death, his son Edwin Lucas Pease continued to block the footpath, angering local people. He had promised to unblock the path. However, it was not, with a second path also being diverted. In 1875, a protest was held at the Mechanics Institute, which resulted in councillors, mayors, solicitors and ramblers forming the Darlington Footpaths Preservation Society. A court battle went to the court of Queen's Bench in London, between Edwin Pease and the Society over the legality of his actions. The court ruled in favour of Pease, who used the monetary award to extend Mowden Hall in size. The Pease family owned the property until the 1920s. Edwin's son William Edwin Pease never married and Mowden Hall was inherited by a cousin Ernest Pease, who sold it in 1927 and moved to the Isle of Wight due to ill health.

Mowden Hall School was founded at the hall in 1935 but pupils were forced to evacuate during World War II to Stocksfield in Northumberland. The hall switched hands several times before being sold to the government in 1966. The main occupier was the Department for Education (and its predecessor agencies) and the Teachers' Pensions Agency. They moved out to new premises in the town in 2015. The hall reverted to usage as a school, Marchbank Free School for special needs children with socio-emotional and behavioural problems.; the office buildings on the site were demolished and replaced with housing.

== Gallery ==
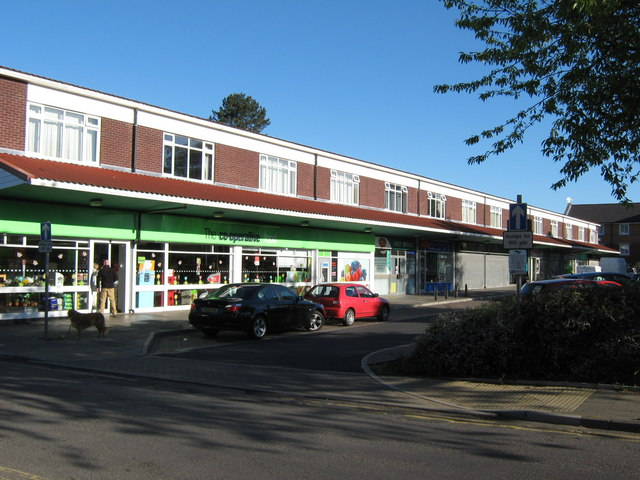
Mowden Shops

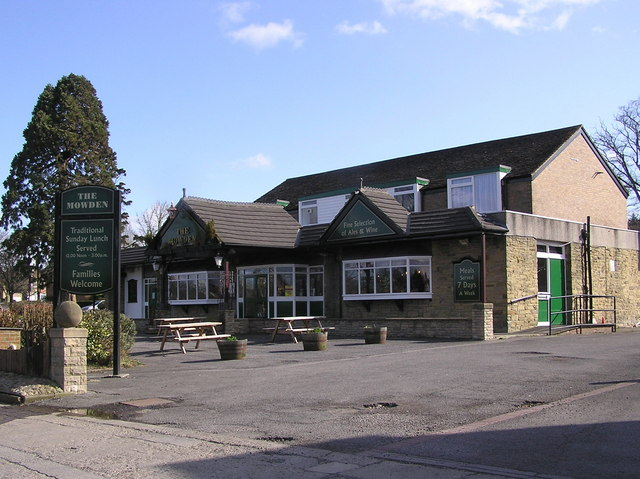
the Mowden public house

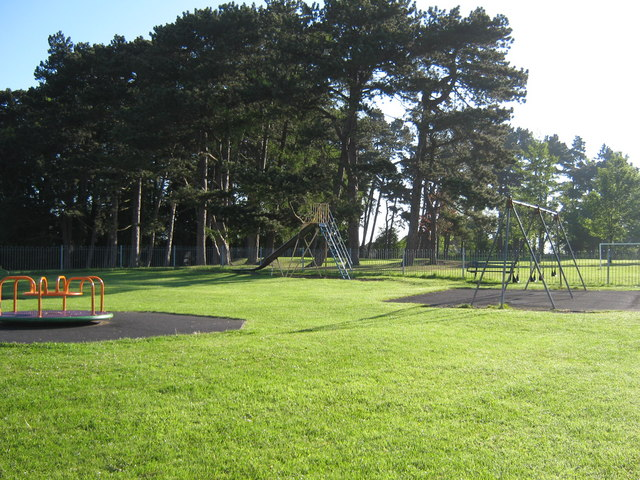
Bushel Hill Park
