= Thomas Holt (English architect) =

English architect (c. 1578–1624)

Thomas Holt (c. 1578 – 1624) was an English architect who designed a number of buildings at the University of Oxford.

Holt, a master carpenter and architect from either Halifax or York, is notable for designing important works in Renaissance architecture built at Oxford. He worked on Wadham College, which was built between 1610 and 1613. As a master carpenter he was responsible for the hammerbeam roof of the Hall. From 1613, he designed the great quadrangle of the examination schools there, now part of the Bodleian Library, introducing some new architectural features. Holt completed the schools quadrangle in 1624, the year of his death. Other buildings at Oxford are ascribed to him with less certainty, though he probably prepared designs for many of them.

Holt is registered as a privileged person in the university, aged 40, on 30 October 1618; he is described as "Faberlignarius Coll. Novi". He died on 9 September 1624, and was buried in the churchyard of Holywell parish church, Oxford, where a monument was erected in his memory. His daughter married Samuel Radcliffe, principal of Brasenose College.

== Sources ==
Attribution

This article incorporates text from a publication now in the public domain: "Holt, Thomas". Dictionary of National Biography. London: Smith, Elder & Co. 1885–1900.

- Tyack, Geoffrey (1998). Oxford An Architectural Guide. Oxford & New York: Oxford University Press. pp. 88, 93, 101. ISBN 0-19-817423-3.
- Jackson, Thomas Graham (1893). Wadham College, Oxford: Its Foundation, Architecture and History, with an Account of the Family of Wadham and Their Seats in Somerset and Devon. Oxford & New York: Clarendon Press. p. 32. Jackson, T.G. https://books.google.co.uk/books/about/Wadham_College_Oxford.html?id=9JPTaOZoPkMC&redir_esc=y
