= West Park, Darlington =

Coordinates: 54.54450°N 1.58667°W

- Location within County Durham
- OS grid reference: NZ2683716661
- Unitary authority: Darlington
- Ceremonial county: County Durham
- Region: North East
- Country: England
- Sovereign state: United Kingdom
- Post town: DARLINGTON
- Postcode district: DL2
- Dialling code: 01325
- Police: Durham
- Fire: County Durham and Darlington
- Ambulance: North East
- UK Parliament: Darlington

West Park is an area of Darlington, in County Durham, England. The area covers 49 hectares (121 acres) of land,

It consists of:

- 37 hectare West Park Village: at least 700 residential properties, a mix of commercial properties, and other facilities.
- 12 hectare West Park Nature Reserve: the first new park to be created in Darlington in the last 100 years.
- A hospital West Park Hospital, opened 2004.
- A school, 'West Park Academy', opened 2005.

The West Park development has won several national awards, including a Local Government Chronicle (LGC) Sustainable Communities Award, and a Royal Institution of Chartered Surveyors (RICS) Gold Award For Regeneration.

== Geography and demographic ==
West Park is located adjacent to the A68 and A1(M) junction 58, directly north of Cockerton. It is approximately 2.5 miles by road from the town centre.

As part of its status as a redevelopment project, West Park is built both on former greenfield land and brownfield land. Approximately half of the 49 hectares is developed on the former Darlington Chemical and Insulating ("Darchem") factory site, with the other half being farmland. The former Darchem site is now occupied by West Park A and the West Park Nature Reserve: the contaminated material has been removed from the site, with the exception of some low-level contamination which is successfully contained under a clay cap below the Nature Reserve.

The West Park development is within the council ward of Brinkburn & Faverdale. It is currently represented by Councillors Rebecca Baker (Lab), David Beckett (Lab) and Scott Durham (Con).

In terms of demographic, the ACORN (demographics) classification is type 25, suggesting white collar singles or sharers.

== Description ==
=== West Park Village ===
West Park Village consists of a small retail and commerce centre, with residential properties surrounding it.

The residential area of West Park is built around the edges of the West Park Nature Reserve. Initially, 700 properties were built, with a mixture of houses (3–5 bedrooms) and apartments (2 bedrooms). Streets are characterised by short front gardens with green iron railings; and mixed, predominantly red or buff brickwork houses. All houses have at least 1 parking space and 1 garage: these are located together on the house plot, or at a shared garage area. Two housebuilders were originally involved in designing and constructing the properties: Bussey & Armstrong, and Bellway; although Bussey & Armstrong are the primary developer, and are responsible for the concept and overall development. Some of the architecture is designed to reflect the traditional Darlington architectural styles. For example, Bussey & Armstrong made use of Arts and Crafts Movement architecture, popular at the time of the Quakers who influenced Darlington's development.

The residential area is roughly bisected by the West Park Nature Reserve, which consequently divides West Park into two residential sites: West Park A and West Park B. There are now many houses on the West Park A side. Within the West Park development, there is no road link between sites A and B. They are linked by a footpath through West Park Nature Reserve. The earlier site West Park A is located at the south-east edge of the Nature Reserve, and has street names based upon the railway pioneering Pease family. The later site West Park B is located at the north-west edge of the Nature Reserve, and has street names based upon Darlington's agricultural heritage.

==== Commercial and retail ====
Tillage Green is a square at the centre of West Park Village. On the perimeter of the square are local facilities including: a Cooperative store; Cactus Cafe; Cooplands bakery; a pub, "The White Heifer That Travelled"; a chemist; a hairdressing salon; and a dental surgery "Smile@Westpark". In 2018, Aldi and Marks and Spencer opened stores adjacent to Tillage Green. The Tillage Green commercial properties, and the apartments above it, were built by the Bussey & Armstrong development company. Adjacent to Tillage Green is West Park Academy, a primary school. This is a £3 million re-build of the former Alderman Leach primary school, originally located just south of West Park, off Bates Avenue near Cockerton.

=== West Park Nature Reserve ===
West Park Nature Reserve is one of 20 parks in Darlington. 8 of the parks, including West Park, are classed as "Local Nature Reserves", with a focus on providing a habitat for wildlife. The nature reserve is built in the form of an artificial hill, with paths leading through mixed woodland and grassland, up to an elevated point at the centre of the hill.

The wildlife includes some rare species such as Water vole, Dingy Skipper butterfly, and Ringed plover. There is a mix of different planting areas in the nature reserve including: Wildflower meadows (over 6 hectares, i.e. approximately 50%), Wetland, Woodland.

Community involvement between West Park residents and the West Park Nature Reserve is achieved through the Friends of West Park residents' group. Any West Park resident is entitled to join the Friends group. The Friends, with the backing of Council resources such as the Ranger service, organise events to take place on the nature reserve. These are open to all, but especially aimed at residents of West Park. Previous events include an Easter Egg hunt, a Halloween walk, and a summer Activity Day.

==== Artwork ====
There are several pieces of art within the nature reserve. These include stone sculptures, Corten steel sculptures, and bridges. The artist is sculptor David Paton.

The artwork was commissioned in parallel with poetry and verse, based on Darlington's agricultural and industrial heritage. This verse appears on some of the artwork throughout the park. The agriculturally based and railway-based street names used in West Park Village are also linked to the verse, being created by the same poet (W.N. Herbert) as part of the West Park development plan.

==== West Park levy ====
All properties within West Park Village pay a yearly levy. This funds further developments within the nature reserve, at a level above that which the Council contributes to other similarly sized parks. In 2022, the West Park Levy cost was £164.30 (reduced to £82.15 for properties paying by direct debit for a select few properties, most have to pay the full amount), with any yearly increase limited to being index linked. Commitment to pay the levy is written into the deeds of all West Park properties. The levy is not collected by Darlington Borough Council, but instead by an independent charitable organisation The West Park Levy Trust. The charity maintains the levy within a fund. Spending of the fund is determined entirely by a local steering group, who include nominated West Park residents. Residents are elected to the steering group from the Friends of West Park residents' group.

==== Bike track ====
A BMX bike track has been built in the south west corner of the park.
