= List of crossings of the River Tees =

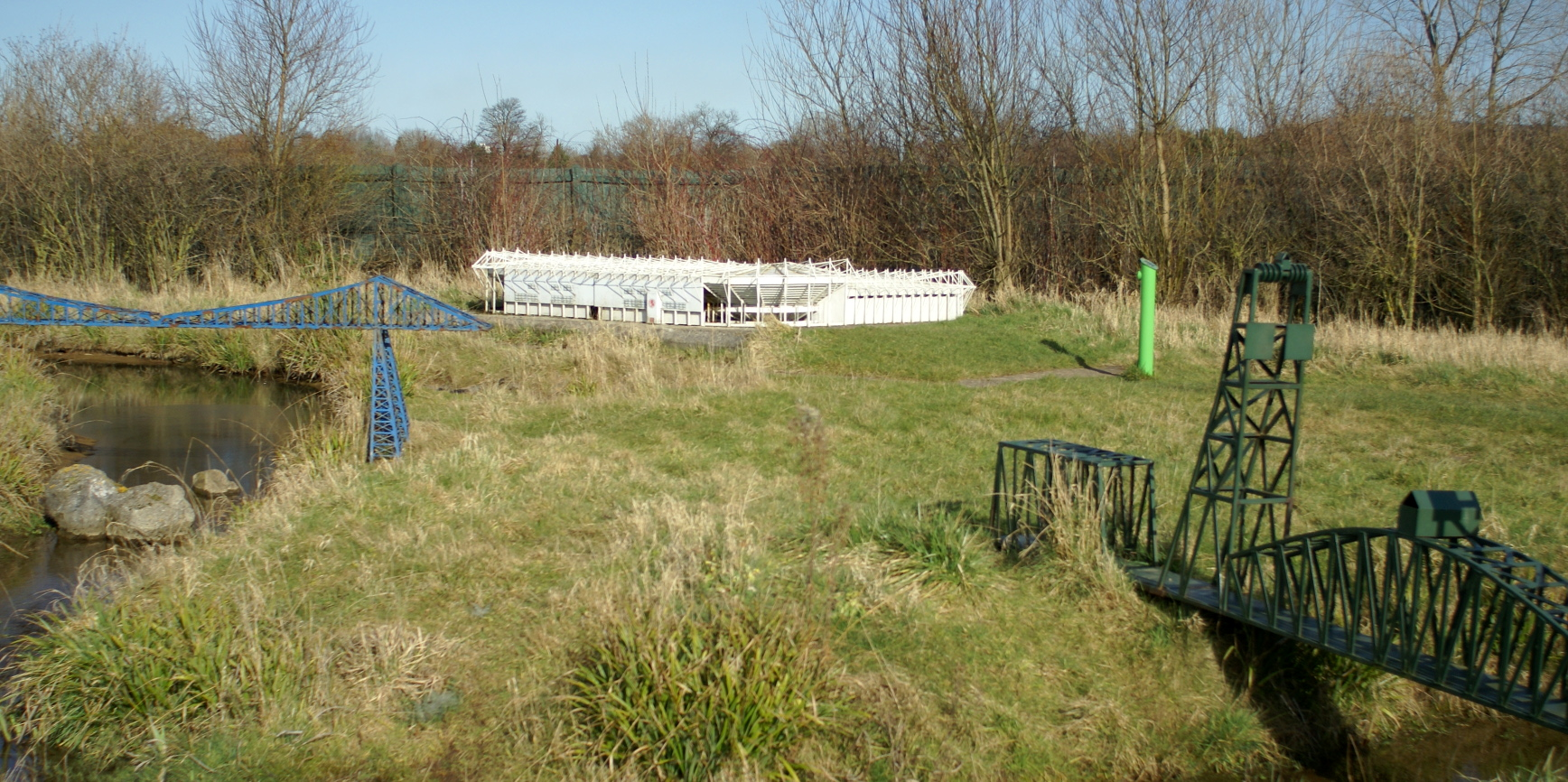
Model of the River Tees, in the former park "Natures World", in 2009, with models of Transporter Bridge (left) and Newport Bridge (right), with the Riverside Stadium in the centre

The River Tees forms the traditional border between Yorkshire and County Durham, passes through the Teesside Urban area built-up area, and has many crossings. The natural low-lying surrounding landscape, together with the development of shipping on the waterway, has led a number of unusual bridges being built.

== History of crossings ==
An early crossing of the Tees was made by the Romans, with the construction of a bridge at Piercebridge, along with a corresponding fortress. The bridge was built on the route of Dere Street, and as a result it likely saw a great deal of military traffic going between the fortress at York and the northern frontier. It was first built in wood around 90 AD, before being rebuilt in stone, possibly when the first bridge washed away. The use of the bridge may have continued into the sub-Roman period.

Crossings of the Tees continued to be important in the journey from north to south, and vice versa, along the east coast, during the medieval period. During the 13th century it was described as "the major obstacle to speedy travel out of the diocese of Durham southwards", with the contemporary fords, bridges and ferries proving particularly inconvenient in the winter period. This included the Great North Road, for which the Croft Bridge was built in the 13th or 14th centuries. Yarm Bridge was built around 1400, by bishop Skirlaw.

In 1771 a major flood on the Tees, along with others in the North-East, caused major damage to the river's bridges, completely destroying some. The Wynch Bridge, supposedly the oldest suspension bridge in Europe, dating from 1741, was lifted from its moorings. The bridge in Gilmonby was recorded as being destroyed after having only been fully operational for 3 years. On the other hand, The medieval Yarm Bridge was not affected by the flood, despite every other building in the town being damaged.

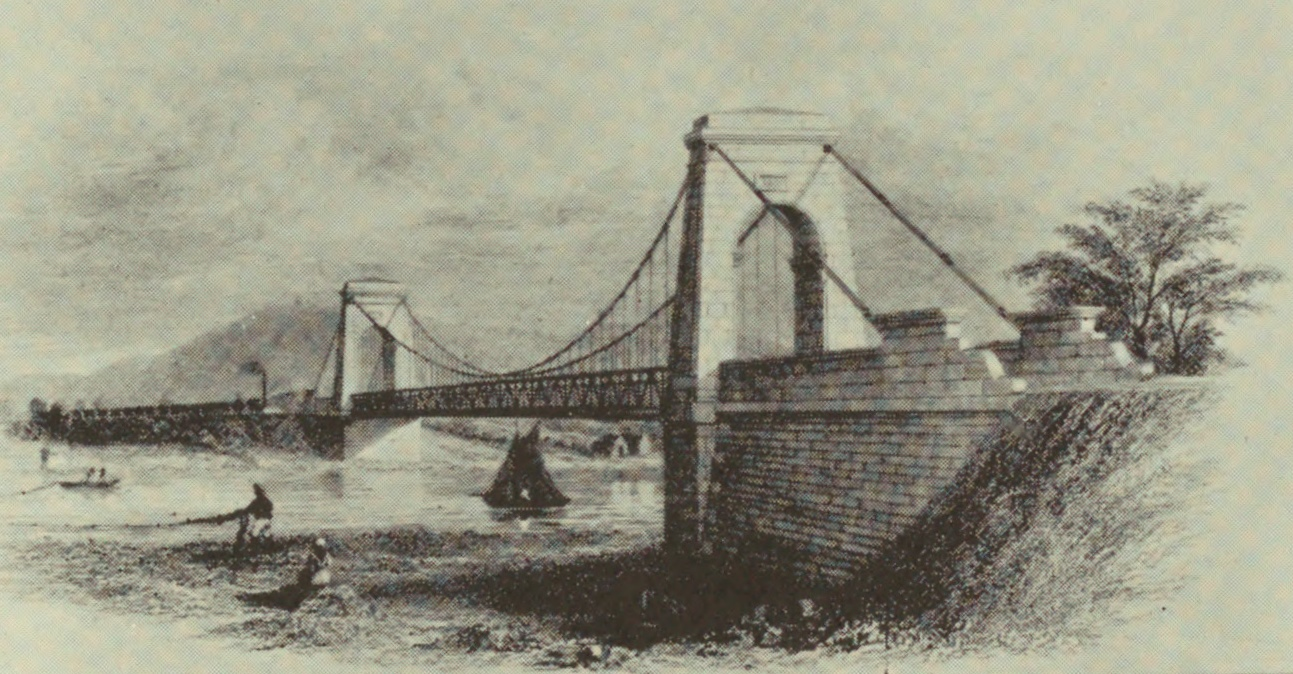
1830 illustration of the Stockton Railway Suspension Bridge, the first railway suspension bridge in the world, on the site of today's Surtees Rail Bridge.

With the industrialisation of the area through the 19th century, many new bridges where needed closer to the ports mouth. When the Stockton and Darlington railway, first opened in 1825, it was realised that the staiths at Stockton were too small to export the desired amount of coal. The decision was made to start exporting closer to the rivers mouth on the other bank, at Port Darlington (later Middlesbrough). This required the building of the first suspension railway bridge. (Note: Due to design flaws, this first bridge swayed far to much and had to be supported by wooden "Starlings". Even still the sway was so much that wagons had chained 9 meters apart so that weight was distributed evenly across the bridge.) This moved the commercial centre of gravity of Teesside further down stream, where many future bridges would be built.

By the end of that century there were 21 principal firms on and adjacent to the Tees in the Stockton and Thornaby area, with 36 firms in the Middlesbrough area. This led to the development of two of the most famous bridges on the river, The Transporter Bridge, in 1911, and the Newport Bridge, in 1934, both trying to balance the needs of travellers across the river with shipping up and down it.

== List ==
The following is a list of crossings of the River Tees, heading downstream, from source to its mouth in the North Sea. This includes road, rail, pipe and foot/cycle bridges and fords.

=== Source to Barnard Castle ===
Crossing	Photo	Opened	Notes	Coordinates
Moor House Bridge				54°41′57″N 2°22′23″W
Birkdale footbridge		1966	Just downstream from Cow Green reservoir.	54°39′13″N 2°17′23″W
Cronkley Bridge			Private road bridge	54°39′33″N 2°12′55″W
Holwick Head Bridge		1998	The first bridge built here was in 1844, by the Duke of Cleveland.	54°38′59″N 2°10′25″W
Wynch Bridge		1830	The original suspension bridge built on this spot was finished in 1741, was the first of its kind in Britain. That bridge was washed away in the Great Flood of 1771, with 2 more bridges being subsequently built there.	54°38′46″N 2°9′2″W
Scoberry Bridge		1971	A bridge on this site was originally built in 1881, by public subscription. That bridge was damaged by flooding in 1942 and closed. Eventually rebuilt in 1971. There has been some controversy over who is responsible for upkeep.	54°38′28″N 2°8′26″W
Middleton Bridge		1853	Replacing an earlier bridge, of 1811, which had collapsed before its completion. Consisting of one wide segmental arch, this bridge was under construction as early as 1810, using funds raised by public subscription. It now carries the B6277 road.	54°37′21″N 2°5′3″W
Beckstones Wath Footbridge		2002	Also known as the Millennium Bridge, built in response to campaign from residents in Eggleston and Mickleton, began in the 1980s. The opening ceremony was attended by Lord Barnard and Earl of Strathmore.	54°36′47″N 2°2′16″W
Eggleston Bridge		1450s	While incorporating parts of the original 15th century bridge, the structure as it now stands mostly dates to the 17th century. Carries the B6281 road.	54°36′15″N 2°0′24″W
Cotherstone Bridge		1932	This bridge is close to the point where the Balder meets the tees. A bridge on this site was destroyed in an 1881 flood.	54°34′38″N 1°58′51″W

=== Barnard Castle to Piercebridge ===
Crossing	Photo	Opened	Notes	Coordinates
Deepdale Aqueduct		1893	Also known as the "Silver Bridge" locally. A Victorian aqueduct, built for Stockton and Middlesbrough Waterboard by Head Wrightson, with a footpath on top. It was designed by the engineer, James Mansergh.	54°32′45″N 1°55′50″W
Barnard Castle Bridge		1569	Replacing a much older bridge of an unknown age, the gothic bridge, is also known as "County Bridge". Like many bridges on the Tees it was severely damaged by the 1771 flood, and was rebuilt. It now carries the A67 road.	54°32′34″N 1°55′38″W
Thorngate Footbridge		1882	Built to give access to the mills for textile workers. It was the second bridge on the site replacing a bridge that had been completed in the early 1870s. The first bridge, which was apparently cheaply built, collapsed in a storm in 1881, killing 2 onlookers. A second bridge was completed in 1882, but opened without ceremony.	54°32′21″N 1°55′33″W
Abbey Bridge		1773	Built for John Sawrey Morritt as one single span. There are two emplacements at the south end of the bridge which are the sites of former toll houses, which were built with battlements and ornamental arrow loops. These buildings where demolished in the second half of the 20th century.	54°31′47″N 1°53′57″W
Whorlton Bridge		July 1831	The bridge had been started at this location before October 1829, but a flood on the 13th of that month destroyed all progress. John Green of Newcastle was tasked with the redesign, which he based on his previous work on the Scotswood suspension bridge.	54°31′35″N 1°50′12″W
Winston Bridge		1763	Originally built as part of a toll road from Staindrop to Richmond, and now carries the B6274. Designed by armature architect Sir Thomas Robinson.	54°32′29″N 1°46′52″W
West Tees Railway Bridge		1856	Pair of railway viaducts built as part of the former Darlington and Barnard Castle Railway. The railway had to be rerouted, to avoid Lord Barnard's Selaby Hall. The original bridges where destroyed in a flood in 1855.	54°33′3″N 1°45′27″W
Gainford Railway Bridge	Twin_arches_of_the_old_Gainford_Rail_Bridge_-_geograph.org.uk_-_459177	1856	Pair of railway viaducts built as part of the former Darlington and Barnard Castle Railway. The railway had to be rerouted, to avoid Lord Barnard's Selaby Hall. The original bridges where destroyed in a flood in 1855.	54°32′52″N 1°44′47″W
Barforth Hall Bridge		1953	Built by a farmer to access a field, but over the years came to be used by the homeowners of Barforth Hall. A pier collapsed in 2002, and the bridge continued to deteriorate, with a dispute arising in 2009 about who owned the bridge, and who had the responsibility to upkeep it.	54°32′43″N 1°44′42″W

=== Piercebridge to Yarm ===
Crossing	Photo	Opened	Notes	Coordinates
Piercebridge Pipe Bridge		1956	water pipe	54°32′7″N 1°41′19″W
Piercebridge Bridge		16th century	The outer arches date to the 16th century, with central arch dated to 1673. The bridge was widened in 1789.	54°32′5″N 1°40′33″W
A1(M) Bridge, Low Coniscliffe	Teesdale Way approaching the Great North Road	1961	Built in 1961, in advance of the A1(M) Darlington bypass, which opened in 1965. As the part of the road around the river largely follows the alignment of the former Merrybent and Darlington Railway, this bridge is sited at the location of a former railway bridge, which had been destroyed by fire in 1952.	54°30′55″N 1°37′18″W
Blackwell Bridge		1832	Formerly carried the Great North Road, now carries the A66. Designed by John Green, it was his first masonry bridge. It was widened in 1961.	54°30′29″N 1°35′3″W
Croft Bridge		15th century	A167 road	54°28′59″N 1°33′16″W
Croft Viaduct		1840	East Coast Main Line	54°28′38″N 1°33′10″W
Low Hail Bridge		1879	A privately owned bridge originally built to carry sewage to a treatment plant, that has since closed. Designed by civil engineer Robert Robinson, to an American design, it was completed in 1879.	54°29′7″N 1°31′20″W
Neasham Hall Bridge		1909	Built for industrialist and politician Thomas Wrightson, to connect his country house, Sockburn Hall (also known as Neasham Hall), to the church in Eryholme, without having to use the existing ford.	54°28′42″N 1°29′56″W
Girsby Bridge		1870	The owner of the land around the All Saints Church, Girsby, Theophania Blackett of Sockburn Hall, closed the church and the original wooden bridge near by, restricting both for her family's private use. Darlington Highway Board sued, and she was eventually forced to restore access to the church by building a new bridge, completed in 1870.	54°28′7″N 1°27′31″W
Fishlocks Bridge		1987	Built by the local land owner to access his private land on either side of the river. Built on the site of an ancient ford, and down stream of a ferry. It was designed by Simpson Coulson and Partners, Stockton.	54°29′2″N 1°27′36″W
Over Dinsdale Bridge		1830s	The present deck of bridge dates from 1956, placed on top of the original stone columns. Before that it had been a toll-bridge operated by the Over Dinsdale Estate.	54°29′47″N 1°28′2″W

=== Yarm to the river mouth ===
Crossing	Photo	Opened	Notes	Coordinates
Yarm Viaduct		15 May 1852	North TransPennine Line	54°30′42″N 1°21′25″W
Yarm Bridge		1400s	A67 road	54°30′43″N 1°21′21″W
Preston Pipe Bridge		1959	Water pipe	54°32′2″N 1°19′23″W
Jubilee Bridge		20 Apr 2002	Carrying Queen Elizabeth Way	54°32′6″N 1°19′16″W
Surtees Bridge		3 Dec 2007	A66 road	54°33′16″N 1°18′39″W
Tees Bridge		1906	No longer used by trains	54°33′16″N 1°18′39″W
Surtees Rail Bridge		2009	Tees Valley Line	54°33′17″N 1°18′39″W
Victoria Bridge		20 Jun 1887	A1130 road	54°33′30″N 1°18′25″W
Teesquay Millennium Footbridge		20 Dec 2000	Footbridge	54°33′45″N 1°18′35″W
Princess of Wales Bridge		23 Sep 1992	Carrying Teesdale Boulevard	54°33′57″N 1°18′26″W
Infinity Bridge		16 May 2009	Foot and cycle	54°33′53″N 1°17′57″W
Tees Barrage		22 Apr 1995	Road, cycle and foot	54°33′52″N 1°17′10″W
Tees Viaduct		Nov 1975	A19 road	54°34′4″N 1°16′4″W
Tees Newport Bridge		28 Feb 1934	A1032 road	54°34′19″N 1°15′41″W
Middlesbrough Transporter Bridge		17 Oct 1911	A178 road	54°35′4″N 1°13′41″W

== See also ==
- Tees Railway Viaduct (1860–1971).
