= Barton, North Yorkshire =

Village and civil parish in North Yorkshire, England

Coordinates: 54.47454°N 1.64522°W

Barton
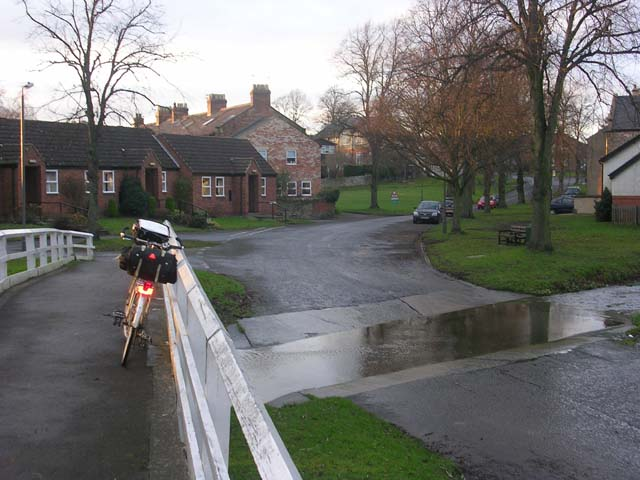
- A ford at Barton, near the village green.

- Location within North Yorkshire
- Population: 837 (2011 census)
- OS grid reference: NZ230088
- Unitary authority: North Yorkshire
- Ceremonial county: North Yorkshire
- Region: Yorkshire and the Humber
- Country: England
- Sovereign state: United Kingdom
- Post town: RICHMOND
- Postcode district: DL10
- Police: North Yorkshire
- Fire: North Yorkshire
- Ambulance: Yorkshire
- UK Parliament: Richmond and Northallerton

Barton is a village and civil parish in North Yorkshire, England. According to the 2011 census it had a population of 837. It is situated near the border with the ceremonial county of County Durham, and is 6 miles south-west of Darlington.

== History ==
The village is recorded as Bartun in the Domesday Book. At the time of the Norman invasion the manor was split between Earl Edwin and Ulf. Afterwards it was granted to Count Alan of Brittany. In turn he granted the manor to Godric, the steward. The manor was split, unified and then split again during the 13th century. At the time of Henry III, the manor was following the descent of Richmond. In 1227, part of the lands were granted to Richard of Cornwall and then to Peter de Brus, lord of Skelton. The manor was further split into mesne lordships, of which Roald of Richmond held one in 1286 and which then followed the descent of the Scropes of Bolton. Other parts of the manor were granted to William de Lancaster around 1235. By 1330 the lands had passed to the Mowbray family. When their direct descent ended in 1391, the manor was passed to the Ingleby's of Ripley. In 1579 this line too ended and the land passed to John Ward whose descendants via marriages included the Dodsworth and Killinghall families until 1762. The second part of the manor was passed to John de Huddleston around 1316. These eventually passed to the descendants of the manors of Barforth and Cleasby. The remaining mesne lordship was held Raplh, son of Ranulph of Richmond in 1268 and passed eventually to the Wandesford family and finally to the Dodsworths

The etymology of the name of the village is derived from the Old English phrase bere-tūn, initially meaning barley farm, but later came to mean a demesne farm or outlying grange.

== Governance ==
The village lies within the Richmond and Northallerton UK Parliament constituency. It also lies within the Richmondshire North electoral division of North Yorkshire Council. It was previously part of the Richmondshire district from 1974 to 2023. An electoral ward in the same name exists. This ward stretches north-east to Cleasby with a total population taken at the 2011 Census of 1,224.

== Geography ==
The village lies 1 mile (1.6 km) east of the old Roman road of Dere Street. The village of Newton Morrell is the closest to Barton at just 0.77 miles (1.24 km) to the north-east and Stapleton 2 miles (3.2 km) northward. Other settlements that are close by include Melsonby 2 miles (3.2 km) to the west, Middleton Tyas 1.7 miles (2.7 km) to the south and Aldbrough St John 2.4 miles (3.9 km) to the north-west. Barton Beck flows north through the centre of the village creating a ford across Mary Gate. It joins Clow Beck on the north side of the nearby A1(M) and is part of the tributary system of the River Tees.

== Demography ==
Population
| Year | 1881 | 1891 | 1901 | 1911 | 1921 | 1931 | 1951 | 1961 | 2001 | 2011 |
|---|---|---|---|---|---|---|---|---|---|---|
| Total | 515 | 410 | 517 | 558 | 553 | 575 | 540 | 505 | 880 | 837 |

=== 2001 census ===
The 2001 UK census showed that the population was split 47.8% male to 52.2% female. The religious constituency was made of 83.1% Christian, 0.3% Jewish, 0.6% Muslim and the rest stating no religion or not stating at all. The ethnic make-up was 98.9% White British, 0.5% Mixed ethnic and 0.7% White other. There were 376 dwellings.

=== 2011 census ===
The 2011 UK census showed that the population was split 48.4% male to 51.6% female. The religious constituency was made of 77.3% Christian, 0.1% Muslim and the rest stating no religion or not stating at all. The ethnic make-up was 98% White British, 0.1% Mixed ethnic, 0.1% British Asian, 0.1% British Black and 1% each White Other. There were 386 dwellings.

== Community and culture ==
Education in the village is provided by Barton CE Primary School. Pupils would then receive secondary education at Richmond School and Sixth Form College. There is a local village store incorporating a post office. The village is home to Barton Cricket Club who play at the playing fields on Church Lane. They compete in the Darlington and District League. The village used to have five pubs due to it being located on the old Great North Road; the Wheatsheaf, the King William IV, the Shoulder of Mutton, the Half Moon and the Voltigeur (named after a racehorse). By 2015, only one pub was left open, the Half Moon.

== Religion ==
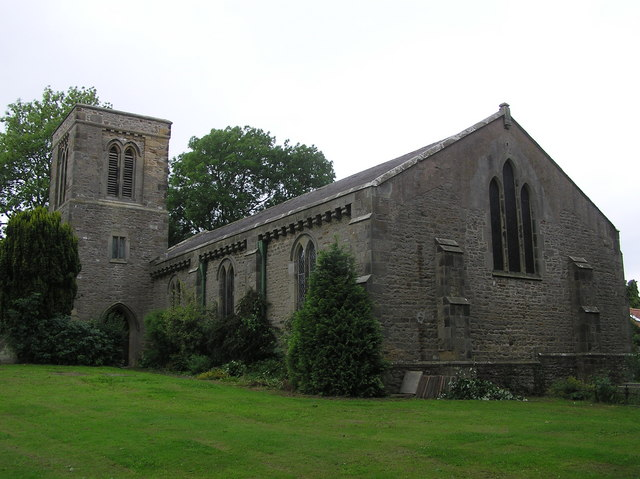
St Cuthbert and St Mary's Church

St Cuthbert and St Mary's Church is in the village, located on Church Lane. The Grade II listed building dates from 1840 when the two parishes of both the named Saints were brought together due to the ruinous state of both buildings. There is also a Methodist Chapel located in Chapel Row that was built in 1829 and repaired in 1878.

== See also ==
- Listed buildings in Barton, North Yorkshire
