= Croft Bridge =

Listed building in North Yorkshire, England

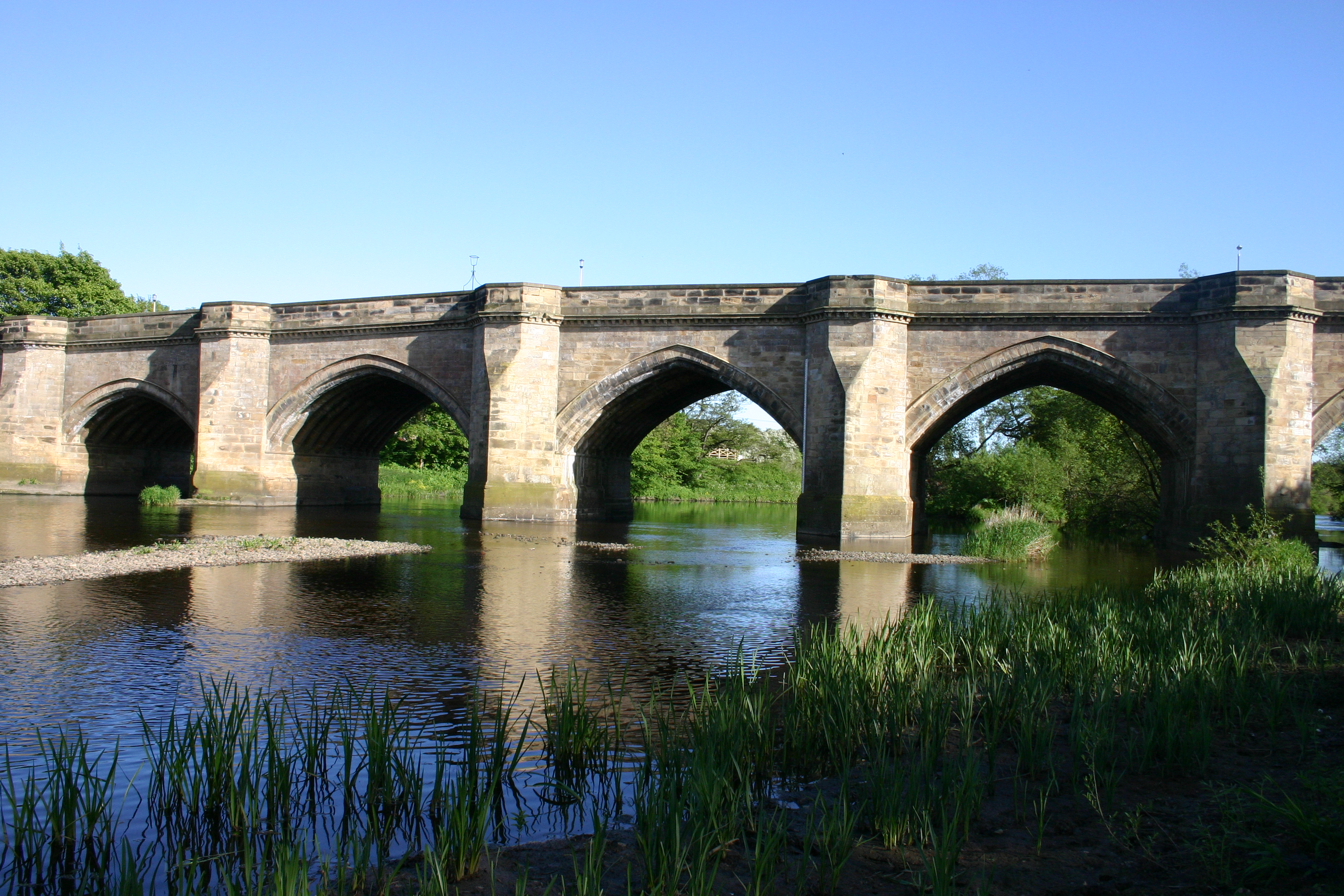
- Coordinates: 54.4830°N 1.5544°W
- OS grid reference: NZ289098
- Carries: A167 road
- Crosses: River Tees
- Locale: Hurworth, County Durham; Croft, North Yorkshire
- Heritage status: Grade I listed (Dual registered; see text)
- Historic England numbers: 1116440; 1131364
- Preceded by: Blackwell Bridge
- Followed by: Croft Viaduct

Characteristics
- Total length: 330 feet (100 m)

History
- Built: 14th century
- Rebuilt: 1795

Croft Bridge is a road bridge over the River Tees, straddling the border between North Yorkshire and County Durham, in the north of England. The road over the bridge is now the A167, previously a second branch of the Great North Road, meeting the old road in Darlington. The bridge dates back to Medieval times, and is the setting for the awarding of a sword to the incoming Bishop of Durham.

== History ==
The origins of the bridge are in the 14th century, with documents referring to a bridge at the site in 1356 and 1361, though it is possible that either a ford or a timber bridge pre-dated the stone bridge. A grant of pontage was made in 1356 for repairs to the bridge as it had been damaged by severe flooding. In 1531 it was described as being "...[a] grete bridge at Crofte, beinge of sixe myghte large pillars and of seven arches of stone worke..." Until the building of Blackwell Bridge in 1832 (further upstream) all traffic to the south from Darlington had to use Croft Bridge. It remained an important crossing point between Yorkshire and County Durham; in late 1569, Sir Ralph Sadler and the Earl of Sussex, both loyal to Elizabeth I, gathered their forces at the bridge to ride northwards during the Rising of the North campaign.

The bridge is 330 feet (100 m) long, and it has seven arches, each arch being pointed and ribbed, though six of these arches are narrow-ribbed, and the smallest arch is on the southern (Yorkshire) side. A blue stone is a used as a marker on the third pier, and is inscribed with the following; "DUN CONTRIBVAT NORTH RID. COM EBOR. ET COM DTUNEL STATV. APVD SESS. VTBQe GEN. PAK. AN. DO. 1673." Serious floods have the affected the bridge and its environs; in February 1753 severe flooding 15 feet (4.6 m) above the high-water mark caused the toll house to be swept away, taking £50 worth of toll-money with it, and in 1822, the water flooded the bridge to a depth of 15 feet (4.6 m) above its deck.

Over the years, as the bridge became ruinous and dilapidated, arguments broke out between local authorities about who should maintain the bridge. In 1673, it was decreed that the third pier outwards from the Durham side would be the boundary marker between the two sides, with each district being responsible for the part of the bridge within their boundary. This equates to 53 yards (48 m) on the Durham side, and 95 yards (87 m) on the Yorkshire side. In 1795, the width of the bridge was extended by 15 feet (4.6 m) on the upstream side by noted architect John Carr. For the use of the bridge, tolls were charged between 1745 and 1879, although the turnpike trust were not responsible for the bridge or for 300 feet (91 m) either side of it, which caused a case to be pursued through the courts when a traveller with carts used the bridge but turned off in Croft-on-Tees onto the Richmondshire road. Having done so, he at no point used the road which was the responsibility of the turnpike, though they felt he should have paid.

The river downstream of Croft Bridge has a different landscape to that upstream of the bridge; notwithstanding the industrial changes, but in pre-historic times, the valley below the bridge was subject to natural flooding from meltwater and also marine inundation. Now, the bridge carries the A167 road between Northallerton and Darlington. This was originally a branch of the Great North Road from York to Newcastle, which met up with the old A1 road just after it crossed Blackwell Bridge south of Darlington. The bridge has a footpath on either side, and the road carriageway is 24 feet (7.3 m) across.

The bridge is the setting for a handover whenever a new Bishop of Durham is elevated. The incoming bishop is greeted by the master of Sockburn manor with the falchion that was used to slay the Sockburn Worm. A few lines are said, and the bishop then gives the falchion back wishing the master of Sockburn, a long life, health and prosperity. The ceremony used to be held at Neasham which is nearer Sockburn, but the ford there has become unpassable even in low water. The ceremony was discontinued in 1826 when Durham ceased to be a Palatinate, but was revived by the investiture of John Habgood in 1973.

The bridge has two different listings with Historic England, both having Grade I listed status. The bridge at the County Durham side (Hurworth) was registered on 20 March 1967, and the Yorkshire side of the bridge, at Croft, was registered on 19 December 1951.

== See also ==
- Grade I listed buildings in North Yorkshire (district)
- Listed buildings in Croft-on-Tees
- List of crossings of the River Tees
