= Listed buildings in Stapleton-on-Tees =

Stapleton-on-Tees is a civil parish in the county of North Yorkshire, England. It contains three listed buildings that are recorded in the National Heritage List for England. All the listed buildings are designated at Grade II, the lowest of the three grades, which is applied to "buildings of national importance and special interest". The parish contains the village of Stapleton-on-Tees and the surrounding countryside, and the listed buildings consist of a bridge, a terrace of cottages, and a milepost.

== Buildings ==
Name and location	Photograph	Date	Notes
Willow Bridge; 54.48496°N 1.61760°W		Late 18th century (probable)	The bridge carries a disused road over Clow Beck. It is in rusticated stone and coursed red sandstone, and consists of a single segmental arch. There is a band below the parapet, and buttresses flanking the abutments, which end in circular bollards.
Terrace, The Green; 54.50383°N 1.59562°W		Early 19th century (probable)	A terrace of five cottages in brick, with a pantile roof and coped gables. There are two storeys and ten bays. To the right of the centre is a segmental-arched carriage entrance. On the front is a gabled porch, and the doorways have divided fanlights. The windows are a mix of casements and sashes, some horizontally sliding, and some windows are blind.
Milepost; 54.49534°N 1.60551°W		Late 19th century	The milepost opposite the northern end of the drive to Cleasby Grange is in cast iron. It has a triangular plan and a sloping top. On the top is inscribed "RICHMOND H.D.", on the sides are pointing hands, on the left side is the distance to Richmond, and on the right side the distance to Darlington.
