= Listed buildings in Barton, North Yorkshire =

Barton is a civil parish in the county of North Yorkshire, England. It contains six listed buildings that are recorded in the National Heritage List for England. All the listed buildings are designated at Grade II, the lowest of the three grades, which is applied to "buildings of national importance and special interest". The parish contains the village of Barton and the surrounding area, and the listed buildings consist of houses, a dovecote, a gateway, a table tomb and a church

== Buildings ==
Name and location	Photograph	Date	Notes
Dovecote; 54.47457°N 1.64561°W	—	Late 17th to early 18th century	The porch of a demolished building incorporating a dovecote, it is in sandstone, with quoins, and a coped clay tile roof. There is a single storey and a loft, and a single cell. On the east front is a square-headed doorway, over which are bird holes and ledges, and on the west side is a slit vent. Inside, on the west side, are nesting boxes at the upper level.
Barton Lodge; 54.47229°N 1.64286°W	—	18th century	The house, which was extended in the early to mid 19th century, is roughcast with a hipped Welsh slate roof, and has an L-shaped plan. The earlier part has three storeys and three bays, it contains sash windows with wedge lintels, and on the left return is a porch. The later part to the right has two storeys and three bays, and chamfered rusticated quoins. It contains a doorway converted into a window, with pilasters and an open segmental pediment. The other windows are sashes in architraves, those in the ground floor with cornices.
North Gateway, Middleton Lodge; 54.46195°N 1.66281°W		c. 1770	The gateway was designed by John Carr. Flanking the entrance to the drive are convex quadrant walls on a plinth, with moulded coping, ending in cylindrical bollards. The gates are in wrought iron with fleur-de-lys finials, and knob finials to the standards.
21, 23 and 25 Silver Street; 54.47424°N 1.64606°W	—	Late 18th century (probable)	Two, later three, houses in stone, with quoins, and a pantile roof with stone copings and shaped kneelers. There are two storeys and four bays. On the front are three doorways, and the windows are sashes or top-hung casements imitating sashes.
Table tomb 54.47191°N 1.64354°W	—	c. 1806	The table tomb is in the churchyard of a former church, and is in sandstone. It has a moulded top, the end panels have fluted corner columns and contain carved drapes on an urn, and on the side panel are inscriptions.
Church of St Cuthbert and St Mary; 54.47554°N 1.64576°W		1840–41	The church, which was rebuilt by Ignatius Bonomi, is in stone with Welsh slate roofs. It consists of a nave and a chancel in one unit, and a south tower incorporating a porch. The tower has three stages, and is unbuttressed. On the east side is a doorway with a pointed arch, a chamfered surround and a hood mould, above which is a two-light chamfered mullioned window. The top stage contains paired lancet bell openings with hood moulds in recessed panels forming a corbel table for the parapet. On the south side is a sundial in a traceried quatrefoil, and at the east and west ends are triple stepped lancet windows.
