= Newton Morrell =

Village and civil parish in North Yorkshire, England

Coordinates: 54.47993°N 1.6306°W

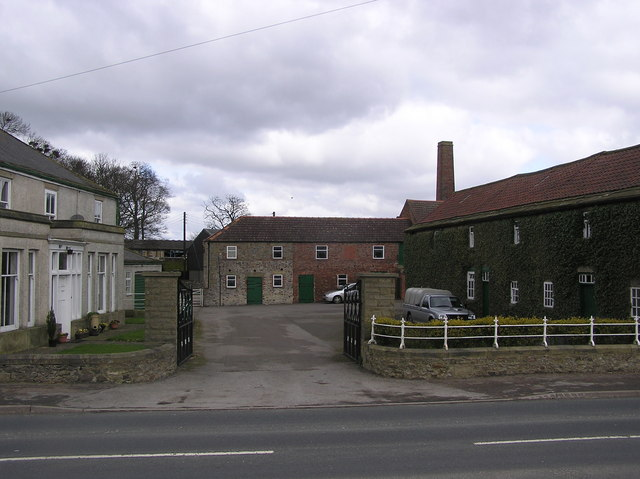
- Farm in Newton Morrell

- Location within North Yorkshire
- OS grid reference: NZ240094
- Unitary authority: North Yorkshire
- Ceremonial county: North Yorkshire
- Region: Yorkshire and the Humber
- Country: England
- Sovereign state: United Kingdom
- Post town: Richmond
- Postcode district: DL10
- Police: North Yorkshire
- Fire: North Yorkshire
- Ambulance: Yorkshire

Newton Morrell is a village and civil parish in the county of North Yorkshire, England. It is 6 miles (9 km) from Darlington and 2 miles (3 km) from Junction 56 on the A1(M) motorway and 7 miles (11 km) north-east of Richmond.

From 1974 to 2023 it was part of the district of Richmondshire, it is now administered by the unitary North Yorkshire Council.

The village was described in the Domesday Book as belong to Count Alan and in the manor of Gilling. The name of the village derives from a combination of Old English (nīwe tūn) and a family surname of Morrell (from Old French meaning "dark and husky").

At the 2011 Census the population of the civil parish was less than 100. Information regarding this population is included in the parish of Cleasby. The village is very near Barton and Stapleton.

Just to the south of the village is what has been designated as a medieval shrunken village. Earthworks are also present at this site.
