= Blackwell Bridge =

Road bridge in Northern England

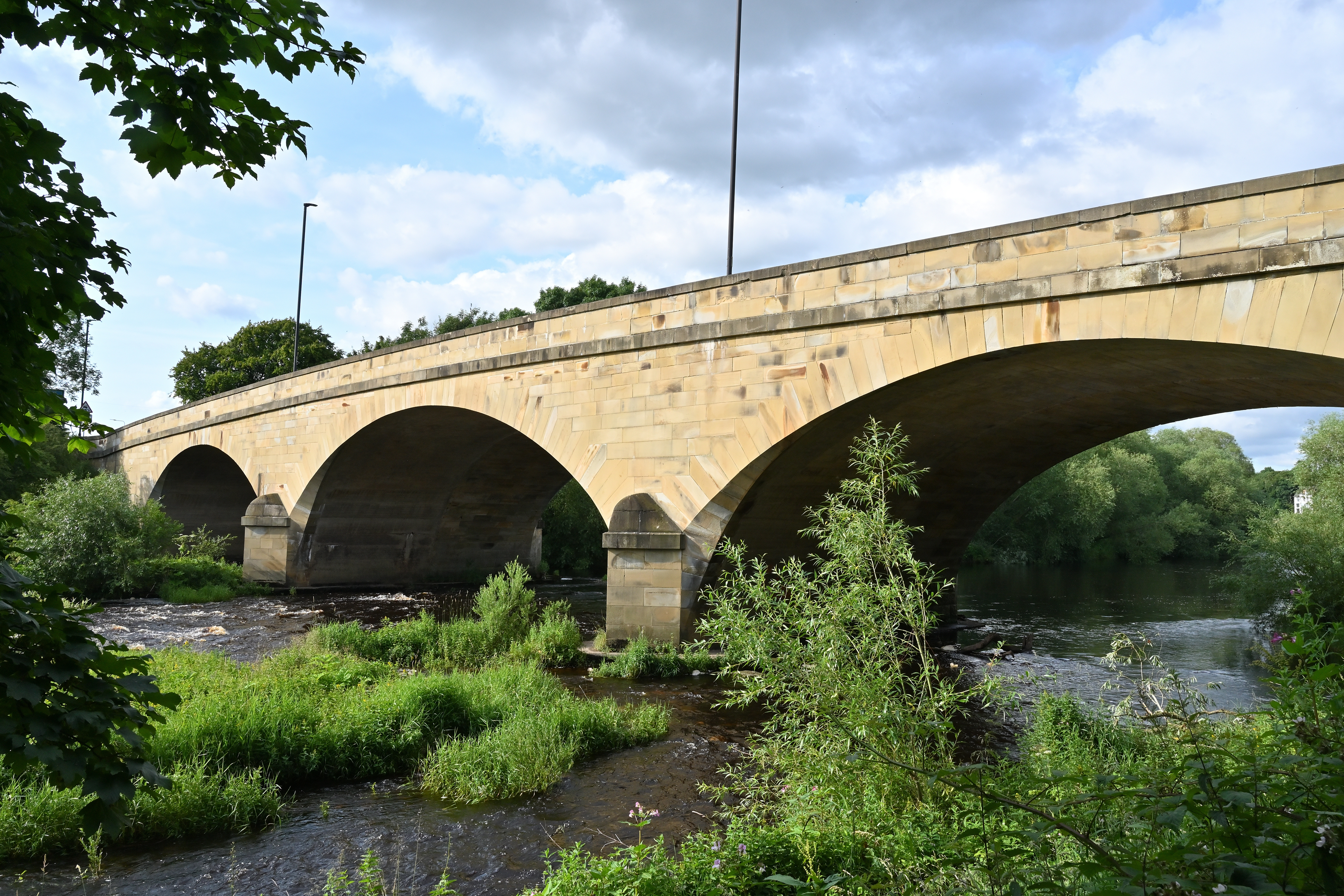
- Blackwell Bridge straddling the River Tees between North Yorkshire and Darlington
- Coordinates: 54.5080°N 1.5842°W
- OS grid reference: NZ270106
- Carries: A66
- Crosses: River Tees

Characteristics
- No. of spans: 3

History
- Architect: John Green
- Opened: 1832
- Rebuilt: 1961

Blackwell Bridge is a masonry road bridge spanning the River Tees between County Durham and North Yorkshire, in Northern England. The bridge was built in 1832, and widened in 1961. It carries the A66 road, which stems from the A66(M) spur off the A1(M) motorway. It used to be the main route north on the A1 until a bypass was opened in 1965.

== History ==
Blackwell Bridge was planned in the early part of the nineteenth century; the tolls for use of the bridge and the associated turnpike received Royal Assent in 1831. The bridge was built in 1832, but before this, most traffic going south from Darlington used Croft Bridge, though a ford did exist at the point where Blackwell Bridge was constructed, however, many lives are recorded as lost at this point due to being swept away by the waters. The main thrust for building the bridge was the transport of coal from Durham into North Yorkshire, which had to use the bridges at either Piercebridge, or Croft, so private finance was raised to enable the building of the bridge. However, within a few years of its construction, the railway to Richmond was built, which effectively took the coal trade away from the road through Stapleton and over the bridge. The bridge is a masonry bridge designed by John Green, however, he initially suggested that a suspension bridge be installed at Blackwell, akin to his design for Whorlton Bridge (also on the River Tees). The proposal for a suspension bridge was due to the turnpike trust advertising for architects and engineers to submit their designs for a suspension bridge at Blackwell.

The bridge has three semi-elliptical arches, with the two side arches being 68 feet (21 m) across, and the centre span some 78 feet (24 m) across. The two end arches reach about 20 feet 6 inches (6.25 m) above the normal water line, whereas the centre arch, reaches a height of 22 feet 6 inches (6.86 m). The parapet is long and sweeps out at the riverbank edges with octagonal piers, and the whole masonry bridge is ashlar, using stone from Gatherley Moor Quarry. Francis Watt stated that Blackwell Bridge was "pretty", and Pevsner described the bridge as "beautiful". Due to the shifting nature of the riverbed, the pillars were set into bales of wool, which was the solution at the time to the possibility of moving foundations. The bridge was originally built to a width of 19 feet (5.8 m) which could only sustain a single carriageway, but just before the A66(M) motorway spur was built, the bridge was disassembled on the south side and was widened to 33 feet (10 m) in 1961.

A cottage for the tollkeeper to work and live in was installed on the Yorkshire side at the northern end. The cottage is still there and is now a private residence, however, tolls on the road and bridge were abolished in 1879, and the tollhouse has been altered from the original design. The old sign displayed on the tollhouse with a list of charges for crossing the bridge, is on display in the Bridge Inn at Stapleton in North Yorkshire. A great flood in 1883, swept the bridge away and took a labourer with it. He was rescued from the river after passing Croft Bridge.

The bridge used to carry a turnpike road from Scotch Corner through Newton Morrell and into Darlington built in 1832. From the 1930s, when roads were classified in Great Britain, the bridge carried the A1 Great North Road until 1965, when the A1(M) Darlington Bypass was built, it now carries the A66 road which now uses the widened bridge. The bridge is a grade II listed structure.
