= St Cuthbert and St Mary's Church, Barton =

Church in Barton, North Yorkshire, England

Coordinates: 54°28′32″N 1°38′45″W

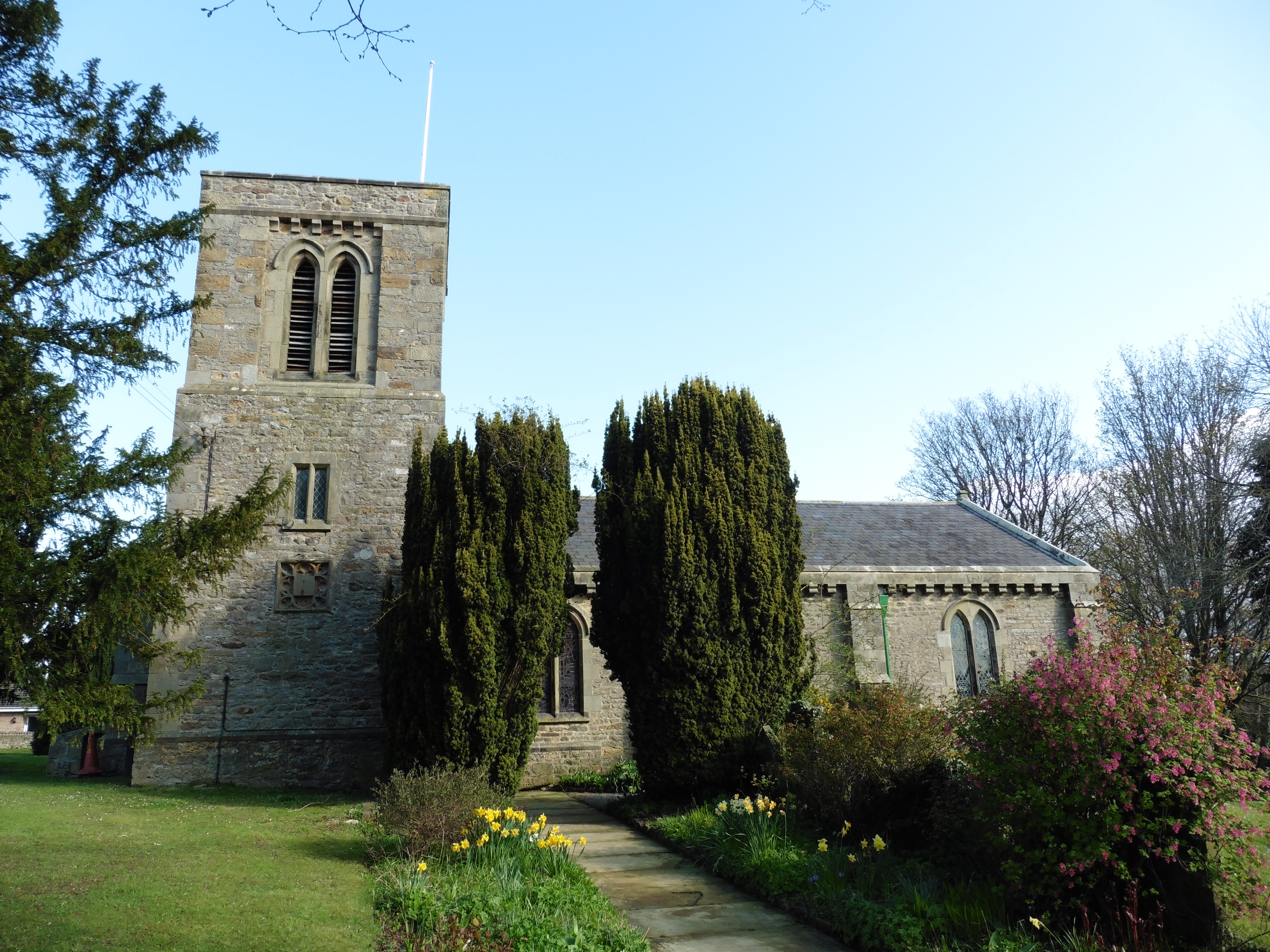
The church, in 2019

St Cuthbert and St Mary's Church is the parish church of Barton, North Yorkshire, in England.

In the medieval period, Barton was served by two churches: St Cuthbert, and St Mary. St Cuthbert fell into ruin, and then in 1840, a new St Cuthbert's Church was completed, to a design by Ignatius Bonomi. St Mary's Church was demolished, and St Cuthbert's was later dedicated to both Cuthbert and Mary. The church was Grade II listed in 1968.

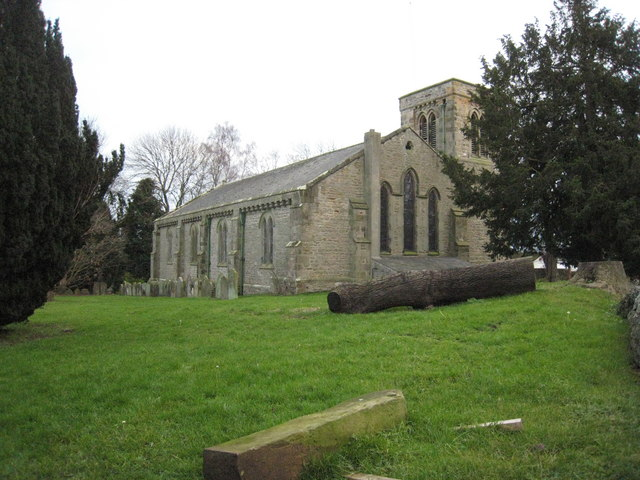
The church, from the southeast, in 2009

The church is built of stone, with a slate roof. It has a four-bay combined nave and chancel, a north vestry, a south chapel, and a southwest tower over a porch. The windows are largely lancets, and the nave and chancel are supported by stepped buttresses. The Victoria County History is critical of the design, describing the church as "architecturally... of no interest".

Inside the church, the original pews survive, along with an original organ case on the north side of the chancel. There is an early 20th century reredos. Much of the stained glass dates from the 1840s, including the west window, by William Wailes. There is a Romanesque font, brought from St Mary's, and several monuments from the 17th century on. Outside, there is a possibly 11th century cross shaft, and a stone inscribed "W E MAY 1678", which was also brought from St Mary's.

== See also ==
- Listed buildings in Barton, North Yorkshire
