= Preston Pipe Bridge =

Bridge over the River Tees in Northern England

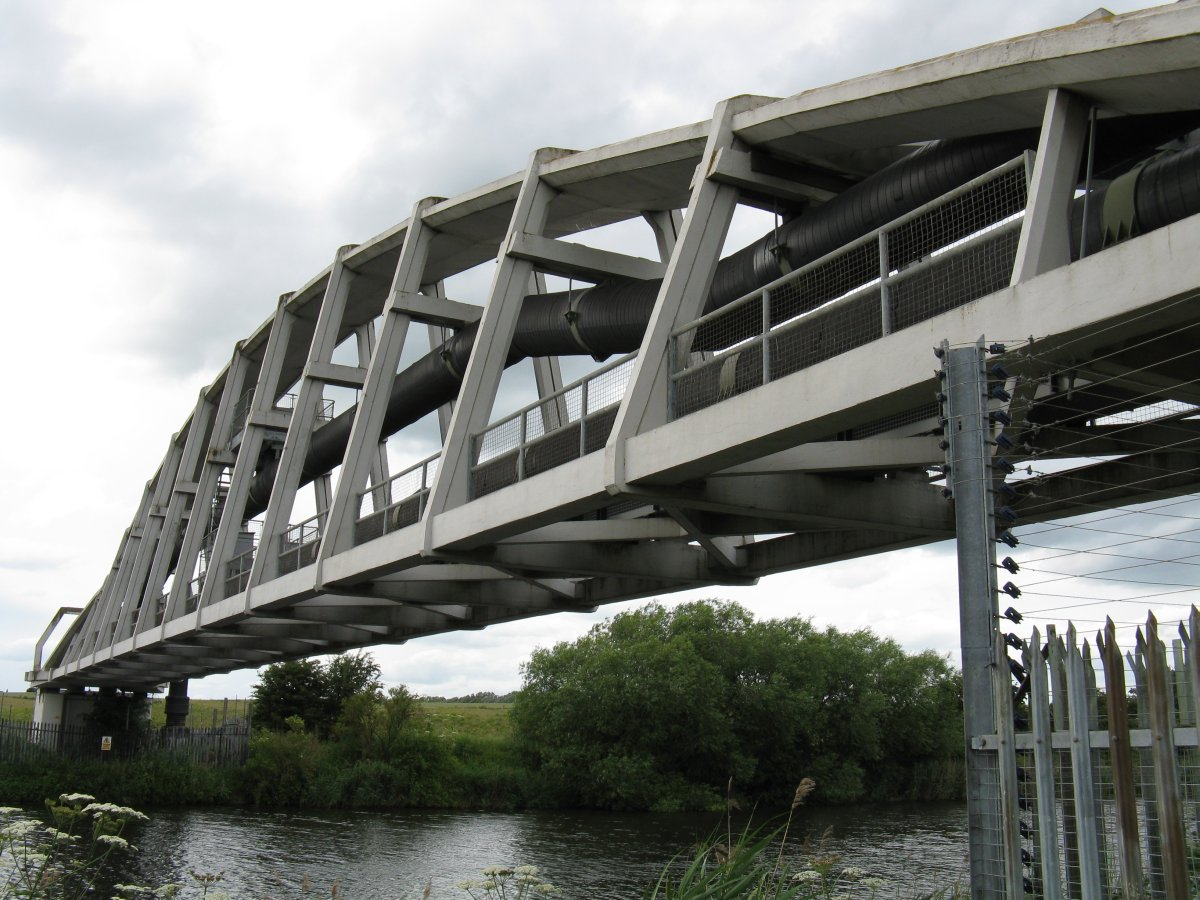
- Preston Pipe Bridge over the River Tees
- Coordinates: 54°32′1.1″N 1°19′24″W
- Carries: Water supply pipes
- Crosses: River Tees
- Locale: Borough of Stockton-on-Tees, England, United Kingdom
- Official name: Preston Pipe Bridge
- Owner: Northumbrian Water
- Preceded by: Yarm Bridge
- Followed by: Jubilee Bridge

Characteristics
- Design: Tied arch
- Material: Concrete and steel
- Longest span: 210 feet (64 m)
- No. of spans: 1
- Piers in water: 0

History
- Constructed by: Dowsett
- Construction end: 1959; 67 years ago

Location
- Interactive map of Preston Pipe Bridge

The Preston Pipe Bridge carries three water pipes across the River Tees between Ingleby Barwick and Preston-on-Tees in the borough of Stockton-on-Tees, northern England. The bridge is situated over 3.1 miles (5 km) upriver from Stockton town centre, and some 660 feet (200 m) upriver from Jubilee Bridge.

== Design ==
Preston Pipe Bridge is a 210 feet (64 m) span tied arch bridge with concrete abutments and supplies water to southern Teesside.

== Construction ==
The bridge was built in 1959 by constructor Dowsett to carry two 33-inch (84 cm) diameter water pipes across the Tees. The bridge arch, weighing 200 tonnes was assembled on the Durham bank from prefabricated parts and rolled out across the river on a temporary Bailey bridge, then moved sideways onto its pre-prepared concrete abutments.

== Operation ==
A third pipe was added in 1979 and there is strictly no public access across the bridge. The bridge is best accessed on foot from the Jubilee Bridge along the river bank. The additional third pipe allowed for the removal a nearby single pipe bridge.
