= Surtees Rail Bridge =

Rail-bridge over the River Tees, Northern England

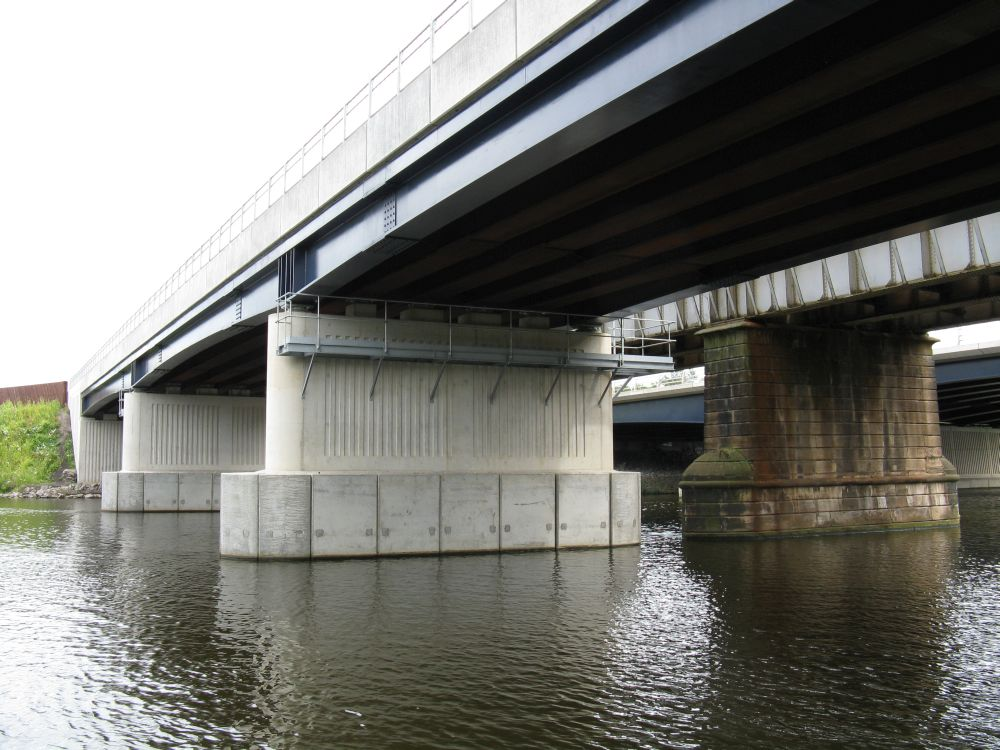
- Surtees Rail Bridge over the River Tees
- Coordinates: 54°33′17.4″N 1°18′38.7″W
- Carries: Rail traffic
- Crosses: River Tees
- Locale: Borough of Stockton-on-Tees, England, United Kingdom
- Official name: Surtees Rail Bridge
- Owner: Network Rail
- Preceded by: Surtees Bridge
- Followed by: Tees Victoria Bridge

Characteristics
- Design: Multiple girder bridge
- Material: Reinforced concrete and steel plate girder
- No. of spans: 3
- Piers in water: 2

History
- Designer: HBPW Partners
- Constructed by: Carillion Civil Engineering and Network Rail
- Construction end: 2009
- Opened: 2009
- Replaces: The 1906 Tees Bridge

The Surtees Rail Bridge is a rail bridge on the Tees Valley Line over the River Tees in the Borough of Stockton-on-Tees. The bridge is south of Stockton-on-Tees town centre and just north of the adjacent Surtees Bridge which carries the A66 road. The bridge is built on the site of a series of Tees Bridges alternating between two adjacent crossing sites.

== Previous rail bridges in Stockton-on-Tees ==
Since 1830 there have been a series of railway bridges over the River Tees at this point. To ensure continuity of service, replacement bridges have been constructed adjacent to the current operational bridge.

=== The 1830 Stockton Railway Bridge ===
The 1830 bridge was an iron chain suspension bridge built principally to carry coal on the Stockton and Darlington Railway to Port Darlington, later to be renamed Middlesbrough, and was to be the first suspension bridge built for railway traffic.

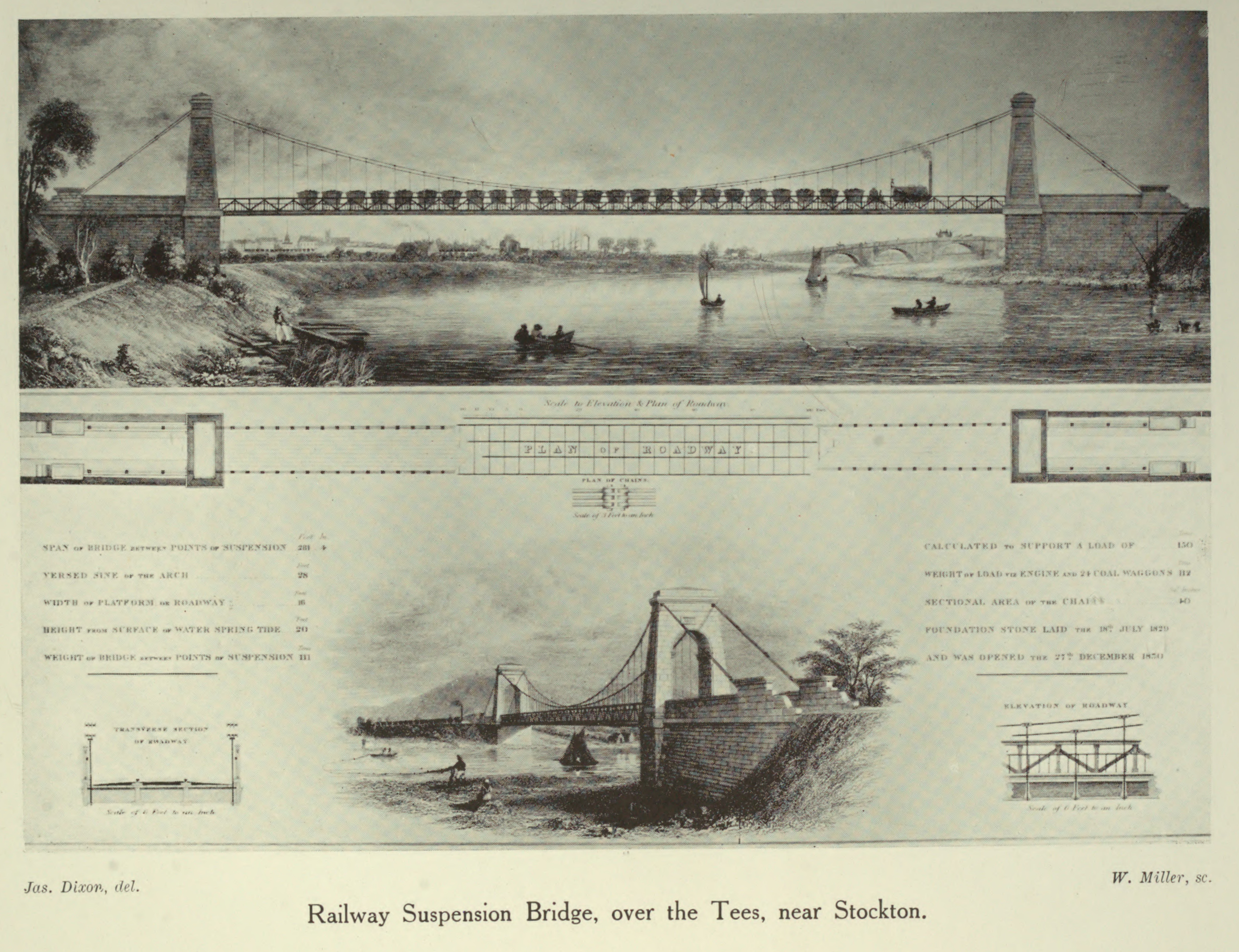
Drawings of the original 1830 Stockton Railway Bridge

Design

The designer was Sir Samuel Brown, a retired naval officer with experience building the 1820 Union Bridge over the River Tweed between Scotland and England, and the Royal Suspension Chain Pier, Brighton (1823).

Stockton Railway Bridge was 412 feet (125.6 m) long with a main span of 218 feet (66 m). The 6 feet (1.8 m) wide unstiffened bridge deck was suspended using 792 feet (241 m) of round eye bar link chain supported by two masonry towers, giving 20 feet (6.1 m) of clearance (heading) on the river below the deck and there were lattice timber parapets on either side of the deck. The whole structure cost £2,300 and weighed only 113 tonnes—less than the loads it was expected to carry.

Construction

Work was started on the bridge in 1829 and it was opened on 27 December 1830.

Trials and operation

When the first trial steam engine and train of loaded coal wagons crossed the bridge on 27 December 1830, the bridge flexed so much that the unstiffened bridge deck rose like a static wave in front of the engine. One particular trial load was enough to damage the towers with one tower on the Yorkshire side cracking. The bridge was propped mid span using trestles and traffic was restricted to four wagons at a time, spaced 27 feet (8 m) apart by chains to spread the load.

The trials had shown that this type of suspension bridge was unsuitable for railway traffic and to this day there are no rail suspension bridges in the UK. Suspension bridges were not used successfully for railways until the building of the 1855 Niagara Falls Suspension Bridge in the USA incorporating both road and rail decks. The foundations and submerged remains of the wooden trestles of the 1830 bridge were found during work for the construction of the 2009 Surtees Rail Bridge.

=== The 1844 Stockton Railway Bridge ===
The 1830 bridge needed a replacement. With site investigations in 1841 by John Harris, Robert Stephenson designed a five span cast iron trussed girder bridge on piled masonry piers. This was built over the period 1841–1844 by contractor Grahamsley and Read and when it opened in May 1844 it replaced the suspension bridge.

The bridge was similar in design to Stephenson's 1846 bridge over the River Dee in Chester that had collapsed in the year following its completion. To ensure the same thing didn't happen at Stockton bridge, props were added and the bridge carried rail traffic until succeeded by the 1881 wrought iron bridge.

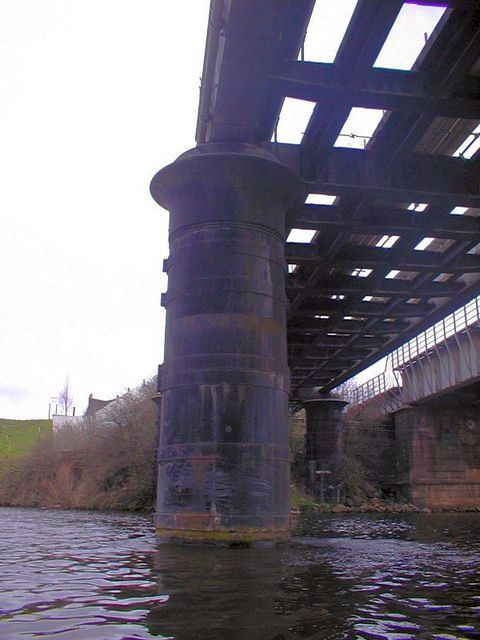
The 1881 Walter Scott bridge

=== The 1881 bridge ===
In 1881 a wrought iron bridge was constructed with five spans of plate girders supported on concrete-filled iron cylinders. When the bridge was superseded by the 1906 bridge the tracks were removed.

In 2008-2009 the 1881 bridge was dismantled and removed by Carillion Civil Engineering to make way for the 2009 Surtees Rail Bridge.

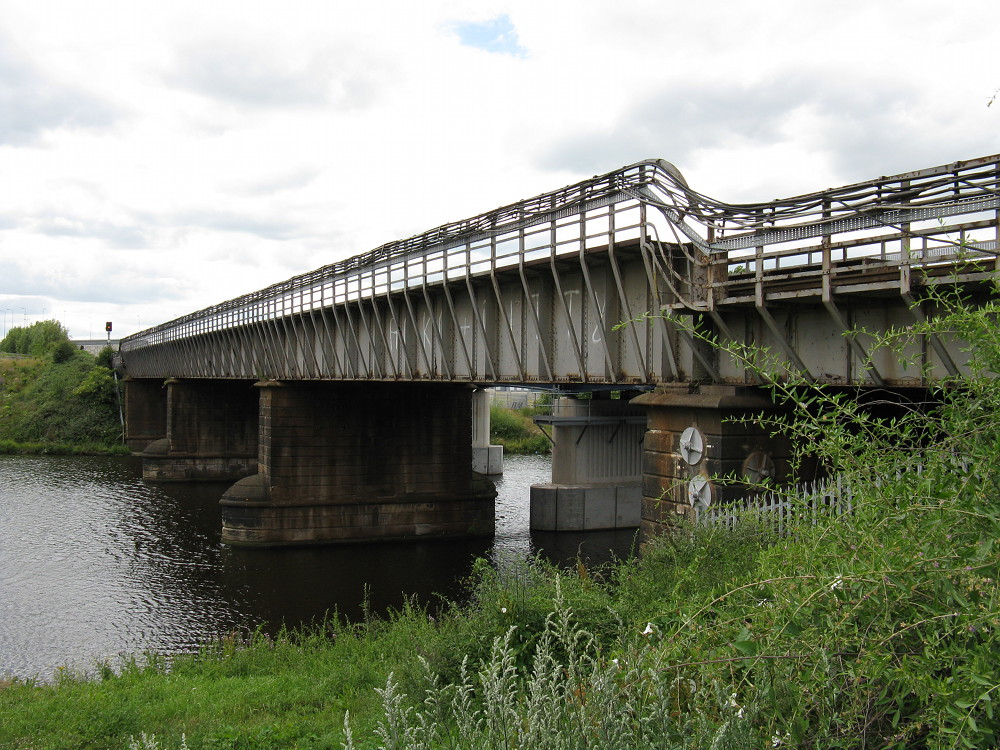
The 1906 Tees Bridge

=== The 1906 Tees Bridge ===
In 1906 a new superstructure was built on the original masonry piers of the 1844 Stephenson bridge using steel plate girders instead of the previous cast iron girders and brought back into use.

The downstream 1881 wrought iron bridge was closed and the tracks removed. Due to settlement of the embankment and bridge distress there was a speed restriction imposed on the 1906 bridge. Although no longer carrying rail traffic, the bridge continues to carry rail signalling cables across the River Tees.

== The 2009 Surtees Rail Bridge ==
In 2008-2009 the 1881 bridge was demolished to build a three span steel and concrete railway bridge. The new bridge was designed by HBPW Structural and Civil Engineering Services and built by Carillion Civil Engineering and Railtrack.

The bridge's piers were designed to align with the middle three piers of the existing 1906 Tees Bridge to allow for the easy passage of river traffic. The 2009 bridge scheme received a commendation in the Institution of Civil Engineers' Robert Stephenson Awards 2010.
