= Tees Jubilee Bridge =

Bridge over the River Tees in Northern England

Jubilee Bridge
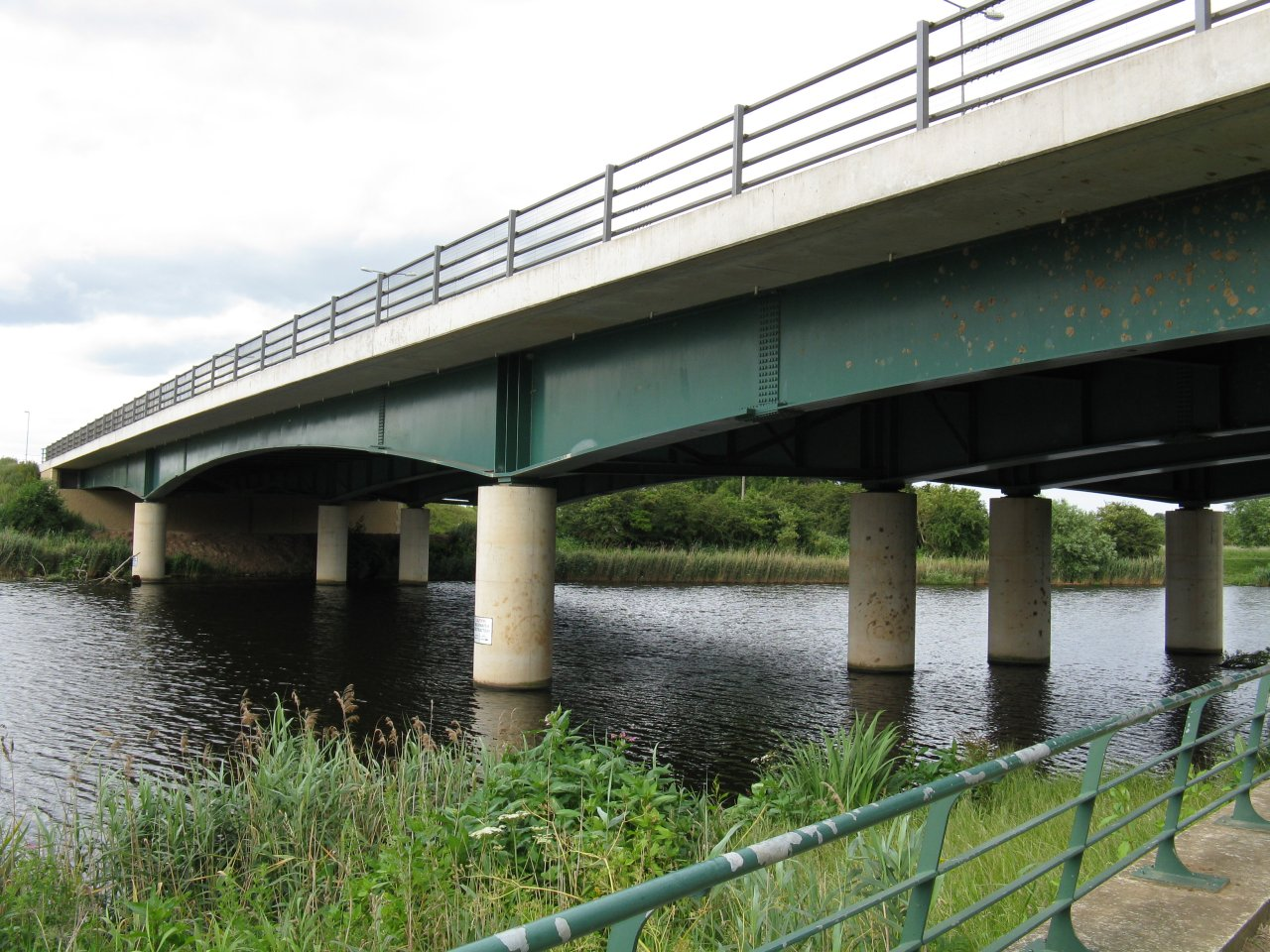
- Jubilee Bridge over the river Tees from west side
- Coordinates: 54°32′5.4″N 1°19′14.5″W
- Carries: Queen Elizabeth Way
- Crosses: River Tees
- Locale: Borough of Stockton-on-Tees, England, United Kingdom
- Official name: Jubilee Bridge
- Preceded by: Preston Pipe Bridge
- Followed by: Surtees Bridge

Characteristics
- Design: Balanced cantilever
- Material: Reinforced concrete and T-section steel plate girders
- Total length: 150 metres (492 ft)
- Longest span: 106 metres (348 ft)
- No. of spans: 3
- Piers in water: 2

History
- Constructed by: Birse Construction Ltd.
- Fabrication by: Cleveland Bridge & Engineering Company
- Construction end: 2002
- Opened: 20 April 2002

The Jubilee Bridge is a road and pedestrian/cycle bridge carrying the Queen Elizabeth Way north-south across the River Tees in the borough of Stockton-on-Tees, northern England. It links Preston-on-Tees with Ingleby Barwick. The bridge is over 3.1 miles (5 km) upriver from, and over 1.9 miles (3 km) approximately south of Stockton town centre.

== Design ==
The Jubilee Bridge is a balanced cantilever design, 150 m long with 3 spans and a main span of 106 m. It is constructed from reinforced concrete and T-section steel plate girders. It carries dual two lane carriageways and additionally on the western side, a pedestrian cycle track linking in to the local pedestrian cycle tracks on the southern bank of the River Tees.

The piers are supported on 914 mm concrete-filled tubular steel piles and the abutments are supported by steel 'H' piles.

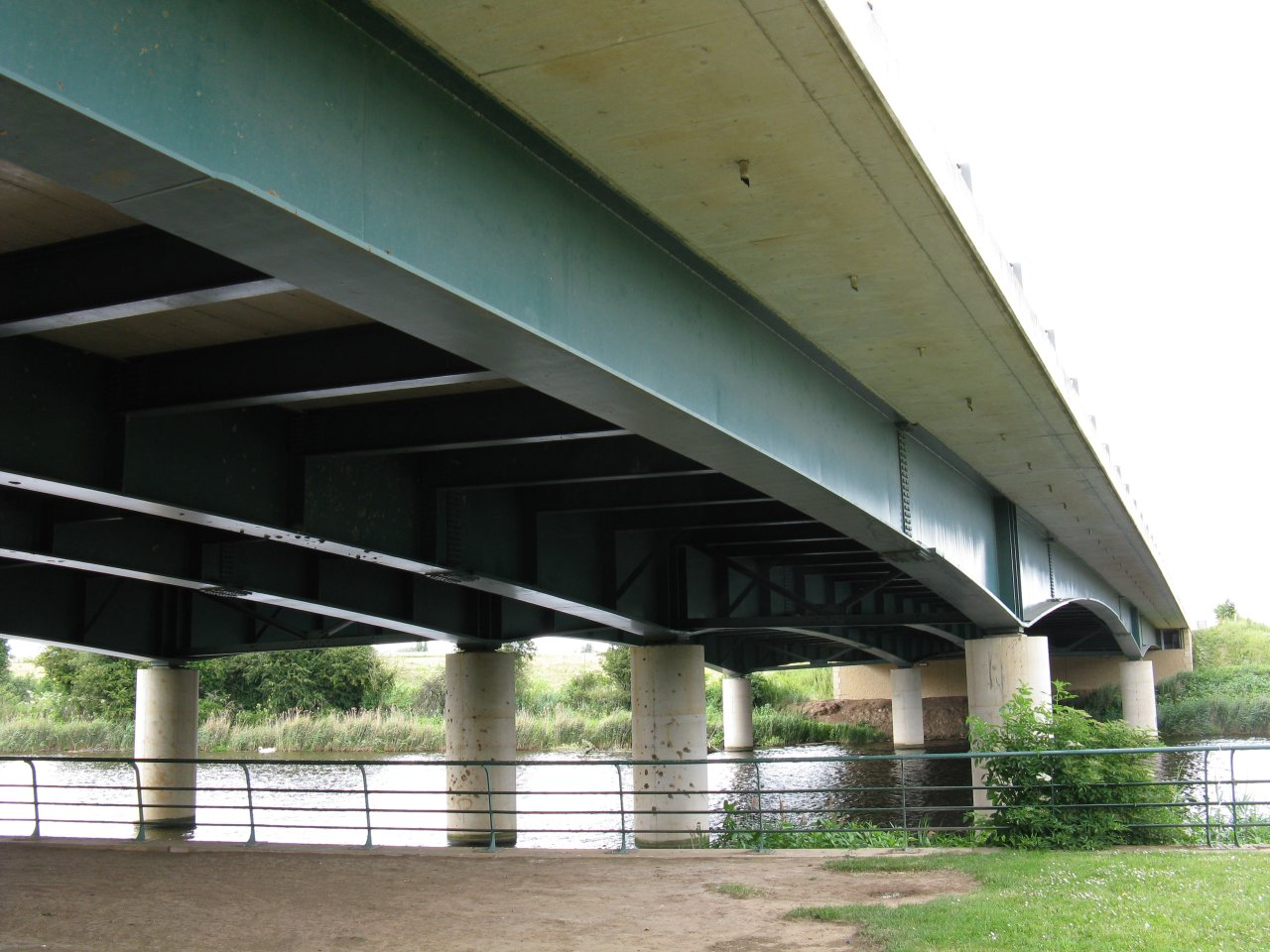
A view from the southern embankment.

=== Construction ===
The bridge was built by Birse Construction Ltd with steel fabrication supplied by Cleveland Bridge & Engineering Company of Darlington.

== Operation ==
The bridge was opened on 20 April 2002.
