= Surtees Bridge =

Bridge over the River Tees in Northern England

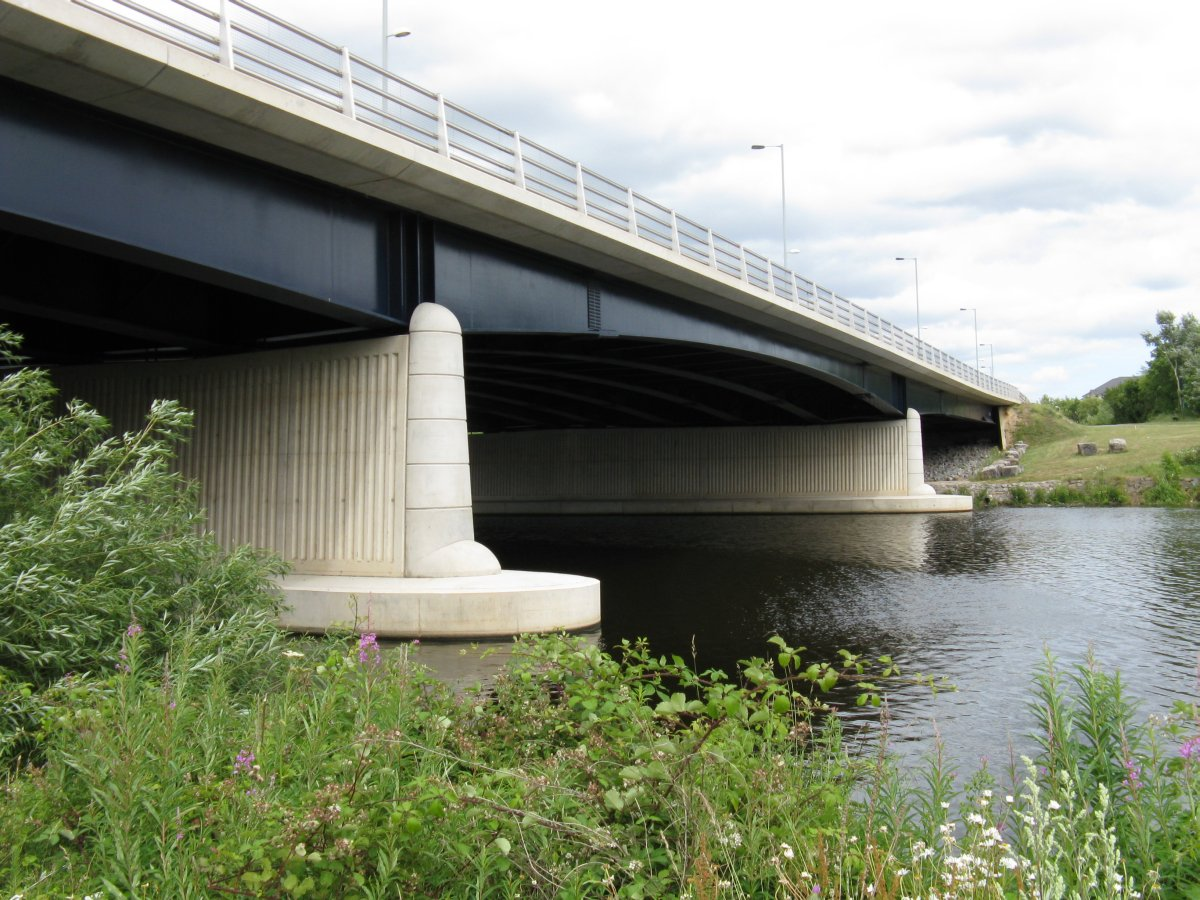
- Surtees Bridge over the River Tees
- Coordinates: 54°33′15.7″N 1°18′38.6″W
- Carries: A66 road
- Crosses: River Tees
- Locale: Borough of Stockton-on-Tees, England, United Kingdom
- Official name: Surtees Bridge
- Owner: National Highways
- Preceded by: Jubilee Bridge
- Followed by: Surtees Rail Bridge

Characteristics
- Design: slab and girder
- Material: Reinforced concrete and steel plate girder
- Total length: 150 metres (492 ft)
- Longest span: 50 metres (164 ft)
- No. of spans: 3
- Piers in water: 2
- Design life: 120 years

History
- Designer: A1 Integrated Highway Services
- Engineering design by: Halcrow Group
- Constructed by: Edmund Nuttall
- Fabrication by: Cleveland Bridge and Engineering Company
- Construction start: 20 March 2006
- Construction end: 22 January 2008
- Opened: 3 December 2007
- Inaugurated: 24 January 2008
- Replaces: Surtees Bridge (1981)

Statistics
- Daily traffic: 55,000 vpd

Location
- Interactive map of Surtees Bridge

The Surtees Bridge is a road bridge carrying the A66(T) road east west across the River Tees near Thornaby-on-Tees in the borough of Stockton-on-Tees in the north east of England. The bridge is situated one kilometre upriver from Stockton town centre, just upriver of Surtees Rail Bridge – a rail bridge carrying the Tees Valley Line. Built at a cost of £14.3 million the bridge replaces an earlier Surtees Bridge (1981) that showed signs of distress resulting from excessive settlement.

The Surtees Bridge and the A1(M) motorway bridge are the busiest over the River Tees with 55,000 vehicles per day. The river level at this point is held at 2.7 mOD by the Tees Barrage which makes the river here permanently navigable.

== The Surtees Bridge (1981) ==
The original Surtees Bridge (1981) was a concrete and steel structure built by The Cementation Company with dual two lane carriageways, four intermediate piers, five spans and was 145 m long with 125 m between abutments. The bridge was opened in 1981 with a design life of 120 years.

Geotechnical surveys prior to construction had indicated that the western approaches of the bridge would be liable to settlement and so they were built in early 1978 under a separate works contract and left to settle for 18–24 months before bridge construction started. Bridge construction took place from 1980 to 1982, during which time the eastern embankment was built, and the bridge was opened in 1981 but even then signs of distress were already showing. Later surveys showed the eastern abutment had rotated and moved by 100–150 mm and sunk 0.7 m, and the bridge bearings had overrun by 100 mm. The bridge problems were caused by underestimations of the depth of the soft alluvial layers on the eastern bank, and secondly overestimation of the rate at which the ground would consolidate during construction which led to the assumption that the settlement of the eastern abutment would be largely over by the time the abutment was complete – instead significant settlement was to continue on after construction. Ground settlement is a problem in the area – the nearby 'Tees Bridge' rail bridge had speed restrictions imposed as it too showed signs of distress.

=== The decision to rebuild ===
The Highways Agency decided on a rebuild for the following reasons: settlement of the eastern abutment and embankment, lateral displacement of the piled foundation, the need to widen the bridge to three lanes to accommodate feeder roads, and because renovation was technically too difficult and too expensive. In addition the bridge did not meet all the standards required to take the new 40 tonne heavy goods vehicles.

== The Surtees Bridge (2008) ==
The present Surtees Bridge is built on the same alignment as the 1981 Surtees Bridge.

=== Design ===
The design of the bridge was by A1 Integrated Highway Services and the design consultant Halcrow.

The bridge is 150 m long and approximately 125 m between abutments with three lane dual carriageways and a pedestrian and cycle track. The bridge is a slab and girder design constructed from reinforced concrete and steel plate girders. It has three spans – the centre span being 50 m and the two side spans 48 m.

The bridge is nine girders wide with in situ concrete decking each girder made up from five girder sections.

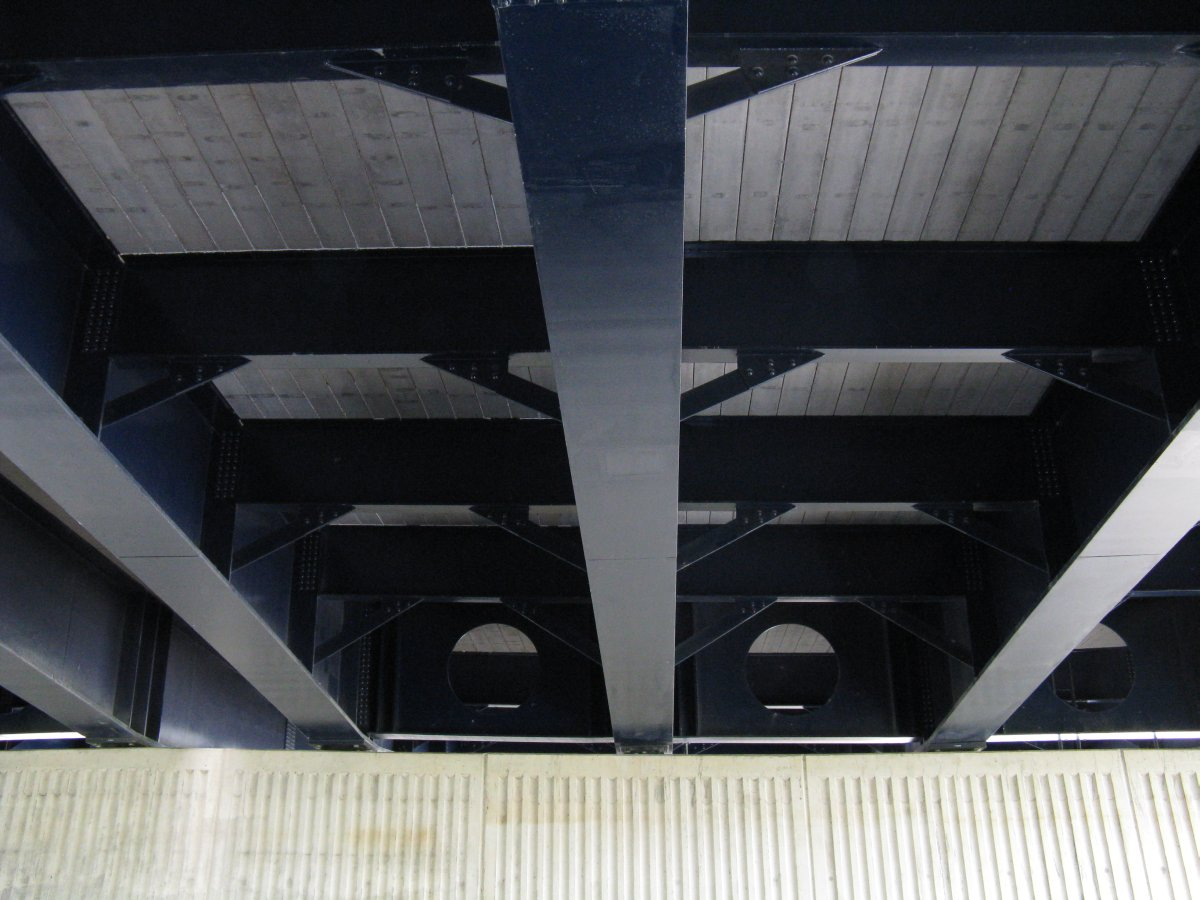
Under the western span of the Surtees Bridge

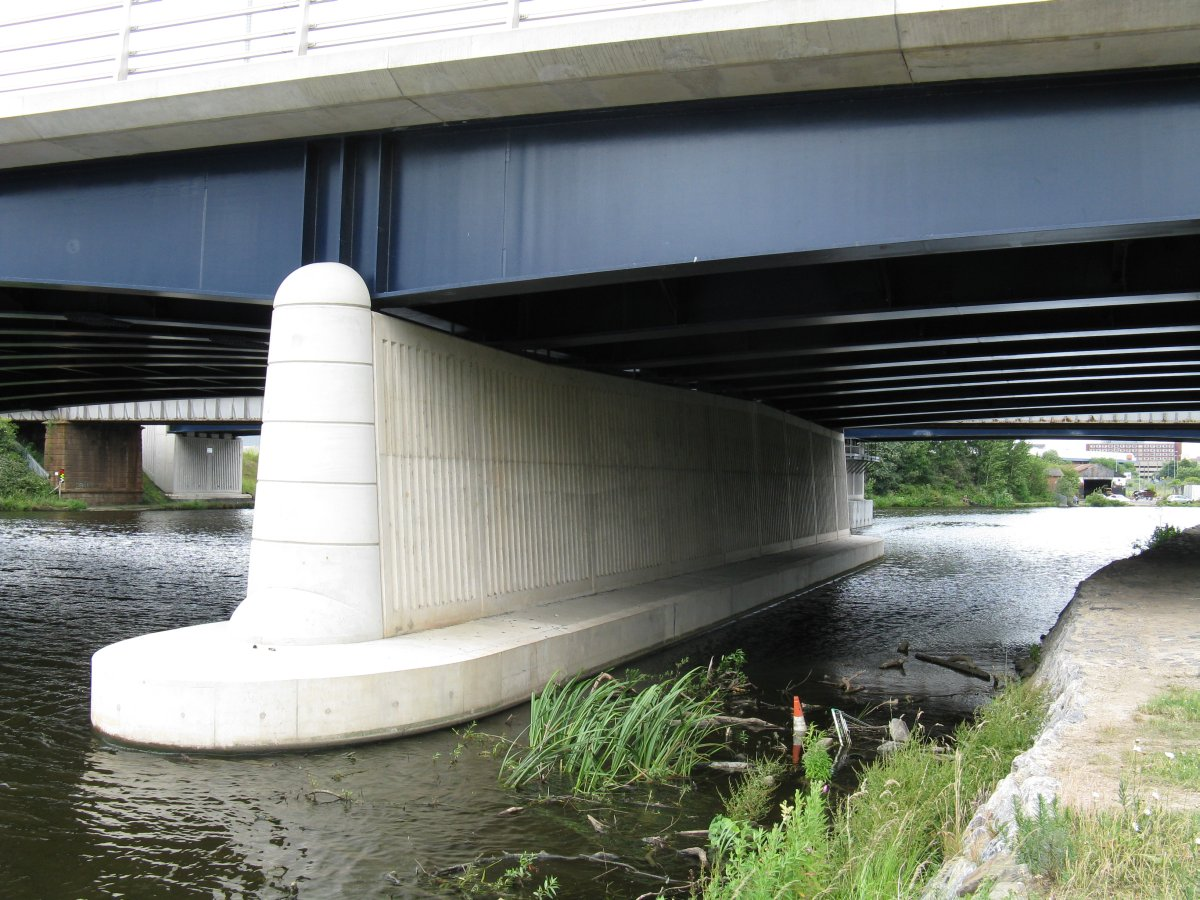
The eastern pier

Each river pier is supported on 22 1220 mm diameter bored case piles finishing with a 3 m socket drilled into sandstone bedrock and the piles are topped with four precast concrete caps produced on site.

The bridge piers themselves are poured concrete and offer improved ship collision protection. The river bed around the piers of both Surtees Bridge and the nearby Tees Bridge rail bridge is covered in 15,000 tonnes of rock riprap scour protection over a geotextile frame. A slightly raked row of driven steel H-piles go in to form the abutment on each side. 130,300 mm square reinforced piles driven into the east embankment act as a precaution against future settlement. A total of 2,000 tonnes of steel were used in the bridge's design.

=== Construction ===
The £14.3 million contract for the construction project was awarded to Edmund Nuttall (now BAM Nuttall) by the Highways Agency in February 2006.

When possible the river remained open to river traffic, and most of the time the road operated with two lanes two-way restricted to 30 mph but for safety reasons there was no pedestrian or cycle access to either the bridge or the river bank. Work was constrained by the presence of the existing bridge, the pent up energy of the twisted bridge structure which had to be relieved carefully, the operational Tees Bridge railway bridge with four trains per hour, and a local gas main. Work started on 20 March 2006 – the contractor planning to be on site for 18 months with a target completion date of August 2007. Work was completed after 23 months on 22 January 2008 with delays blamed on bad weather in particular winds that prevented the use of cranes during their time on site.

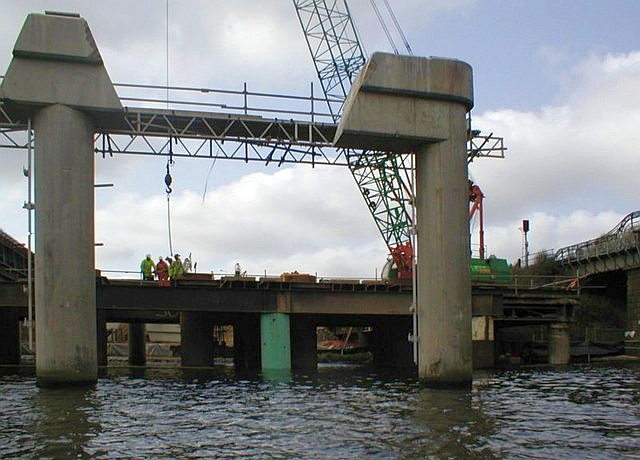
The old Surtees Bridge partially cut away and removed

Phase one of construction was to move the utilities and services. The construction method used was to demolish and build one carriageway at a time – the southern half was dismantled first whilst a contraflow system operated on the northern carriageway. During the early phases the condition of the eastbound section of the old bridge was monitored by contractor ITM and this was of particular interest during pile driving operations.

During June 2006 sections of the old bridge weighing up to 254 tonnes were lifted out overnight, crushed with excavator mounted hydraulic breakers and moved away on multi-axle flat bed trailers. The bridge was dismantled using wire sawing, concrete cutting and hydroblasting.

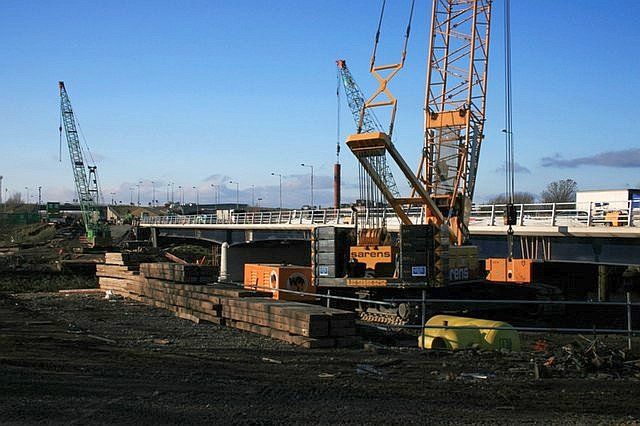
Work nears completion

The mobile crane used for the main lifts was Sarens UK's 1200 tonne Gottwald AK680 working between both sides of the river supported on four piled outrigger pads each on a group of nine 'H' piles driven down 30 m to bedrock. The crane had a height of 80 m with a backmast of 43 m and the counterweight (superlift) used weighed up to 400 tonnes. The crane lifted bridge sections of up to 254 tonnes weight out of and into place, working at a radius of up to 33.7 m. In total the AK680 made four visits to the site for different stages of the work. The two crawler cranes used were a Liebherr LR1160 and a Sumimoto SC1500 working on opposite sides of the river, located on jetties because of the bad ground conditions. These jetties were each supported by 20 piles driven to a depth of 30 m to Sherwood sandstone bedrock.

Fabricated steel was supplied by Cleveland Bridge and Engineering in a £3.3 million contract. The bridge sections were delivered 11 km to the site overnight from nearby Darlington. The sections were two girders wide with in situ concrete deck sections, up to 57 m long and weighing up to 180 tonnes.

Road surfacing work was done by contractor Colas and road traffic management by contractor TMNE – Traffic Management (North East). Road traffic had a tendency to ignore the 30 mph speed restriction necessitating the use of speed cameras. The construction project was completed without injuries. Following the replacement of Surtees Bridge the Tees Bridge railway bridge too was replaced.

=== Operation ===
The bridge was opened to traffic on 3 December 2007 and officially opened on 24 January 2008 by transport minister Tom Harris.

=== Awards ===
The bridge won the RoSPA Occupational Health and Safety Gold Award 2007 and the Civil Engineering Contracting Association, Project of the Year Award.

== Gallery ==
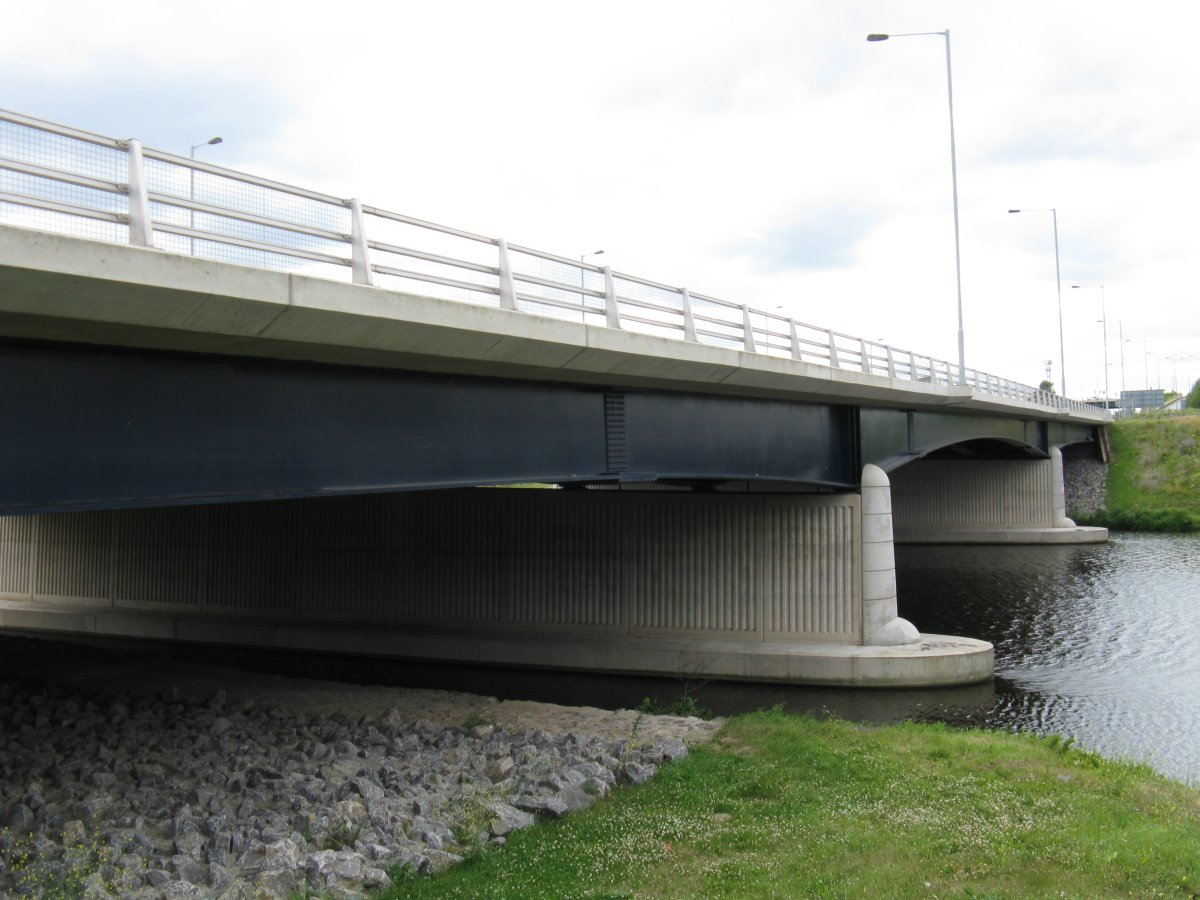
Surtees Bridge from the eastern bank

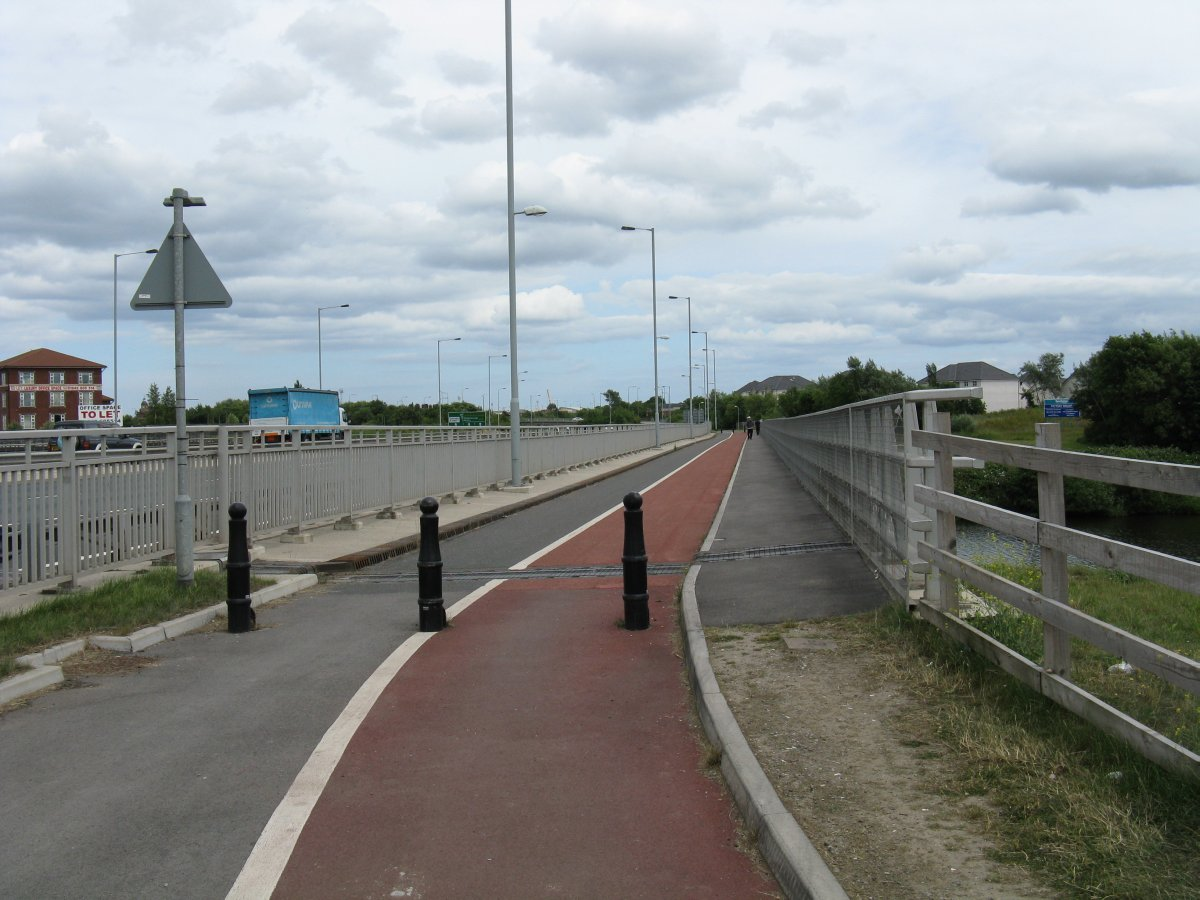
Pedestrian cycleway
