= Croft Viaduct =

Railway bridge in Northern England

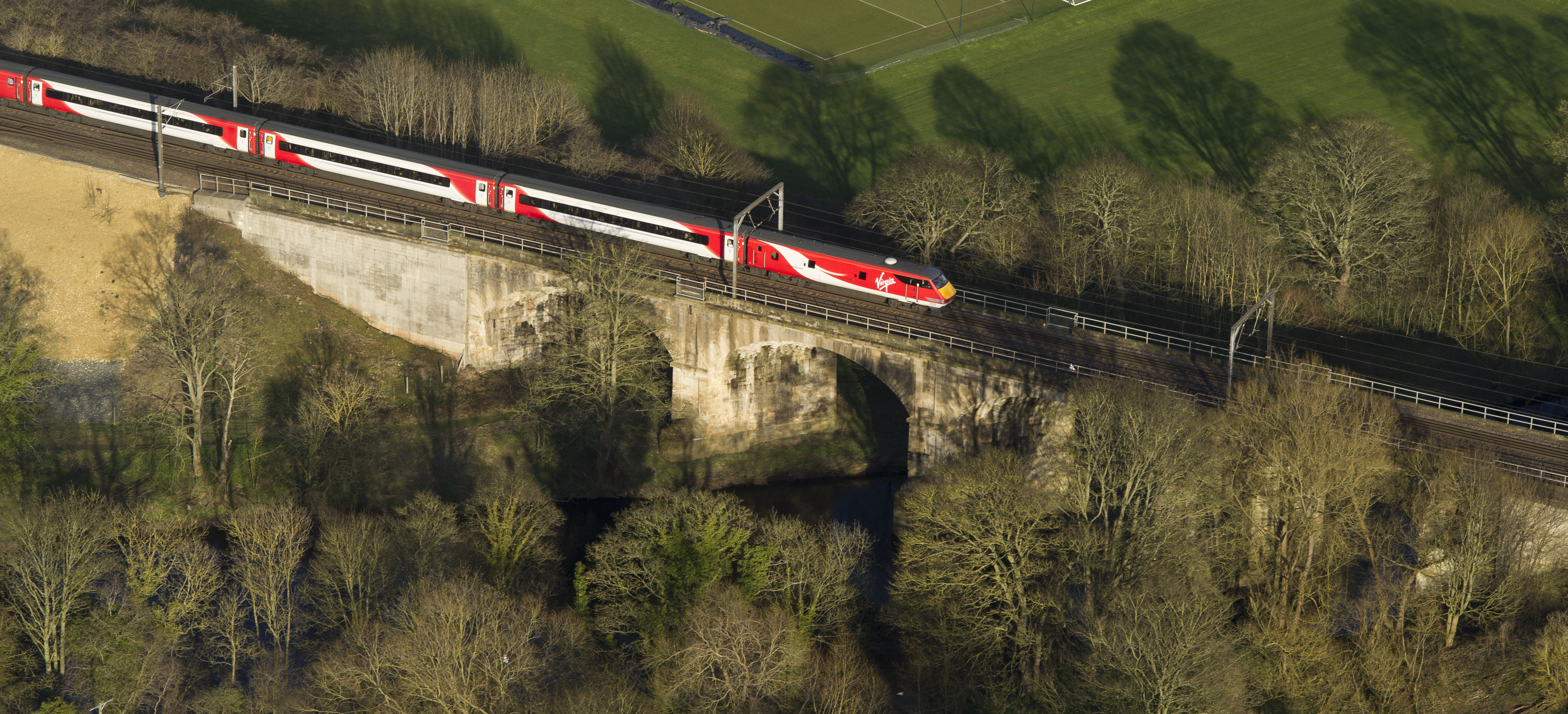
- Coordinates: 54.4774°N 1.5526°W
- OS grid reference: NZ290092
- Carries: East Coast Main Line
- Crosses: River Tees
- Locale: Croft-on-Tees, North Yorkshire, England
- Other name: Tees Railway Bridge
- Owner: Network Rail

Characteristics
- Total length: 7 chains (460 ft; 140 m)
- No. of spans: 4

Rail characteristics
- No. of tracks: 2
- Track gauge: 1,435 mm (4 ft 8 1/2 in) standard gauge
- Electrified: Overhead catenary (1990s)

History
- Construction start: 1837
- Opened: 1841

Location
- Interactive map of Croft Viaduct

Croft Viaduct is a railway bridge carrying the East Coast Main Line between Northallerton and Darlington in Northern England. The viaduct crosses the River Tees, the border between North Yorkshire and County Durham. Although it was an early example of a stone viaduct in the railway system, it is not the first true railway viaduct, however, it was the first railway viaduct in the United Kingdom to have been built with an oblique arch (or skew-arch). It was grade II listed in 1988, and had overhead line equipment installed in the early 1990s.

== History ==
The viaduct was designed by Henry Welsh, and built by Deas and Hogg, (Note: Both the designer and the contractors are reported with different spellings of their names; Henry Welsh is also listed as "Henry Welch", and Deas sometimes as "Dees".) for the Great North of England Railway (GNER) between 1837 and 1840, costing £14,481 (equivalent to £1,663,000 in 2023). Digging for the foundations started on 25 November 1837, and the formation of the line northwards from the viaduct would go on to use the trackbed of the old Croft branch of the Stockton & Darlington Railway. The trackbed was later purchased by the Great North of England Railway. The viaduct is 471 feet (144 m) long, (7 chains (460 ft; 140 m) according to Trackmaps), 49 feet (15 m) above the water of the River Tees, and each of the four arches is 45 feet (14 m) across, (59 feet (18 m) if the 49 degree skew of the arches is taken into consideration). The height of the viaduct from the normal water level to the top of the stone parapets is 58 feet (18 m) and the width of the bridge is 27 feet (8.2 m).

Croft Viaduct crosses the River Tees about 0.5 miles (0.8 km) east of Croft Bridge (which carries the A167), and curves slightly to the south east. The viaduct is the most significant engineering structure built on the section of line between York and Darlington, and was opened to traffic in 1841.

During construction, the building of the viaduct was beset by labour disputes, with the engineer being authorised to hire more men to complete the building phase at the contractors' expense. It is one of the oldest viaducts on the railway network, and was the first railway viaduct in the United Kingdom to be built with a skew-arch. Apart from some re-inforced concrete, the viaduct is largely composed of the original stone; dressed ashlar cream sandstone, with late 20th century parapet railings.

A tradition of newly-appointed bishops arriving into County Durham being presented with a falchion which slew the Sockburn Worm, is normally associated with the road bridge at Croft-on-Tees, which in railway terms, is 35 chains (2,300 ft; 700 m) upstream. However, in 1860, Henry Montagu Villiers arrived by train, and so the locomotive was stopped on Croft Viaduct to allow the ceremony to take place.

The viaduct is registered with Historic England as a grade II listed structure. It had overhead line equipment installed in the early 1990s, with the first electric train north from York, reaching Edinburgh in June 1991. As Croft Viaduct was listed as Grade II in 1988, consent had to be sought from the local authority to alter the structure with the catenary. Historic England list the name of the bridge as being "Tees Railway Bridge".

The original Croft Branch of the Stockton & Darlington Railway had a proposal to cross the Tees to venture 1-mile (1.6 km) into Yorkshire, but the cost of building a bridge was found to have been prohibitive. The Croft Branch was also further north (upstream) of the position of Croft Viaduct.

== See also ==
- Infrastructure of the East Coast Main Line
- Listed buildings in Croft-on-Tees
