= Barforth =

Civil parish in County Durham, England

Coordinates: 54.542°N 1.743°W

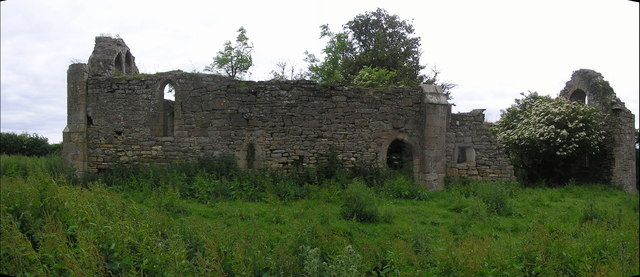
- The ruins of St. Lawrence's chapel, in Barforth, are among the few visible remains of Old Richmond.

- Location within County Durham
- Population: 77 (2001 Census)
- OS grid reference: NZ167163
- Unitary authority: County Durham
- Ceremonial county: County Durham
- Region: North East
- Country: England
- Sovereign state: United Kingdom
- Post town: DARLINGTON
- Postcode district: DL2
- Police: Durham
- Fire: County Durham and Darlington
- Ambulance: North East
- UK Parliament: Bishop Auckland

Barforth is a civil parish in the Teesdale area of County Durham, England, near Gainford. According to the 2001 census the parish had a population of 77. At the 2011 Census the population remained less than 100. Information is therefore maintained in the parish of Ovington. The northern border of the parish is the River Tees. Until the county boundary changes of 1974, the parish was in the county of North Yorkshire. The name of the parish derives from the Old English of bereford, meaning barley ford.

== Landmarks ==
The abandoned village of Old Richmond lay in Barforth, west of Gainford, and the remains include the ruins of a dovecote and of St Lawrence's chapel, as well as the still-inhabited Barforth Hall.
