= Stapleton-on-Tees =

Village and civil parish in North Yorkshire, England

Coordinates: 54.50385°N 1.59408°W

Stapleton
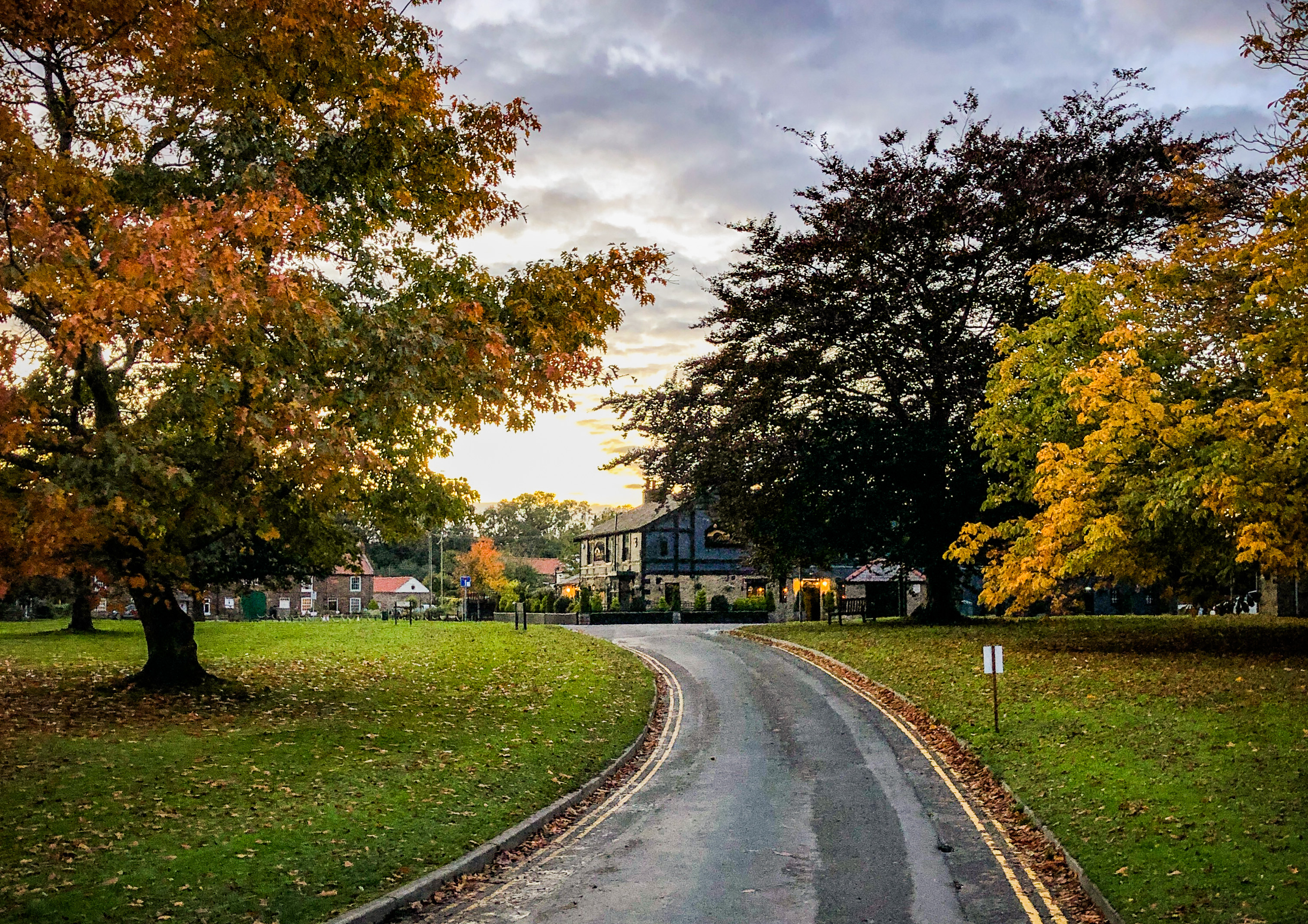
- The village green in autumn

- Location within North Yorkshire
- Population: 179 (2011 census)
- OS grid reference: NZ263121
- Unitary authority: North Yorkshire
- Ceremonial county: North Yorkshire
- Region: Yorkshire and the Humber
- Country: England
- Sovereign state: United Kingdom
- Post town: Darlington
- Postcode district: DL2
- Police: North Yorkshire
- Fire: North Yorkshire
- Ambulance: Yorkshire
- UK Parliament: Richmond (North Yorks)

Stapleton (/ˈsteɪpəltən/), is a small village and civil parish on the River Tees, North Yorkshire, England. Historically, the settlement was part of the North Riding of Yorkshire.

== Etymology ==
There is some dispute of the etymological origins of the place name Stapleton. Historian Henry Chetwynd-Stapylton (quoting Samuel Johnson) states in 1884 that the first part of the name, 'staple', originated from the word 'stapel' meaning a trading position or a place where goods for sale are stored. Another theory, however, puts forward that 'staple' originates from the old English word 'stapol' meaning boundary, which is also plausible given the villages past as a major river crossing. In both cases the second part of the name, 'ton', originates from the Anglo-Saxon 'tun' meaning settlement.

== History ==
Stapleton was mentioned in the Domesday Book of 1086. Though it has been known that a settlement has existed on this sharp bend in the river since the 9th century. The village and surrounding area were granted by William the Conqueror to a knight who would become known as Benedict de Stapleton. One member of the Stapleton family, Miles Stapleton of Bedale was one of the founding members of the Order of the Garter. The family built a manor in the village as well as a private chapel named after St James. In the 13th century the 'de Stapleton' family gave some lands around the village to the nearby Premonstratensian monks of Easby Abbey and in so doing forgoing the obligation to maintain a ferryboat across the river. The settlement had a second church known as St Leonard's, which was administered by Easby Abbey. Neither the manor nor either of the two churches exist today. However, local speculation suggests that the site of the manor is located in 'Garth Field', the irregularity of the land being the last remnants of a defensive moat or pond. By 1616 the Stapleton family had left the village and the churches fell out of use, following this, the village was served by the 12th century Church of St Peter. This is thought to be the origin of the local name given to the path to the nearby village of Croft, the 'Corpse Walk', so named as the deceased of the village had to be carried from Stapleton to Croft, a distance of some three miles.

During the medieval period, a bridge linked the village to the northern bank of the river and a ferry had existed before that. It is believed that this gave the village's only public house (The Bridge Inn) its name. This bridge however was lost after a flood and was not replaced, meaning that the nearest crossing was at Croft-on-Tees until 1832 when the Blackwell Bridge was built.

In 1945 the village was used as a filming location for the film Way to the Stars. Until the second half of the 20th century the village was served by a post office, a blacksmith and a public house. Only the latter is still in use.

== Today ==
Stapleton was part of the former North Riding of Yorkshire and is today part of the county and district of North Yorkshire. From 1974 to 2023 it was in the district of Richmondshire, it is now administered by the unitary North Yorkshire Council.

The village also lies within the Richmond Constituency, represented since 2015 by Conservative Party Member of Parliament and former Prime Minister Rishi Sunak. Residents use the GP surgery in Aldbrough St John and Friarage Hospital in Northallerton.

== Geography ==
Stapleton is situated above the banks of the Tees on the lower course of the river. In the locality of the village the river meanders through a fertile clay plain on its way the Tees Estuary. The settlement is predominantly surrounded by 'undulating' agricultural land, which is used for both arable and pastoral farming. A notable feature of the nearby landscape is a prominent low escarpment, known as the 'Monkend Hills', which stretch from Croft to the east (taking their name from Monkend Hall) across to Manfield in west. From the top of Stapleton Bank, views can be seen towards the North York Moors, Yorkshire Dales and Upper Teesdale. Walkers following the long-distance walk known as the 'Teesdale Way' pass through the village.

== See also ==
- Listed buildings in Stapleton-on-Tees

== Gallery ==
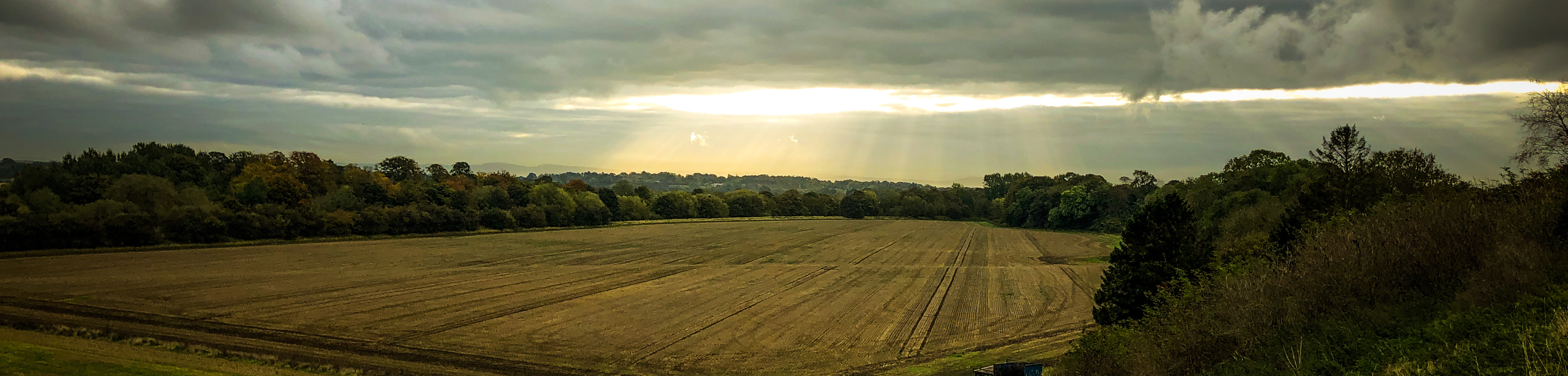
Panoramic view of farmland at Stapleton. The North York Moors can be seen in the distance.

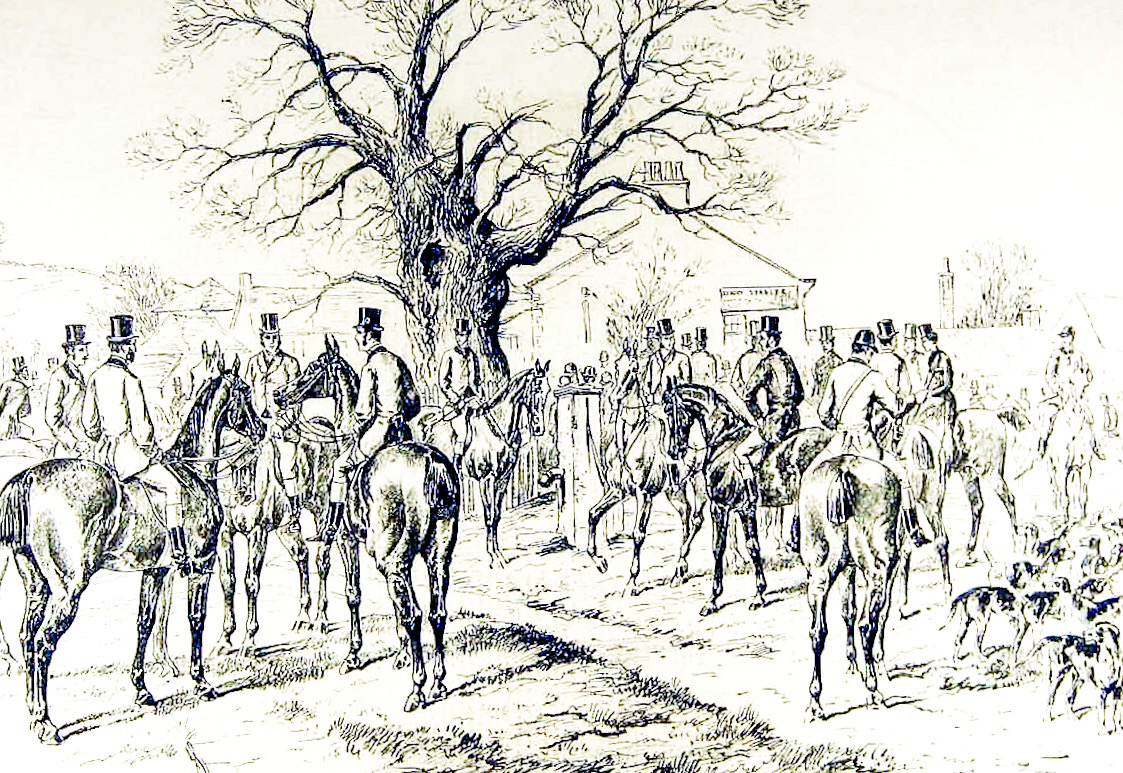
The Marquess of Zetland's hounds at Stapleton village green in the 1870s.

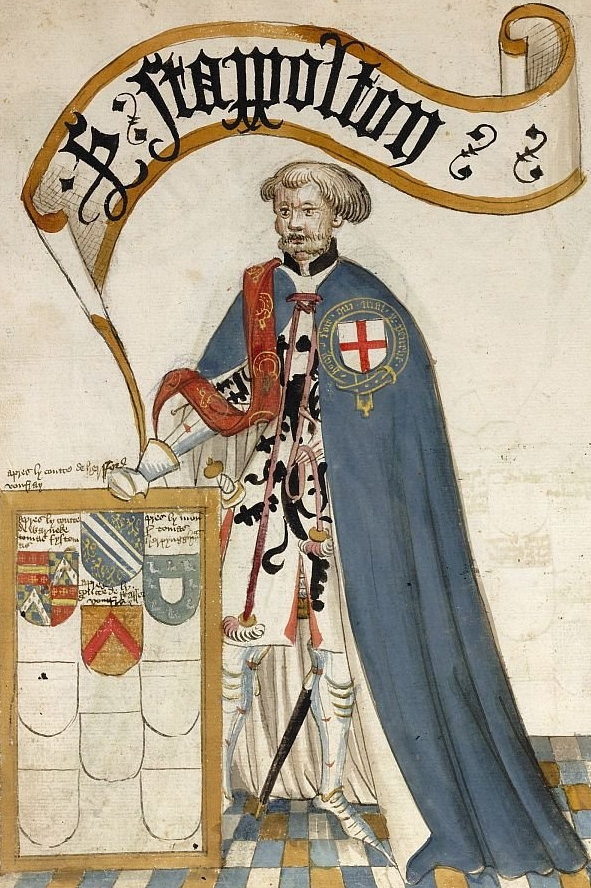
Miles Stapleton, whose family took the name of the village and owned the surrounding lands it for many centuries.

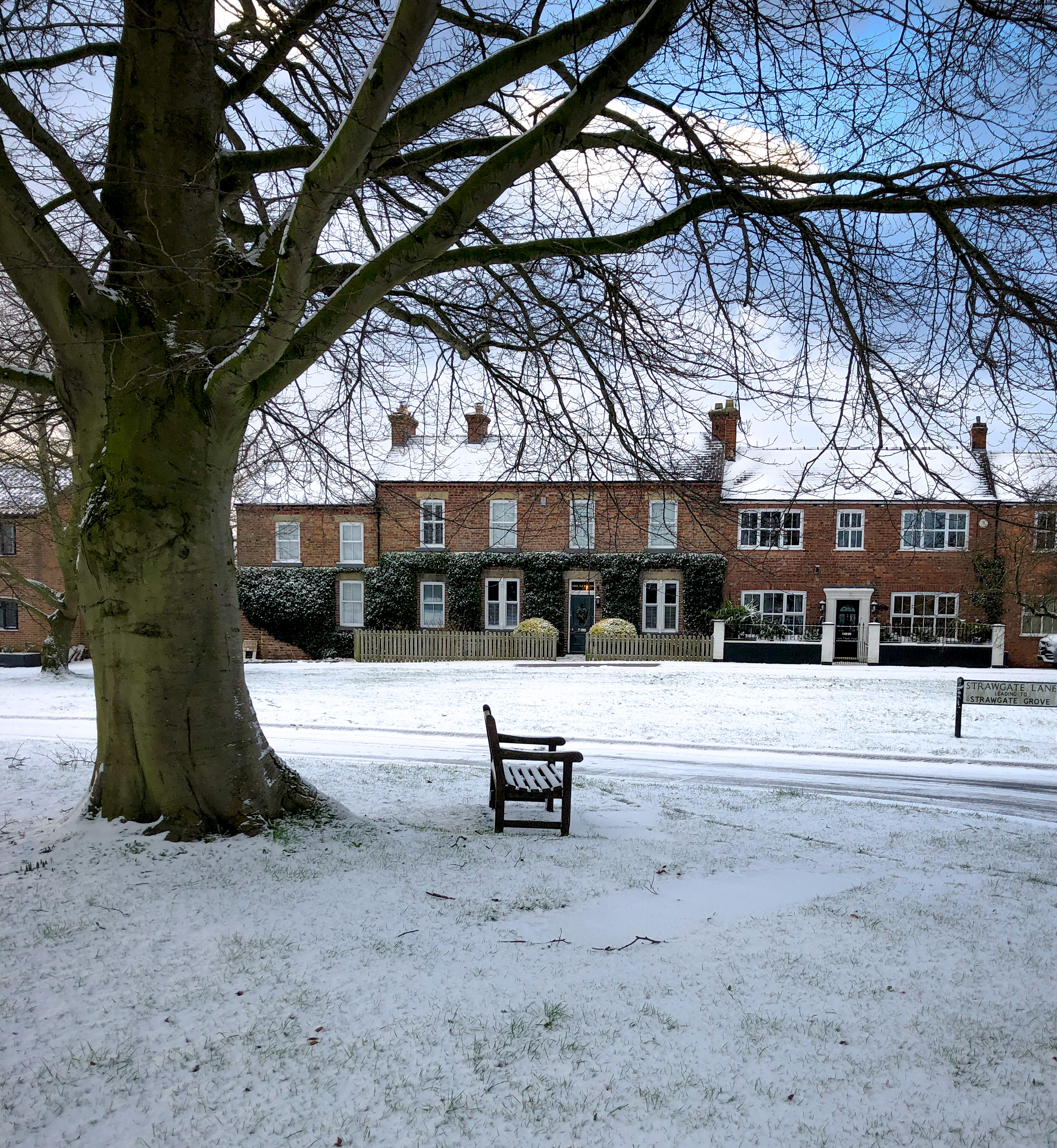
Stapleton green in the snow.

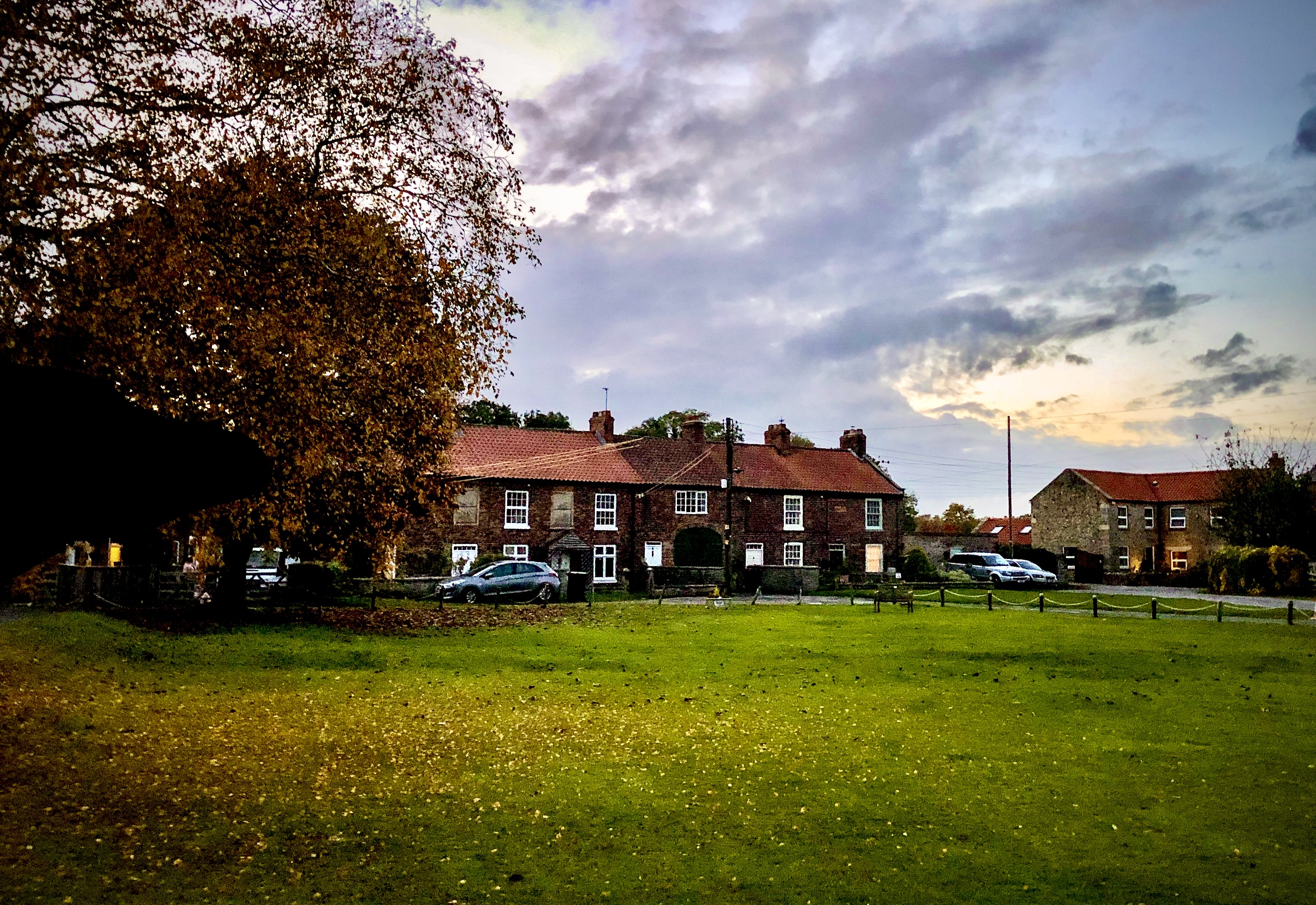
Grade II listed late Georgian cottages at the west end of the village green.

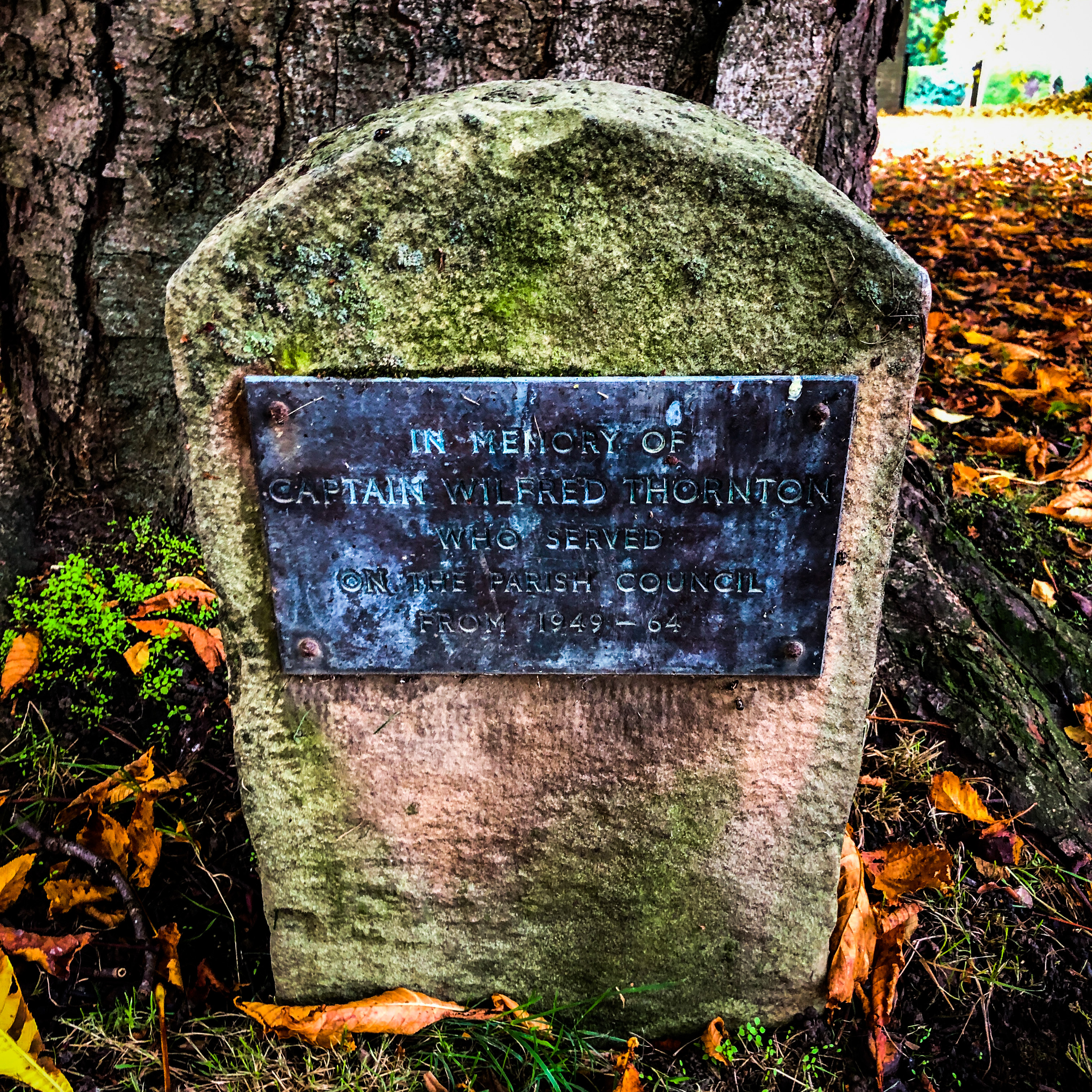
Memorial to Captain Wilfred Thornton on Stapleton village green.
