= Middle Side and Stonygill Meadows =

Middle Side & Stonygill Meadows
- Location within County Durham
- Location: MAGiC MaP
- Nearest town: Middleton-in-Teesdale
- Coordinates: 54°37′56″N 2°6′31″W
- Area: 17.27 ha (42.7 acres)
- Established: 1991
- Governing body: Natural England
- Website: Middle Side & Stonygill Meadows SSSI

Middle Side and Stonygill Meadows is a Site of Special Scientific Interest in the Teesdale district of County Durham, England. It consists of two separate areas, one to the north of the River Tees, the other on the south bank, about 2 km upstream from the village of Middleton-in-Teesdale. The Park End Wood and Middle Crossthwaite SSSIs lie on the same stretch of floodplain, the Teesdale Allotments SSSI is a short distance to the north, while the higher ground to the south of the river is part of the Upper Teesdale SSSI.

The site mainly consists of hay meadows, which are managed by traditional methods and support a wide variety of grasses and forbs. Common grasses include red fescue, Festuca rubra, cock's foot, Dactylis glomerata, common bent, Agrostis capillaris, and sweet vernal grass, Anthoxanthum odoratum. Common herbs include common sorrel, Rumex acetosa, wood cranesbill, Geranium sylvaticum, and great burnet, Sanguisorba officinalis. Less common are the locally rare melancholy thistle, Cirsium helenioides, globe flower, Trollius europaeus, common bistort, Polygonum bistorta, and alpine bistort, P. viviparum.
