= Ettersgill =

Village in County Durham, England

Coordinates: 54.664°N 2.183°W

- Location within County Durham
- OS grid reference: NY883299
- Unitary authority: County Durham
- Ceremonial county: County Durham
- Region: North East
- Country: England
- Sovereign state: United Kingdom
- Post town: DARLINGTON
- Postcode district: DL12
- Police: Durham
- Fire: County Durham and Darlington
- Ambulance: North East

Ettersgill is a village in County Durham, England. It is situated at the top of Teesdale, on the north side of the Tees between Newbiggin and Forest-in-Teesdale, and is in the civil parish of Forest and Frith. The village consists of scattered farms and farmhouses, centered on the fertile valley created by Etters Gill Beck, which flows from the moorland into the Tees south of High Force.
