= Middle Crossthwaite =

- Location within County Durham
- Location: MAGiC MaP
- Nearest town: Middleton-in-Teesdale
- Coordinates: 54°37′33″N 2°6′27″W
- Area: 24.07 ha (59.5 acres)
- Established: 1991
- Governing body: Natural England
- Website: Middle Crossthwaite SSSI

Middle Crossthwaite is a Site of Special Scientific Interest in the Teesdale district of County Durham, England. It is situated on the south bank of the River Tees, about 1.5 km upstream from the village of Middleton-in-Teesdale. The Park End Wood and Middle Side and Stonygill Meadows SSSIs lie on the same stretch of floodplain, while the higher ground to the south is part of the Upper Teesdale SSSI.

The site contains a complex mix of habitats, mainly hay meadows, upland wood pasture and base-rich flushes. Hay meadows are a diminishing habitat, which is threatened by modern agricultural practices, and those at Middle Crossthwaite are among the richest in species in Upper Teesdale.

A wide variety of grasses and herbs are present in the meadows, including the locally rare melancholy thistle, Cirsium helenioides, globe flower, Trollius europaeus, and alpine bistort, Polygonum viviparum. In the areas of wood pasture, typical tree species include ash, Fraxinus excelsior, hazel, Corylus avellana, and blackthorn, Prunus spinosa, over an understorey which includes foxglove, Digitalis purpurea, bluebell, Hyacinthoides non-scripta, and wood sorrel, Oxalis acetosella.
