= Forest and Frith =

Civil parish in County Durham, England

Coordinates: 54.68°N 2.23°W

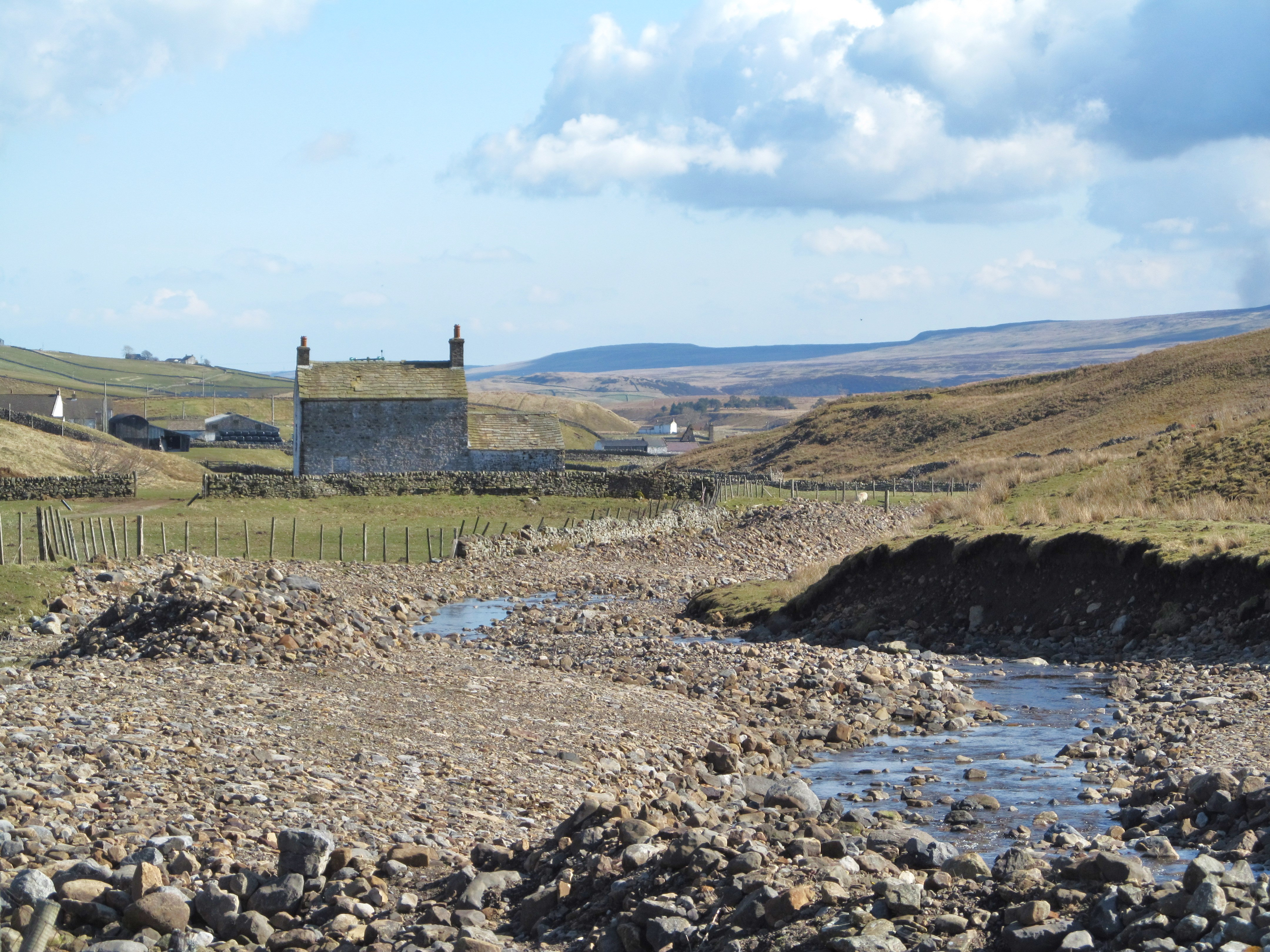
- Harwood Beck and hills

- Location within County Durham
- Population: 163 (2011 census)
- Civil parish: Forest and Frith
- Unitary authority: County Durham
- Ceremonial county: County Durham
- Region: North East
- Country: England
- Sovereign state: United Kingdom

Forest and Frith is a civil parish in the County Durham unitary authority, in the ceremonial county of Durham, England. In the 2011 census it had a population of 163.

The parish has an area of 7,002 hectares (27.03 sq mi). It is bordered by the parishes of Stanhope to the north, Newbiggin to the east, Holwick to the south east and Lunedale to the south, in County Durham, and by Westmorland and Furness in Cumbria to the west, the western boundary being the River Tees and Cow Green Reservoir. The main settlements in the parish are Forest-in-Teesdale, Ettersgill, Harwood and Langdon Beck.

The 1870-72 Imperial Gazetteer of England and Wales describes Forest and Frith as a township in Middleton-in-Teesdale of 17,270 acres (6,990 ha; 26.98 sq mi) with a population of 862 in 130 houses. In 1866 it became a parish in its own right.

It does not have a parish council but has a parish meeting.

There are 10 listed buildings in the parish: a barn, 3 bridges, 5 milestones and a water wheel pit. The parish lies within the North Pennines Area of Outstanding Natural Beauty.

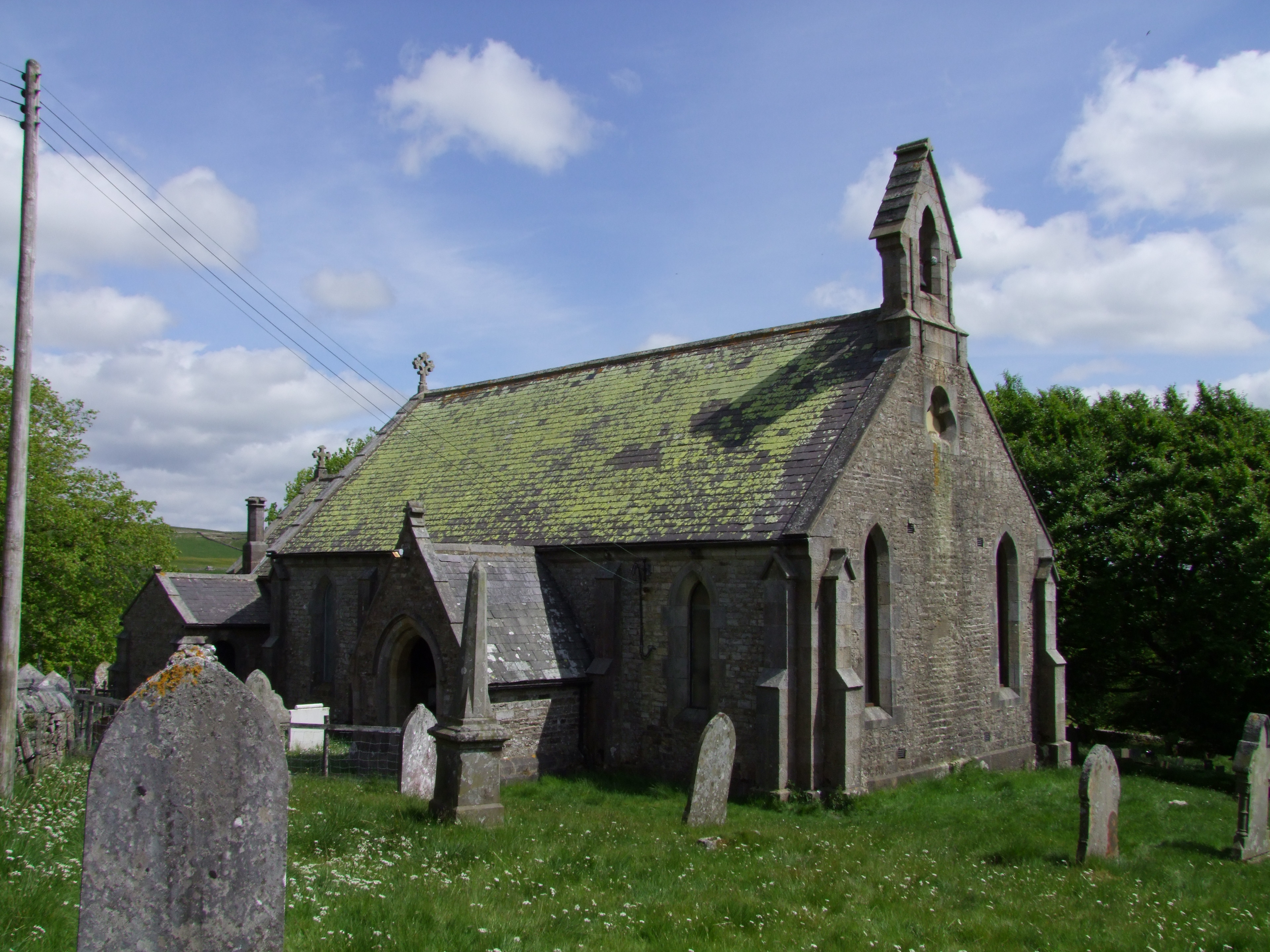
The church of St James the Less, seen in 2009

The church of St James the Less, Forest and Frith was built in 1845 and is off the B6277 road south of Langdon Beck.

The word "Forest" in the name means open land used for hunting, as in Royal forest and New Forest, and "frith" means woodland, as in Chapel en le Frith.
