= Margaret E. Bradshaw =

British botanist and conservationist (born 1926)

Margaret Elizabeth Bradshaw MBE
- Born: 4 January 1926 (age 100)
- Education: Durham University
- Known for: ecologist and conservationist
- Scientific career
- Thesis: (1959)
- Author abbrev. (botany): M.E.Bradshaw

Margaret Elizabeth Bradshaw, MBE (born January 1926) is an English botanist and conservationist. She has been a long term advocate and recorder of the flora of Upper Teesdale in County Durham. Her first book was published when she was 97.

== Early life and education ==
Margaret Elizabeth Bradshaw was born in January 1926, and lived with her family on a farm in East Yorkshire. She was interested in plants from childhood. Bradshaw attended school in Bridlington and later in Leeds. After training as a teacher in Leeds, she taught in Derbyshire and then in Bishop Auckland.

== Botanical career ==
Bradshaw has focused on the plants of Upper Teesdale since the 1950s, recording locations of the unusual species that are found there and on their conservation. In 1951 she identified large-toothed Lady's-mantle (Alchemilla subcrenata) in fields in Teesdale. She carried out research into the morphology and cytology of Lady's-mantles as a student at Durham University and was awarded a PhD in 1959. She worked in the Department of Extra-Mural Studies at Durham University from 1962 to 1983.

In the late 1960s, as part of the protest against construction of Cow Green Reservoir, the national importance of the flora of the Upper Teesdale became better known. It includes species that are otherwise alpines and the Teesdale violet (Viola rupestris). The land remaining around the reservoir was designated as the Moor House-Upper Teesdale National Nature Reserve, combining two previous nature reserves. In 1983 she moved to a farm in Devonshire and was employed to study the local rare plants by the Nature Conservancy Council. She returned to Teesdale in 1998 and continued to monitor plant populations there, also leading local volunteers. She has travelled around the area on horseback in her later years, having learned to ride when she was five.

== Awards and honours ==
Bradshaw was made a Member of the Order of the British Empire (MBE) in Queen Elizabeth II's 1977 Silver Jubilee and Birthday Honours, "for services to conservation in Durham". In 2010 she was awarded honorary membership of the Botanical Society of Britain and Ireland. The whitebeam Sorbus margaretae found in Devon, was named after her.

In 2012 Bradshaw was awarded the Marsh Botany Award in recognition of her lifetime contribution to the understanding and conservation of the Teesdale flora. In 2013, she was the recipient of the inaugural Pendlebury Award for her significant contribution to looking after the North Pennines Area of Outstanding Natural Beauty (AONB). In 2023 she was awarded the H. H. Bloomer award by the Linnean Society, and in 2024 she was awarded an honorary Doctor of Science by Durham University.

== Publications ==
In 2023 Teesdale''s Special Flora: Places, Plants and People, her first book, was published when she was 97. It was published by the Princetown University Press and contains 288 pages.

She also contributed a chapter about the flora and vegetation to a book published in 2018 about Upper Teesdale.— (2018). "5. Flora and Vegetation". In Durham Wildlife Trust (ed.). The Natural History of Upper Teesdale.
