= Moorhouse and Cross Fell =

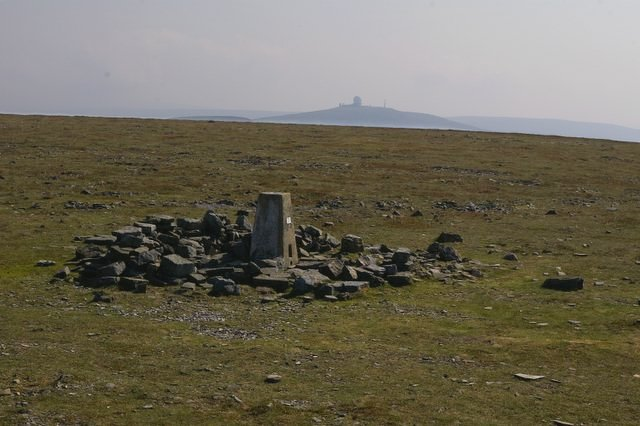
- Summit of Cross Fell, with Great Dun Fell in the distance

- Location within County Durham
- Location: MAGiC MaP
- Nearest town: Alston, Cumbria
- Coordinates: 54°43′N 2°23′W
- Area: 13,707 ha (52.92 sq mi)
- Established: 1951 / 1963
- Governing body: Natural England
- Website: Moorhouse and Cross Fell SSSI

Moorhouse and Cross Fell is a Site of Special Scientific Interest covering an extensive area of moorland in the Wear Valley district of west County Durham and the Eden district of Cumbria, England. It is contiguous with Upper Teesdale SSSI to the east and Appleby Fells SSSI to the south. The area covered extends roughly from an arc through the villages of Gamblesby, Leadgate and Garrigill southward as far as Milburn in the west and Cow Green Reservoir in the east. It includes the whole of Cross Fell, the summit of which, at 893 metres asl, is the highest point in the Pennines and in England outside the Lake District.

The area is important for its wide variety of upland habitats, especially blanket bog, sub-montane and montane heath, montane bryophyte heath, limestone grassland and flushes, and for the fauna and flora that they support. The site also includes a number of localities of geological interest.

== Ornithology ==
More than forty species of birds breed in the area, including several raptors—merlin, peregrine, common buzzard, common kestrel, short-eared owl—and waders—Eurasian golden plover, dunlin, common sandpiper, northern lapwing, Eurasian curlew, common redshank, and common snipe—whose survival is threatened; four (merlin, peregrine, golden plover and short-eared owl) are listed in Annex 1 of the European Commission's Birds Directive as requiring special protection and others (including lapwing and dunlin) are listed in the United Kingdom's Red Data Book (Birds).

== Flora and fauna ==
The invertebrate fauna is best known from studies conducted over many years at the Moor House NNR. The area shares many characteristics with the Cairngorms region of Scotland but there are some notable rarities, including a rove beetle, Olophrum assimile, which is known from only one other locality in Britain, a carabid beetle, Nebria nivalis, which has not been found anywhere else in the North Pennines and is known elsewhere in Britain only from North Wales, the Cairngorms and Scafell Pike, and a leiodid beetle, Hydnobius spinipes, which is known from only four other localities in Britain. In all, some 27 endangered species and over 70 nationally scarce species have been recorded from the Moor House reserve.

Although the area has a variety of habitats, it is the montane vegetation that is particularly notable. The summit of Cross Fell is dominated by a heath in which the moss Racromitium lanuginosum is dominant and is the most extensive area of such heath in England. Other notable montane and sub-montane species include hair sedge, Carex capillaris, northern bedstraw, Galium boreale, mountain everlasting, Antennaria dioica, and alpine forget-me-not, Myosotis alpestris.

== Geology ==
Within the site are five localities of geological interest, of which the following are particularly notable:

- Knock Fell Caverns — situated at the head of Knock Ore Gill, this is the most extensive maze cave system in Britain.
- Cross Fell — together with the Dun Fells and Knock Fell, this area is important both for its examples of periglacial landforms and because some periglacial processes are still active.

== SSSI history ==
In 1975, Moor House NNR was the first site in Britain to be declared a Biosphere Reserve by UNESCO.

Moorhouse and Cross Fell SSSI was created in 1990 as part of a substantial revision of existing SSSIs that had originally been notified under the National Parks and Access to the Countryside Act 1949. In the course of the revision, parts of the Cross Fell SSSI and Upper Teesdale and Appleby Fells SSSI were amalgamated with Moor House NNR to form the new Moorhouse and Cross Fell SSSI.

The site is within the North Pennines Area of Outstanding Natural Beauty. It is one of a group of SSSIs underlying the North Pennines Moors Special Protection Area designated in 2001 under the European Union Birds Directive.
