= Harwood, County Durham =

Village in County Durham, England

Coordinates: 54°41′N 2°16′W

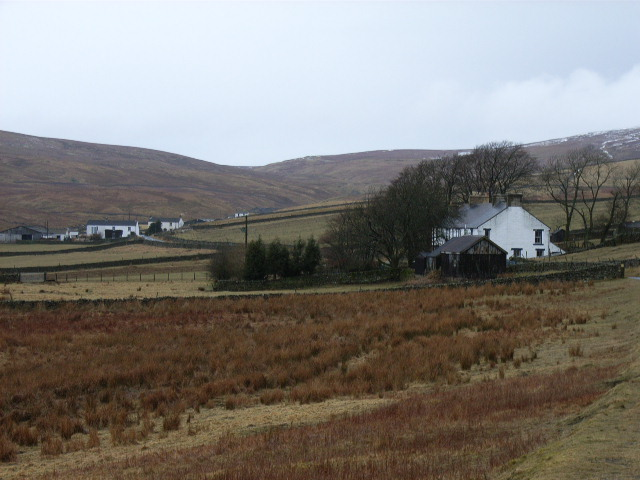
Cottages in Harwood (looking West to Herdship).

Harwood is a small valley and village near the head of Teesdale. Harwood Beck is a tributary of the River Tees in County Durham which forms a short valley, and the village is made of the scattered houses and farms which run the length of the valley. The valley forms part of the North Pennines AONB. Lying along the B6277, the village is 9 miles (14 km) north-west of Middleton-in-Teesdale and 21 miles (34 km) south-east of Alston in Cumbria. It is in the civil parish of Forest and Frith, and the Bishop Auckland parliamentary constituency.

There is a long history of lead mining in Harwood, which reached a peak in the late nineteenth century when a church (1849) and school (1853) were built. The buildings, long abandoned, can be still be seen today. To the west of Harwood, Cow Green Reservoir was constructed on former mining land in the 1960s, while Harwood Common rises above the valley to the north.
