= Park End Wood =

Protected area in County Durham, England

- Location within County Durham
- Location: MAGiC MaP
- Nearest town: Middleton-in-Teesdale
- Coordinates: 54°37′46″N 2°7′6″W
- Area: 10.33 ha (25.5 acres)
- Established: 1964
- Governing body: Natural England
- Website: Park End Wood SSSI

Park End Wood is a Site of Special Scientific Interest in the Teesdale district of west County Durham, England. The site occupies a low hill of Whin Sill on the southern edge of the River Tees floodplain just over 2 km upstream from the village of Middleton-in-Teesdale. It adjoins the Upper Teesdale SSSI to the south, and the Middle Crossthwaite and Stonygill Meadows SSSIs are nearby.

The hill slopes are wooded with downy birch, Betula pubescens, mixed with ash, Fraxinus excelsior, and rowan, Sorbus aucuparia, with an understorey of hazel, Corylus avellana, a species not usually associated with birch.

On the heavily grazed hill top is an acid grassland vegetation, in which Yorkshire fog, Holcus lanatus, common bent, Agrostis capillaris, and red fescue, Festuca rubra, are the predominant grasses.
