= John Harriman (botanist) =

English cleric and botanist (1760–1831)

John Harriman (1760–1831) was an English cleric and botanist.

== Life ==
Harriman was born at Maryport, Cumberland, into a family of German background named Hermann. became a medical student at 17; but after two years returned to classical studies, and then took holy orders. He became curate of Bassenthwaite in 1787. He moved on to Barnard Castle, Egglestone, and Gainford in County Durham, Long Horseley in Northumberland, Heighington and Croxdale, and lastly to the perpetual curacy of Satley, Durham.

Harriman concentrated on the botany of Teesdale. He published nothing, but maintained a correspondence with other botanists. He was knowledgeable about lichens and discovered species. He furnished plants for James Edward Smith's English Botany such as Bartsia alpina, which he had gathered in Teesdale. He was the first botanist to find Gentiana verna in England, and other rare plants in Westmorland and Cumberland. He sent a significant collection of lichens from Egglestone to Smith. He was a fellow of the Linnaean Society, and after his death, on 3 December 1831, at Croft in York, Smith, as president, called the microscopic dot lichen lichen Harrimanni.' Also Verrucaria harrimanii carries his name, given by Erik Acharius.

== Notes ==
Attribution

This article incorporates text from a publication now in the public domain: Stephen, Leslie; Lee, Sidney, eds. (1890). "Harriman, John". Dictionary of National Biography. Vol. 24. London: Smith, Elder & Co.
