= Bowlees =

Village in County Durham, England

Coordinates: 54°38′54″N 2°08′48″W

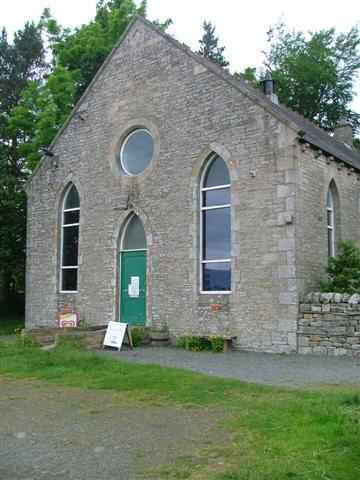
Bowlees Visitor Centre is based in a former Primitive Methodist chapel (photographed in 2005)

Bowlees is a small village in County Durham, England. It is situated near Newbiggin, on the other side of Teesdale from Holwick.

The visitor centre in the village was formerly run by the Durham Wildlife Trust. It is now managed by the North Pennines Area of Outstanding Natural Beauty (AONB) Partnership. In 2016, the visitor centre was named Small Visitor Attraction of the Year at the North East England Tourism Awards ceremony.
