= Bill Heal =

British environmental scientist (1934–2021)

Oliver William Heal FRSB (4 November 1934 ― 16 January 2021), known as Bill Heal, was a British environmental scientist. A specialist in soil science, Heal was one of the originators of the University of the Arctic.

== Biography ==
Born in Gateshead, Heal studied Natural Sciences at Durham University (BSc 1956, PhD 1959) and also studied under Muriel Robertson (the external examiner for his PhD) at the Lister Institute of Preventive Medicine. He researched soil microbes at Moor House-Upper Teesdale, the same location as his doctoral field work, and compared the surrounding climate to that of southern Iceland.

In 1974 he was appointed head of soil science at the Institute of Terrestrial Ecology (ITE) in Cambridge, where his research contributed to the International Biological Program (IBP). By 1982 Heal had become Director of ITE for the north of the UK.

A conversation with Lars-Erik Liljelund at a 1997 meeting of the Arctic Council led to the establishment of a new framework for arctic environmental research, the University of the Arctic, which was founded the following year as something that could "combine the limited resources of the eight Arctic countries" but not be limited itself by national policies and attitudes.
