= Swindale Beck (Dufton) =

Stream in Cumbria, England

Coordinates: 54.6508°N 2.4671°W

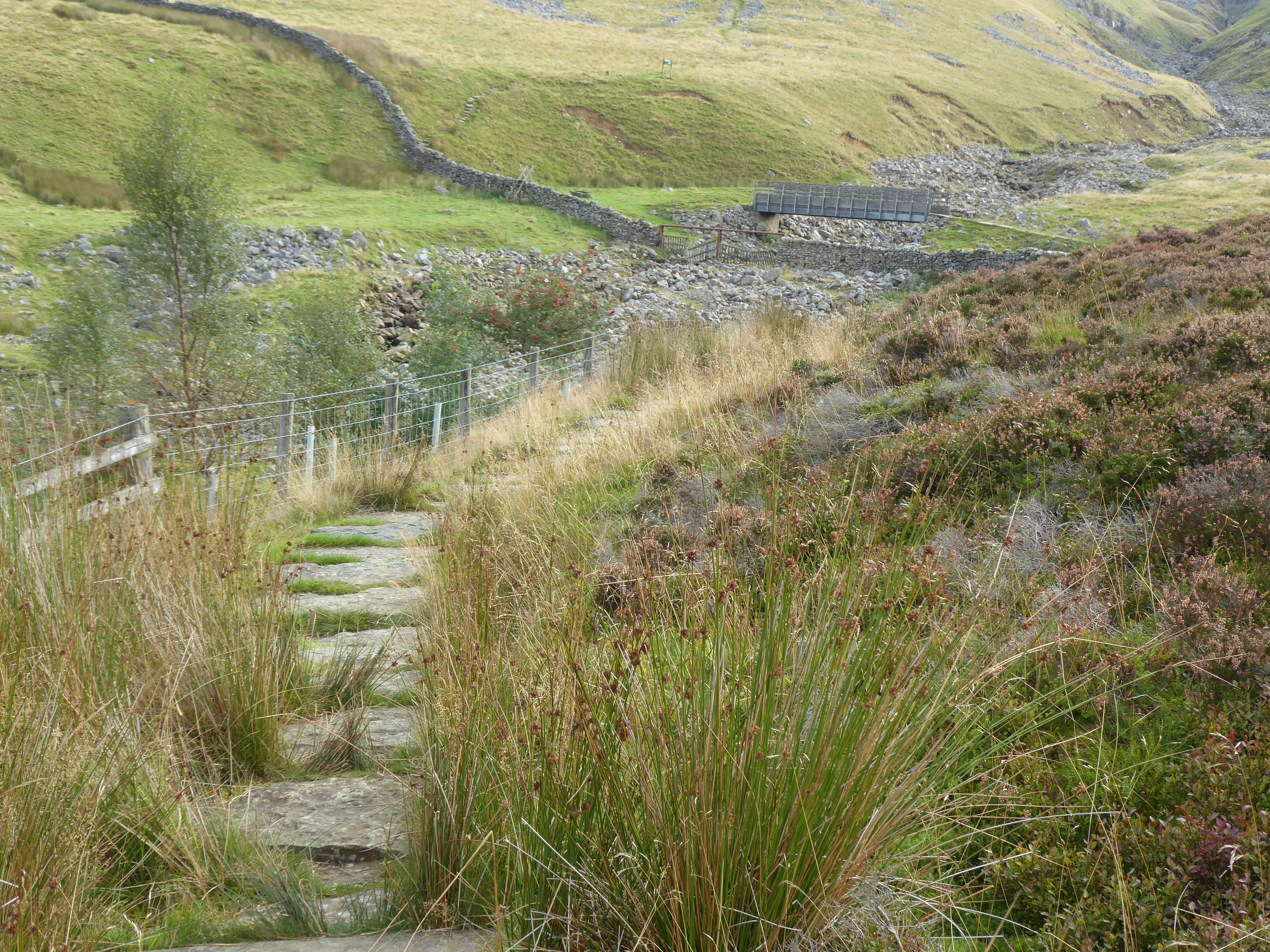
The Pennine Way following and crossing Swindale Beck, upstream from the listed packhorse bridge

Swindale Beck is an upland stream in Cumbria, England, which for much of its length forms the boundary between the civil parishes of Long Marton and Dufton in the Westmorland and Furness unitary authority area. It rises south of Knock Fell and flows into the Trout Beck at Long Marton to feed the River Eden. The eastern area of its catchment falls within the Appleby Fells which is a Site of Special Scientific Interest. It is crossed by a grade II listed packhorse bridge north east of Knock Pike. The Pennine Way crosses Swindale Beck on a footbridge, between Dufton and Knock Fell.
