= Knock Fell =

Hill in Cumbria, England

Coordinates: 54°39′59″N 2°26′00″W

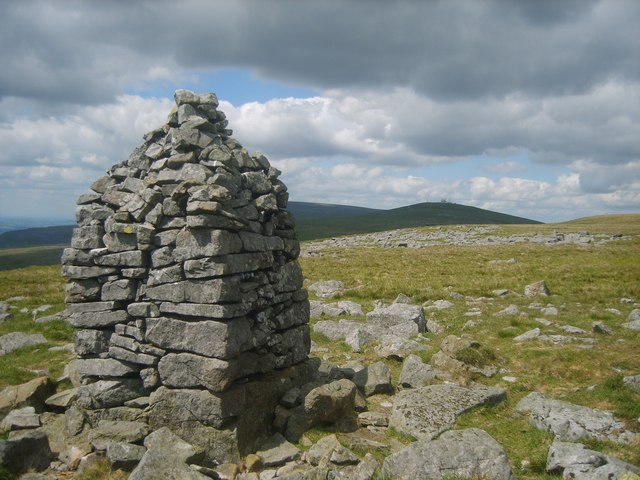
Knock Old Man, a cairn below the summit, to the south west

Knock Fell is a hill in Cumbria, England. It has a height of 794 m (2,605 ft) and a prominence of 50 m (160 ft), and thus is listed as a Hewitt, a Simm and a Nuttall.

The summit lies in the civil parish of Long Marton, but the boundary with the parish of Dufton is only a few metres to the south. There is a cairn, named Knock Old Man, a short distance below the summit, to the south west. There is a smaller cairn on the summit.

Knock Fell lies on the central watershed of England, in that it drains to the Solway Firth from its western slopes, where water of Swindale Beck and Milburn Beck flows into the River Eden, and into the North Sea from its eastern slopes, where Maize Beck and Trout Beck lead to the River Tees.

The Pennine Way National Trail crosses the summit of Knock Fell, en route from Dufton to Cross Fell, the highest point of the Pennines. There is no accommodation or other services between Dufton and Garrigill, and the section has been described as

... the toughest day on the Pennine Way. It’s the longest leg, it includes the highest point and more than 3,000 feet (1,000 metres) of ascent, up to the loftiest ground in England outside the Lake District. Plus route-finding can be tricky and some sections are exposed.

Knock Fell is within the Moor House-Upper Teesdale national nature reserve. Knock Hill Caverns, described as "Very confusing maze-cave", is a caving area beneath Knock Fell.
