= Teesdale Allotments =

- Location within County Durham
- Location: MAGiC MaP
- Nearest town: Middleton-in-Teesdale
- Coordinates: 54°39′23″N 2°6′33″W
- Area: 1,308.34 ha (5.0515 sq mi)
- Established: 1994
- Governing body: Natural England
- Website: Teesdale Allotments SSSI

Teesdale Allotments is a Site of Special Scientific Interest in the Teesdale district of County Durham, England. It consists of two large upland areas north of the Tees valley, one to the north and east of the village of Newbiggin, the other to the north-east of Middleton-in-Teesdale.

The area, which adjoins the Upper Teesdale SSSI, consists of enclosed upland grazings, and is of national importance for its bird populations. Species that breed in the area include Northern lapwing, common snipe, common redshank, Eurasian golden plover, black grouse and Eurasian curlew, all except the last of which are declining in numbers nationally. Densities of breeding waders are among the highest in Britain, with up to 90 pairs recorded from one 1 km square.

The black grouse population is particularly important: while this species has declined almost everywhere in England, and is now extinct in some former breeding areas, such as Dartmoor and Exmoor, the population in Teesdale has remained relatively stable, and the area now holds 30 percent of the English population, 7 percent of it in the Teesdale Allotments.

Other breeding birds include common teal, merlin, red grouse, short-eared owl, ring ouzel, and Northern wheatear, all of which are listed, or are candidates for listing, in the United Kingdom's Red Data Book (Birds). Three breeding species—merlin, golden plover and short-eared owl—are listed in Annex 1 of the European Commission's Birds Directive as requiring special protection.
