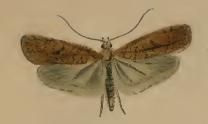

Scientific classification
- Kingdom: Animalia
- Phylum: Arthropoda
- Clade: Pancrustacea
- Class: Insecta
- Order: Lepidoptera
- Family: Depressariidae
- Genus: Agonopterix
- Species: A. carduella

Binomial name
- Agonopterix carduella (Hübner, 1817)

Synonyms
- Tinea carduella Haworth, 1817

= Agonopterix carduella =

Species of moth

Agonopterix carduella is a moth of the family Depressariidae. It is found from Great Britain, Germany and Estonia to the Iberian Peninsula, Sardinia, Italy and Montenegro.

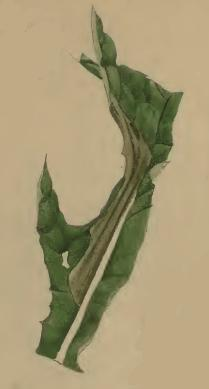
A mined leaf of Cirsium vulgare

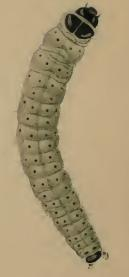
Larva

The wingspan is 14–17 mm. Adults are on wing from July to May.

The larvae feed on Arctium, Carduus defloratus, Centaurea jacea, Centaurea nigra, Cirsium arvense, Cirsium helenioides and Cirsium vulgare. They mine the leaves of their host plant. Larvae can be found from May to early July. The species overwinters as an adult.
