= Langdon Beck =

Hamlet in County Durham, England

Coordinates: 54.675°N 2.229°W

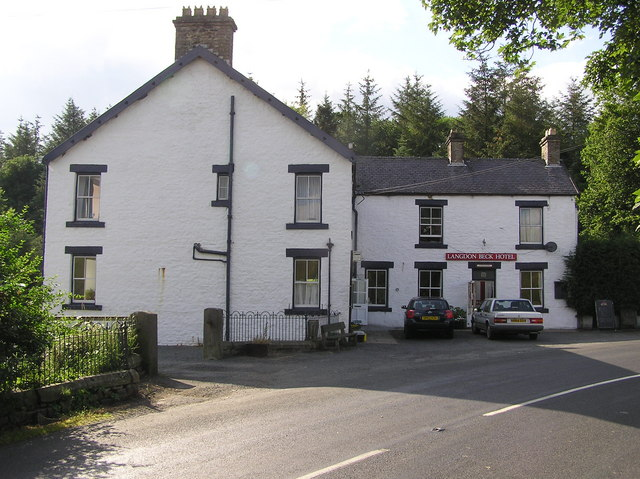
- Langdon Beck Hotel

- Location within County Durham
- Civil parish: Forest and Frith
- Unitary authority: County Durham
- Ceremonial county: Durham
- Region: North East
- Country: England
- Sovereign state: United Kingdom
- Police: Durham
- Fire: County Durham and Darlington
- Ambulance: North East

Langdon Beck is a hamlet in the civil parish of Forest and Frith, in County Durham, England. It is situated in upper Teesdale, between Forest-in-Teesdale and Harwood, halfway between Penrith and Durham. It is a stronghold for the black grouse, one of the few sites for them in the North of England.

== History ==
Historically, Langdon Beck hosted one of the largest agricultural shows in North Teesdale. However the shows abruptly stopped in the early 20th century for an unknown reason. In 2000, they were revived as an annual event. Prizes were traditionally awarded by John Vane, 11th Baron Barnard until his death in 2016. The newly revived event has taken place annually except in 2001 due to the 2001 United Kingdom foot-and-mouth outbreak. During the outbreak, there was concern that Langdon Beck's only hostel could close due to lack of tourism. It received a grant of £1,000 from Teesdale District Council for solar power with extra funding from Durham County Council. Langdon Beck's War Memorial to soldiers from the village who fought in the First World War is located at St James the Less Church.

Langdon Beck has a geological feature called Cronkley Scar, which is a Whin Sill boulder scree formed from molten magma pushing up marble through igneous rock over millions of years. Langdon Beck is used as the base of a start of several hiking trails. The hamlet features the only major concentration of black grouse in England. Climbing the fells during winter is viewed as hazardous when there is snow on the ground.
