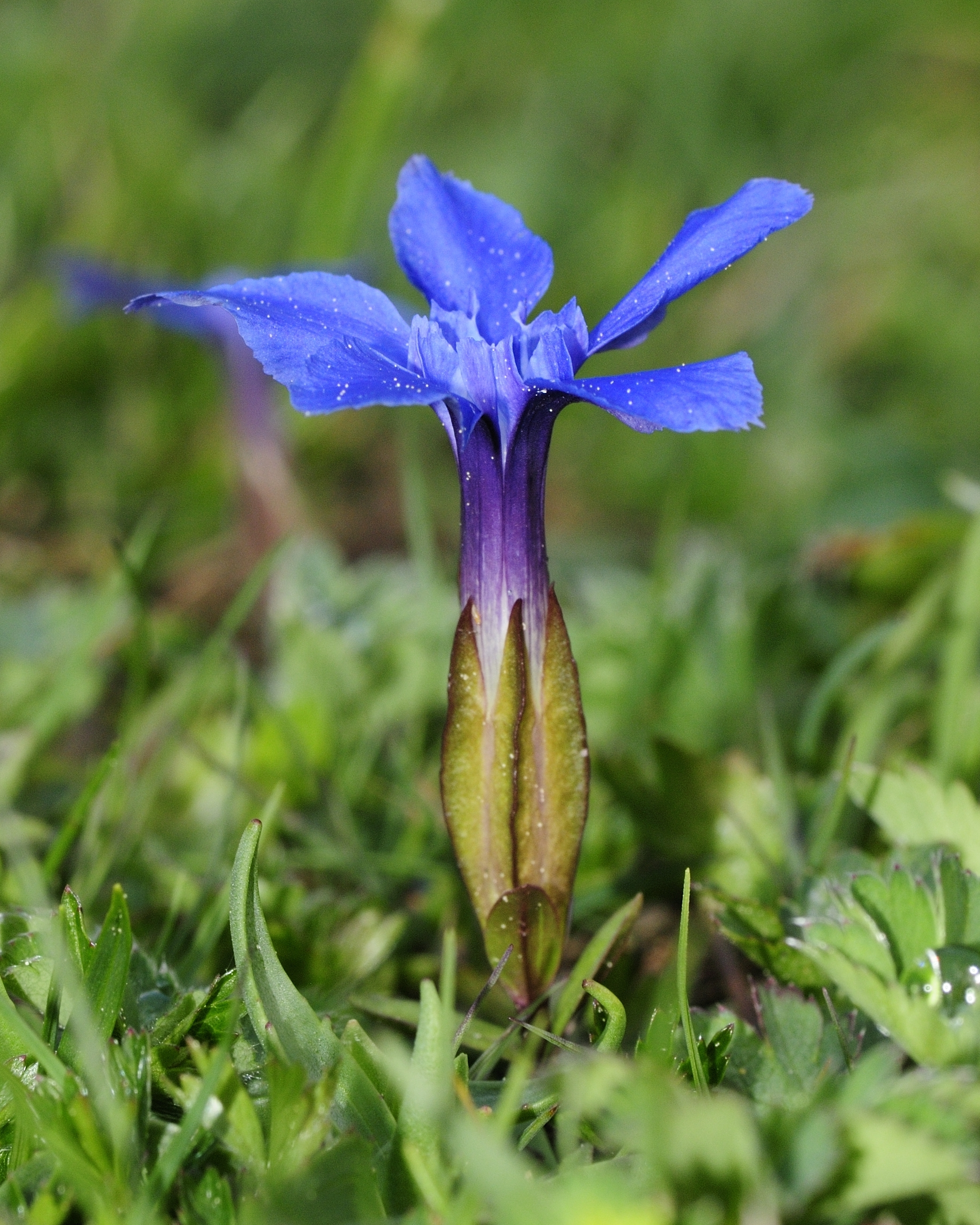

Scientific classification
- Kingdom: Plantae
- Clade: Tracheophytes
- Clade: Angiosperms
- Clade: Eudicots
- Clade: Asterids
- Order: Gentianales
- Family: Gentianaceae
- Genus: Gentiana
- Species: G. verna

Binomial name
- Gentiana verna L.

= Gentiana verna =

Species of flowering plant in the gentian family

Gentiana verna, the spring gentian, is a species of flowering plant in the family Gentianaceae, and one of its smallest members, normally only growing to a height of a few centimetres.

The short stem supports up to three opposing pairs of elliptical or lanceolate leaves. The conspicuous vivid blue (sometimes purplish-red or rarely white) flowers are 1–2 cm in diameter, with a deeply five-lobed corolla; they are produced in late spring to early summer. The flowers attract butterflies and bees (particularly bumblebees) for pollination. Ants are responsible for the spreading of its seeds.

== Distribution ==
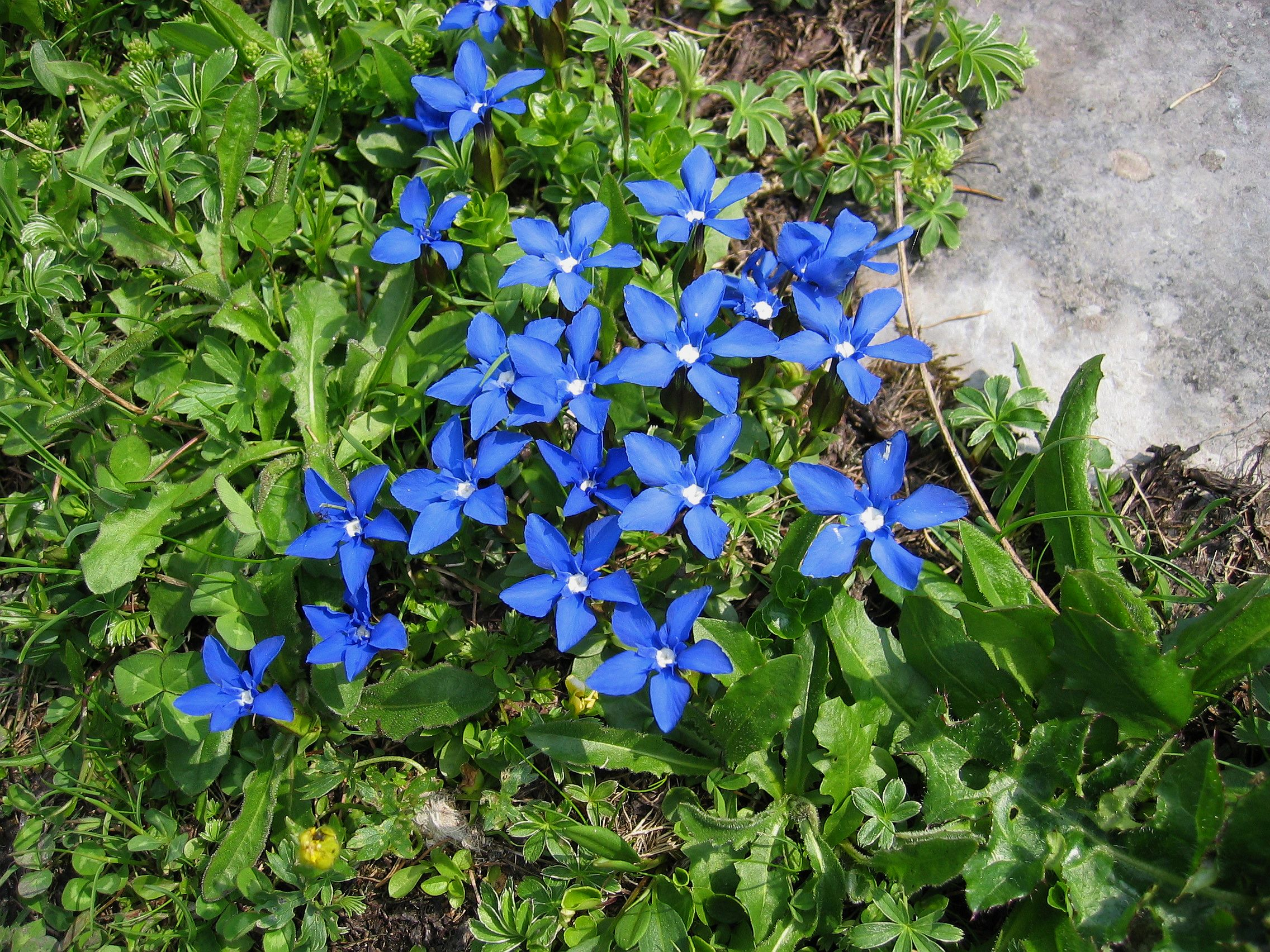
Gentiana verna flowers near Liezener Hütte, Styria, Austria

G. verna is one of the most widespread gentians, found on sunny alpine meadows throughout Eurasia, from Ireland to Russia. It is common in central and southeastern Europe, such as in low mountain ranges like the Jura Mountains and Balkans, and up to an altitude of 2,600 m (8,500 ft). It is also to be found in mountainous regions ranging from the High Atlas of Morocco to the mountains of Turkey, Iraq and Iran. In northern Europe, it is very rare, confined to Teesdale in northern England and a handful of locations in western Ireland. It tends to thrive on dry meadows with chalky soil; it is also known to grow in silicaceous soils and grows as a perennial hemicryptophyte. Its scarcity has led to protection in a number of European countries as an endangered species.

== Symbolism ==
It is the county flower of Durham in the United Kingdom. It was first found in Britain by the botanist John Harriman.

A drawing of Gentiana verna by Holly Somerville is the logo for the botany department in Trinity College Dublin.

Gentiana verna appeared on the design of a Great Britain stamp, issued in 1964 to mark the 10th International Botanical Congress held in Edinburgh.

Writer and botanist Stevan Jakovljević eulogized the flower in its Latin name at the end of his trilogy Srpska trilogija which writes of the Serbian soldiers who died during the Battle of Kajmakčalan and the Macedonian front during World War I (the flower grows on the soldiers' graves in the mountains of Kajmakčalan).

The flower is associated with the Alps, and gave its name to the trans-Alpine Blauer Enzian ("Blue Gentian") express train between Germany and Austria.
