= Holwick =

Hamlet in County Durham, England

Coordinates: 54.63762°N 2.14842°W

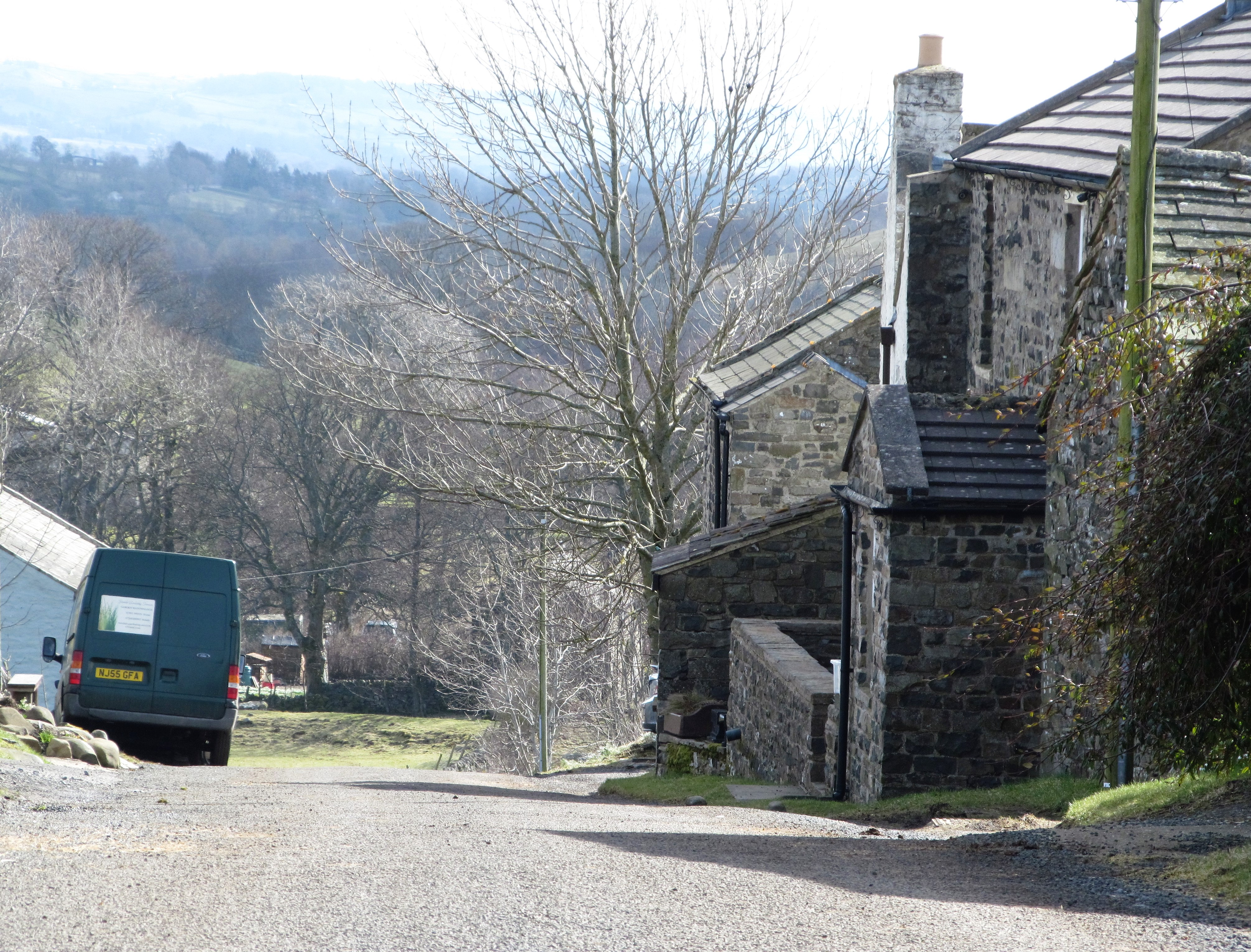

- Location within County Durham
- Population: 75 (2021 census)
- OS grid reference: NY905269
- Civil parish: Holwick
- Unitary authority: County Durham
- Ceremonial county: County Durham
- Region: North East
- Country: England
- Sovereign state: United Kingdom
- Post town: Barnard Castle
- Postcode district: DL12
- Police: Durham
- Fire: County Durham and Darlington
- Ambulance: North East
- UK Parliament: Bishop Auckland

Holwick is a hamlet and civil parish in Teesdale, County Durham (district), England. Located in the Pennine hills, the hamlet consists of a few houses spread along a road in the pattern of a linear settlement. The population of the parish taken at the 2021 Census was 75.

Being south of the River Tees, Holwick lies within the historic boundaries of the North Riding of Yorkshire. Along with the rest of the former Startforth Rural District it was transferred to County Durham for administrative and ceremonial purposes on 1 April 1974, under the provisions of the Local Government Act 1972. In May 2013, the newly registered flag of the North Riding was first unveiled at the village, owing to its being one of the most northerly settlements in Yorkshire.

It has a public house, the Strathmore Arms, named after local landowner, Lord Strathmore, who owned Holwick Hall. New York businessman Harry Payne Whitney leased Holwick Hall for a grouse shooting party on the moors in 1911, while in 1923 the future King George VI and Queen Elizabeth holidayed at the hall.

== Geography ==
Holwick sits not far from the south bank of the River Tees, about 2 miles north-west of Middleton-in-Teesdale and opposite Newbiggin, both villages on the other side of the river. The village itself is situated along Holwick Beck, a tributary of the Tees. The Tees forms almost all the northern parish boundary; the River Lune its eastern and Blea Beck its western. Bleabeck Force is a series of waterfalls along Blea Beck before it joins the Tees opposite Force Garth Quarry. Nearby are the High Force and Low Force waterfalls. The surrounding landscape is high moorland and fells.

== History ==
The earliest evidence of habitation in the area comes from Mesolithic microliths dating back at least 6000 years. The people who left them, however, were not settled in the area, but hunted there during the summer. Agriculture began in the Neolithic period, and the remains of a Bronze Age hut circle and burial cairns are on Holwick Fell. Evidence of a native settlement in Roman times in the form of groups of circular huts and field system has been found west of the Wynch Bridge. The present-day village of Holwick was first recorded in 1235. The origin of the name is uncertain, but believed to mean either "dairy farm in a hollow" or "in the holly". In addition to hill farming of sheep, lead mining and iron smelting was conducted in the mediæval period, with lead mining and stone quarrying increasing in importance throughout Teesdale in the 18th century. The Wynch Bridge, thought to be the first suspension bridge in Britain, was built across the Tees near Holwick in 1704, and collapsed in 1802, killing one. It was repaired but finally replaced in 1830. A map of the area surveyed in 1854 notes a chapel of ease and school as well as a Primitive Methodist chapel. There are also wells, a pinfold, and two foot bridges over Holwick Beck. The surrounding area contains numerous sheep pastures as well as several limestone and sandstone quarries and lead mines. The names of nearby farms include Cross House, Pikestone House, Castle House, Mizzes House, Mire House, Hield House, Westclose House, Low Way, and Hungry. Substantial quarrying and lead mining did not continue into the 20th century, and the economy of the village has since returned to sheep farming.

== Administration ==
Holwick has a parish meeting rather than a parish council, owing to its small electorate.

The parish falls within the Barnard West electoral division of County Durham district and Bishop Auckland UK Parliament constituency.

The local police force is Durham Constabulary. Holwick is in the Wear and Tees division and its nearest police station is in Barnard Castle.
