= Wynch Bridge =

Bridge on the River Tees

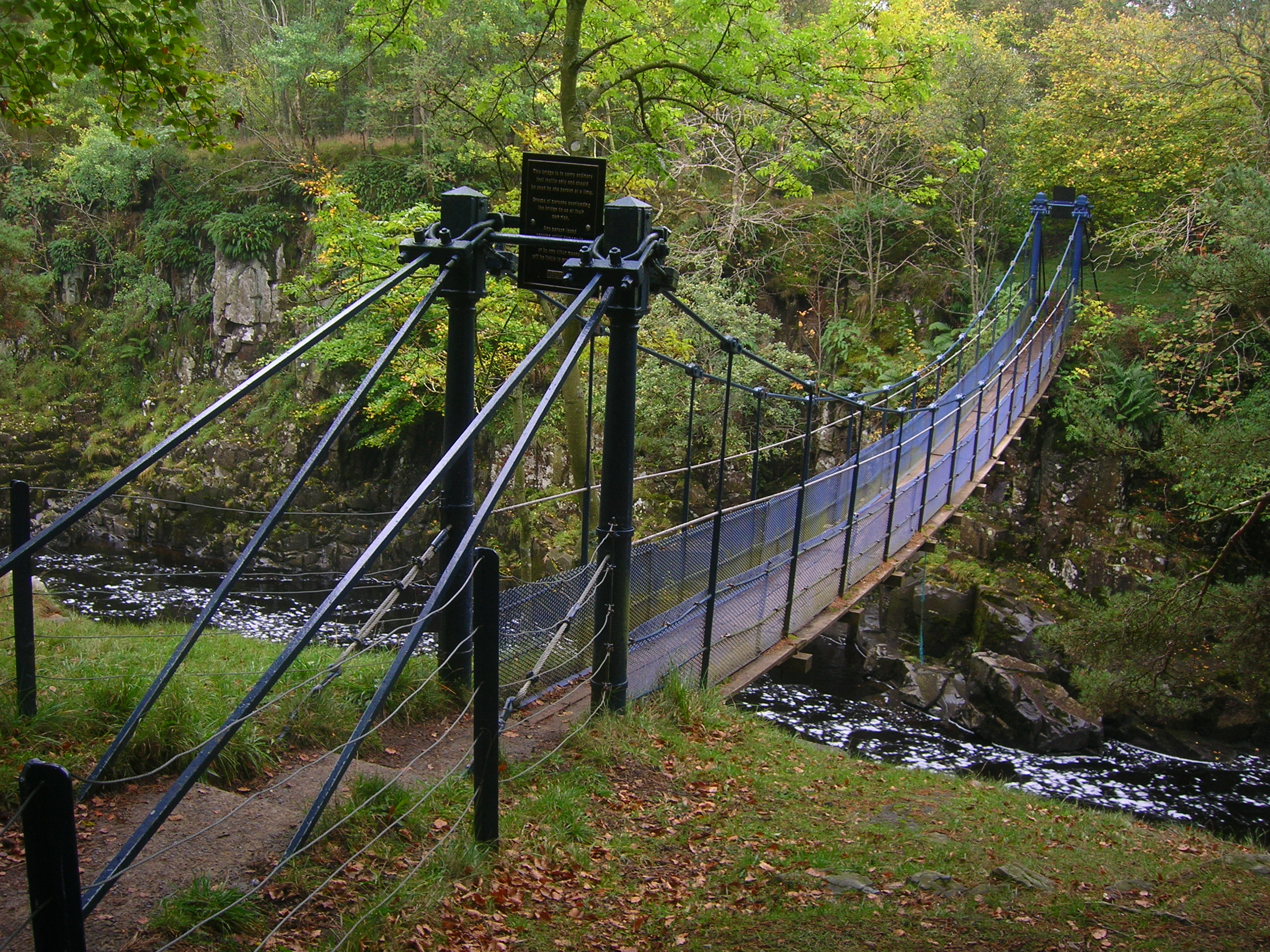
- Coordinates: 54°38′46″N 2°9′2″W
- OS grid reference: NY904279
- Crosses: River Tees
- Locale: Bowlees, County Durham; Holwick, North Yorkshire; Low Force
- Heritage status: Grade II* listed
- Historic England numbers: 1121562
- Preceded by: Holwick Head Bridge
- Followed by: Scoberry Bridge

History
- Built: 1741
- Rebuilt: 1830

Location
- Interactive map of Wynch Bridge

Wynch Bridge or Winch Bridge is a suspension bridge over the River Tees. The original Wynch Bridge was said to be the first suspension bridge in Britain, being built in 1741.

== Design ==
To persons accustomed to it, it is a very safe passage, but to strangers it is tremendous. At every step, the chains and their superstructure yield and spring, and there is no safeguard for the passenger but a small hand rail, which if leaned against gives the bridge a swinging motion, whilst beneath you yawns a black and horrid chasm, 60ft in depth, where the torrent rushes with a mighty noise amongst broken rocks.

— William Hutchinson, 1776

The original Bridge comprised a single span of 60 feet (18 m) with a width of two feet (61 cm) and the deck laid directly upon 2 chains, 21 inches (53 cm) apart. It was restrained by further chains connecting the deck to the rock faces of the 60ft deep chasm below. It had only one hand rail, when first constructed but was given two after the damage of the 1774 flood.

== History ==
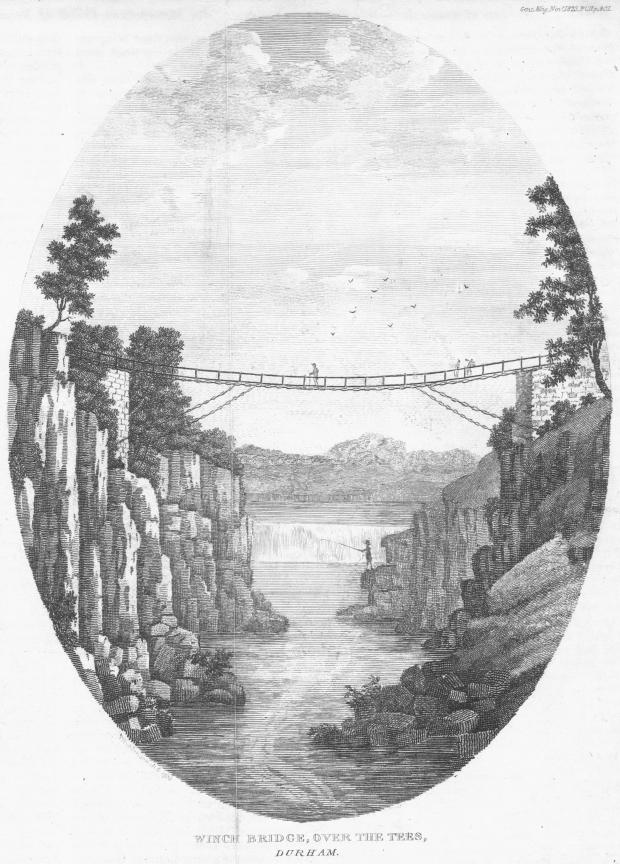
The original Wynch Bridge, in 1823.

The bridge was built in 1741 for use by lead-miners, wishing to cross between Holwick and Bowlees. Tradition holds, that it was the Holwick miners, employed at the Read-grove and Pike-Law lead mines, who constructed the bridge. One suggestion is that inspiration came from descriptions of suspension bridges found in the Himalayas. It is believed that this would make it the first suspension bridge in Britain, and only the second in Europe, after the first in Saxony was built 7 years earlier.

In the Great Flood of 1771 the south end of the bridge was lifted from its moorings. It was repaired, although no details of its repair have been located. It was repaired again in 1802, after one of the chains broke causing the death of 2 people. The bridge continued in use until a similar replacement was erected in 1830. This replacement was financed by the Marquess of Cleveland, and was moved ten metres (33 ft) further downstream from Low Force, with more substantial metal pillars holding the chains to the rock.

An inspection in 2018 lead to safety fears due to the condition of suspension hangers, and the bridge closed for 2 months in 2019 to undertake urgent repairs, with decking and suspension joints being fixed.

== See also ==
- List of crossings of the River Tees
- Grade II* listed buildings in County Durham
