= Kirkcarrion =

Hilltop tumulus and copse in County Durham, England

Coordinates: 54.6094°N 2.0958°W

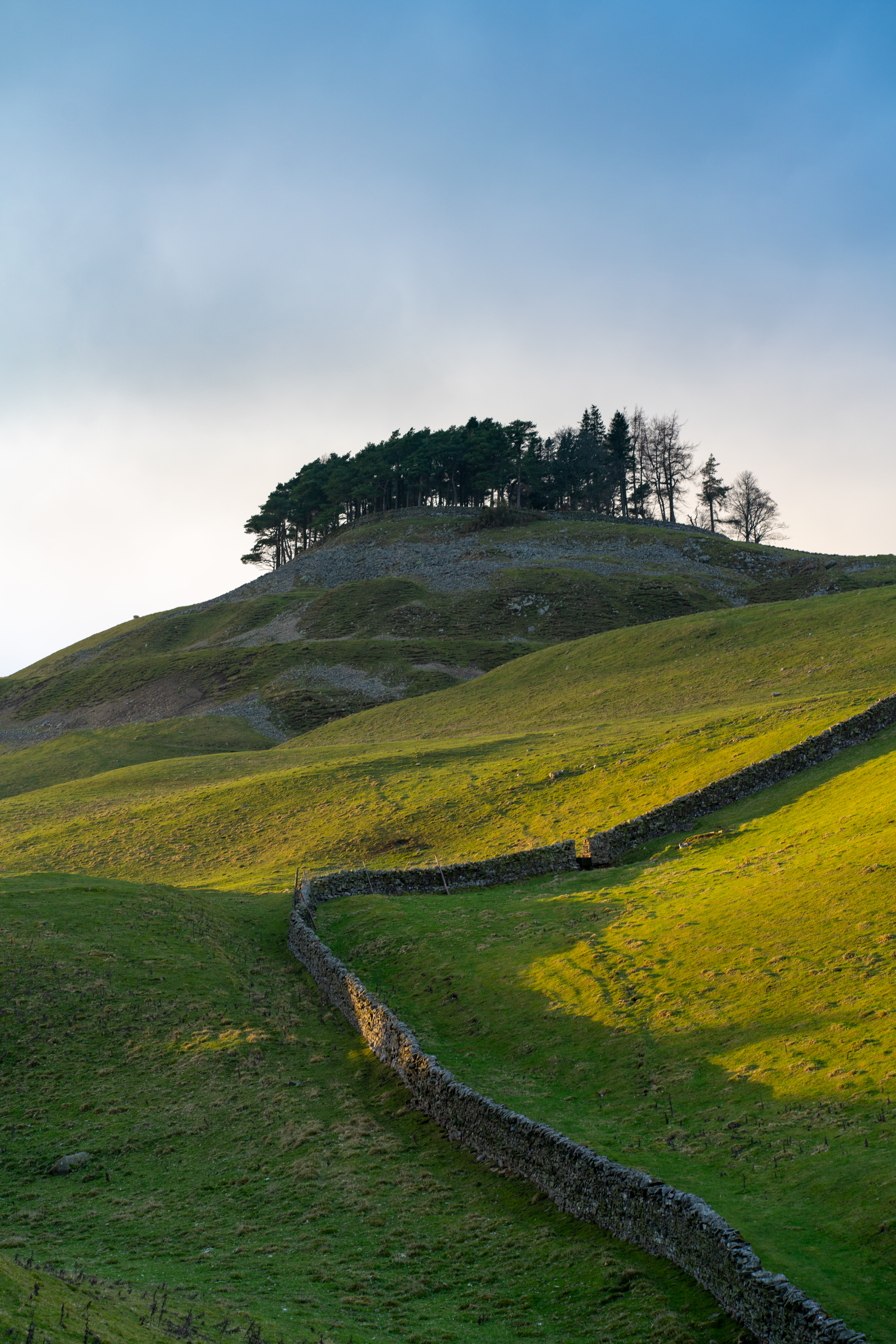
Kirkcarrion

Kirkcarrion is a copse of pine trees, surrounded by a stone wall, on a hilltop near Middleton-in-Teesdale, County Durham, England. The trees, which were planted in Victorian times, cover a tumulus which is reputed to be the burial place of a Bronze Age chieftain, Prince Caryn, who ruled before the days of the Romans. The site is a Bronze Age round barrow on the top of Lunedale Ridge, where it looms over the small town of Middleton-in-Teesdale some 400 feet below.

The name Kirkcarrion is conjectured to derive from Carreg Caryn, or "burial mound of Caryn". Kirkcarrion is also sometimes referred to as "Caryn's Castle", a name for which Caer Caryn might be a potential rendering in Brythonic.

It has been suggested that Caryn was a Brigantean chief, although this seems unlikely, as the Brigantes were a tribe of the later Iron Age. Excavations in the 19th century are said to have yielded a cist burial and a funerary urn with charred bones inside. The artifacts, the current whereabouts of which is uncertain, are thought to have ended up in the possession of Lord Strathmore, who subsequently built walls around the site and planted the trees within.

One legend states that within the circle of trees is a spot where no wind blows, no matter how inclement the weather.
