= Appleby Fells =

Protected area in Cumbria, England

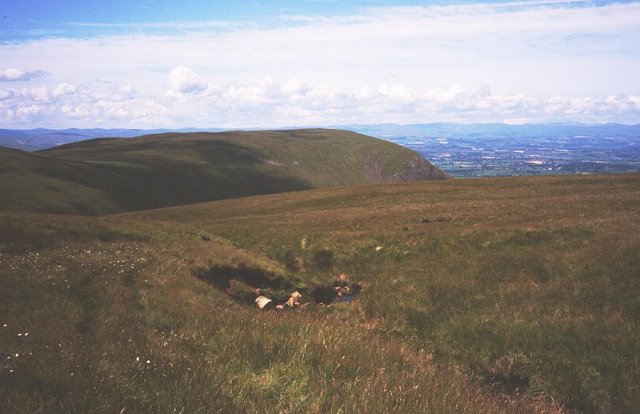
- Part of the SSSI - looking from Burton Fell towards Roman Fell

- Location within the former Eden District Location within Cumbria
- Location: Eden, Cumbria, North West England
- Coordinates: 54°37′12″N 2°22′21″W
- Area: 10,634.7 ha (41.061 sq mi)
- Established: 1951
- Governing body: Natural England
- Website: Map of site

Appleby Fells is a Site of Special Scientific Interest in Westmorland and Furness, Cumbria, England, near Appleby-in-Westmorland. The area is approximately a triangle with a right angle in the North East at Cow Green Reservoir. It extends westwards to near Knock and southwards to near Helbeck. The area overlaps the North Pennines AONB. The fells rise steeply above the Eden Valley, the scarp slope being deeply dissected by streams. Natural England states that "the great importance of the area lies in its rich variety of habitats and associated plant and animal species" and that "geologically there are important exposures of the Great Whin Sill quartz dolerite". According to data from Natural England the condition of 93% of the SSSI is designated "Unfavourable Recovering" and less than 5% is "Favourable".

Part of the land area designated as Appleby Fells SSSI is owned by the Ministry of Defence. The protected area includes part of Warcop Training Area.

== Flora ==
There is blanket bog above about 540 m (1,770 ft), a mire dominated by hares-tail cotton grass and heather. Some peaty pools exist with Sphagnum mosses in hummocks and some bog asphodel and round-leaved sundew. In places there are carboniferous limestone crags and the grassland here is dominated by sheep's fescue, with some crested hair-grass and blue moor-grass. Forbs here include typical limestone species such as wild thyme, mountain pansy, mossy saxifrage, moonwort, limestone bedstraw, alpine scurvy-grass, alpine forget-me-not and spring gentian.

The scree areas have a different flora, and the inaccessible ledges on the crags, and in the cracks in the limestone pavement of Middle Fell and Musgrave Scar, have some taller plants such as, Pimpinella saxifraga, mountain St-John's wort, vernal sandwort, alpine pennycress, hoary whitlow grass, lesser meadow rue and the uncommon Pyrenean scurvy-grass. On the acidic eastern slopes of the escarpment there is heathland dominated by bilberry and crowberry Vaccinium-Empetrum.

== Fauna ==
The pools and tarns provide habitat for waders including golden plover, dunlin, snipe, oystercatcher, common sandpiper and redshank, and there are also birds of prey such as merlin, peregrine falcon, raven and barn owl. Mine shafts are used by hibernating Brandt's bats and whiskered bats.

== Watercourses ==
The becks on the Appleby Fells provide headwaters for several catchments:

- Burthwaite Beck
- Cow Green Reservoir
- Hilton Beck
- Long Grain
- Low Gill (Crooks Beck)
- Lune from Source to Long Grain
- Maize Beck
- Swindale Beck, Dufton
- Swindale Beck Brough
- Tees from Trout Beck to Maize Beck
- Trout Beck Murton

== Monuments ==
English Heritage data shows that the area includes nine scheduled monuments including prehistoric stone hut circles, field systems, cairns, shielings, and a Romano-British farmstead. It also includes the Scordale Lead Mines.
