= Forest-in-Teesdale =

Village in County Durham, England

Coordinates: 54.664°N 2.206°W

- Location within County Durham
- OS grid reference: NY867298
- Unitary authority: County Durham
- Ceremonial county: County Durham
- Region: North East
- Country: England
- Sovereign state: United Kingdom
- Post town: BARNARD CASTLE
- Postcode district: DL12
- Dialling code: 01833
- Police: Durham
- Fire: County Durham and Darlington
- Ambulance: North East
- UK Parliament: Bishop Auckland

Forest-in-Teesdale is a village in County Durham, England. It is situated in upper Teesdale, on the north side of the Tees between Newbiggin and Langdon Beck, and is in the civil parish of Forest and Frith.

Forest-in-Teesdale holds the UK record for the greatest snow depth in an inhabited area with 211 cm (83 in) which occurred on 14 March 1947.
