= Warcop Training Area =

UK Ministry of Defence military training area near the village of Warcop in Cumbria

- Warcop
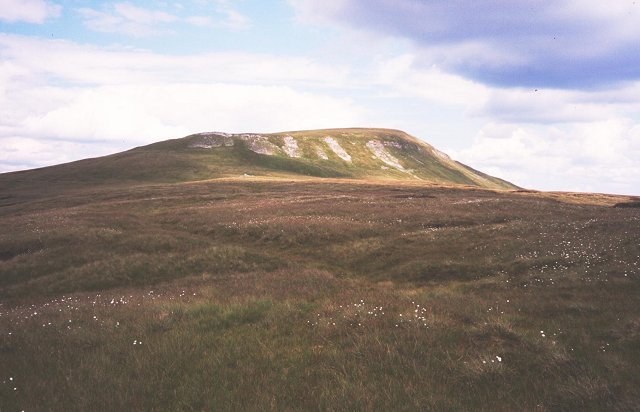
- Mickle Fell

Site information
- Type: Training Area
- Owner: Ministry of Defence
- Operator: British Army

Location
- Location within Cumbria
- Coordinates: 54°37′02″N 02°22′53″W

Site history
- Built: 1942
- Built for: War Office
- In use: 1942-Present

The Warcop Training Area (WTA) is a UK Ministry of Defence military training area near the village of Warcop in Cumbria. Part of the Defence Training Estate, the area consists of approximately 24,000 acres (9,700 ha) of MoD freehold land.

== History ==
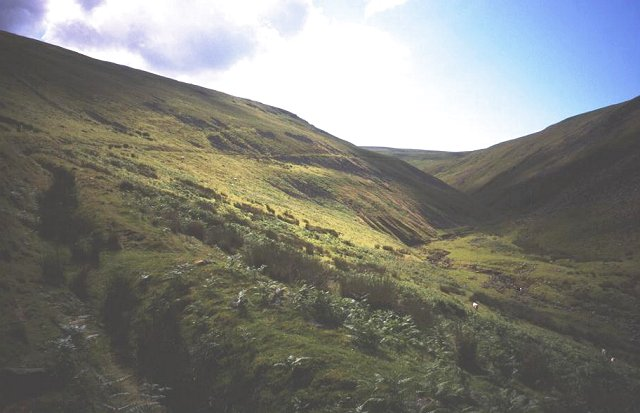
Swindale, a steep-sided valley behind Roman Fell. The old track is a bridleway, but is usually closed due to activities on the Warcop ranges.

The training estate was established in 1942 originally as a tank gunnery range and tanks still use it to this day.

On 19 October 1944 a Short Stirling bomber (LK 488), crashed on Mickle Fell whilst on a training flight from its base at RAF Wratting Common in Cambridgeshire; of the seven crew, only one survived.

On 22 April 1999 a soldier died when a grenade exploded in his pocket.

On 4 June 2014, one soldier died and two others were injured in a training accident when a military vehicle rolled over.

== Coverage of the training area ==
Within the training area are Little Fell (745m) and Mickle Fell (790m), Burton Fell, Warcop Fell, Cronkley Fell and part of Murton Fell.

Most of the training area is in Cumbria but a portion is County Durham. The area forms part of the North Pennines Area of Outstanding Natural Beauty and about two-thirds of the area falls inside the Appleby Fells Site of Special Scientific Interest.

== Army use ==
Warcop Training Area is used six and a half days a week by the Infantry Training Centre at Catterick Garrison, other regular British Army and Army Reserves using the Warcop Training Camp.
