= Holly Somerville =

Botanical artist, illustrator and teacher

- Born: Dublin, Ireland
- Occupation: Artist
- Writing career
- Subject: Botanical art

Holly Somerville is an Irish botanical artist, illustrator and teacher. She has worked for Trinity College, Dublin, and produced the botanical illustrations for the seventh edition of David Webb's An Irish Flora.

== Career ==
Born Holly Nixon in Dublin and went to St Columba's College, Dublin. Somerville was educated at Oxford where she completed a master's degree in plant sciences at Somerville College. She then completed her education in Edinburgh College of Art with a BA in illustration and photography. Post college in 1994 she was employed by the Botany Department in Trinity College, Dublin to assist with specimen illustration.

== Exhibitions ==
- 2017, 2016 Water Colour Society of Ireland Annual Exhibition
- 2017, 2016, 2015, 2014, 2013 Botanical Art in Bloom
- 2017 Eireannach, National Botanic Gardens, Glasnevin, Dublin
- 2016, 2015, 2013, 2011 Royal Hibernian Academy Annual Exhibition
- 2016 Plandaí Oidreachta, Irish Heritage Plants, National Botanic Gardens, Glasnevin, Dublin
- 2016 Art in the Garden Exhibition, Tourin House, County Waterford
- 2016 New Little Habitats, Ballydorn, County Down, Northern Ireland
- 2015, 2013 Galway Garden Festival Botanical Art Exhibition, Claregalway Castle
- 2014 Aibitir: the Irish Alphabet in Botanical Art, National Botanic Gardens, Dublin
- 2010 Grangecon Cafe, Blessington, County Wicklow (solo)
- 2001 The Garden House, Enniskerry, County Wicklow (solo)
- 1999 The Kennedy Gallery, Dublin (solo)
- 1999 Exhibition of National Trust Paintings, Ulster Museum, Belfast
- 1998 Ulster Cancer Foundation Annual Exhibition, Belfast
- 1998 Gloucestershire Society for Botanical Illustration Annual Exhibition, Corinium Museum, Cirencester, UK
- 1996 Royal Ulster Academy Summer Exhibition, Ulster Museum, Belfast
- 1996 Artists' Day on Botanical Illustration, Botany Department, Oxford University, UK
- 1995 The Bay Tree Gallery, Holywood, County Down (solo)
- 1994 Malone House, Summer Exhibition, Belfast

Her work is on display in The National Trust, and Trinity College, Dublin. She is a Fellow of the Ballinglen Arts Foundation, Ballycastle, County Mayo.

== Awards ==
2015 Somerville won three medals for her work in Bloom.

== Personal life ==
Holly was married in 1999 to James Somerville with whom she has three daughters.
