= Nebria nivalis =

Scientific classification
- Kingdom: Animalia
- Phylum: Arthropoda
- Clade: Pancrustacea
- Class: Insecta
- Order: Coleoptera
- Suborder: Adephaga
- Family: Carabidae
- Genus: Nebria
- Species: N. nivalis

Binomial name
- Nebria nivalis (Paykull, 1790)

Synonyms
- Carabus nivalis Paykull, 1790; Nebria obscuripes Poppius, 1906; Nebria femorata Motschulsky, 1866; Nebria molbis Motschulsky, 1866; Nebria mollis Motschulsky, 1866; Nebria femoralis Motschulsky, 1859; Nebria bifaria Mannerheim, 1853

Species of beetle

Nebria nivalis is a ground beetle in the subfamily Nebriinae. It is found mainly in Scandinavia and northern Russia; it is rare in the British Isles, where it occurs at isolated upland locations in North Wales, northern England, Scotland and the west of Ireland.

In Scandinavia, N. nivalis is found almost exclusively around the margins of snowfields. In the Scottish Cairngorms it has been observed foraging on snow, especially at night.

== Subspecies ==
- Nebria nivalis nivalis (Great Britain, Norway, Sweden, Finland, USA, Russia, Mongolia, Alaska, Greenland) - Snow gazelle beetle
- Nebria nivalis gaspesiana Kavanaugh, 1979 (Labrador, Newfoundland, Quebec, Maine) - Gaspe gazelle beetle

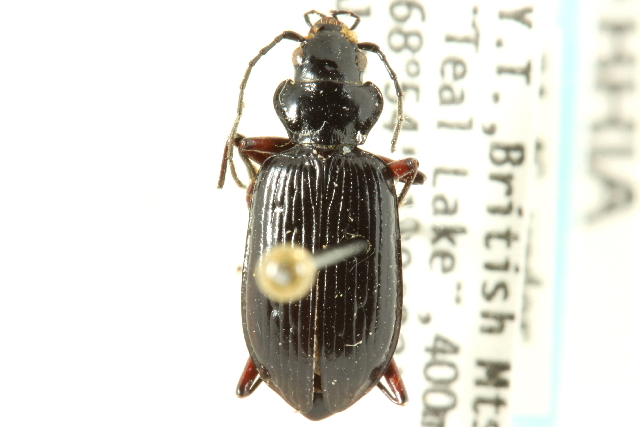
Nebria nivalis gaspesiana

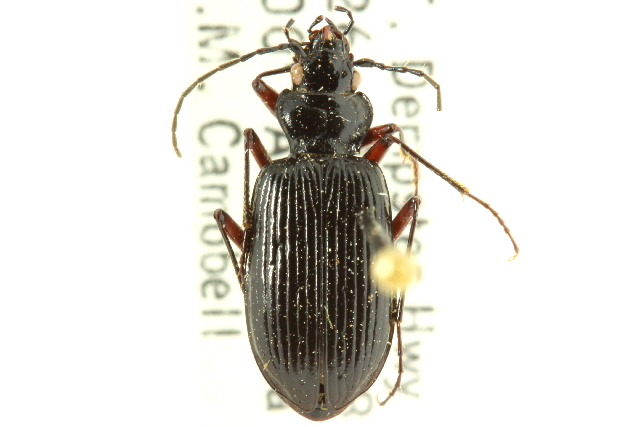
Nebria nivalis nivalis
