= Eggleston =

Village in County Durham, England

Coordinates: 54.608°N 2.003°W

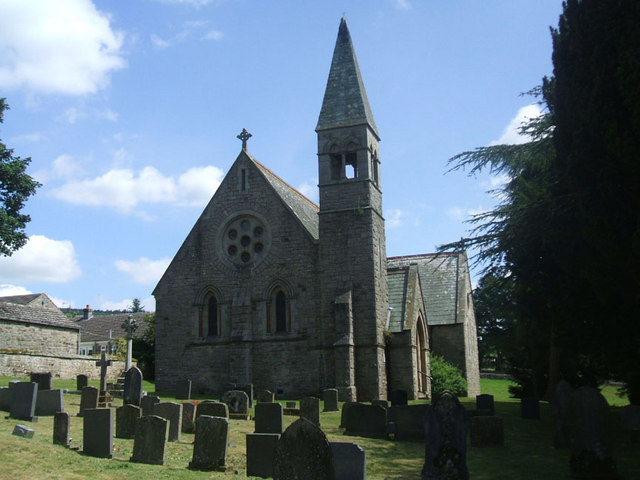
- Holy Trinity Church, Eggleston

- Location within County Durham
- Population: 448 (2011)
- OS grid reference: NY998236
- Unitary authority: County Durham
- Ceremonial county: County Durham
- Region: North East
- Country: England
- Sovereign state: United Kingdom
- Post town: Barnard Castle
- Postcode district: DL12
- Police: Durham
- Fire: County Durham and Darlington
- Ambulance: North East
- UK Parliament: Bishop Auckland

Eggleston is a village in County Durham, in England. The population of the civil parish taken at the 2011 Census was 448. It is in the Teesdale, a few miles north-west of Barnard Castle.

== Etymology ==
The second element of Eggleston is Old English tün, 'enclosure, estate, settlement'. The first element could be the Cumbric word *eglēs, represented today by Welsh eglwys 'church'. However, the first element could also be from the Old Norse personal name Egill or an Anglo-Saxon personal name like Ecgwulf or Ecgel, in which case the name means 'Ecgel's estate'.

Local lore notes the presence of a large stone (near Eggleston Hall) with iron eyelets affixed. The story is that eagles to be used in falconry, while in training, were tied to the stone with long leads. According to local knowledge the stone long ago was known as the Eagle Stone which over the centuries evolved into current place name Eggleston.

== History ==
The village is first mentioned in tax records of 1196. The remains of ridge and furrow from ploughing from the medieval period can still be seen. One of the oldest structures in the village is Eggleston Bridge, which crosses into the neighbouring village of Romaldkirk. The bridge dates to the 15th century but was mostly rebuilt in the 17th century. It originally featured a chapel at the south end. Many of the cottages date from the 18th century and were built by the Society of Friends, who owned lead mines in the area. Forty men were employed as miners until 1904 when the company closed the smelting mills.

Ripon Cathedral's marble font was made from Teesdale marble quarried at Eggleston and dates from the late 1400s.

== See also ==
- Egglestone Abbey
