= Upper Teesdale =

Site of Special Scientific Interest in County Durham, United Kingdom

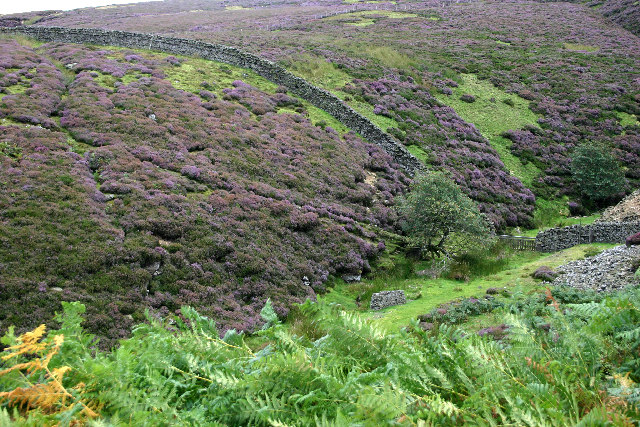
- Monk's Moor, Upper Teesdale SSSI

- Location within County Durham
- Location: MAGiC MaP
- Nearest town: Middleton-in-Teesdale
- Coordinates: 54°41′N 2°16′W
- Area: 14,035.6 ha (54.192 sq mi)
- Established: 1951
- Governing body: Natural England
- Website: Upper Teesdale SSSI

Upper Teesdale is a Site of Special Scientific Interest (SSSI) in the west County Durham, England. It encompasses an extensive upland area that includes the headwaters of the River Tees and the surrounding catchment area upstream of the village of Langdon Beck.

The site has a diverse mix of habitats, mainly dry heath, with wet heath and blanket mire in areas that are poorly drained.

The Upper Teesdale SSSI is one of the most important botanical sites in Britain; the flora is exceptionally rich in species that are nationally rare, including some that are relicts of the arctic-alpine environment of the last glacial period. The area supports internationally important populations of some wading birds and is home to several rare invertebrates. Within the SSSI are several locations that are of national importance geologically, including one of only two known outcrops of 'sugar' limestone in Britain.

The southern part of the SSSI largely coincides with the eastern portion of the Moor House-Upper Teesdale National Nature Reserve, which has been designated a 'Biosphere Reserve' by UNESCO. The entire area falls within the North Pennines Area of Outstanding Natural Beauty.

Much of Upper Teesdale SSSI was formerly designated as Upper Teesdale and Appleby Fells SSSI. Following a substantial revision in 1990, most of the site was divided between two new (but adjoining) SSSIs, Upper Teesdale in Durham and Appleby Fells in Cumbria. A small part was amalgamated with Moor House National Nature Reserve to form a third SSSI, Moorhouse and Cross Fell, which is contiguous with the other two. At the same time, two further SSSIs, Mill Beck Wood and Moking Hurth Cave, were incorporated into Upper Teesdale SSSI and ceased to exist as separate entities.

Part of the land within Upper Teesdale SSSI is owned by the Ministry of Defence as it includes part of the Warcop Training Area.
