= Newbiggin, Teesdale =

Village and civil parish in Teesdale, County Durham, England

Coordinates: 54.643°N 2.135°W

Newbiggin
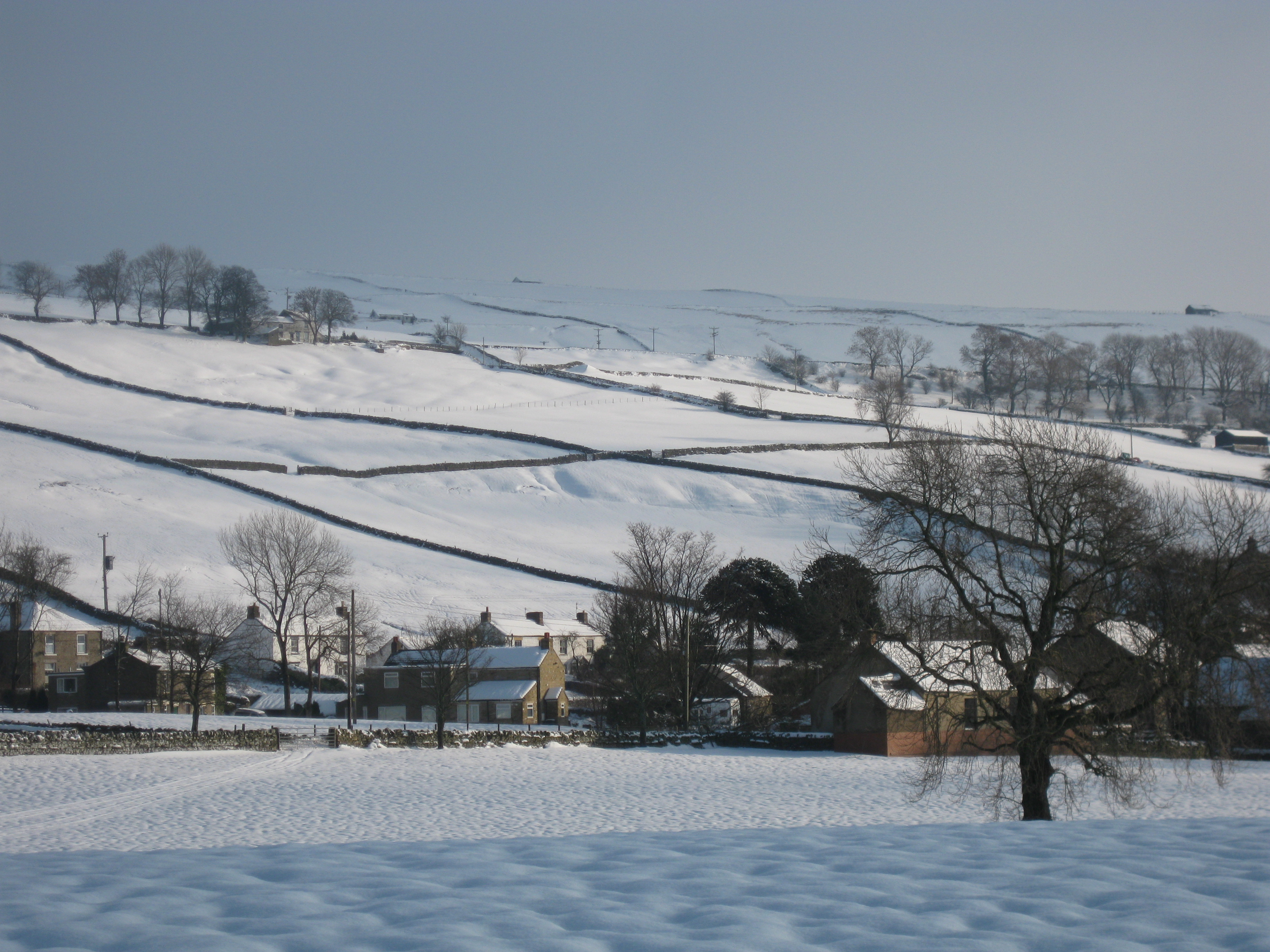
- Newbiggin in snow

- Location within County Durham
- Population: 146 (2011 census)
- Civil parish: Newbiggin
- Unitary authority: County Durham
- Ceremonial county: Durham
- Region: North East
- Country: England
- Sovereign state: United Kingdom

Newbiggin is a village and civil parish in County Durham, England. At the 2011 census the parish had a population of 146. It is situated on the north side of Teesdale, opposite Holwick. An influx of Derbyshire lead miners into the area in the late 18th century may have brought the name from Biggin. The village is within the North Pennines Area of Outstanding Natural Beauty (AONB).

The village of Newbiggin is up the River Tees from the incredible High Force, one of England's most impressive waterfalls. The hamlet of Bowlees is close by, as is the landfrom of Coldberry Gutter.

Newbiggin was formerly a township in the parish of Middleton-in-Teesdale, but in 1866 became a separate civil parish.

A Methodist chapel was built in the village in 1760. It is now a holiday let known as Newbiggin Chapel. For many years it was said to be one of the oldest Methodist chapel in continuous use. It is a Grade II listed building.

In February 2022 Robert Hooper, a local farmer, was cleared of dangerous driving and criminal damage, after using a telehandler with forks, to remove a parked car from a lane outside his farm, flipping it and pushing it on its side.
