= Coldberry Gutter =

Geological channel in County Durham, England

- Gorge
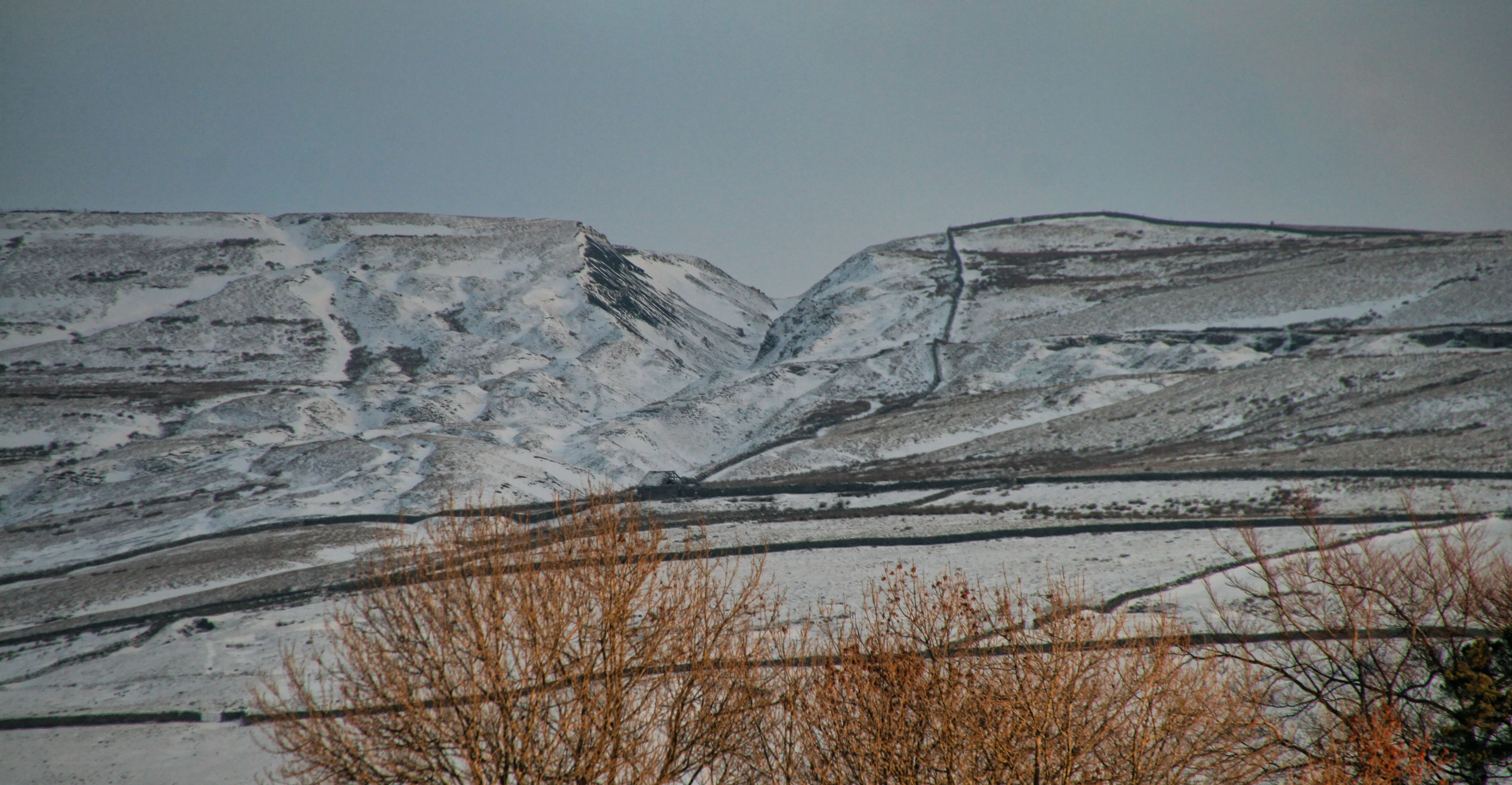
- Coldberry Gutter
- Interactive map of Coldberry Gutter
- Coordinates: 54.6558°N 2.1069°W
- Grid position: NY9428
- Location: Middleton-in-Teesdale, County Durham, England

Dimensions
  - Length: 1 kilometre (0.62 mi)
  - Width: 50 metres (160 ft)
  - Depth: 30 metres (98 ft)
- Elevation: 520 m (1,710 ft)

Coldberry Gutter (sometimes listed as Red Grooves Hush) is a narrow, incised west to east orientated gorge, on the watershed between and Newbiggin Beck and Hudeshope, near Middleton-in-Teesdale, County Durham, England. The site is believed to have been scoured out by hushing for lead and other minerals as it has two former lead mines at either end, (Note: Other minerals specifically worked for, or collected as a secondary mineral were; silver, witherite, barytes, amber and fluorite. However, lead (galena) was the main intended mineral to be quarried or mined in this area.) however, modern-day evidence points to the gutter being a glacial meltwater channel, which was utilised by the miners. The Coldberry Gutter is thought to be the largest and most dramatic hush in the North Pennines.

== History ==
Lead mining was carried on Hardberry Hill on the watershed between the Newbiggin and Hudeshope valleys from the 19th century until c. 1955, though some waste has been reclaimed for possible re-use after mining ceased. The gutter is considered to be the most dramatic of all of the hushes in the Northern Pennines, as its incised V-shape in the hill is visible from the top of Tees High Force. An estimated 825,000 cubic metres (29,100,000 cu ft) of rock was removed during mining activity. At the western end of the gutter is the former Red Grooves lead mine, which also lends its name to the gorge as Red Grooves Hush, and at the eastern end, is the former Coldberry lead mine, which was 5 kilometres (3 mi) north of Middleton-in-Teesdale.

Whilst it was formerly believed that the gutter was entirely created by mining activity, recent research indicates that the gorge is more likely to be a natural feature that was utilised by the miners, and thus made only marginally wider and deeper than it was originally. Geologists from Durham University have concluded that Coldberry Gutter is a glacial meltwater channel, carved by water escaping from the ice over 11,000 years ago. Many of the features of the gutter are not those associated with a traditional hush, leading to speculation that the gully is actually a meltwater channel. Another pointer to it being a natural feature is that the gutter is made up of mudstone and siltstones, which are not ore-bearing deposits in this area, and the lack of significant alluvial fans at either end of the gutter which would be present given the amount of water needed to be released to create the gorge in the first place. The gutter cuts through the Stainmore Formation and has "a bed of millerite-bearing clay ironstone nodules unique within the Northern Pennines and an abundance of unusual quartz-rich ironstone septarian nodules which are the source of the remarkable cellular quartz specimens found in many important collections of British Minerals." Coldberry Gutter has been described as a "conspicuous E-W orientated channel-like feature (gorge)", which is over 1-kilometre (0.62 mi) long, 30 metres (98 ft) deep and 50 metres (160 ft) wide.

The largest reservoir built for the hushing, Hardberry Hill Pool (also known as Coldberry Moss Reservoir), is at 523 metres (1,716 ft) above sea level, with an average depth of 4.7 metres (15 ft), a capacity of 50,927 cubic metres (1,798,500 cu ft), and covering an area of 8,580 square metres (92,400 sq ft). Leats were dug into the hillsides to bring water into the dams and reservoirs, with water from Hardberry Hill Pool being released westwards into the Red Grooves mining complex. The entire site including buildings, walls, dams, earthen banks and the gutter itself, were listed collectively as a scheduled monument in July 1997, and the site is also listed as a Durham County Geological/geomorphological site.
