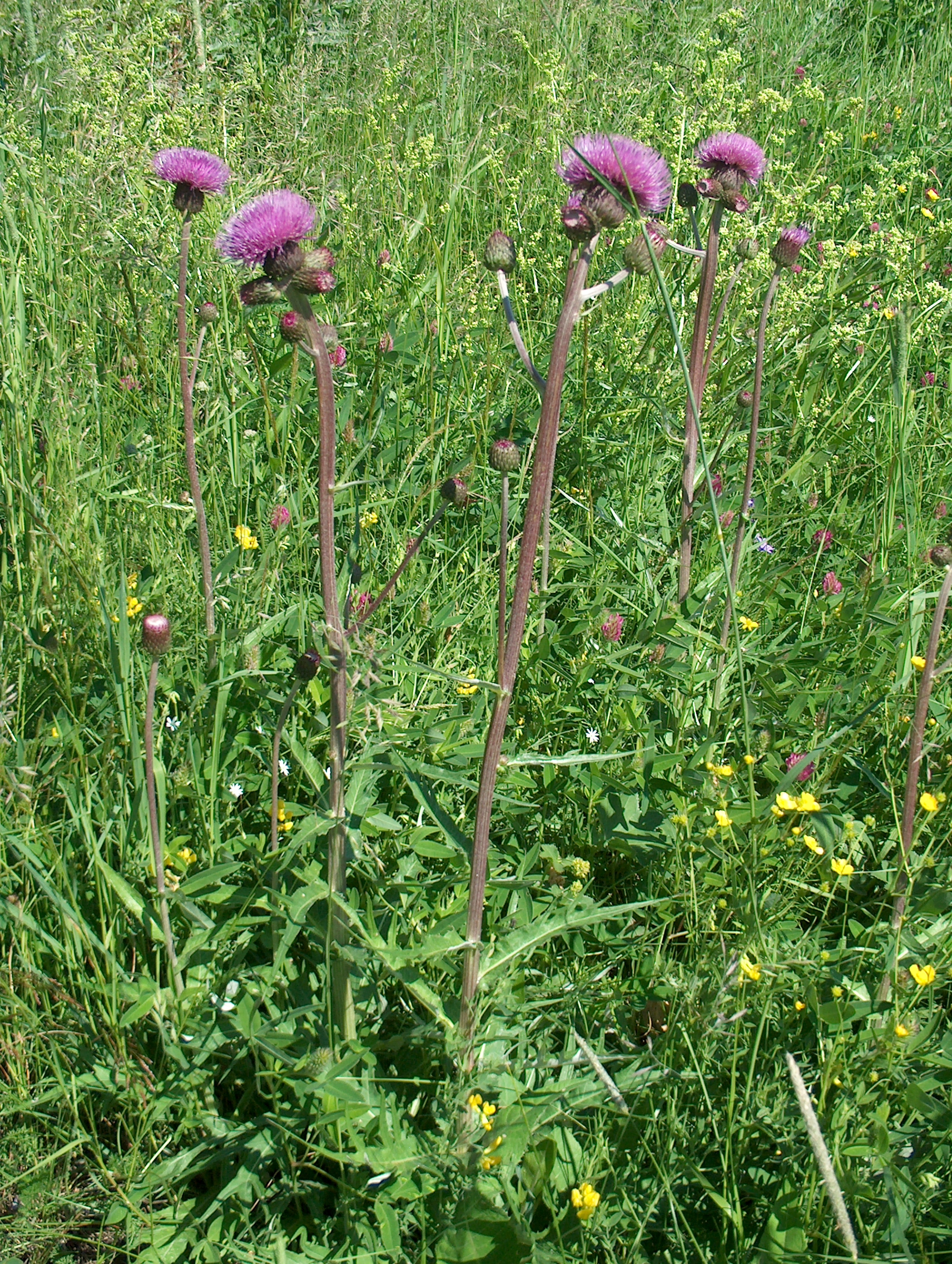
- In Finland

Scientific classification
- Kingdom: Plantae
- Clade: Embryophytes
- Clade: Tracheophytes
- Clade: Spermatophytes
- Clade: Angiosperms
- Clade: Eudicots
- Clade: Asterids
- Order: Asterales
- Family: Asteraceae
- Genus: Cirsium
- Species: C. helenioides

Binomial name
- Cirsium helenioides (L.) Hill

Synonyms
- Carduus helenioides L.; Cirsium heterophylloides Pavlov; Cirsium inuloides Rchb.; Cnicus helenioides (L.) Retz.; Cnicus helenioides (L.) Willd.

= Cirsium helenioides =

Species of thistle

Cirsium helenioides, the melancholy thistle, is an Asian and Arctic species of plants in the tribe Cardueae within the family Asteraceae. The species is native to Greenland (but considered extinct from Greenland since 1960), Iceland, Norway, Sweden, Finland, Russia, Xinjiang and Kazakhstan.

Cirsium helenioides is a perennial plant herb up to 120 cm (48 inches) tall, usually not branched, blooming only once before dying. Leaves are green on top, woolly underneath, with thin spines along the edges. There is one flower head per plant, with purple (occasionally white) disc florets but no ray florets.
