= Cow Green Reservoir =

Reservoir in County Durham, England

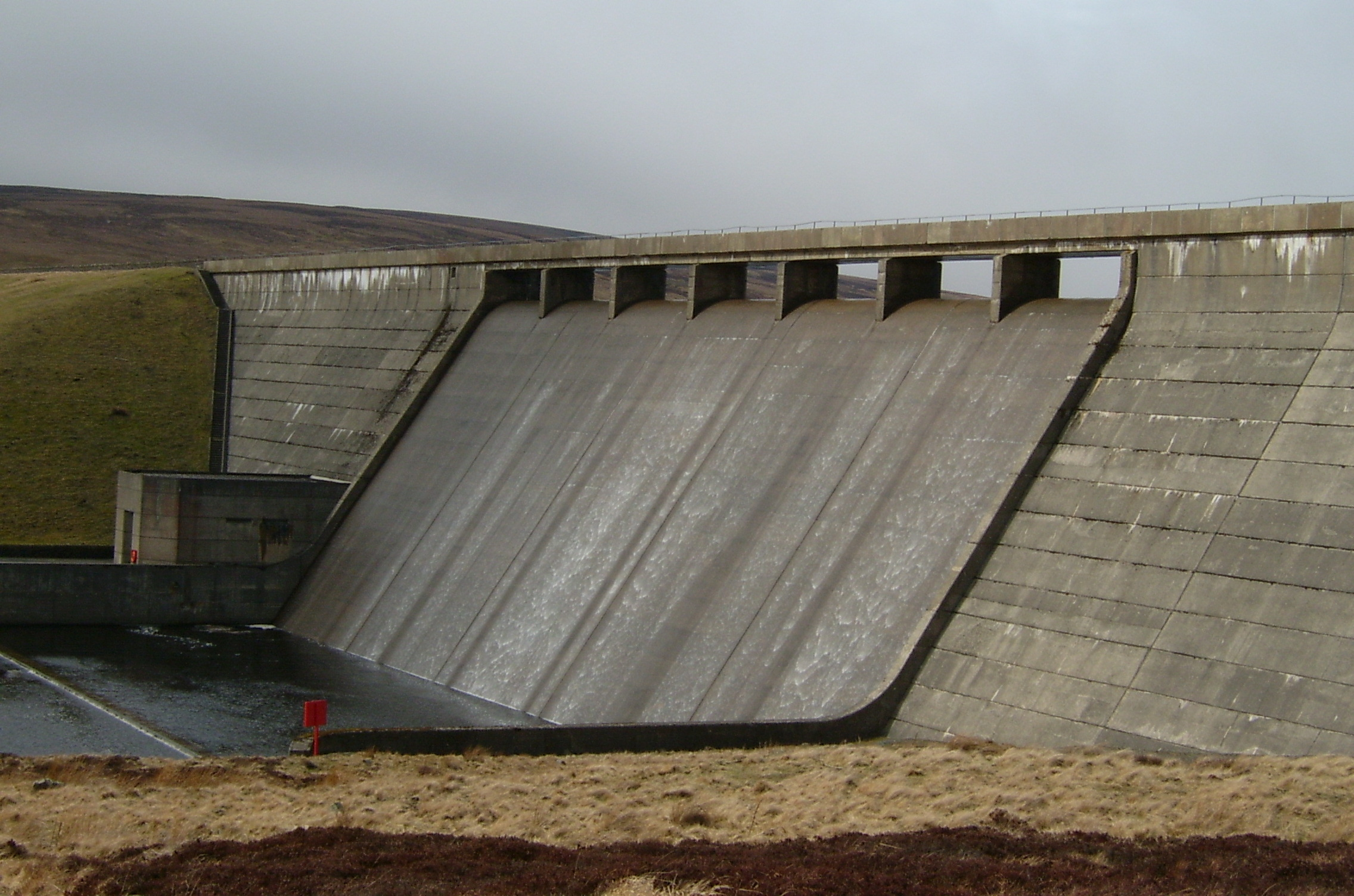
- The Dam at Cow Green

- Location within County Durham
- Location: County Durham/Cumbria (Westmorland) border
- Coordinates: 54°40′5″N 2°18′30″W
- Type: Reservoir
- Primary inflows: River Tees
- Catchment area: 59 km^{2} (23 sq mi)
- Basin countries: United Kingdom
- Built: 1967-1971
- Max. length: 3 km (1.9 mi)
- Surface area: 3.219 km^{2} (1.243 sq mi)

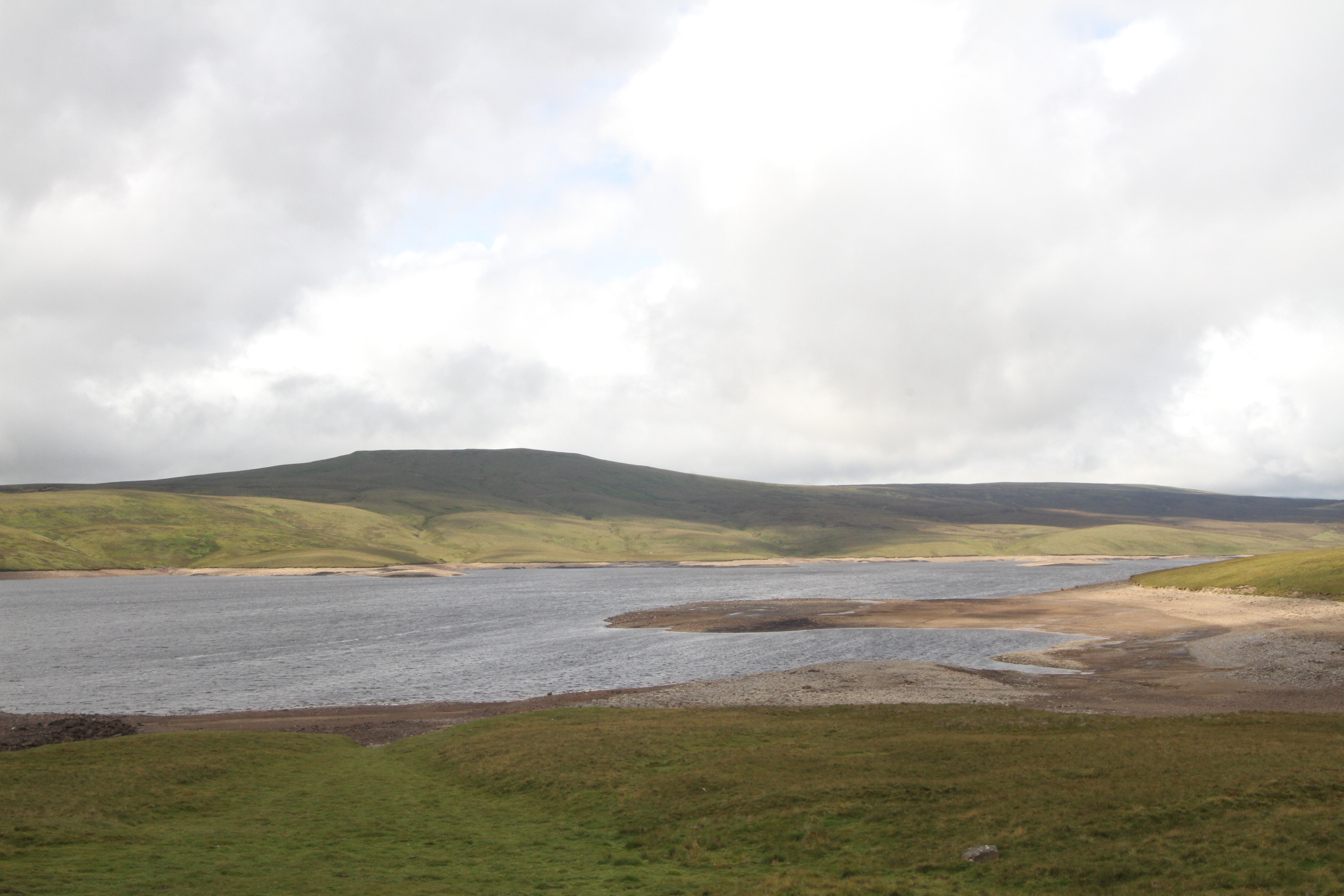
Cow Green Reservoir 02

Cow Green Reservoir is a 2-mile (3 km) long water reservoir on the River Tees bordering the historic counties of Westmorland and County Durham in northern England. The reservoir has a surface area of 3,219,000m^{2}.

Using powers granted under the Tees Valley and Cleveland Water Board Act 1967 the reservoir, needed to supply the industries of Teesside, was commissioned by the Tees Valley and Cleveland Water Board. The design engineer was Rofe Kennard & Lapworth, now part of Arup, and construction was contracted to Mitchell Construction. Works started in 1967 and were completed in 1970, with the reservoir being officially opened on the 22 July 1971. The reservoir is now owned and operated by Northumbrian Water and serves an area of 59km^{2}.

The reservoir acts as a river regulation reservoir releasing water into the River Tees during dry conditions so that it can be abstracted further downstream. These regulated flows allow six further reservoir levels to be maintained and these in turn provide water for industry and domestic use.

Environmentally, this part of Upper Teesdale is of national importance and the plan to construct this reservoir had been strongly opposed by local conservationists, professional botanists and geologists, including botanist Margaret E. Bradshaw. Their main concern was the protection of the rich flora and fauna of the district and especially rare alpine plants like the unique Teesdale violet. In the end, about a tenth of this plant's habitat was destroyed by the completion of the reservoir. The remaining area was designated the Moor House-Upper Teesdale National Nature Reserve in 1969, from what was previously two separate nature reserves and is England's largest reserve of this type.

The reservoir lies within the North Pennines Area of Outstanding Natural Beauty and European Geopark. The North Pennines was designated as an AONB in 1988 and became Britain's first European Geopark in 2004.

Cow Green Dam is 550m in length and 25m high and retains 40,000m litres of water. Due to different geology on each side of the River Tees the dam has two distinct construction methods. On the west side the dam is an earth embankment built on boulder clay whereas the east side is reinforced concrete, tied directly into the underlying Whin Sill. A short distance downstream from the dam is Cauldron Snout waterfall.

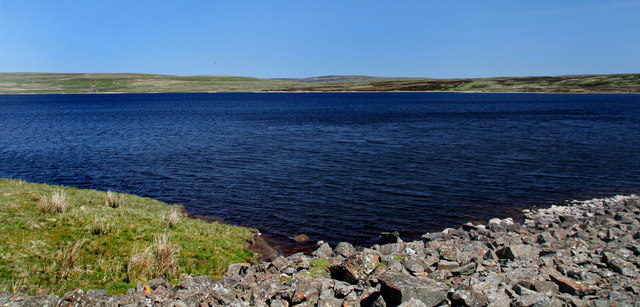
The reservoir's southern end, viewed from the dam

Cow Green Reservoir is also the largest reserve of wild brown trout in the North East. Fishing is permitted at the rate of twelve fish per day per person.
