= Moor House-Upper Teesdale =

UK national nature reserve

Coordinates: 54.637°N 2.302°W

Moor House-Upper Teesdale National Nature Reserve covers 7,400 ha of the Pennine moors in the north of England. It straddles Cumbria and County Durham. It was designated a UNESCO biosphere reserve in 1976.

The Moor House area was in the first group of national nature reserves (NNRs) created in England when it was designated in 1952. Upper Teesdale was a separate nature reserve until the end of the twentieth century. The combined reserve is England's highest and largest NNR. Great Dun Fell is the highest point. The Pennine Way passes through both “halves” of the reserve.

== See also ==
- Moorhouse and Cross Fell
