= Teesdale =

Valley in Northern England

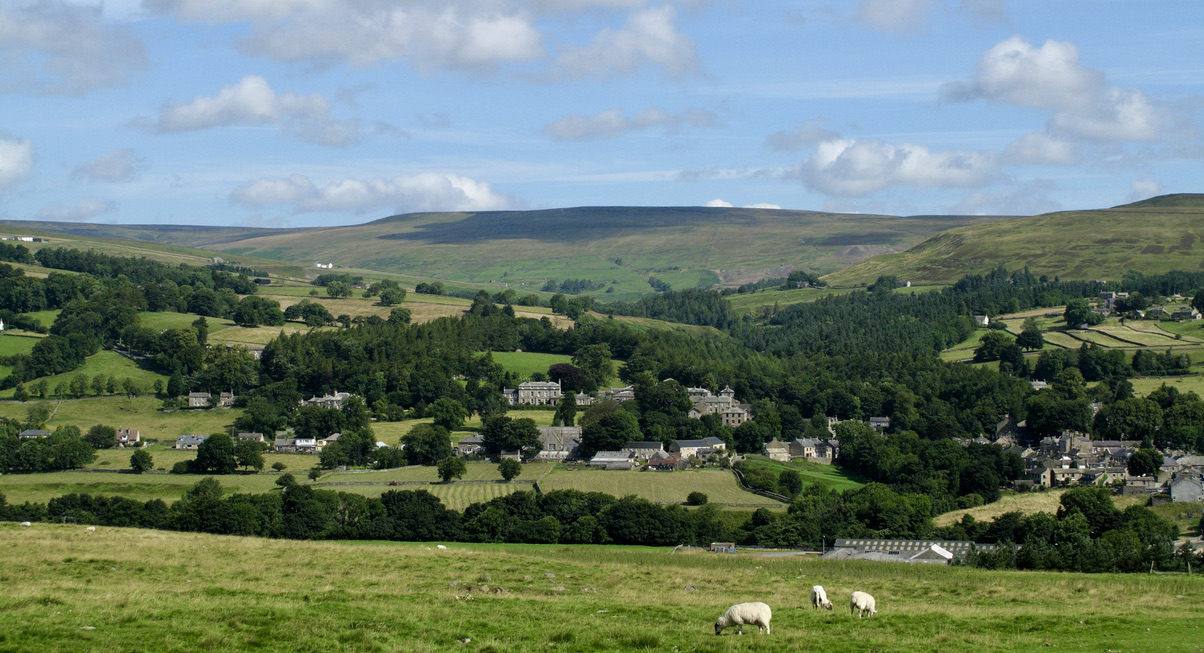
- View over Middleton in Teesdale

Geography
- Location: County Durham and Cumbria
- Country: England
- Population centers: Middleton in Teesdale, Barnard Castle
- Borders on: County Durham; North East England
- Coordinates: 54.545°N 1.927°W
- Traversed by: Teesdale Way, B6277 road
- River: Tees, Skerne & Leven
- Interactive map of Teesdale

Teesdale is a dale, or valley, located principally in County Durham, North East England. It is one of the Durham Dales, which are themselves part of the North Pennines, the northernmost part of the Pennine uplands.

The dale is named after its principal river, the Tees, which has its source below Cross Fell (890 m (2,930 ft)) in Cumbria. The upper dale is remote and high, but becomes gentler after it enters County Durham shortly downstream. The dale follows the river's south-easterly course to Barnard Castle, at which point the landscape begins to flatten into the Tees Lowlands. The Cumbrian part of Teesdale was historically divided between Cumberland and Westmorland, and the County Durham area between the former and Yorkshire.

Large parts of Teesdale are within the North Pennines national landscape, and Upper Teesdale has been designated a Site of Special Scientific Interest. Parts of the local climate have been scientifically classified as "Sub-Arctic", and snow has sometimes lain on Cross Fell into June.

== Geology ==
Unusually for the Pennines, rock of igneous origin (the Whin Sill) contributes to the surface geology and scenery of Upper Teesdale. Around 295 million years ago upwelling magma spread through fissures and between strata in the earlier Carboniferous Limestone country rock. As it cooled (an event which is believed to have lasted 50 years) the rock contracted and caused itself to split into vertical columns. The heating of the limestone above the rock also caused it to be turned into a crumbly marble known as Sugar Limestone.

Economic deposits in Llandovery rocks include soft shales that were previously worked to be used as slate pencils.

More recently, Ice Age glacial activity shaped the valley, and much of the pre-glacial river course is now buried beneath glacial drift. Glacial activity is also thought to have carved Coldberry Gutter to the north of Middleston-in-Teesdale.

== Botany ==
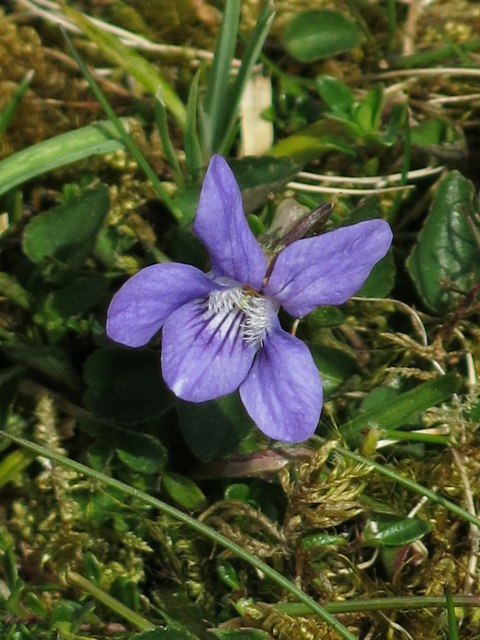
Teesdale violet

In places this impervious dolerite rock, with shallow soil above it, prevented the growth of scrub or trees: this enabled certain post-glacial Arctic / Alpine plants to survive here when elsewhere as a rule they were overgrown. The Sugar Limestone formed by thermal metamorphism of the limestone into which the Whin Sill was intruded also meets the requirements of some of these plants. Teesdale is famous among naturalists for the "Teesdale Assemblage" of plants found together here that occur widely separated in other locations, abroad or in the British Isles.

Part of Upper Teesdale near the Cow Green Reservoir is designated a National Nature Reserve; it contains the Teesdale Violet and the blue Spring Gentian as well as more common Pennine flowers such as rockrose, spring sandwort, mountain pansy, bird's-eye primrose and butterwort. Hay meadows in the valley above High Force contain a rich variety of flowering plants including globe flower, wood cranesbill and Early Purple Orchid. On the south bank of the Tees near High Force stands the largest surviving juniper wood in England.

== Geography ==
Over ledges in the Whin Sill fall the famous waterfalls of High Force and Low Force and the cataract of Cauldron Snout. From the source to the Skerne, Teesdale's principal town and most populous settlement is Barnard Castle, a historic market town. The area also includes the small town of Middleton-in-Teesdale and a number of villages, including Mickleton, Eggleston, Romaldkirk and Cotherstone. Middleton was a lead-mining centre, and plentiful traces of this industry can be seen round the adjoining slopes and side-valleys. On the south side of Teesdale is the Bronze Age burial site of Kirkcarrion. The other Durham Dales are on the northern side and to the south is the Yorkshire Dales, Swaledale with Richmond is the closest.

Places by the River Tees
North	South
Source then Middleton-in-Teesdale	N/a
Eggleston	Cotherstone
Barnard Castle	Startforth
Whorlton	Ovington
Winston and Gainford	N/a
Piercebridge
High Coniscliffe, Merrybent and Low Coniscliffe	Cleasby
Darlington	Stapleton
Hurworth and Neasham	Croft and Dalton
Middleton One Row	Over Dinsdale
Aislaby	Low Worsall
Egglescliffe	Yarm
Preston	Ingleby Barwick
Stockton (Bowesfield, town centre and Portrack)	Thornaby
Haverton Hill and Port Clarence	Middlesbrough (Old Middlesbrough and North Ormesby)
N/a	South Bank then the mouth

== Governance ==
The dale was formerly divided into four with the north in the Darlington and Stockton wards and the south was in the Gilling and Langbaurgh wapentakes.

Both dales gave their names to the former Teesdale district and Weardale district of western County Durham. The south is within the historic county boundaries of the North Riding of Yorkshire, Startforth Rural District, it was transferred to ceremonial County Durham on 1 April 1974, under the Local Government Act 1972. West Teesdale lies within the parliamentary constituency of Bishop Auckland (County Durham).

== Uses in local culture ==
- Teesdale (district), County Durham
- Teesdale Allotments, Site of Special Scientific Interest in the Teesdale district
- Teesdale Mercury, newspaper
- Middleton-in-Teesdale
- Forest-in-Teesdale
- Teesdale School, Barnard Castle
- Teesdale Way, path following the river Tees
- Teesdale Iron Works, former name of defunct Head Wrightson large heavy industrial firm based at Thornaby-on-Tees
  - Teesdale Business Park, on the site of the former works
  - Teesdale Park, Thornaby FC Ground

== See also ==
- Cleveland, England
- Cleveland Hills
- List of Sites of Special Scientific Interest in Cleveland
- Teesside
