= Middleton-in-Teesdale =

Town in County Durham, England

Coordinates: 54.6229°N 2.0779°W

- Town
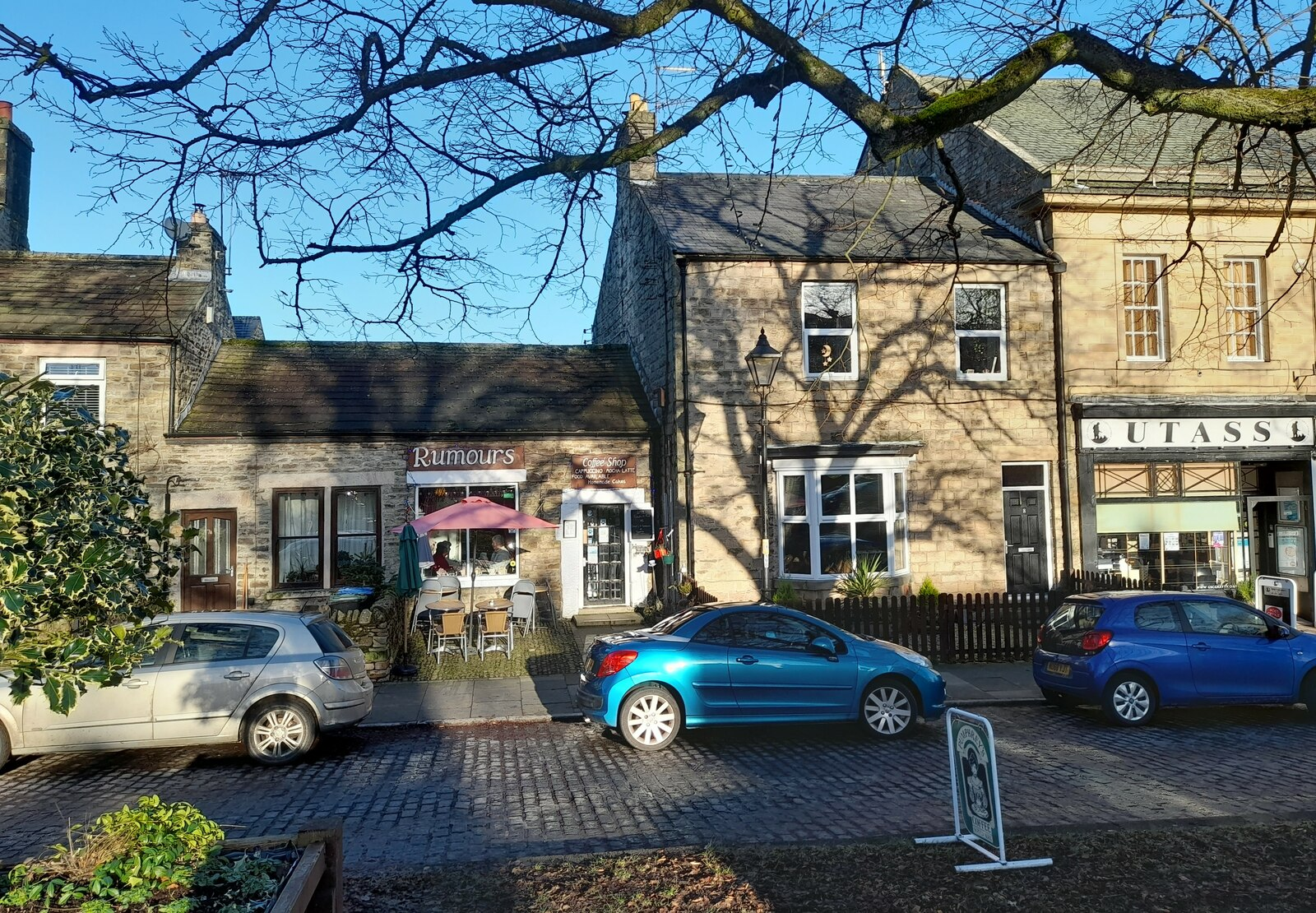
- Middleton-in-Teesdale town centre

- Location within County Durham
- Population: 1,137 (2011)
- Civil parish: Middleton in Teesdale
- Unitary authority: County Durham
- Ceremonial county: Durham
- Region: North East
- Country: England
- Sovereign state: United Kingdom
- Post town: BARNARD CASTLE
- Postcode district: DL12
- Police: Durham
- Fire: County Durham and Darlington
- Ambulance: North East
- UK Parliament: Bishop Auckland

Middleton-in-Teesdale is a market town and civil parish in County Durham, England. It is in Teesdale, on the River Tees's north banks, and surrounded by the North Pennines. The town is between Eggleston and Newbiggin, a few miles to the north-west of Barnard Castle. In 2011 it had a population of 1,137.

== Administration ==
Middleton-in-Teesdale is administered by Durham County Council. It is part of the Bishop Auckland parliamentary constituency in the House of Commons. Prior to Brexit in 2020, it was a part of the North East England constituency for the European Parliament. The local police force is Durham Constabulary.

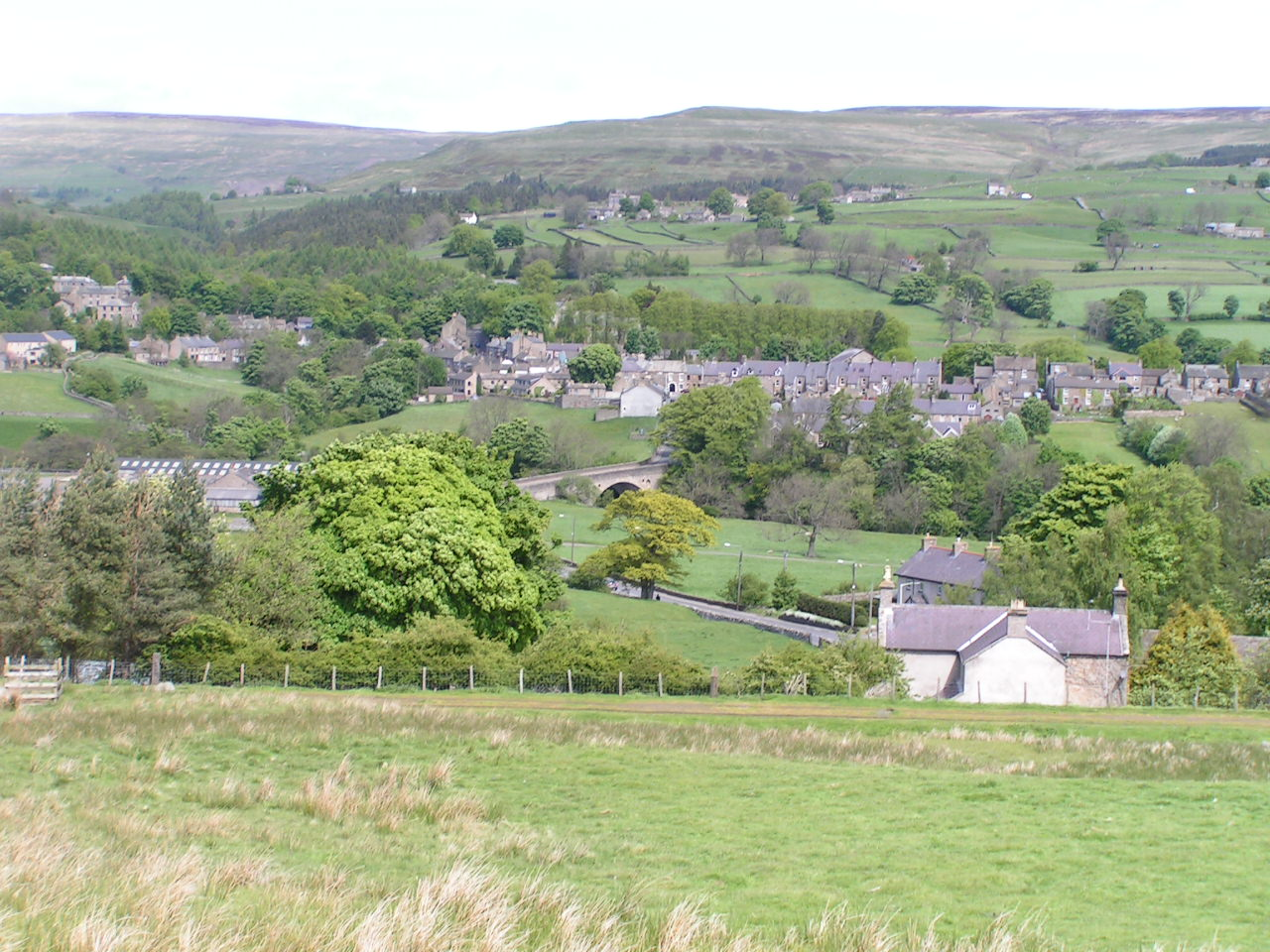
Middleton-in-Teesdale from the south

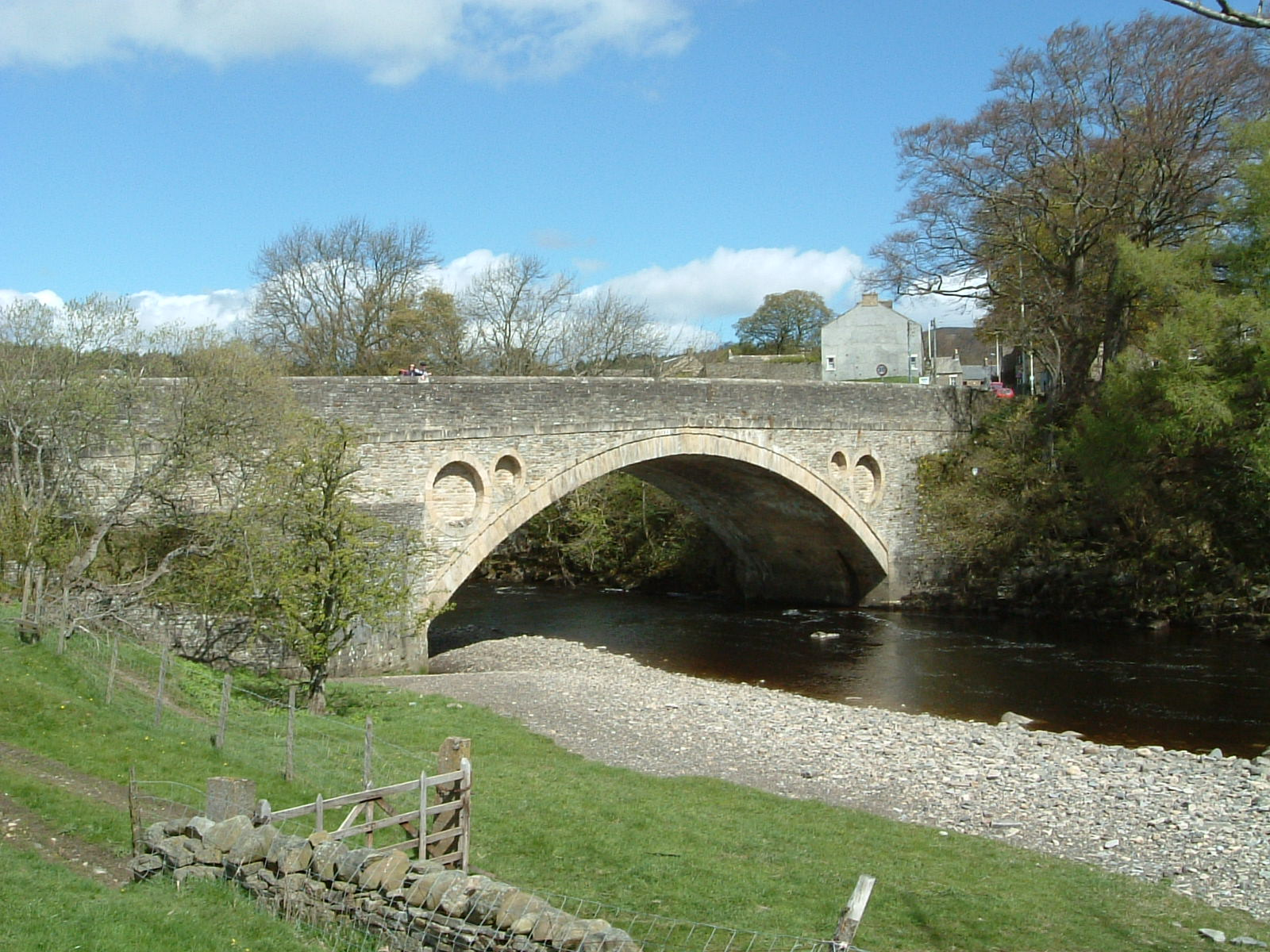
The bridge over the River Tees at Middleton-in-Teesdale

== History ==
The market town in Upper Teesdale expanded in the early 19th century when the London Lead Company moved its northern headquarters there from Blanchland in Northumberland. Much of the architecture from its days as a company town is still clearly visible. This includes Middleton House, formerly the headquarters of the company, the school (which is now an outdoor centre) and some company houses. Hushing for lead on the moors helped to carve out Coldberry Gutter, though the gorge is mostly the result of glacial meltwater activity.

St Mary's Church, rebuilt in the late 1870s, has a historic detached bell tower with bells dating back to the 16th century. There are separate chapels for Catholics, Baptists, Wesleyans and Primitive Methodists.

A fountain was erected in the town in 1877 to honour Robert Walton Bainbridge, superintendent of the London Lead Mining Company.

Middleton-in-Teesdale was the terminus of the Tees Valley Railway from Barnard Castle until this was closed as part of the Beeching Axe. The Wynch Bridge from 1830 close to the Low Force waterfall was built to allow miners to reach the Middleton mines. It is thought to be one of the oldest suspension bridge in England.

On 20 June 1939, a British American Air Services De Havilland Dragon Rapide (Registration:G-AERE) flying from Heston Aerodrome to Newcastle Airport crashed at Forest-in-Teesdale near Middleton-in-Teesdale. The weather was bad and the aircraft was flying low. The accident killed all three passengers and crew on board.
