= Conyers (disambiguation) =

Conyers is a city in Rockdale County, Georgia, U.S.

Conyers may also refer to:

- Conyers (surname)
- Conyers (given name)
- Baron Conyers, a peerage in the English peerage, created 1509
- Conyers baronets, an English baronetcy (1628–1810), including a list of baronets

== See also ==
- Conyer, a hamlet in Swale, Kent, England
- Conyers Dill & Pearman, an international law firm
- Conyers Farm, in Greenwich, Connecticut, U.S.
- Conyer's Green, Suffolk, a village in Suffolk, England
- Conyers' School, a secondary school in Yarm, England
- Hutton Conyers, a village in North Yorkshire, England
- Norton Conyers, a civil parish in North Yorkshire
- Yealand Conyers, a village in Lancashire, England
