= Sockburn Hall =

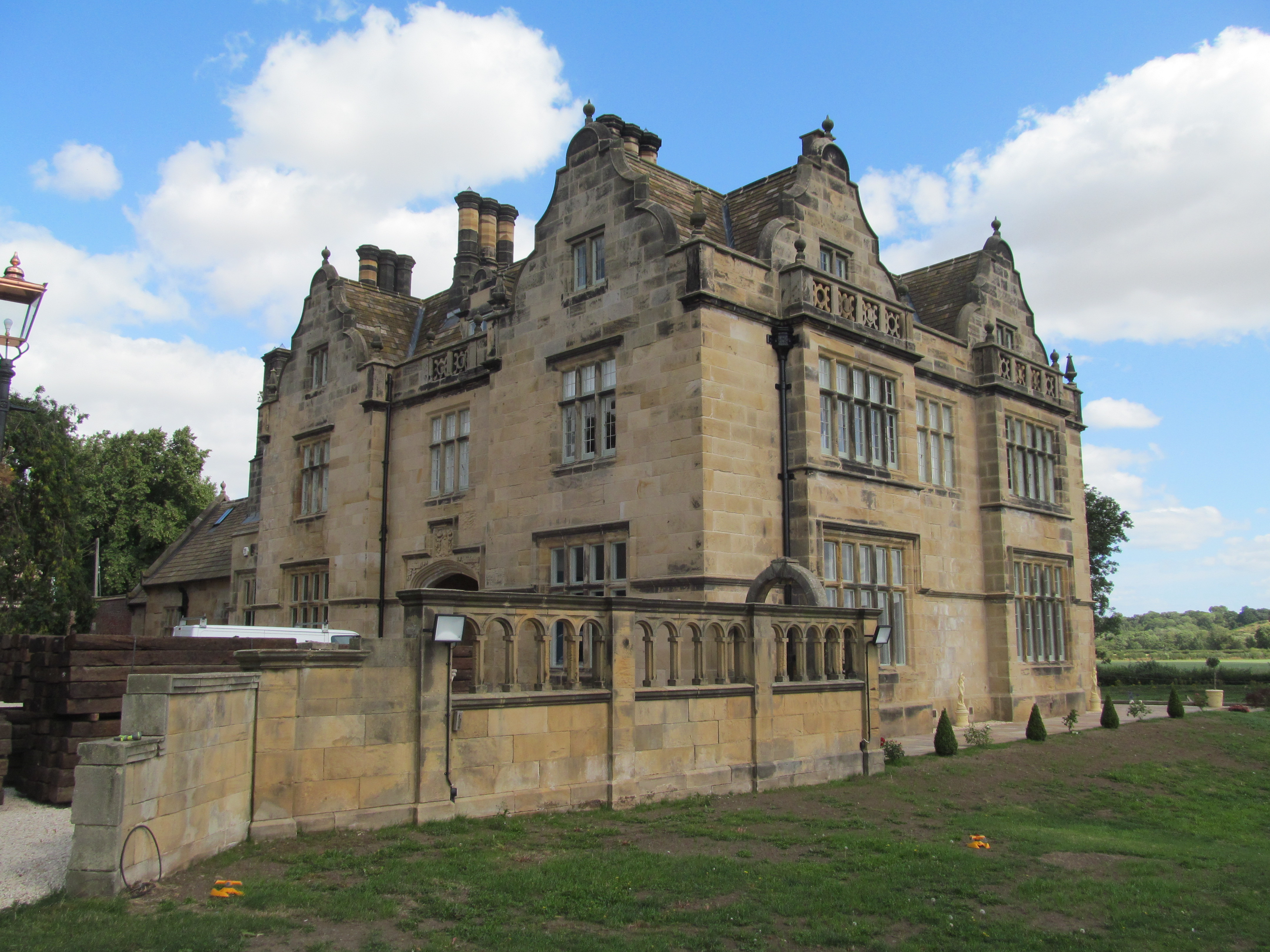

- Location in County Durham

General information
- Location: County Durham, England
- Coordinates: 54.459°N 1.464°W
- OS grid: NZ348072

Sockburn Hall is a privately owned 19th-century country house at Sockburn, near Darlington, County Durham, England. It is a Grade II* listed building. As at 2008, both the Hall and adjoining Grade II coach house were listed by English Heritage on the Buildings at Risk Register, as was the adjacent ruined Grade I Church of All Saints.

== History ==
The Manor of Sockburn was for many years in antiquity the home of the Conyers family, known, inter alia, for the legend of the Sockburn Worm. In the late 17th century the estate was purchased by the Blackett family.

The present house was built to replace the old manor for the occupation of Henry Collingwood Blackett (third son of Sir William Blackett, 5th Baronet) in about 1834 in a neo Jacobean architecture, with three bays, two storeys and attics above and shaped gables. Following the death of Blackett's widow in 1877 the house was let out. It deteriorated during the 20th century and in recent times the current owners have begun a restoration project.
