= Sockburn =

Village in County Durham, England

Coordinates: 54.46173°N 1.46397°W

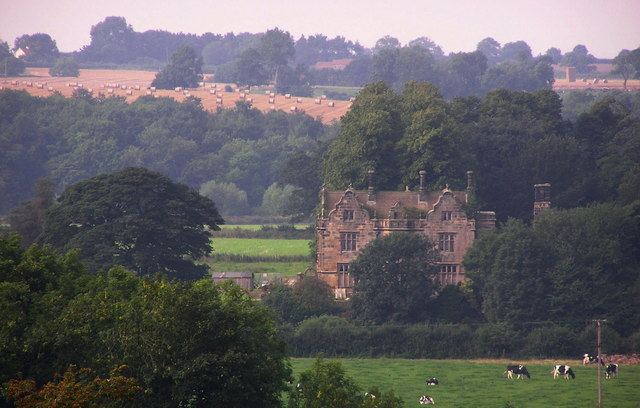
- Sockburn Hall (rebuilt 1834)

- Location within County Durham
- OS grid reference: NZ348075
- Civil parish: Neasham
- Unitary authority: Darlington
- Ceremonial county: Durham
- Region: North East
- Country: England
- Sovereign state: United Kingdom
- Post town: Darlington
- Postcode district: DL2
- Police: Durham
- Fire: County Durham and Darlington
- Ambulance: North East
- UK Parliament: Sedgefield

Sockburn is a village and former civil parish, now in the parish of Neasham, in the Darlington district, in the ceremonial county of Durham, England. It is situated at the apex of a meander of the River Tees, to the south of Darlington, known locally as the Sockburn Peninsula. Today, all that remains of the village is an early nineteenth-century mansion, a ruined church and a farmhouse built in the late eighteenth century.

Sockburn is known for its links with Lindisfarne and Celtic Christianity, the discovery of Viking Age hogbacks, the Sockburn Worm folklore, and Sockburn Hall, a 19th-century country house and a grade II listed building.

The name means "Socca's fortification".

== Governance ==
Sockburn was once a larger parish. The ancient parish included the townships of Sockburn in County Durham, and Girsby and Over Dinsdale, both on the opposite bank of the River Tees in the North Riding of Yorkshire. In 1866 Girsby and Over Dinsdale became separate civil parishes. By 1961 the parish had a population of only 32. On 1 April 2016 the parish was abolished and merged with Neasham.

== History ==
=== Celtic christianity ===
In antiquity, Higbald, Bishop of Lindisfarne was crowned at Sockburn in 780 or 781 and Eanbald, Archbishop of York, in 796.

=== Church ===
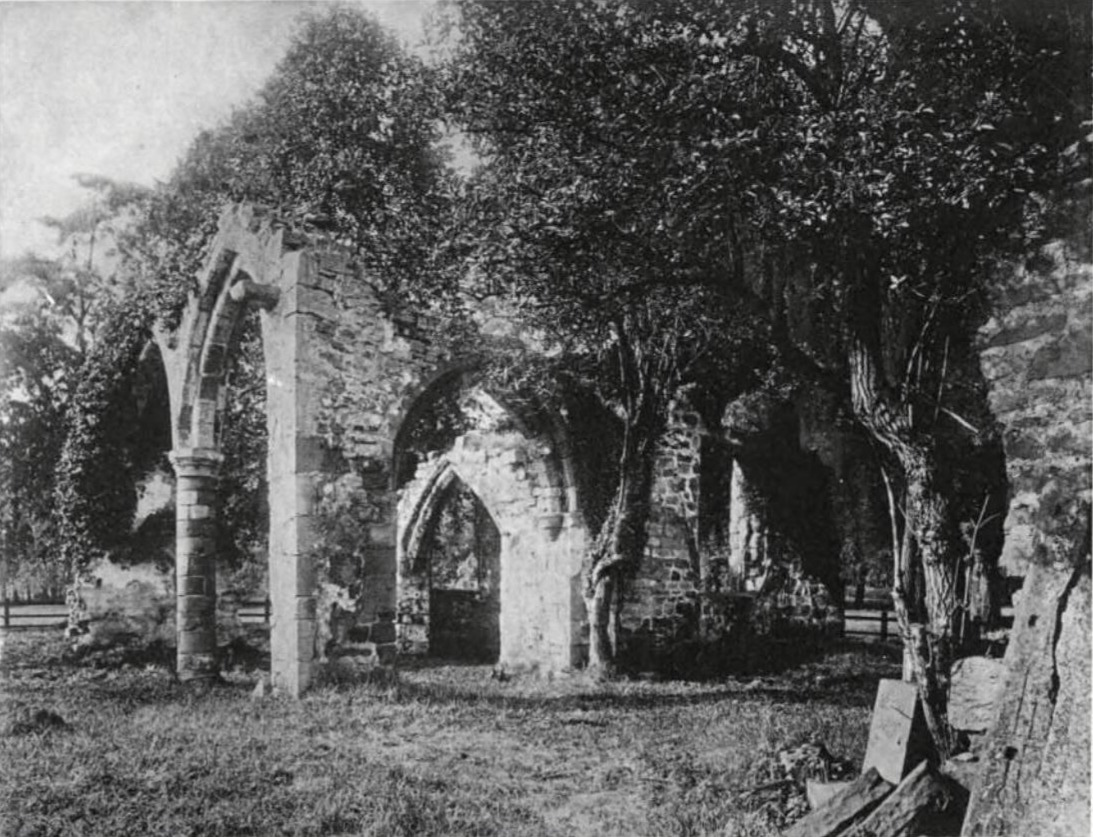
The remains of Sockburn Church (1894)

All Saints Church was in use until 1838, when it was replaced by All Saints' Church, Girsby, across the River Tees. It's now in ruins, but is protected as a grade I listed building.

=== Estate ===
For many centuries the estate was in the hands of the Conyers family. In medieval times Sir John Conyers was said to have slain a dragon or "worm" that was terrorising the district. The stone under which the Sockburn Worm was reputedly buried is (or at least until recently was) still visible, and the falchion with which it was said to have been slain is in Durham Cathedral Treasury. As Sockburn was the most southerly point in the Durham diocese, the sword was ceremonially presented by the lord of the manor to each new Bishop of Durham when he entered his diocese for the first time at the local ford or the nearby Croft-on-Tees bridge. This custom died out in the early nineteenth century, but was revived by David Edward Jenkins in 1984, the Mayor of Darlington doing the honours.

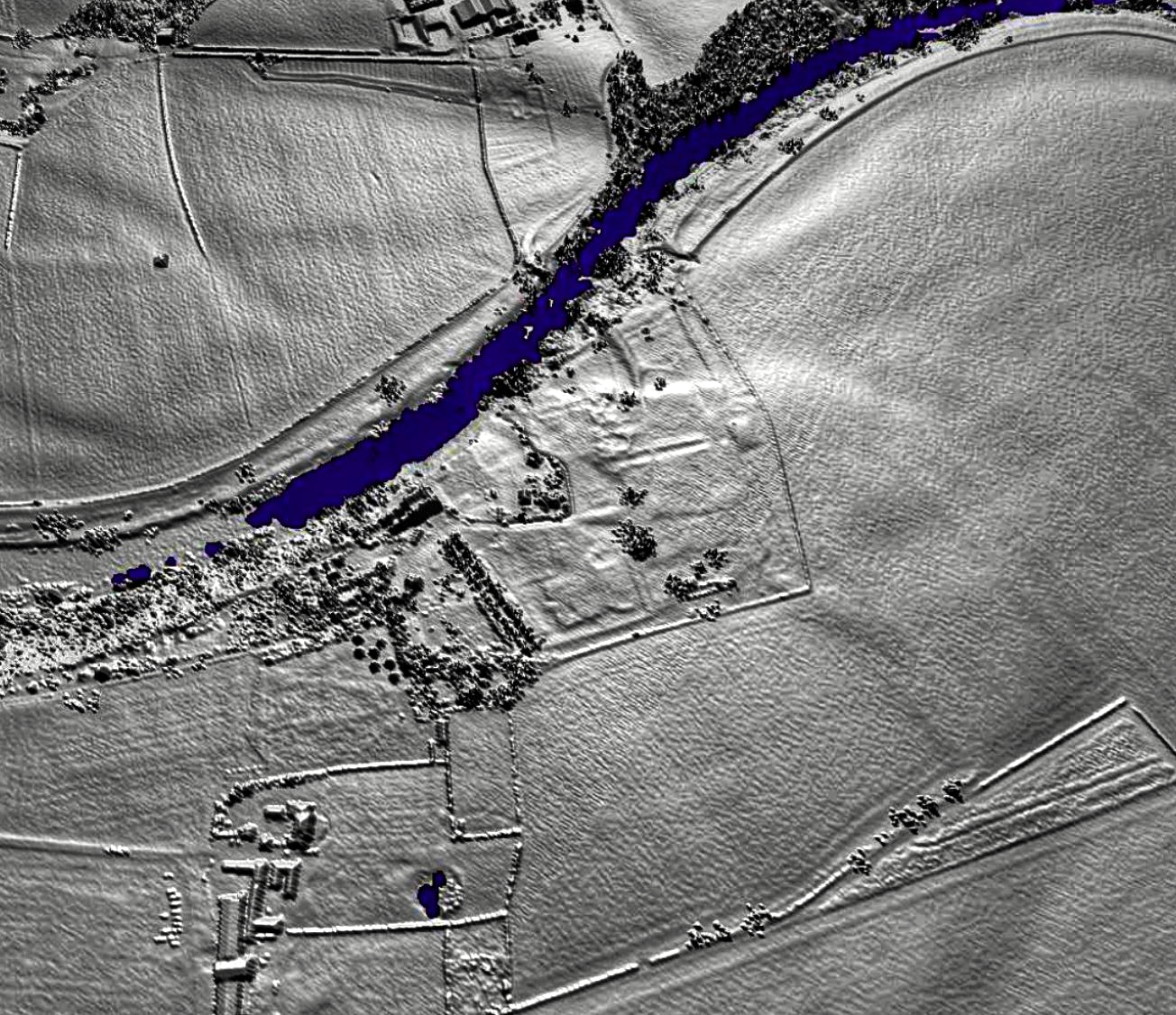
A lidar image of what remains of the village

The Conyers family died out in the seventeenth century, and their manor house fell into ruin. The estate came into the hands of the Blackett family, industrialists from Newcastle upon Tyne. A new mansion, Sockburn Hall, was built around 1834 for Henry Collingwood Blackett and the church was closed and allowed to become dilapidated, presumably because the occupant wanted a fashionable picturesque ruin in his grounds. A bridge to the south of the house was built in 1836–7, although all that remains today are the abutments. A new church for the locals was built at his expense across the river at Girsby. In about 1870, Henry's widow, Theophania, erected another footbridge some way north of the house, to enable the faithful to access their church without using a ford near the house.

The Conyers family of Sockburn continued in America when Edward Conyers, son of Christopher Conyers of Wakerly and Mary Halford, left England on Governor Winthrop's fleet ship Lyons and landed at Salem Harbor on 12 June 1630. Edward Conyers changed his name to Edward Converse. He founded the town of Woburn, Massachusetts, established the first ferry service between Charlestown and Boston, and as organizer of the First Church of Charlestown was called Deacon Edward Converse. His grandson, Samuel Converse, was among the first settlers of Killingly, Connecticut where his house, built in 1712, still stands today.

== Art and culture ==
A new farmhouse was built in the late eighteenth century. In 1799, this was occupied by Tom Hutchinson, who is said to have once bred a seventeen-and-a-half stone sheep, and his sisters Mary and Sara. They were distant relatives of the family of William Wordsworth. He lodged with them for six months in 1799, and eventually married Mary. His friend Samuel Taylor Coleridge also stayed there, and fell in love with Sara, but he was already married; his feeling for Sara found expression in his poem "Love", which contains references to the church and the dragon legend.

Another literary association is with Lewis Carroll, the author of Alice in Wonderland. His father was sometime rector at Croft-on-Tees, and it is very likely that the legend of the Sockburn Worm provided the inspiration for his poem Jabberwocky.

== Viking age hogbacks ==
Hogbacks are Viking Age sculptured stones that were designed to be used as grave covers. They were generally carved into curved shapes, and sometimes depicted scenes from Norse Mythology. One of the Hogbacks found at Sockburn may depict Týr and the mythological wolf Fenrir. The vast majority of Hogbacks found in England are in the North of England, and of those the most significant finds have been at Brompton, Northallerton (North Yorkshire) and at Sockburn.
