= Norton Conyers =

Civil parish in North Yorkshire, England

Coordinates: 54.1810°N 1.5114°W

Norton Conyers is a civil parish in North Yorkshire, England, 3 miles (5 km) north of Ripon. There is no modern village in the parish. Most of the parish is occupied by the grounds of Norton Conyers House, which cover the site of a deserted medieval village.

The population of the parish was estimated at 30 in 2015.

Norton was mentioned in the Domesday Book in 1086, when the soke belonged to the Bishop of Durham. Between 1099 and 1133 Norton was enfeoffed to the Conyers family, and thus acquired its full name. When the Conyers estates were divided in 1199, Norton went to the elder branch of the family, along with Hutton Conyers. By the late 14th century the manor passed to the Norton family, one of whose members built Norton Conyers House.

Norton Conyers was a chapelry of the parish of Wath in the North Riding of Yorkshire, although unlike the rest of the parish it formed part of the wapentake of Allertonshire. It became a separate civil parish in 1866. In 1974 it was transferred to the new county of North Yorkshire. From 1974 to 2023 it was part of the Borough of Harrogate, it is now administered by the unitary North Yorkshire Council.

== See also ==
- Listed buildings in Norton Conyers
