= Church of St Peter, Croft-on-Tees =

Coordinates: 54°28′59.3″N 1°33′20.3″W

- St Peter's Church
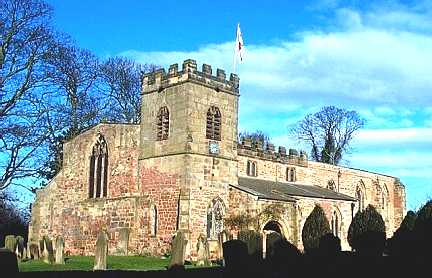
- Croft on Tees, St Peter's Church

- Location within North Yorkshire
- OS grid reference: NZ 28881 09846
- Location: Croft-on-Tees, North Yorkshire
- Country: England
- Denomination: Church of England
- Website: Official website

Architecture
- Style: Decorated

Administration
- Diocese: Leeds
- Archdeaconry: Richmond and Craven
- Deanery: Richmond
- Benefice: East Dere Street
- Parish: Croft

Clergy
- Vicar: Rev'd Gillian Lunn

Listed Building – Grade I
- Designated: 18 March 1968
- Reference no.: 1301945

The Church of St Peter, Croft-on-Tees is a 12th century grade I listed parish church in the village of Croft-on-Tees in North Yorkshire, England. Artefacts and carvings inside the church are believed to have given rise to many of the characters created by Lewis Carroll, who as a child, attended St Peter's in the 1840s when his father was rector of the church.

The church also features in Simon Jenkins' book "England's Thousand Best Churches".

== History ==
The church was first started in the 12th century and was added to in the 13th, 14th and 15th centuries with major renovations in the late 19th century. The bulk of the church is in the Decorated style with a later addition tower on the west side which is constructed of different stone to the rest of the church; the exteriors walls of the church are constructed from red sandstone which is found in the Tees Valley, though it has been re-inforced with brown sandstone. The nave and chancel together, measure 94 feet (29 m) from west to east. Whilst most of the architectural style of the building is described as Decorated, the clerestory, which was added in the 15th century, is noted for being in the Perpendicular style. Anglo-Saxon crosses are to be found in the chapel and the north door area. The site has been identified as being a location of Anglo-Saxon worship.

In 1680, the Milbanke family installed an elevated pew in the church (the Milbanke Pew) which is on the same level as the pulpit. It is reached via a "grand staircase" and is supported by Tuscan columns with fitted with red curtains. Glynne describes the whole section of the pew and stairs leading up to it as being "ugly".

The church was grade I listed in 1968 and includes the Todd Tomb in the churchyard, which commemorates John Todd of nearby Halnaby Hall, which is grade II listed.

Simon Jenkins in his book, England's Thousand Best Churches, awards the church three stars out of five and describes it as being

..A splendid church on the Yorkshire Durham border....[that] demonstrates what fun even the least sophisticated Decorated carvers could have with the standard furnishings of the liturgy.

== Lewis Carroll ==
Between 1843 and 1868, Lewis Carroll's father was the rector at the church in Croft. The family arrived in the village when Carroll was just 11-years' old, and he stayed until he was 19 before he left for Oxford. Many items inside the church have been cited as inspiration for a varying number of characters from Carroll's work; the grinning cat on the sedilla is believed to have inspired the Cheshire Cat and the sword which John Conyers is supposed to have killed the Sockburn Worm with used to be in the church and is presented on the occasion of a new incumbent of the Bishop of Durham.

In 2018, the sedilla was renovated as part of an £160,000 extension of the church. At the same time, a carved stone Jabberwock, which was detailed as per an original drawing of the dragon in the 1871 version of "Alice Through the Looking-Glass", was added to the building. The renovation, which includes Heritage Lottery Funding (HLF), will have a new visitors section with material created by pupils from Richmond School.

Due to its connection with Lewis Carroll and Alice in Wonderland, the church attracts many visitors from overseas, notably Brazil, China and the United States.

== See also ==
- Grade I listed buildings in North Yorkshire (district)
- Listed buildings in Croft-on-Tees
