= Girsby =

Village and civil parish in North Yorkshire, England

Coordinates: 54°28′11″N 1°27′15″W

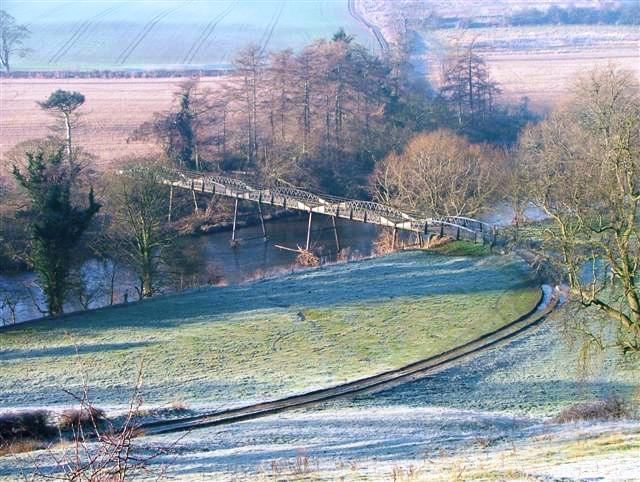
- Girsby Bridge, built 1870

- Location within North Yorkshire
- Population: 40 (NYCC 2015)
- OS grid reference: NZ355083
- Civil parish: Girsby
- Unitary authority: North Yorkshire
- Ceremonial county: North Yorkshire
- Region: Yorkshire and the Humber
- Country: England
- Sovereign state: United Kingdom
- Post town: DARLINGTON
- Postcode district: DL2
- Police: North Yorkshire
- Fire: North Yorkshire
- Ambulance: Yorkshire
- UK Parliament: Richmond and Northallerton

Girsby is a village and civil parish in the county of North Yorkshire, England. The village lies on high ground on the eastern bank of the River Tees. The population of the parish was estimated at 40 in 2015. The population as of the 2011 census remained less than 100. Details are included in the civil parish of Over Dinsdale.

== History ==
The village was mentioned in the Domesday Book as belonging to the then bishop of Durham (St Cuthbert), and having three ploughlands. The name of the village derives from Old Norse and is either a personal name (Gris's farm or village) or from Griss (a young pig), meaning a pig farm. Historically the village was a township in the ancient parish of Sockburn, a parish divided by the River Tees between the North Riding of Yorkshire (which included Girsby) and County Durham (which included the township of Sockburn). Girsby became a separate civil parish in 1866. The village is 160 feet (50 m) above sea level and sits within a loop of the River Tees, with the nearest side being just to the west of the village, with the land dropping away to 49 feet (15 m) above sea level.

The settlement has fallen into disrepair, many of the remaining buildings are derelict, there are barely enough houses to constitute a hamlet.

The small and secluded All Saints' Church, Girsby, overlooks the meandering Tees from its elevated position.

A private farmers track leads down to a rarely used bridge over the Tees. A public bridle path crosses the bridge linking Girsby with the nearby village of Neasham on the opposite bank of the river. A plaque on the bridge is inscribed;

Bridle Bridge,
Erected by Theophania Blackett 1870,
Thomas Dyke Esq Civil Engineer.

The church at Girsby was visited each Sunday by worshippers from across the River Tees, and in her later years (when she was widowed), Theophania Blackett objected to people traipsing past her house, and so she blocked off the paths to the ford. After many legal disagreements, Blackett agreed to fund the bridge.

The name bridle may refer to the historic right of way called bridleway.

== Governance ==
The village was in the wapentake of Allertonshire, the parish of Sockburn (which was actually in County Durham), and the Croft Rural District. It was in the North Riding of Yorkshire, but was moved into North Yorkshire when the boundaries changed in 1974. From 1974 to 2023 it was part of the Hambleton District, it is now administered by the unitary North Yorkshire Council.

It is represented at Parliament as part of the constituency of Richmond and Northallerton.

Population of Girsby 1801–2015
1801	1811	1821	1831	1841	1851	1861	1871	1881	1891	1901	1911	1921	1931	1951	1961	2011	2015
80	93	85	83	80	101	90	77	68	89	68	70	76	60	65	47	40 (Note: Estimated population.)	40 (Note: Estimated population.)

== See also ==
- Listed buildings in Girsby
