= Jolby Manor =

Historic building in Croft-on-Tees, North Yorkshire, England

Coordinates: 54°29′11″N 1°36′13″W

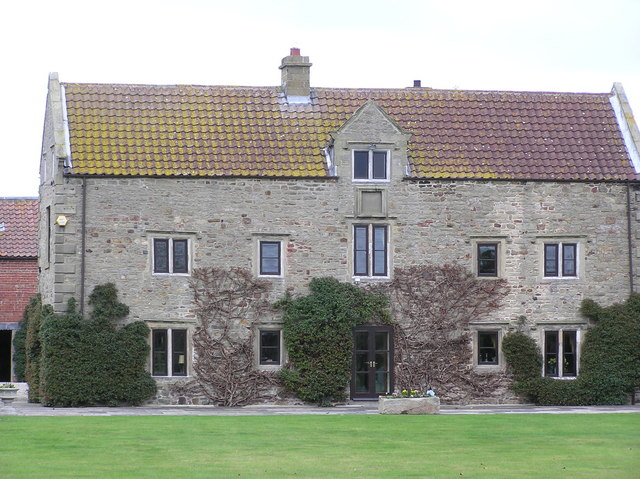
The building, in 2006

Jolby Manor is a historic building in Croft-on-Tees, a village in North Yorkshire, in England.

There has been a manor house at Jolby since the mediaeval period. The current building was constructed in the mid to late 17th century. A vestibule and reception hall were created in the 18th century. In the 20th century, a triangular extension was built in the angle of the rear right-hand range, and the roof was replaced. The house was grade II listed in 1968. In the 1980s, a secondary entrance was created, the kitchen was extended, and an orangery, master bedroom suite and roof terrace were added. In 2023, it was put up for sale for £1.95 million.

The building is constructed of sandstone, with chamfered rusticated quoins and a tile roof. There are two storeys and attics, and an L-shaped plan, with a main range of five bays and a rear wing. The doorway is in the centre, and the windows either have a single light or chamfered mullions and hood moulds. In the centre is a dormer in a stone coped gable with shaped kneelers, and below it is a moulded panel. In the angle at the rear is a re-set doorway with a moulded surround, a stepped base, a cornice on consoles and pedimented moulding.

== See also ==
- Listed buildings in Croft-on-Tees
