= Listed buildings in Over Dinsdale =

Over Dinsdale is a civil parish in the county of North Yorkshire, England. It contains three listed buildings that are recorded in the National Heritage List for England. All the listed buildings are designated at Grade II, the lowest of the three grades, which is applied to "buildings of national importance and special interest". The parish contains the village of Over Dinsdale and the surrounding countryside, and the listed buildings consist of a weir and fish lock, and two farmhouses.

== Buildings ==
Name and location	Photograph	Date	Notes
Low Moor Farmhouse; 54.48964°N 1.44196°W		18th century	The farmhouse is in red brick and stone, with dentilled eaves, and a pantile roof with stone coping. There are two storeys and a double depth plan, with a front range of two bays, and the rear range has four bays. The doorway has a moulded architrave, and a blind fanlight in a round brick arch. On the front is one casement window, and the other windows are sashes.
Rose Hill Farmhouse; 54.48960°N 1.44874°W	—	Mid-18th century	The farmhouse is in red brick, with dentilled eaves, and a tile roof with brick gable copings. There are two storeys and four bays. The doorway has reeded pilasters, a fanlight a frieze, a cornice and side lights. On both floors are sash windows and blocked openings. At the rear is a round-arched stair window.
Weir and fish lock 54.48240°N 1.45815°W		Mid-18th century	The weir curving across the River Tees is in sandstone blocks, and extends for about 50 metres (160 ft). The fish lock on the east side has a square plan with round archways on the upstream and downstream faces.
