= Norton Conyers House =

Country house in North Yorkshire, England

Coordinates: 54.1810°N 1.5114°W

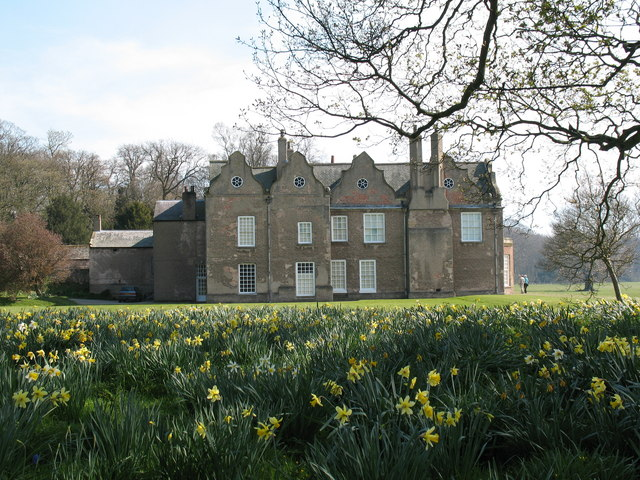
Norton Conyers House

Norton Conyers House is a grade II* listed late medieval manor house with Stuart and Georgian additions, in North Yorkshire, England, some 4 miles (7 km) north of Ripon.

The frontage has distinctive Dutch-style gables and is thought to be the inspiration for Charlotte Brontë's novel Jane Eyre. Brontë visited Norton Conyers in 1839 as governess to the then-tenants' grandchildren. The house has a family legend of a madwoman confined in the attics.

It has an 18th-century garden surrounding an Orangery. It is built in two storeys with a four-bay frontage to a square floor plan of brick with a Westmorland slate roof. The nearby stable block is also grade II listed.

== History ==
The manor of Norton Conyers once belonged to Richard Norton, but was confiscated when he was attainted after the failure of the Rising of the North in 1569. After briefly belonging to the Musgraves it was acquired by Sir Richard Graham (c. 1583–1654) in 1624 and, except for 20 years between 1862 and 1882, has remained in the Graham family ever since.

Sir Richard Graham was a Royalist from Cumberland who was wounded in 1644 at the Battle of Marston Moor. The Graham Baronetcy, of Norton Conyers in the County of York, was created in the Baronetage of England on 17 November 1662 for Richard Graham (1636–1711), the second son of Sir Richard Graham (c. 1583–1654), in honour of his services to the Restoration of the Monarchy.

== Architecture ==
=== House ===
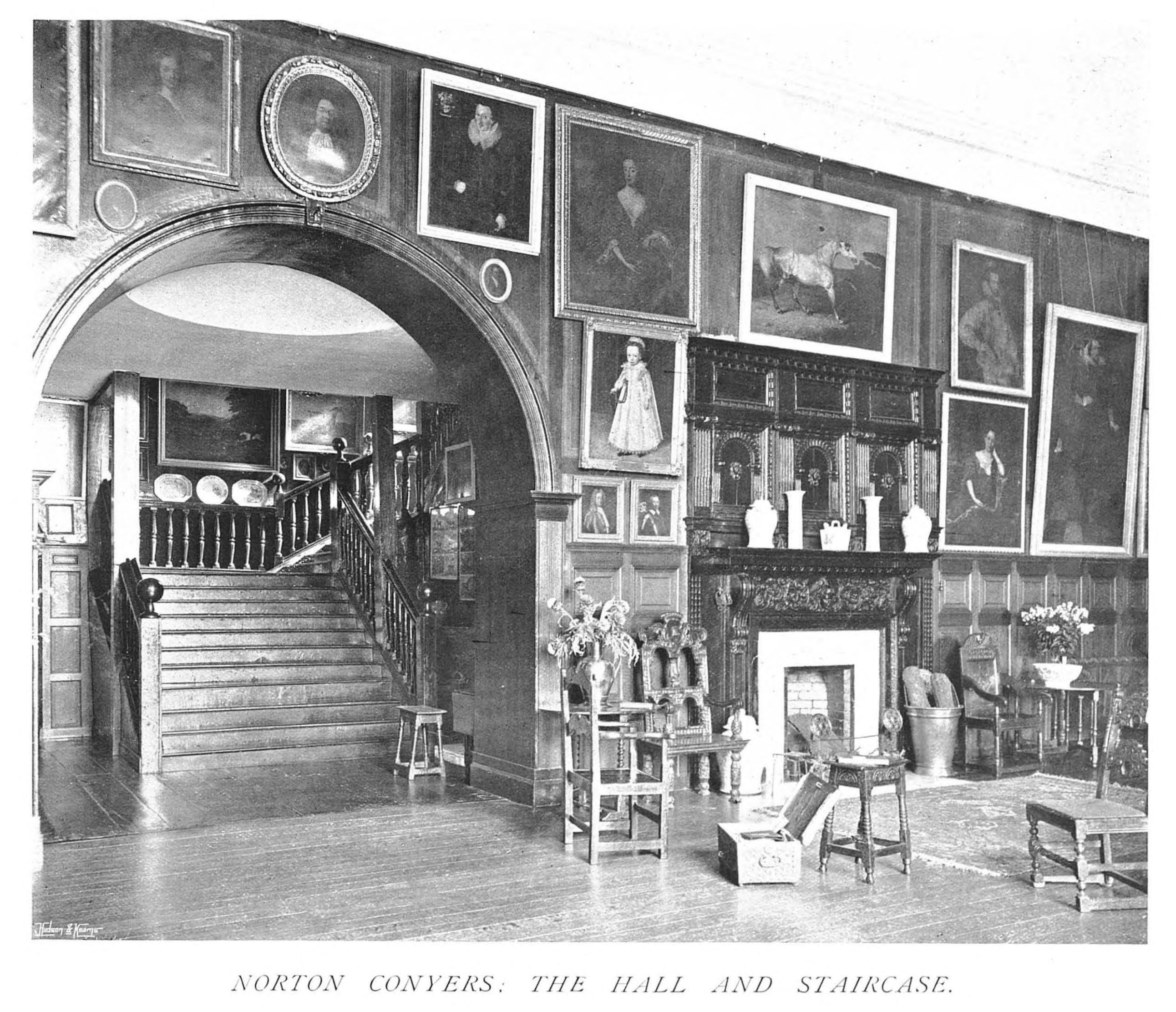
The hall and staircase, in 1904

The house is built of roughcast brick, with a moulded eaves cornice and a Westmorland slate roof. It has two storeys, and two ranges at right angles with four bays each. The southwest front has four ogee-curved gables, each containing a small oeil-de-boeuf window, and kneelers with ball finials. In the centre are double doors with pulvinated rusticated piers, a pair of Corinthian columns, an entablature, a frieze with swags, a dentilled cornice, and a broken triangular pediment with a heraldic shield. To the left is a mullioned and transomed hall window, the outer bays contain canted bay windows, and elsewhere are sash windows.

Inside the house, the hall has a cornice decorated with acorns and a 17th-century fireplace. The parlour has an 18th-century fireplace, plasterwork, shutters and panelling. The library also has an 18th-century fireplace, while the dining room has 18th-century plasterwork and shutters. The main staircase is 16th century but much restored.

=== Stables ===
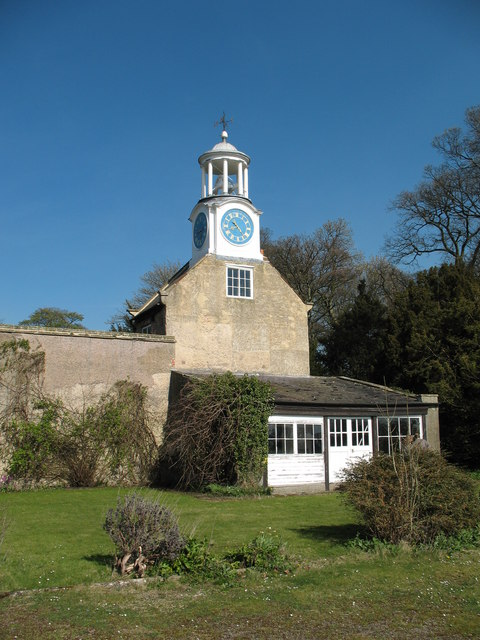
The old stables

The old stables are grade II-listed and were built in the 17th century. They are built of roughcast brick with a roof of Westmorland slate and stone slate. They have two storeys and eleven bays, and it contains a band and sash windows, some horizontally-sliding. On the right is a two-storey bay and a wall, and a two-storey bay linking the clock tower to the house. The clock tower consists of a wooden cupola with a square base, a clock face, a circular clock tower with columns, and a domed roof with a finial. The wall is coped, and carries leads urns decorated with masks and pineapple finials.

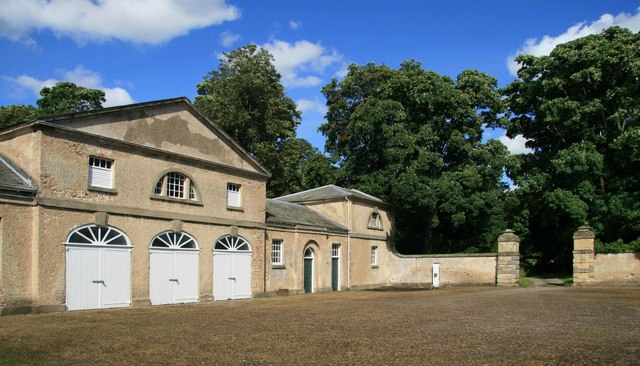
The new stables

The newer stable block was built in the late 18th century and is grade II* listed. It is built of rendered stone and brick, and has a Westmorland slate roof. It consists of a rectangular courtyard with ranges on three sides and a wall with a gateway on the east side. The north range has a central block with two storeys and three bays, flanked by single-storey two-bay wings, linked to two-storey two-bay end blocks. The central block has a floor band and a sill band, a moulded eaves course and a pediment. On the ground floor are round-arched doorways with fanlights, above the middle doorway is a Diocletian window with a keystone, and the outer bays contain square windows. The east wall has stone coping, and the gateway has piers with channelled quoins, and moulded capitals on plinths.

=== Wath Lodge ===
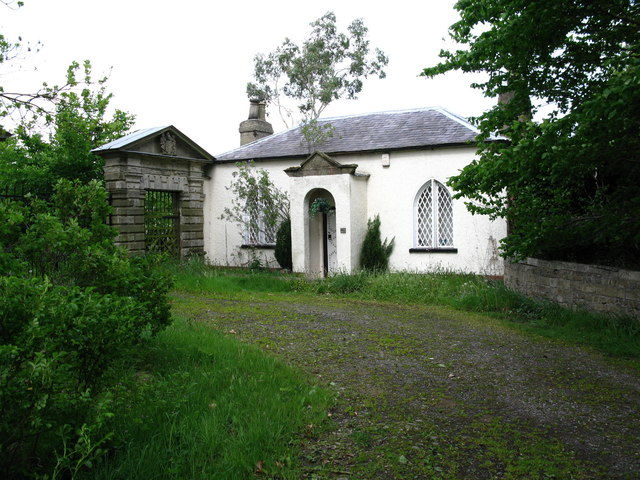
Wath Lodge

The grade II-listed lodge was built in the late 18th century. It is constructed of roughcast sandstone and has a Westmorland slate roof. There is a single storey and three bays. In the centre is a porch with a round-arched entrance and a triangular-pedimented head with kneelers, coping, and a wings motif in the tympanum. The outer bays contain windows with pointed-arched heads and a central mullion, and in the left return are two small square windows with hood moulds.

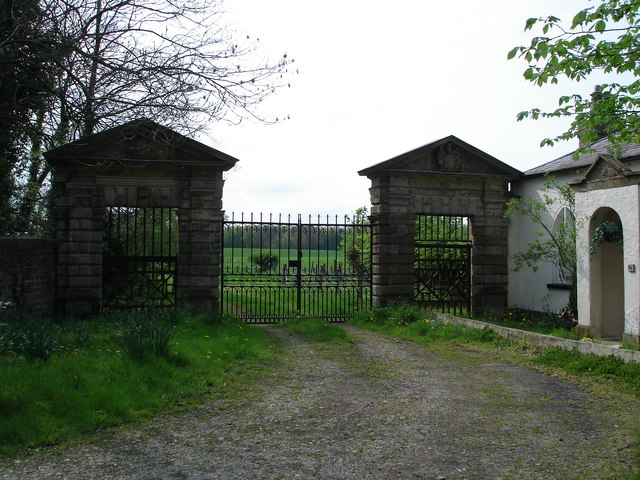
The gateway at Wath Lodge

The gateway at the lodge dates from the early to mid 18th century and is grade II* listed. The carriage gates are in wrought iron, and are flanked by pedestrian gates in piers in rusticated stone. Each pier contains a flat arch, and has pilasters with an egg and dart motif, and an entablature. Above is a triangular pediment with deep eaves containing a motto. The pedestrian gates are in wood, the lower parts in Chinese style.

== See also ==
- Grade II* listed buildings in North Yorkshire (district)
- Listed buildings in Norton Conyers
