= Listed buildings in Girsby =

Girsby is a civil parish in the county of North Yorkshire, England. It contains four listed buildings that are recorded in the National Heritage List for England. All the listed buildings are designated at Grade II, the lowest of the three grades, which is applied to "buildings of national importance and special interest". The parish contains the village of Girsby and the surrounding countryside, and the listed buildings consist of three farmhouses and a church.

== Buildings ==
Name and location	Photograph	Date	Notes
East Sockburn Farmhouse; 54.45825°N 1.45576°W	—	Late 17th to early 18th century	A farmhouse and a cottage, later combined, in red and grey sandstone with some brick patching, quoins, and a pantile roof with raised verges. There are two storeys, the main house has two bays, the former cottage to the left is lower with two bays, and at the rear are outshuts. The doorway is in the cottage, and the windows are casements.
Girsby Green Farmhouse; 54.46515°N 1.44813°W		Late 18th century	The farmhouse is in red brick, and has a pantile roof with shaped kneelers and stone coping. There are two storeys, three bays, and a recessed single-bay wing on the right. The doorway is in the centre, the windows in the main range are sashes, and in the wing they are casements.
Girsby Hall Farmhouse; 54.47340°N 1.45258°W	—	Late 18th century	The farmhouse is in red brick, with an eaves band, and a machine tile roof with shaped kneelers and stone coping. There are two storeys, a main block of three bays, and flanking recessed one-bay wings. The central doorway has a fanlight, the windows in the main block are sashes, and all the openings have flat brick arches. The openings in the wings are blank part from a casement window in the left wing. At the rear is a cobblestone block, and an arched stair window.
All Saints' Church; 54.46908°N 1.45546°W		1838	The church is in sandstone with a concrete tile roof. It consists of a nave and a chancel in one unit, and a south porch. On the west gable is a gabled bellcote with two round-arched openings. The porch is gabled, and contains a round-arched entrance with a chamfered surround, and the windows in the church have round-arched heads.
