= Chaytor baronets =

The Chaytor family is an English landed gentry family on which has been conferred two baronetcies, one in the Baronetage of England and one in the Baronetage of the United Kingdom and several knighthoods. As of 2026 one baronetcy is extinct.

- Chaytor baronets of Croft Hall (1671). They were the inheritors of the Anglo-Norman family of Clervaux that had arrived in England with Sir Hamon de Clervaulx [sic] in 1066 and had moved to the manor of Croft-on-Tees and developed Croft Hall.
- Chaytor baronets of Witton Castle and Croft (1831). They named Clervaux Castle, Yorkshire, which they built in 1842 but which was demolished in 1951, after their Clervaux ancestors.
