= Sir Christopher Conyers, 2nd Baronet =

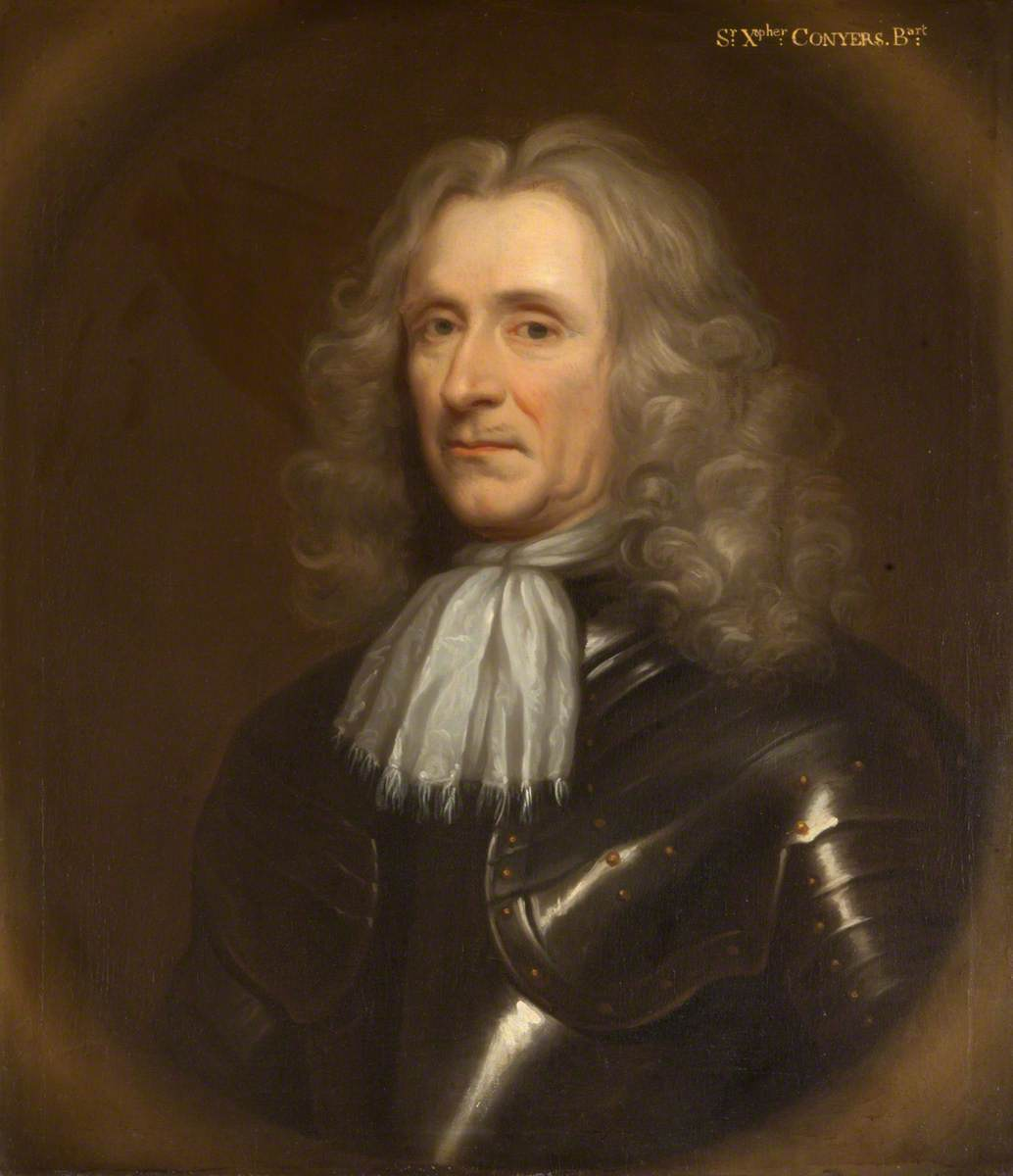
Sir Christopher Conyers, 2nd Baronet of Horden Hall

Sir Christopher Conyers, 2nd Baronet (1621–1693), was one of the Conyers baronets and Lord Lieutenant of Durham. He married, firstly Elizabeth Langhorne and secondly, Julia Lumley, the daughter of Richard Lumley, 1st Viscount Lumley.

His great-granddaughter, Teresa Conyers, became the Countess of Traquair; his son, Sir John Conyers, 3rd Baronet was the father of Sir Baldwin Conyers, 4th Baronet whose daughter, Teresa, married Charles Stewart, 5th Earl of Traquair.

Baronetage of England
Preceded by John Conyers	Baronet (of Horden); 1664–1693	Succeeded by John Conyers
