= Croft Hotel =

English historic hotel

Coordinates: 54.4825°N 1.5561°W

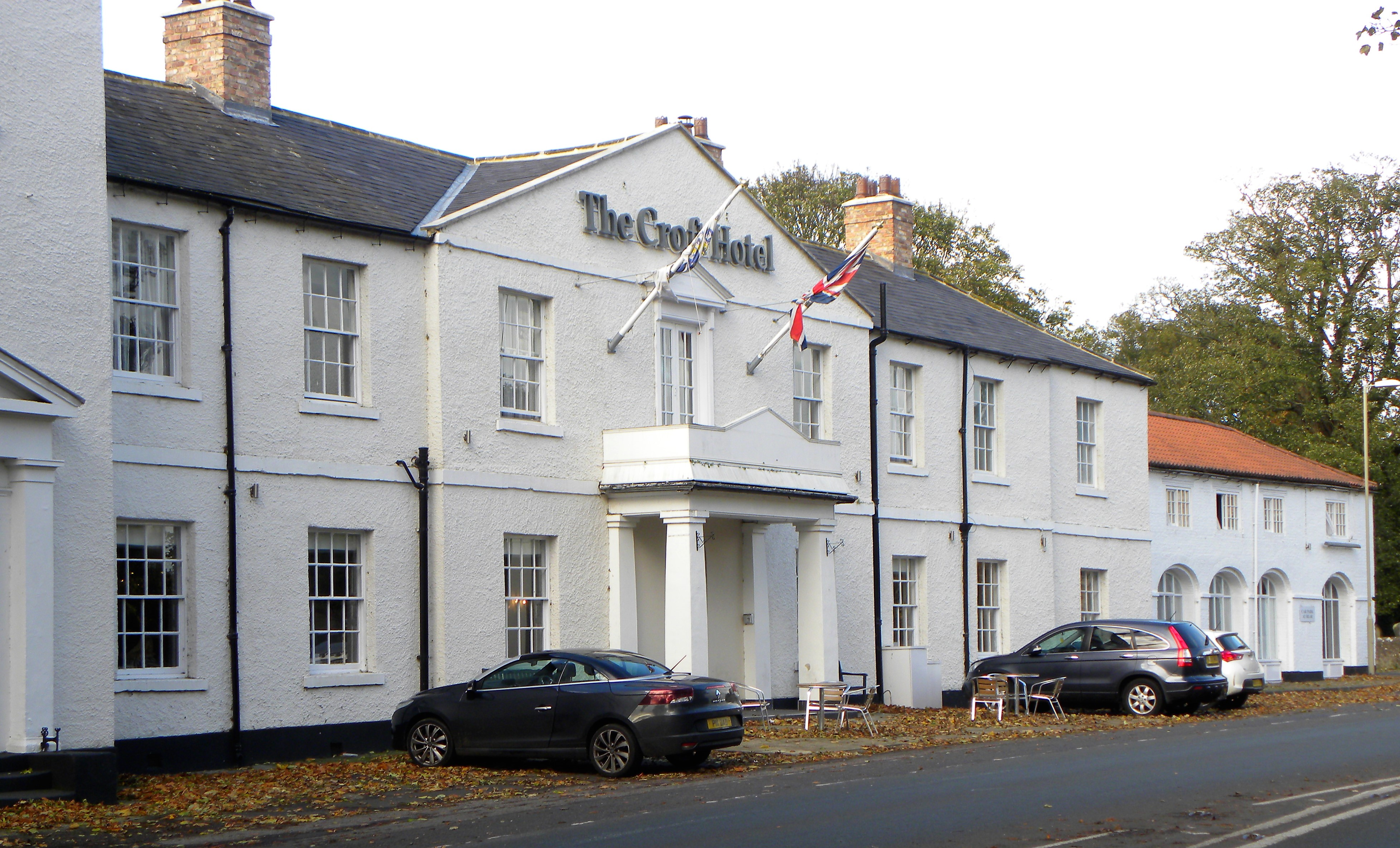
The hotel, in 2017

The Croft Hotel is a historic building in Croft-on-Tees, a village in North Yorkshire in England.

The hotel was constructed in 1835 by Ignatius Bonomi, to accommodate visitors to the old and new spas. In about 1860, a ballroom range was added to the west. The building was grade II listed in 1988. In 2023, it was purchased by the Apartment Group, which spent £2 million restoring the building. As of 2024, it offered 24 rooms, a function suite, gym and restaurant, and was marketed as a wedding venue.

The building is roughcast with a Welsh slate roof, and has two storeys and an irregular plan. The main entrance block projects slightly, and has a coped gable acting as a pediment. There are three bays, and in the centre is a porch with square Tuscan porch and a flat roof. The block is flanked by two bays on the left and three on the right. All the windows are sashes, the window above the doorway with an architrave and a pediment. To the left is the ballroom block, taller, with four bays, and in the right bay is a Tuscan doorway with a pediment. To the right is the former coach house, also lower, with a pantile roof and six bays. In the ground floor are segmental-arched openings, and the upper floor contains horizontally-sliding sash windows.

== See also ==
- Listed buildings in Croft-on-Tees
