= Conyers (given name) =

Conyers is a given name. Notable people with the name include:

- Conyers Clifford (c. 1566 – 1599), English politician and military commander
- Conyers Darcy (c. 1685 – 1758), British Army officer and politician
- Conyers Darcy, 7th Baron Darcy de Knayth (1570–1653), English nobleman
- Conyers Darcy, 1st Earl of Holderness (1598/99–1689), English nobleman
- Conyers Darcy, 2nd Earl of Holderness (1622–1692), English nobleman
- Conyers Middleton (1683–1750), English clergyman
- Conyers Kirby (1884–1946), English footballer
- Conyers Herring (1914–2009), American physicist

== See also ==
- Conyers (surname)
- Conyers baronets
