= Listed buildings in Croft-on-Tees =

Croft-on-Tees is a civil parish in the county of North Yorkshire, England. It contains 31 listed buildings that are recorded in the National Heritage List for England. Of these, two are listed at Grade I, the highest of the three grades, and the others are at Grade II, the lowest grade. The parish contains the village of Croft-on-Tees and the surrounding countryside. Most of the listed buildings are houses, cottages and associated structures, farmhouses and farm buildings, and the others include a church, a tomb in the churchyard, three bridges and a hotel.

== Key ==
Grade	Criteria
I	Buildings of exceptional interest, sometimes considered to be internationally important
II	Buildings of national importance and special interest

== Buildings ==
Name and location	Photograph	Date	Notes	Grade
Church of St Peter; 54.48315°N 1.55581°W		12th century	The church has been altered and extended through the centuries, including restorations in 1876 and 1887. It is built in red and brown sandstone, with roofs of Westmorland slate and lead. The church consists of a nave, north and south aisles, a south porch, a chancel with a north vestry, and a southwest tower. The tower has two stages, a stepped buttress, a string course, a two-light pointed-arched window, a sundial, a clock face with coats of arms in the corners, bell openings with pointed heads, and an embattled parapet. The porch has a double-chamfered arch on corbel capitals, and contains medieval tombstones used as benches. The inner doorway has a moulded pointed arch. There is an embattled parapet on the nave.	I
Croft Bridge; 54.48310°N 1.55418°W		14th century (probable)	The bridge, which has been restored and widened, is in sandstone, and about 160 metres (520 ft) long. It consists of six double-chamfered pointed arches, with triangular cutwaters which rise to form semi-octagonal refuges. The parapet projects on shield-shaped brackets on the downstream side, and on modillions on the upstream side. There is a dated plaque with an illegible inscription, the end walls are splayed, and have terminal cylindrical piers with ogee-domed caps.	I
Clow Beck packhorse bridge 54.48481°N 1.56800°W		15th century (possible)	The packhorse bridge crossing Clow Beck is in limestone with some brick. It consists of two segmental arches, each with voussoirs, forming a bent bridge. The central pier has a rounded cutwater on the upstream side, and the low parapet has chamfered coping. The deck is cobbled.	II
Croft Hall; 54.48059°N 1.55718°W		15th century	A manor house that has been much altered, in roughcast red sandstone, with painted stone dressings, on a chamfered plinth, with chamfered rusticated quoins, a coped parapet, and a hipped tile roof. There are three storeys and an L-shaped plan, with a front range of four bays, and a rear wing on the right. The central doorway has a fanlight with decorative glazing and a keystone, and the windows are sashes with keystones. The right return has two bays, and contains a French window.	II
Jolby Manor; 54.48647°N 1.60363°W		Early to mid 17th century	A manor house in sandstone, with chamfered rusticated quoins and a tile roof. There are two storeys and attics, and an L-shaped plan, with a main range of five bays and a rear wing. The doorway is in the centre, and the windows either have a single light or chamfered mullions and hood moulds. In the centre is a dormer in a stone coped gable with shaped kneelers, and below it is a moulded panel. In the angle at the rear is a re-set doorway with a moulded surround, a stepped base, a cornice on consoles and pedimented moulding.	II
Garden wall, Ashgrove; 54.48119°N 1.55583°W	—	Late 17th to early 18th century	The garden wall runs to the south for about 30 metres (98 ft). It is in red sandstone, about 2 metres (6 ft 7 in) high, and has brick-on-end coping.	II
Gate piers and walls, Croft Hall; 54.48108°N 1.55747°W		Early 18th century	At the entrance to the drive are two gate piers in painted stone with a square plan, in chamfered rustication on square bases, with entablatures, cornices and urns on stepped bases. They are flanked by quadrant walls, partly roughcast, with brown sandstone coping. These end in brown stone piers with a square plan and cornice caps with pyramidal tops.	II
Monk End Hall; 54.48414°N 1.55812°W		Early 18th century	The house, which contains earlier material, is in brown brick, with a dentilled eaves course and a hipped Westmorland slate roof. There is a U-shaped plan, with a main range of three storeys and five bays. In the centre of the east front is a round-arched doorway with Roman Doric three-quarter columns with fluted capitals, an entablature with paterae, a fanlight with decorative glazing, and an open pediment. The windows are sashes with flat brick arches. At the rear is a chamfered mullioned basement window, and in the left return is a two-storey canted bay window.	II
Gate pier and wall, Monk End Hall; 54.48356°N 1.55653°W	—	Early 18th century (probable)	The gate pier and wall are in red sandstone. The pier has a square plan and a stepped top, and is about 3 metres (9.8 ft) high. The wall extends for about 4 metres (13 ft), it is about 2 metres (6 ft 7 in) high, and contains a doorway.	II
The Limes; 54.48175°N 1.55543°W		Early 18th century	A roughcast cottage with stepped eaves, and a concrete tile roof with stone coping on the right. There are two storeys, two bays, and a rear lean-to. The central doorway has a fanlight, and the windows are casements.	II
The Old Rectory and wall 54.48317°N 1.55713°W	—	Early 18th century	The rectory, later a private house, is in orange brick, with string courses, and a hipped Westmorland slate roof. There is an irregular plan, with a main range of three storeys and five bays, a two-storey lean-to on the left, and later rear additions. The central doorway has an architrave on swept bases, and a dentilled pediment on consoles. The windows are sashes with flat arches of contrasting gauged brick. To the right is a single-storey curving screen wall.	II
Farmhouse and outbuildings, East Vince Moor; 54.46054°N 1.56218°W		Mid 18th century	The farmhouse is in red brick, with stone dressings, and a pantile roof with stone coped gables and kneelers. There are two storeys and three bays, and a later rear range. In the centre is a gabled porch with a four-centred arched opening, and a doorway with a fanlight. The windows are casements with wedge lintels. To the right is a stable with two hay loft openings.	II
South Lodges: north lodge and screen walls 54.45401°N 1.61053°W	—	Mid 18th century	The lodge to the former Halnaby Hall is in brick on a stone plinth, with stone dressings, a sill band, a modillion cornice, and a hipped Westmorland slate roof. There are two storeys and one bay, with later rear extensions. In the centre is a two-storey recessed round-arched panel containing a double-chamfered two-light mullioned window in each floor. In the left return is a blind oculus. The lodge is flanked by stone coped screen walls, the left wall with a chamfered light vent, and the right wall containing a mullioned window.	II
South Lodges: south lodge and screen walls 54.45389°N 1.61040°W	—	Mid 18th century	The lodge to the former Halnaby Hall is in brick on a stone plinth, with stone dressings, a sill band, a modillion cornice, and a hipped Westmorland slate roof. There are two storeys and one bay, with later rear extensions. In the centre is a two-storey recessed round-arched panel containing a double-chamfered two-light mullioned window in each floor. In the right return is a blind oculus. The lodge is flanked by stone coped screen walls, the right wall with a casement window, and the left wall containing a mullioned window.	II
Walled garden and orangery 54.45507°N 1.59952°W	—	Mid 18th century	The garden of the former Halnaby Hall is enclosed by a red brick wall with brown sandstone dressings and a stone coping, and it contains wrought iron gates. In the centre of the north wall is an orangery with a Westmorland slate roof, containing sash windows.	II
Stable block, Monk End Hall; 54.48437°N 1.55821°W	—	Late 18th century	A stable block and coach house converted for residential use, in red sandstone and brick, with quoins and a hipped pantile roof. There are two storeys and seven bays. The ground floor contains blocked segmental-arched coach entrances with sash windows inserted, segmental-arched doorways, and windows with flat heads. In the upper floor are square openings, some with sash windows.	II
Bay Horse Farmhouse; 54.46962°N 1.54841°W		Late 18th to early 19th century	The farmhouse, later a private house, is in brick, with stepped eaves, and a pantile roof with raised verges and stepped brick kneelers. There are two storeys and two bays. In the centre is a doorway converted into a casement window, and the other windows are horizontally-sliding sashes with flat arches.	II
Woodbine Cottage; 54.48185°N 1.55546°W		Late 18th to early 19th century	A roughcast house that has an M-shaped concrete tile roof with stone coping. There are two storeys, a double depth plan, and three bays. The central round-arched doorway has a fanlight with decorative glazing, and the windows are sashes.	II
Outbuilding, Old Spa Villa; 54.47778°N 1.56625°W		1808 (possible)	The outbuilding is rendered, with red sandstone dressings, chamfered rusticated quoins, and a pantile roof. There is a single storey and three bays, the middle bay projecting slightly, and the roof raised over it. In each bay is an opening with a pointed arch and a hood mould, those in the outer bays containing a sash window. The doors are in the right return.	II
The Croft Hotel; 54.48250°N 1.55614°W		1808	The hotel, which was extended in 1835 by Ignatius Bonomi, is roughcast with a Welsh slate roof, and has two storeys and an irregular plan. The main entrance block projects slightly, and has a coped gable acting as a pediment. There are three bays, and in the centre is a porch with square Tuscan porch and a flat roof. The block is flanked by two bays on the left and three on the right. All the windows are sashes, the window above the doorway with an architrave and a pediment. To the left is the ballroom block, taller, with four bays, and in the right bay is a Tuscan doorway with a pediment. To the right is the former coach house, also lower, with a pantile roof and six bays. In the ground floor are segmental-arched openings, and the upper floor contains horizontally-sliding sash windows.	II
Old Spa Villa; 54.47799°N 1.56634°W		Early 19th century	The house is in brown brick, with floor and eaves bands, and hipped tile roofs. There are two storeys, three bays, flanking single-storey two-bay wings, and a rear outshut. In the centre is a blocked recessed doorway and a blank window above, and the other windows are sashes. The outer bays contain doorways with fanlights, and all the openings have flat brick arches.	II
Spa Cottages; 54.47718°N 1.55730°W	—	Early 19th century	A coach house and house combined into one house, it is in sandstone, and has a pantile roof with stone coping and brick kneelers. There are two storeys and a continuous rear outshut. The former coach house has four bays, and contains four segmental arched openings in the ground floor. The house has two bays, and in both parts are sash windows.	II
Ashgrove; 54.48134°N 1.55608°W	—	Early to mid 19th century	A cottage in grey-brown brick, with oversailing eaves, and Welsh slate roofs, with stone coping on the left, and hipped on the right. There is one storey, a three-depth plan, and a front of two bays. The round-arched doorway contains a fanlight with decorative glazing bars, and the windows are sashes. In the left return are three bays divided by pilasters.	II
Bridge House; 54.48209°N 1.55509°W	—	Early to mid 19th century	The house is in brown brick on a stone plinth, with a floor band, oversailing eaves, and a hipped Westmorland slate roof. There are two storeys and three bays. In the centre is a doorway with a stone architrave and a fanlight with decorative glazing, flanked by segmental bay windows. In the upper floor are sash windows with wedge lintels. The right return has two bays and contains a French window and a square bay window.	II
Entrance gateway, Bridge House; 54.48218°N 1.55571°W	—	Early to mid 19th century	The gateway is in wrought iron, and contains a central pair of gates with swept tops, square bars, scrolled lower panels and mid-panels of interlocking circles, and box-section gate piers. The standards have cast iron finials, and in the centre of the top rail of the gates is a deer's head.	II
The Terrace; 54.48119°N 1.55840°W	—	Early to mid 19th century	A lodging house, later four houses, in brown brick, with a moulded stone cornice, and a tile roof, hipped on the left and coped on the right. There are two storeys and seven bays, and three lower rear wings. The outer bays project slightly, and the inner five bays are divided by pilasters carrying a frieze. The windows are sashes with flat arches.	II
Tees Railway Bridge; 54.47737°N 1.55272°W		1838–41	The bridge, designed by Henry Walsh to carry the Great North of England Railway over the River Tees, is in sandstone, and extends for about 100 metres (330 ft). It consists of four segmental skew arches. The piers have rounded cutwaters with domed tops, decorative panels, and chamfered impost bands. The arch tunnels, voussoirs and spandrels have chamfered rustication. The parapet is coped, above the piers are refuges, and at the ends are piers with pyramidal caps.	II
Former coach house, Clervaux Castle; 54.47588°N 1.58400°W	—	c. 1843	The coach house, later used for other purposes, was designed by Ignatius Bonomi and John Augustus Cory. It is in red sandstone with quoins, embattled parapets, a Westmorland slate roof, and nine bays. In the first bay is a three-storey tower, containing a doorway with a quoined surround, a ladder to the hay loft, and a clock in the upper storey. The other bays have two storeys, and the openings include a carriage entrance, doorways, a pitching hole, and slit vents.	II
Column and urn northeast of the walled garden 54.45533°N 1.59918°W	—	19th century	A stone garden feature in the grounds of Halnaby Hall, which was demolished in 1952. It consists of a granite Doric column on a plinth, on a base of three square steps. On the column is an urn with handles of intertwined serpents, and with the sides decorated with male masks.	II
Todd tomb 54.48299°N 1.55544°W		c. 1854	The tomb is in the churchyard of the Church of St Peter and is to the memory of John Todd. It is in sandstone, and has a moulded base. On the sides are panels with inscriptions and carved angels' heads, and on the ends are coats of arms. The top is moulded and gabled, and in the tympanum is a laurel wreath.	II
Sundial, Monk End Hall; 54.48395°N 1.55782°W	—	Mid to late 19th century	The sundial in the grounds of the house is in composition stone, and is about 3 metres (9.8 ft) high. It has a square base and a swept plinth, on which is a chamfered octagonal block, with dials on alternate faces and Tudor roses, and a ball finial on a swept base.	II
