= Croft Hall =

Historic building in Croft-on-Tees, North Yorkshire, England

Coordinates: 54°28′50″N 1°33′26″W

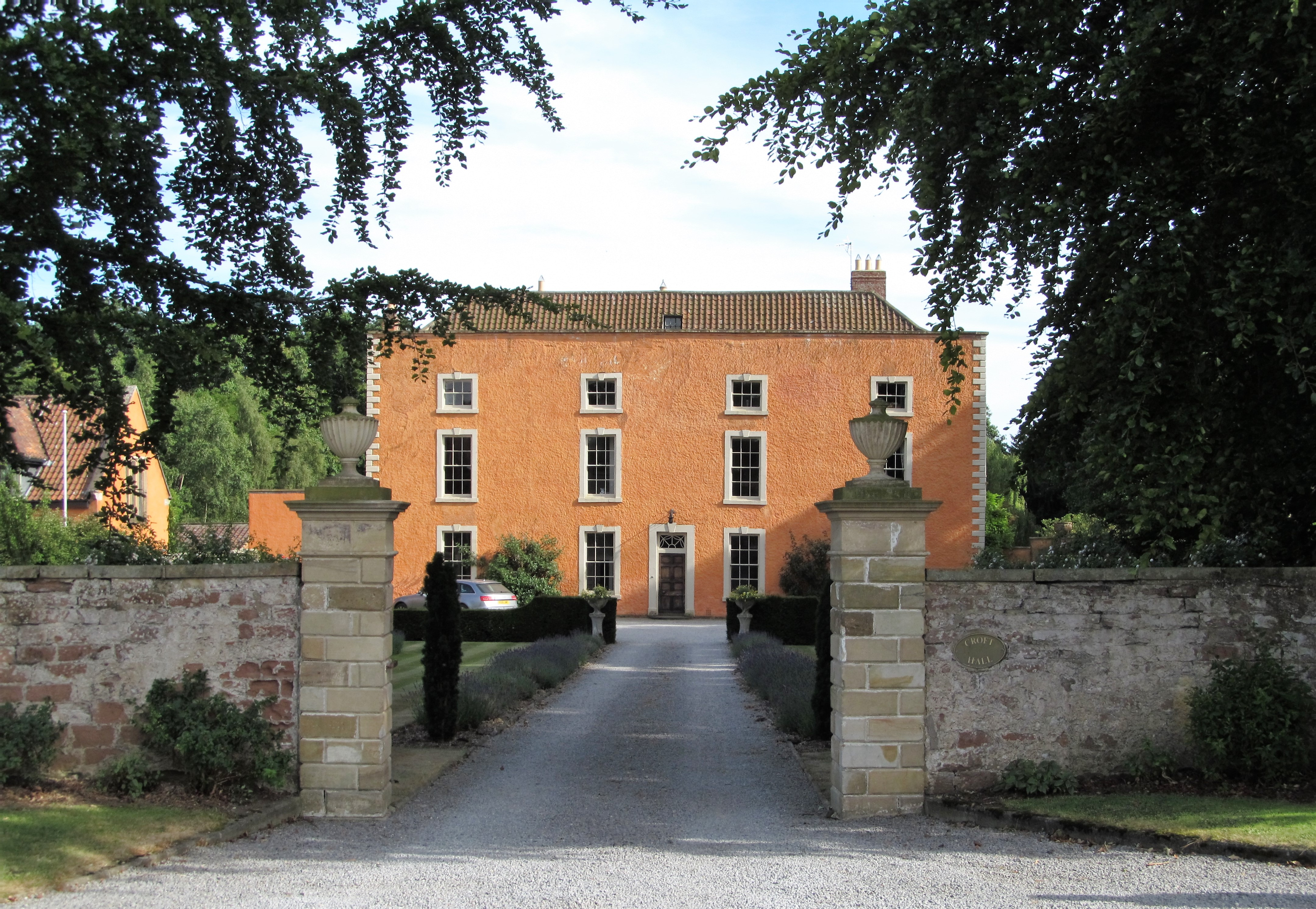
The building, in 2018

Croft Hall is a historic building in Croft-on-Tees, a village in North Yorkshire, in England.

The building was constructed as a manor house, probably in the 15th century, for Richard Clervaux. It was rebuilt in the late 16th century, for Christopher Chaytor, and in the early 18th century was remodelled in the classical style, for William Chaytor. It was modified in the 19th century, probably by Ignatius Bonomi. Its owner at the time, another William Chaytor, later built Clervaux Castle nearby, and relocated there, with the hall passing to another branch of the family. The building was grade II listed in 1951.

The house is constructed of roughcast red sandstone, with painted stone dressings, on a chamfered plinth, with chamfered rusticated quoins, a coped parapet, and a hipped tile roof. There are three storeys and an L-shaped plan, with a front range of four bays, and a rear wing on the right. The central doorway has a fanlight with decorative glazing and a keystone, and the windows are sashes with keystones. The right return has two bays, and contains a French window.

Inside the house is a 19th-century staircase and panelling, said to have been relocated from the old Mansion House in Newcastle upon Tyne. Other internal carvings have been moved from Ripon. The hall has a 5 acres (2.0 ha) garden, which was laid out in the early 20th century.

== See also ==
- Listed buildings in Croft-on-Tees
