= All Saints Church, Sockburn =

All Saints Church
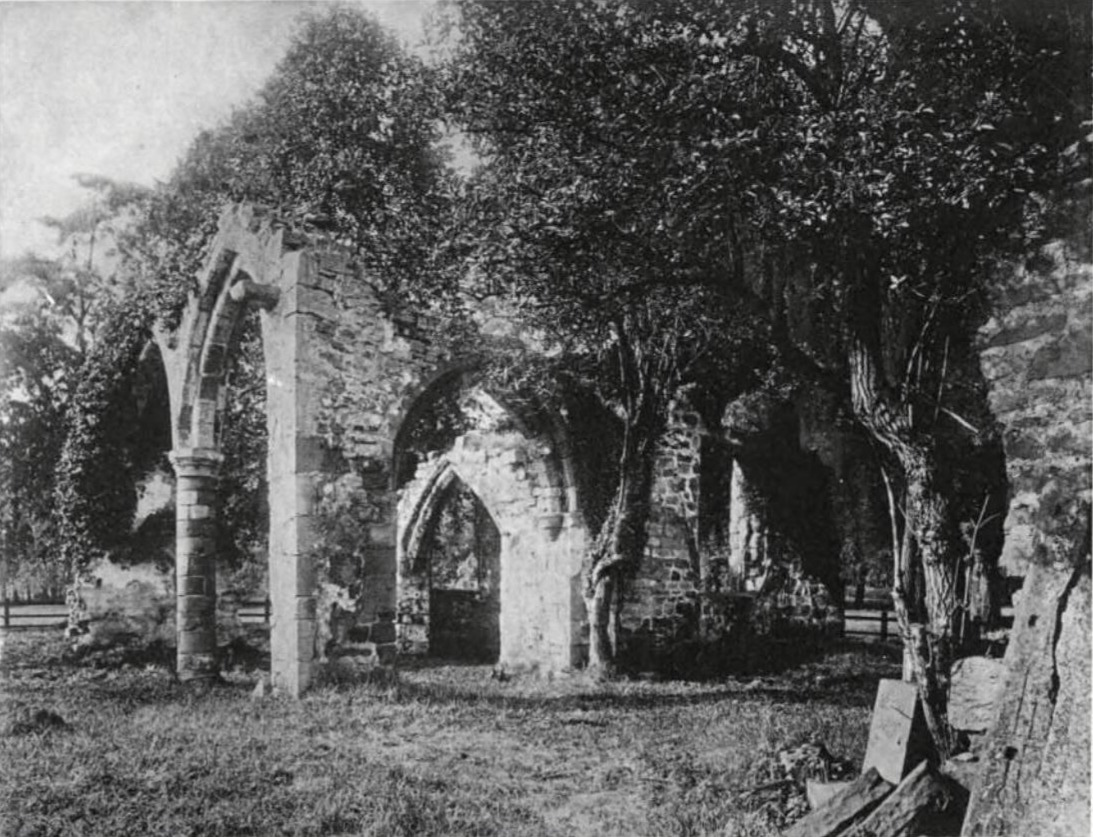
- Remains of the church in 1894
- All Saints Church
- 54.4582°N 1.4619°W
- OS grid reference: NZ 34982 07113
- Location: Sockburn, County Durham, England
- Country: England
- Denomination: Anglican

Architecture
- Architectural type: Church

Administration
- Province: York
- Diocese: Durham

All Saints Church is a ruined Church of England parish church in Sockburn, County Durham, England. A Grade I listed building, the church has pre- and post-Conquest mediaeval aspects, and is linked to the legends of the Sockburn Worm.

The church was in use until 1838, when it was replaced by All Saints' Church, Girsby, across the River Tees.
