= Listed buildings in Norton Conyers =

Norton Conyers is a civil parish in the county of North Yorkshire, England. It contains 17 listed buildings that are recorded in the National Heritage List for England. Of these, three are listed at Grade II*, the middle of the three grades, and the others are at Grade II, the lowest grade. The parish does not contain any settlements, and its major building is the country house Norton Conyers House. This is listed, and all the other listed buildings are associated with it. These include outbuildings and other structures, stables, an orangery, statues, gateways and a lodge.

== Key ==
Grade	Criteria
II*	Particularly important buildings of more than special interest
II	Buildings of national importance and special interest

== Buildings ==
Name and location	Photograph	Date	Notes	Grade
Norton Conyers House; 54.18097°N 1.51139°W		Medieval (probable)	A country house that has been altered and extended. It is in roughcast brick, with a moulded eaves cornice and a Westmorland slate roof. There are two storeys, and two ranges at right angles with four bays each. The southwest front has four ogee-curved gables, each containing a small oeil-de-boeuf window, and kneelers with ball finials. In the centre are double doors with pulvinated rusticated piers, a pair of Corinthian columns, an entablature, a frieze with swags, a dentilled cornice, and a broken triangular pediment with a heraldic shield. To the left is a mullioned and transomed hall window, the outer bays contain canted bay windows, and elsewhere are sash windows.	II*
The Old Stables, clock tower and wall 54.18095°N 1.51074°W		17th century	The former stables are in roughcast brick with a roof of Westmorland slate and stone slate. There are two storeys and eleven bays, and it contains a band and sash windows, some horizontally-sliding. On the right is a two-storey bay and a wall, and a two-storey bay linking the clock tower to the house. The clock tower consists of a wooden cupola with a square base, a clock face, a circular clock tower with columns, and a domed roof with a finial. The wall is coped, and carries leads urns decorated with masks and pineapple finials.	II
Ha-ha in front of Norton Conyers House and gateway south of the stables 54.17935°N 1.50966°W	—	Early 18th century	The ha-ha is in coped stone, and is about 1 metre (3 ft 3 in) high. The gate piers opposite the south entrance to the stables are in stone with ball finials, and are flanked by ramped walls.	II
Statue and pedestal west of Norton Conyers House; 54.18151°N 1.51183°W	—	Early 18th century	The statue is in lead, it stands on a stone pedestal, with a moulded base, fielded panels and a cornice, and is about 0.75 metres (2 ft 6 in) high. The statue depicts a male bearded figure in Roman military costume with a spear.	II
Gateway, Wath Lodge; 54.18688°N 1.50889°W		Early to mid 18th century	The carriage gates are in wrought iron, and are flanked by pedestrian gates in piers in rusticated stone. Each pier contains a flat arch, and has pilasters with an egg and dart motif, and an entablature. Above is a triangular pediment with deep eaves containing a motto. The pedestrian gates are in wood, the lower parts in Chinese style.	II*
Two urns south of the south garden wall, Norton Conyers House; 54.18147°N 1.51384°W	—	18th century	The urns are in stone on a brick base, and are about 1.2 metres (3 ft 11 in) high. Each urn has volutes supporting a gadrooned rim, and there are festoons around the bowl.	II
Four urns west of Norton Conyers House; 54.18145°N 1.51181°W	—	18th century	The urns are in lead on a stone plinth, and are about 1 metre (3 ft 3 in) high. Each urn is in the form of a two-handled cup with a cover, and stands on a square chamfered base. There is relief decoration, with acanthus leaves and classical figures, on the handles are birds' heads, and there is a pineapple finial.	II
Gate piers north of walled garden, Norton Conyers House; 54.18210°N 1.51347°W		18th century	The gate piers are in red sandstone, they are about 4 metres (13 ft) high, and have a rectangular plan. Each pier has a chamfered plinth, and a trefoil-headed recessed panel pierced by a cruciform aperture, with a cornice above.	II
Norton Gate; 54.17671°N 1.51014°W		18th century	The gates at the southern entrance to the grounds are in wrought iron, and are flanked by gate piers, walls and end piers. The gate piers are in stone with a square section and about 4 metres (13 ft) high. They have pulvinated rustication and deep coping; one is surmounted by an eagle and the other by a lion. The walls are in stone and coped, about 1.5 metres (4 ft 11 in) high, and ramped at the ends. The end piers are similar to the gate piers, but are surmounted by ball and cushion finials.	II
Statue and pedestal between the stables and Norton Conyers House; 54.18139°N 1.51233°W	—	18th century	The statue is in lead, it stands on a stone pedestal, and is about 2 metres (6 ft 7 in) high. The pedestal is in the form of clustered columns, with the capitals supporting a plinth. The statue depicts a naked youth, with drapery and a laurel wreath, leaning against a lyre.	II
Statue and surround to pool south of the orangery 54.18186°N 1.51427°W	—	18th century	The pool is circular, about 2.5 metres (8 ft 2 in) in diameter, and is lined with stone blocks. In the centre is a lead statue on a pedestal, about 1 metre (3 ft 3 in) high. The statue depicts an African man in feathered skirt, on one knee, holding an inscribed sundial on his head.	II
Walls, north gate piers and south gate and gate piers, Norton Conyers House; 54.18153°N 1.51426°W	—	Late 18th century	The garden walls are in red brick with stone coping, and are about 3 metres (9.8 ft) high. The north gate piers have a band, a cornice and a ball finial, and the south gate piers have a cornice and a ball finial on a plinth. The round-arched south gates are in wrought iron and are decorated. Above them is an overthrow with scrolls, leaf decoration and a winged emblem.	II
Orangery; 54.18193°N 1.51429°W		Late 18th century	The orangery is in stone and red brick, with a deep cornice, a parapet and a flat roof. The central block has five bays. In the middle are round-headed double doors, the outer bays contain round-headed sash windows, and all have a moulded archivolt and a double keystone. The block is flanked by greenhouses about 11 metres (36 ft) long.	II
Stable block, wall and gate piers 54.18173°N 1.51300°W		Late 18th century	The stable block is in rendered stone and brick, and has a Westmorland slate roof. It consists of a rectangular courtyard with ranges on three sides and a wall with a gateway on the east side. The north range has a central block with two storeys and three bays, flanked by single-storey two-bay wings, linked to two-storey two-bay end blocks. The central block has a floor band and a sill band, a moulded eaves course and a pediment. On the ground floor are round-arched doorways with fanlights, above the middle doorway is a Diocletian window with a keystone, and the outer bays contain square windows. The east wall has stone coping, and the gateway has piers with channelled quoins, and moulded capitals on plinths.	II*
Statue and pedestal south of the stable block 54.18138°N 1.51316°W	—	Late 18th century	The statue is in lead, it stands on a stone pedestal, and is about 2 metres (6 ft 7 in) high. The pedestal is in the form of clustered columns, with the capitals supporting a plinth. The statue is of the naked figure of the goddess Diana with drapery and a dog.	II
Gate, gate piers and ha-ha northeast of the stable block 54.18174°N 1.51249°W	—	Late 18th century	The gate is in wrought iron, and is about 1.5 metres (4 ft 11 in) high. The stone gate piers are square, about 2.5 metres (8 ft 2 in) high, and rusticated with a plain entablature, pyramidal caps and ball finials, and the ha-ha is about 1 metre (3 ft 3 in) high.	II
Wath Lodge; 54.18695°N 1.50891°W		Late 18th century	The lodge is in roughcast sandstone and has a Westmorland slate roof. There is a single storey and three bays. In the centre is a porch with a round-arched entrance and a triangular-pedimented head with kneelers, coping, and a wings motif in the tympanum. The outer bays contain windows with pointed-arched heads and a central mullion, and in the left return are two small square windows with hood moulds.	II
