= Monk End Hall =

Historic building in Croft-on-Tees, North Yorkshire, England

Coordinates: 54°29′03″N 1°33′29″W

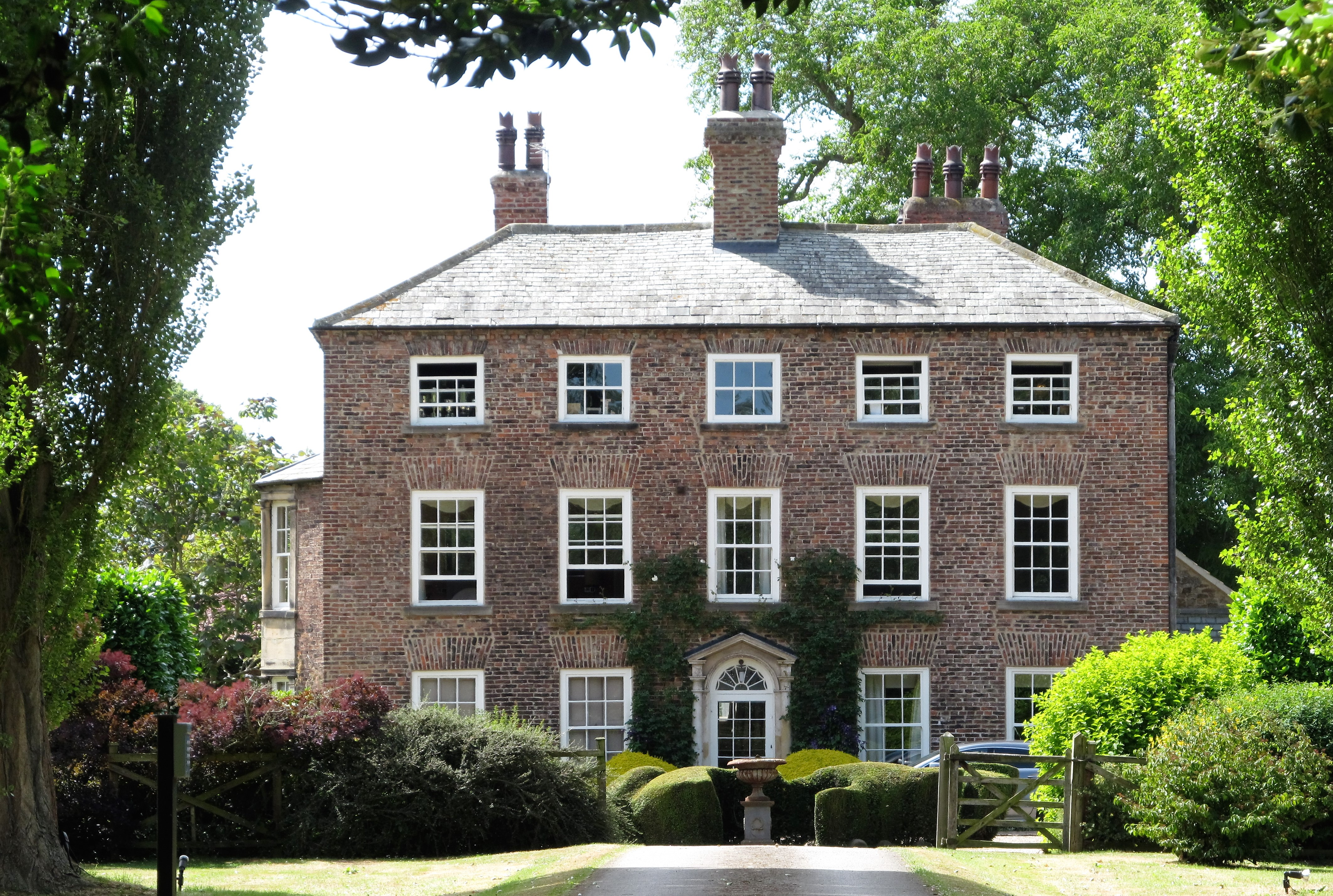
The house, in 2018

Monk End House is a historic building in Croft-on-Tees, a village in North Yorkshire, in England.

In the mediaeval period, a house on the site was owned by St Mary's Abbey, York. The current building may retain some 15th century material, but mainly dates from the early 18th century. At one time, the conservatory was used as a schoolroom. The house was grade II listed in 1968. In 2011, it was sold for £2.25 million, the most expensive property in the Darlington area between 2000 and 2024.

The house is built of brown brick, with a dentilled eaves course and a hipped Westmorland slate roof. There is a U-shaped plan, with a main range of three storeys and five bays. In the centre of the east front is a round-arched doorway with Roman Doric three-quarter columns with fluted capitals, an entablature with paterae, a fanlight with decorative glazing, and an open pediment. The windows are sashes with flat brick arches. At the rear is a chamfered mullioned basement window, and in the left return is a two-storey canted bay window.

== See also ==
- Listed buildings in Croft-on-Tees
