= Listed buildings in Hutton Conyers =

Hutton Conyers is a civil parish in the county of North Yorkshire, England. It contains four listed buildings that are recorded in the National Heritage List for England. All the listed buildings are designated at Grade II, the lowest of the three grades, which is applied to "buildings of national importance and special interest". The parish contains the villages of Hutton Conyers and Nunwick, and the listed buildings consist of a farmhouse, a barn and two houses.

== Buildings ==
Name and location	Photograph	Date	Notes
Hutton Hall; 54.16155°N 1.48885°W		16th century	The farmhouse has a timber framed core, and walls of sandstone in the lower part and brown brick above, with a cogged eaves course, and stepped eaves. The roof is in stone slate with pantile at the rear. The house consists of a hall range of two storeys and two bays, flanked by cross-wings with two storeys and attics. The windows are casements, those in the attics are blind.
Barn at Nunwick House Farm; 54.16539°N 1.50743°W		16th century (possible)	The barn has a timber framed core, walls of brick and cobble, and a pantile roof with eaves courses of stone slate, hipped on the left. There is one storey and four bays. The openings include two doorways.
Blois Hall; 54.14774°N 1.47306°W		Mid 18th century	A house, later used for other purposes, in red sandstone, painted on the front, with a tile roof, pyramidal in the centre block and hipped on the wings. The central block has three storeys and three bays and is flanked by two-storey, two-bay wings. The doorway has a lintel with a keystone. The windows are a mix of sashes and casements, and all have keystones.
Hutton Moor House; 54.16344°N 1.46824°W		Mid to late 18th century	The house is in sandstone, with a floor band, paired stone gutter brackets, and a hipped stone slate roof. There are two storeys and five bays. The doorway has a rectangular fanlight and four keystones. To its left is a large plate glass window, and the other windows are sashes, those in the ground floor each with four keystones.
