= Hamon de Clervaulx =

Norman nobleman

Sir Hamon de Clervaulx or Clervaux (fl. 1066)
- Born: Haute-Normandie, France
- House: Clervaux [sic]

Sir Hamon de Clervaulx or Clervaux (fl. 1066) was a Norman knight who arrived in England with the Norman Conquest in 1066 to fight at the Battle of Hastings, after which he was granted lands at Bootham, Yorkshire, where the shield of his family was stationed at Richmond Castle. He is listed as a companion of William the Conqueror in the Battle Abbey Roll.

== Descendants ==
His descendants in England usually spelled their surname 'Clervaux' without the second 'l'. They moved to the manor of Croft-on-Tees and developed Croft Hall. Sir Richard Clervaux is buried in the south aisle of Croft Church.

Their last heiress was Elizabeth Clervaux, whose marriage to Christopher Chaytor of Beautrove or Butterby, County Durham, Surveyor General of Durham and Northumberland, united their families. The Chaytor family consequently named Clervaux Castle, Yorkshire, which they built in 1842 but which was demolished in 1951, after their Clervaux [sic] ancestors.

Their other descendants include the Fenwick family of clergy, of Northumberland, and the Boyd family of merchant bankers, of County Durham and Newcastle. A son of Major-General Richard Clement Moody, the founder of British Columbia, received the middle name 'de Clervaux' [sic] after his maternal ancestor.

== Coat of arms ==
The blazon of the coat-of-arms of the House of Clervaux is ‘a crane proper, wrapped gules’, which was adapted into the coat-of-arms of their heirs, the Chaytor family. Their motto was ‘Fortune le veut’ (sc. 'fortune wishes it').
