= Conyers (surname) =

Conyers is a surname. Notable people with the name include:

- Brad Conyers, drummer for The Ziggens
- Christopher Conyers, 2nd Baron Conyers (died 1538)
- David Conyers (born 1971), Australian science fiction writer
- Edward Conyers (fl. 1725–1734), English member of parliament for East Grinstead
- Evelyn Conyers (1870–1944), Australian Army nurse
- Herb Conyers (1921–1964), American baseball player
- Ian Conyers (born 1988), American politician
- Jalin Conyers (born 2001), American football player
- John Conyers (1929–2019), a U.S. Representative from Michigan
- John Conyers (politician, born 1650) (1650–1725), English member of parliament East Grinstead and West Looe
- John Conyers (politician, born 1717) (1717–1775), English member of parliament for Essex and Reading
- John Conyers, 3rd Baron Conyers (before 1538–1557), English aristocrat
- Sir John Conyers, 1st Baronet (died 1664), of the Conyers baronets
- Sir John Conyers, 3rd Baronet (1649–1719), of the Conyers baronets
- Monica Conyers (born 1964), American politician
- Sir Reginald Conyers (1879–1948), Bermudian lawyer and politician
- Thomas Conyers (c. 1666–1728), English member of parliament
- Thomas Conyers (fl. 1590), founder of Conyer's School, Yarm, Yorkshire, England
- William Conyers, 1st Baron Conyers (1468–1524), English nobleman

== See also ==
- Conyers baronets
- Conyers (given name)
