= Sockburn Worm =

Northumbrian folkloric creature

In the folklore of Northumbria, the Sockburn Worm was a ferocious wyvern that laid waste to the village of Sockburn in Durham. It was said that the beast was finally slain by John Conyers. The tale is said to be the inspiration for Lewis Carroll's poem Jabberwocky which he wrote while in Croft-on-Tees and Whitburn.

== Possible origins ==
The tale of the worm may be inspired by the longships of marauding Vikings, who carved the heads of Worms (Ormr) on the bow; however, this does not take into account the commonness of dragons in Germanic folklore including that of Northumbria (see the Laidly and Lambton Worms as well as the Worm of Linton).

== Traditions ==
Each newly appointed Bishop of Durham, on crossing the River Tees and entering the bishopric for the first time at Croft-on-Tees, the southern-most point in the diocese, either by the local ford or over Croft Bridge, was presented with the Conyers Falchion – a medieval sword kept at Durham Cathedral, said to be the one with which Sir John Conyers slew the worm.

The Lord of Sockburn traditionally read a speech while presenting the blade:

"My Lord Bishop. I hereby present you with the falchion wherewith the champion Conyers slew the worm, dragon or fiery flying serpent which destroyed man, woman and child; in memory of which the king then reigning gave him the manor of Sockburn, to hold by this tenure, that upon the first entrance of every bishop into the county the falchion should be presented."

The bishop would then take the falchion, and immediately return it, wishing the holder health and long enjoyment of the manor.

The tradition is said to have lapsed from 1771, although it is mentioned in a late 19th century account of bishop William Van Mildert's entry into the county in 1826. The sword was given to Durham Cathedral in 1947. The ceremony was revived by bishop David Jenkins in 1984, with the sword being presented to the bishop (with the same traditional speech) by the Mayor of Darlington. In 2026, bishop Rick Simpson was greeted and presented with the sword on the banks of the Tees rather than on Croft Bridge as he was appointed from within the diocese.

The Sockburn Worm, with the falchion embedded in it, appears on the district badge of the local Darlington & District Scout Association.

== See also ==
- All Saints Church, Sockburn
- Conyers baronets
