= Richard Lumley, 1st Viscount Lumley =

English royalist

The Right Honourable The Viscount Lumley
- Lumley arms: Argent a fesse gules between three parrots vert, collared of the second

Personal details
- Born: 7 April 1589
- Died: 12 March 1663 (aged 73)
- Parents: Roger Lumley (father); Anne Kurtswich (mother)
- Relatives: Richard Lumley, 1st Earl of Scarbrough (grandson)

Richard Lumley, 1st Viscount Lumley (7 April 1589 – 12 March 1663) was an English royalist and military commander. He was the grandfather of Richard Lumley, 1st Earl of Scarbrough.

Richard Lumley was baptized at Chester-le-Street, County Durham, on 7 July 1589, the son of Roger Lumley and Anne (née Kurtswich), and grandson of Anthony Lumley. He was the great-grandson of Richard Lumley, 3rd Baron Lumley who was summoned to Parliament in 1509. (The 3rd Baron's father, Thomas, predeceased the 3rd Baron's grandfather, George the 2nd Baron). He was a first cousin of John Lumley, 1st Baron Lumley.

He was a loyalist to the crown during the time of the English Civil Wars. He made the family seat, Lumley Castle, into a garrison. He was made principal commander under Prince Rupert, and marched into the west of England and fought at the Siege of Bristol where he remained until Rupert surrendered it in 1645.

For his loyalty to the crown, Lumley was knighted by King James on 19 July 1616 at Theobalds. On 12 July 1628, he was created Viscount Lumley of Waterford in the Peerage of Ireland. On 25 April 1660, Lumley was among the group of loyalists who issued a declaration in Parliament to support the King's Declaration of Breda.

He married Frances, daughter of Henry Shelley of Warminghurst Park.

Their daughter, Julia, married Sir Christopher Conyers, 2nd Baronet of Horden. Their son, the Hon. John Lumley, predeceased his father in 1658. Viscount Lumley was succeeded in the viscountcy by his grandson, who was made the first Earl of Scarbrough in 1690. Richard's second wife in 1630 was Elizabeth Sandys (née Cornwallis) who in 1657 endowed a grammar school in Pickering, which continues today as Lady Lumley's School.

Peerage of Ireland
New creation	Viscount Lumley; 1628–1663	Succeeded by Richard Lumley
