= Over Dinsdale =

Village and civil parish in North Yorkshire, England

Coordinates: 54.499°N 1.462°W

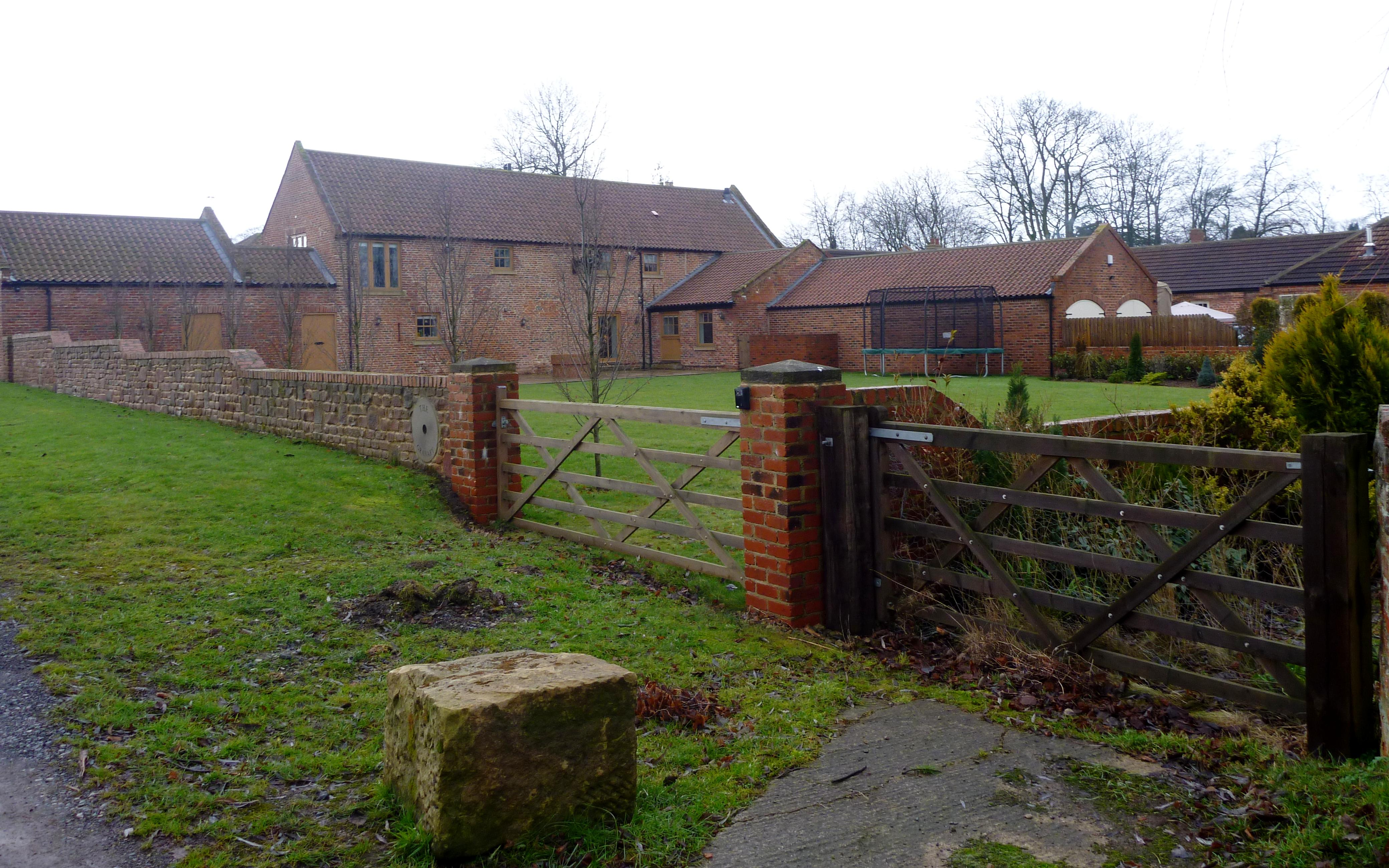
- The Granary in Over Dinsdale

- Location within North Yorkshire
- OS grid reference: NZ349116
- Unitary authority: North Yorkshire
- Ceremonial county: North Yorkshire
- Region: Yorkshire and the Humber
- Country: England
- Sovereign state: United Kingdom
- Post town: Darlington
- Postcode district: DL2
- Police: North Yorkshire
- Fire: North Yorkshire
- Ambulance: Yorkshire
- UK Parliament: Richmond and Northallerton

Over Dinsdale is a small village and civil parish in the county of North Yorkshire, England. The population of the village (including Girsby) taken at the 2011 census was 151. The village straddles an ancient Roman road on the border with County Durham, on a peninsula in the River Tees, approximately 6 miles (9.7 km) from Darlington and 8.5 miles (13.7 km) from Yarm. The Teesdale Way passes through the village.

Historically the village was a township in the ancient parish of Sockburn, a parish divided by the River Tees between the North Riding of Yorkshire (which included Over Dinsdale) and County Durham (which included the township of Sockburn). Over Dinsdale became a separate civil parish in 1866.

From 1974 to 2023 it was part of the Hambleton District, it is now administered by the unitary North Yorkshire Council.

The neighbouring village of Low Dinsdale is across the river in County Durham.

The name Dinsdale derives from Old English and means either 'Dyttin's nook of land' or 'nook of land belonging to Deighton'.

== See also ==
- Listed buildings in Over Dinsdale
