= Croft-on-Tees =

Village and civil parish in North Yorkshire, England

Coordinates: 54°29′00″N 1°33′23″W

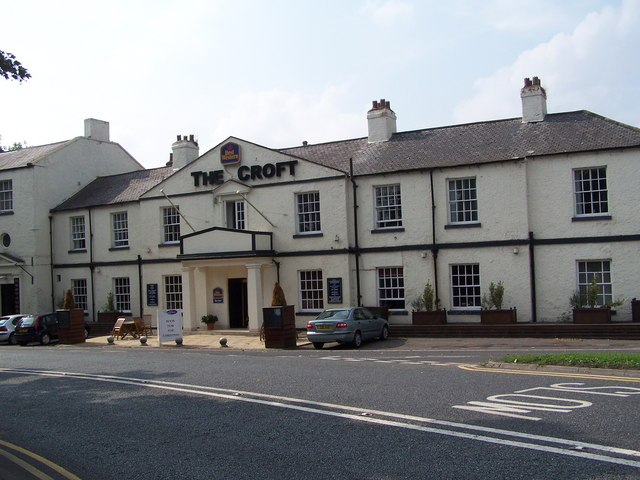
- The Croft Hotel

- Location within North Yorkshire
- Population: 466 (2011)
- OS grid reference: NZ289097
  - London: 210 mi (340 km) SSE
- Unitary authority: North Yorkshire
- Ceremonial county: North Yorkshire
- Region: Yorkshire and the Humber
- Country: England
- Sovereign state: United Kingdom
- Post town: DARLINGTON
- Postcode district: DL2
- Dialling code: 01325
- Police: North Yorkshire
- Fire: North Yorkshire
- Ambulance: Yorkshire
- UK Parliament: Richmond and Northallerton

Croft-on-Tees is a village and civil parish in North Yorkshire, England. It has also been known as Croft Spa, and from which the former Croft Spa railway station took its name. It lies 11 miles (18 km) north-north west of the county town of Northallerton.

== History ==
The village is mentioned in the Domesday Book of 1086 as Crofst. It makes no mention of any lord of the manor prior to the Norman Conquest, but names Enisant Musard as lord after 1086, granted to him by Count Alan of Brittany. The lands were subject to many years of dispute until the 13th century. In 1205, King John settled the issue by granting the lands to Roald the Constable of Richmond. His heirs inherited the title until 1299 when they were succeeded by Henry le Scrope of Bolton. Thereafter the lands were held by the Clervaux family until 1590 when their unbroken male-line ceased and their estate became property of the Chaytor family, who retained it until the 20th century. Numerous historic houses survive, including Croft Hall, Jolby Manor, and Monk End Hall.

The etymology of the village name comes from the Old English word Croft meaning a small enclosed field.

Croft was once significant for its spa, first noticed in 1668, and as early as 1713 the sulphurous spring water had acquired such fame that it was sold in London as a cure for ailments and diseases, as described in Robert Willan's study of the sulphur water at Croft, published in London in 1782. A.B. Granville's description of the "Old Well" and the "New Well" described the Croft Spa for which the railway station was both opened and named. It was published in 1841.

The village was once served by its railway station on the East Coast Main Line. The railway still passes near Croft but the station, which was opened in 1841, closed in 1968 and has been demolished.

The 1861 Epsom Derby winner Kettledrum was bred at Croft in 1858.

== Geography and governance ==
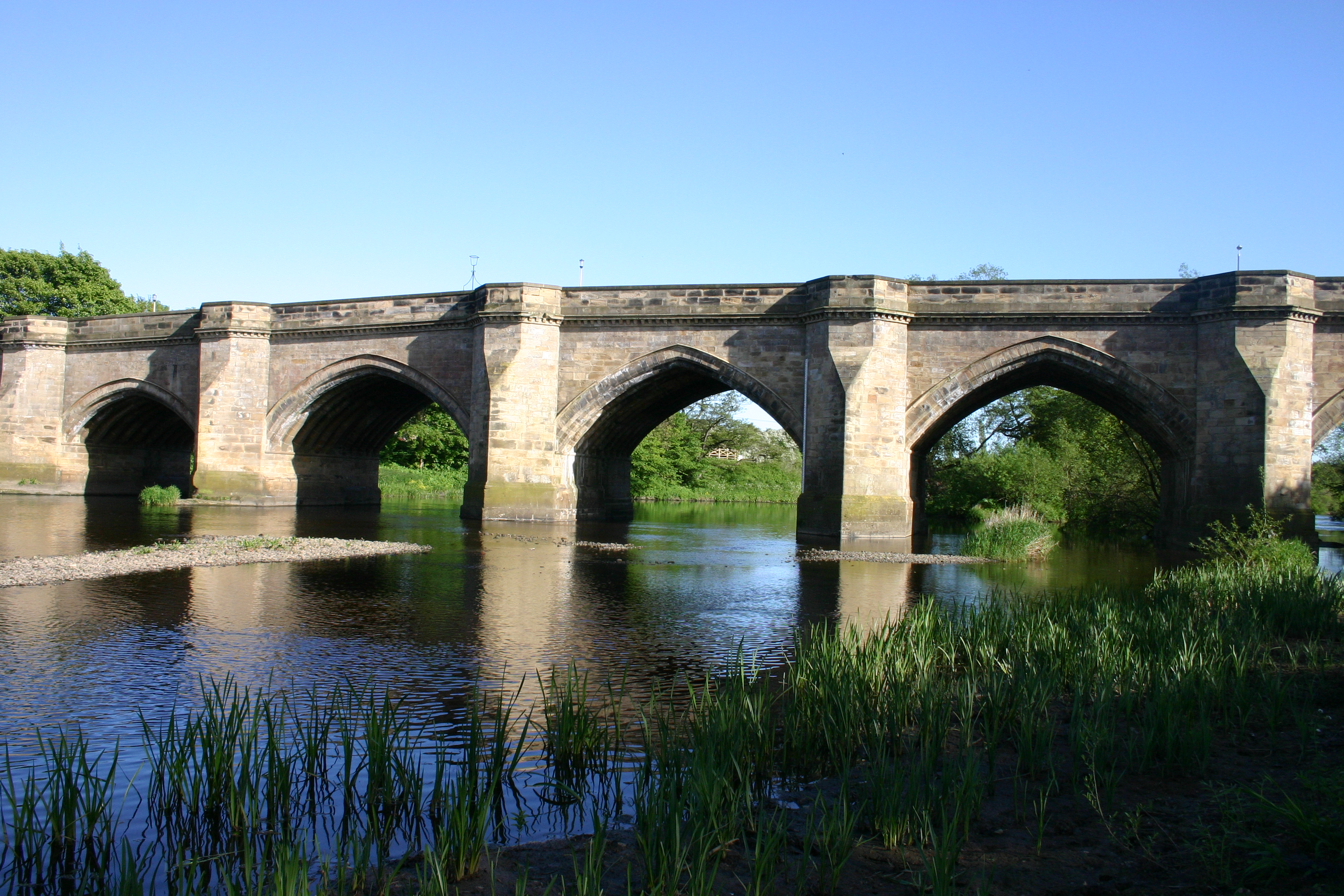
Croft Bridge carrying the A167 over the Tees

3 miles (4.8 km) south of Darlington, Croft stands on the opposite side of the River Tees from Hurworth-on-Tees between Clow Beck and Spa Beck and is situated on the A167. The bridge over the Tees between Croft and Hurworth marks the boundary between North Yorkshire and County Durham. The exact point of transition is the fourth of the seven arches. It is a Grade I listed building. The settlements of Eryholme and Dalton-on-Tees are also within three miles of the village.

From 1974 to 2023 it was part of the district of Richmondshire, it is now administered by the unitary North Yorkshire Council. The village lies within the Richmond and Northallerton UK Parliament constituency and the Richmondshire North electoral division of North Yorkshire Council.

An electoral ward in the name of Croft exists. This ward stretches south to North Cowton with a population taken at the 2011 census of 1,272.

== Demography ==
Population
Year	1801	1811	1821	1831	1841	1851	1881	1891	1901	1911	1921	1931	1951	1961	2001	2011
Total	543	563	648	692	744	750	537	459	465	494	509	501	680	480	427	466

=== 2001 Census ===
According to the 2001 UK Census, the parish was 50.6% male and 49.4% female of the total population of 427. The religious make-up was 86.4% Christian with the rest stating no religion. The ethnic distribution was 100% White. There were 180 dwellings.

=== 2011 Census ===
According to the 2011 UK Census, the parish had a total population of 466 with 50% male and 50% female. The religious make-up was 75.5% Christian, a small Hindu minority, with the rest stating no religion. The ethnic distribution was 97.8% White with a small Mixed Ethnic and British Asian minority. There were 198 dwellings.

== Community ==
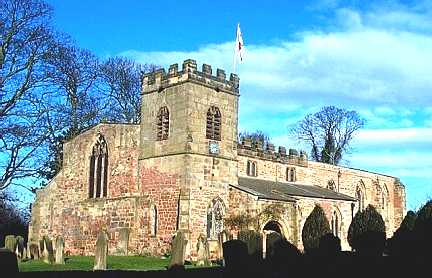
Croft on Tees, St Peter's Church

The village is served for Primary education by Croft CE Primary School which caters for ages 3 to 11 and has a capacity of 105. It lies within the catchment areas of both Northallerton School and Richmond School for secondary education.

Croft has two hotels, of which, Croft Hotel is a Grade II listed building. Croft motor racing circuit is built on the former aerodrome, RAF Croft.

== Religion ==
The village church, St Peter's, is a 14th-century style building situated on the bank of the Tees. It is a Grade I listed building.

Whilst not a job in Yorkshire, the incoming Bishop of Durham meets the Mayor of Darlington to be presented with the falchion that John Conyers used to despatch the Sockburn Worm. The ceremony, which is performed on the bridge over the River Tees in the village, has been carried out since 1790.

== Notable residents ==
Lewis Carroll lived in Croft from 1843 to 1850. His father the Revd Charles Dodgson was Rector of Croft and Archdeacon of Richmond from 1843 to 1868. Carroll's photo of the niece of Alfred Lord Tennyson's wife was taken at Croft. Historians believe Lewis Carroll's Cheshire Cat in the book Alice in Wonderland was inspired by a carving in Croft Church.

== See also ==
- Listed buildings in Croft-on-Tees
