= All Saints' Church, Girsby =

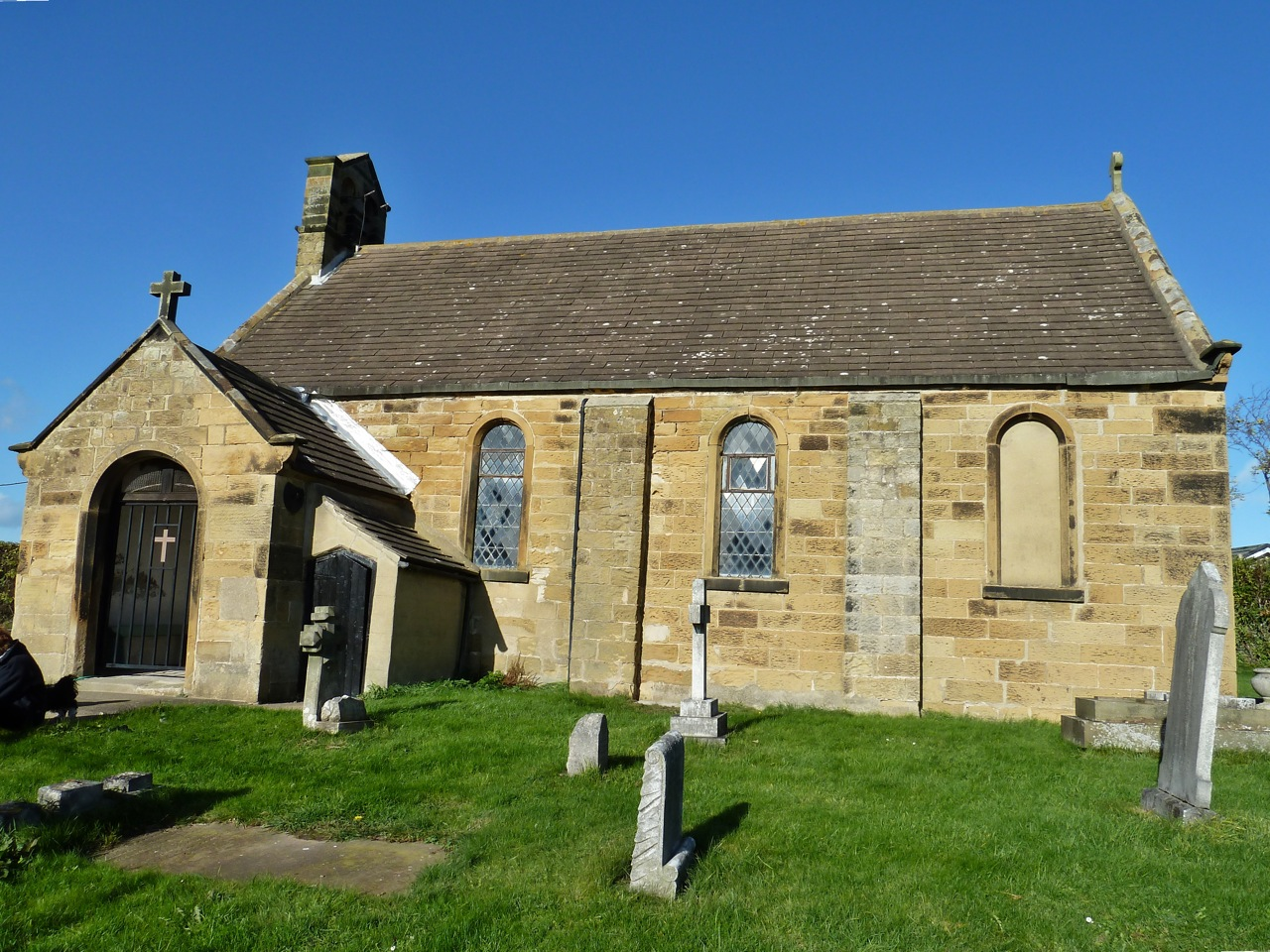
- The church, in 2010

- Location within North Yorkshire
- 54°28′09″N 1°27′20″W
- OS grid reference: NZ 35393 08329
- Website: www.achurchnearyou.com/church/13608/

All Saints' Church is an Anglican church in Girsby, a village in North Yorkshire, in England.

In the mediaeval period, the village of Girsby was served by All Saints' Church, Sockburn on the opposite side of the River Tees. It was abandoned in 1838, when a new church was built in the village. The Victoria County History describes the Victorian church as "an uninteresting building", while the National Churches Trust calls it a "simple country church". It was grade II listed in 1988.

The church is built of sandstone with a concrete tile roof. It consists of a nave and a chancel in one unit, and a south porch. On the west gable is a gabled bellcote with two round-arched openings. The porch is gabled, and contains a round-arched entrance with a chamfered surround, and the windows in the church have round-arched heads. The inside is plastered and plain, with a wall monument dating from 1788.

== See also ==
- Listed buildings in Girsby
