= Hutton Conyers =

Village and civil parish in North Yorkshire, England

Coordinates: 54.15494°N 1.501°W

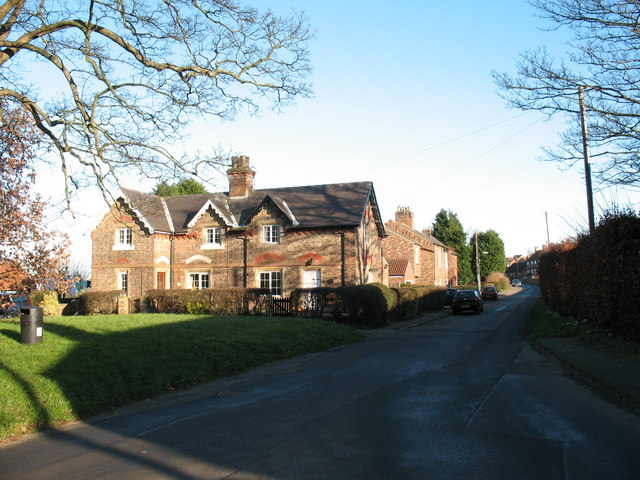
- Hutton Conyers village

- Location within North Yorkshire
- Population: 213 (2011)
- OS grid reference: SE326867
- Unitary authority: North Yorkshire
- Ceremonial county: North Yorkshire
- Region: Yorkshire and the Humber
- Country: England
- Sovereign state: United Kingdom
- Post town: RIPON
- Postcode district: HG4
- Police: North Yorkshire
- Fire: North Yorkshire
- Ambulance: Yorkshire
- UK Parliament: Skipton and Ripon (UK Parliament constituency)

Hutton Conyers is a village and civil parish in the county of North Yorkshire, England. It is situated near the River Ure and 1-mile (1.6 km) north-east of Ripon. The parish extends from the River Ure to the A1(M) motorway, and includes the village of Nunwick.

== History ==
The village is mentioned in the Domesday Book as Hotone in the Hallikeld hundred and was owned by Bishop of Durham St Cuthbert. Land ownership subsequently passed to the Conyers family, after whom the village derives its suffix. Thereafter it has passed through several notable local families, namely the Mallorys of Studley, the Aislabies, the Earl de Grey and thence to the Marquess of Ripon in the late 19th century. Hutton Conyers was historically an extra-parochial area in the North Riding of Yorkshire. It became a civil parish in 1858, from 1894 part of Wath Rural District. In 1974 it was transferred to the new county of North Yorkshire. In 1988 the parish absorbed the small civil parish of Nunwick cum Howgrave. From 1974 to 2023 it was part of the Borough of Harrogate, it is now administered by the unitary North Yorkshire Council.

The toponym derives from the Old English hōh tūn, meaning settlement on or by the hill spur. The second part of the name derives from the Conyers family, who held land here in the 12th century.

Just outside the village, Roman remains of a watchtower have been found, articles from which now reside in the Museum in Ripon.

The Leeds and Stockton branch of the North Eastern Railway used to pass through the village.

Hutton Conyers is known for being the last village in England to have a steam-powered post office, closing in 2009.

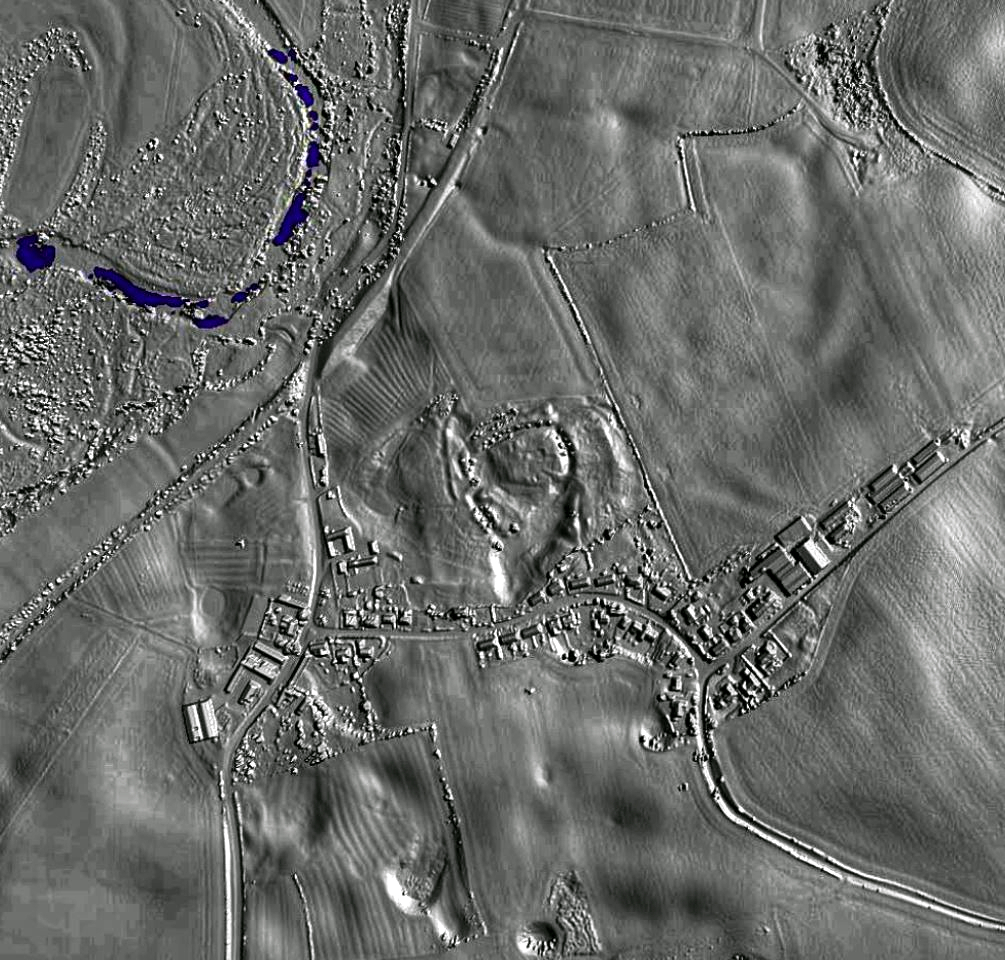
A lidar view of Hutton Conyers and associated archaeological features

== Governance ==
The village lies within the Skipton and Ripon UK Parliament constituency. It also lies within the Masham and Fountains electoral division of North Yorkshire County Council and the Wathvale ward of Harrogate District Borough Council.

== Geography ==
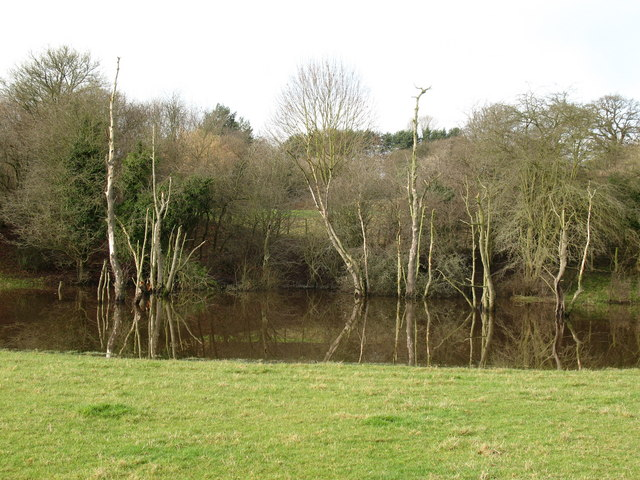
Pond formed in gypsum depression near village

The nearest settlements to the village are Ripon 1.4 miles (2.3 km) to the south-west; Sharow 0.9 miles (1.4 km) to the south-east and Melmerby, Harrogate 2.4 miles (3.9 km) to the north.

The 2001 UK Census recorded the population of the civil parish as 203, of which 150 were over sixteen years of age, a 104 of those were in employment. There were 77 dwellings of which 36 were detached. At the 2011 census the population was given as 213.

The area around Hutton Conyers has sizeable underground gypsum deposits which are prone to sudden collapse creating depressions to the west of the village.

== See also ==
- Listed buildings in Hutton Conyers
