= Conyers baronets =

English baronetcy

- Escutcheon of the Conyers baronets of Horden
- Creation date: 1628
- Status: extinct
- Extinction date: 1810
- Seat: Horden Hall
- Arms: azure, a maunch or

The baronetcy of Conyers of Horden was created in the Baronetage of England on 14 July 1628 for John Conyers of Horden, County Durham.

== Early history ==
Between 1099 and 1133 the then Bishop of Durham, Ralph Flambard, granted lands at Sockburn, in County Durham and Hutton, in the North Riding of Yorkshire, to a Roger de Conyers. By the end of the 12th century the lands were divided between two branches of the Conyers family. The elder branch resided at Hutton Conyers, which passed to the Mallory family in 1347 after a Conyers daughter married a Mallory. The other branch was well established at Sockburn. Sockburn Hall was the family seat. The last male Conyers at Sockburn died in 1635, and his granddaughter sold the manor of Sockburn.

=== Horden Hall ===
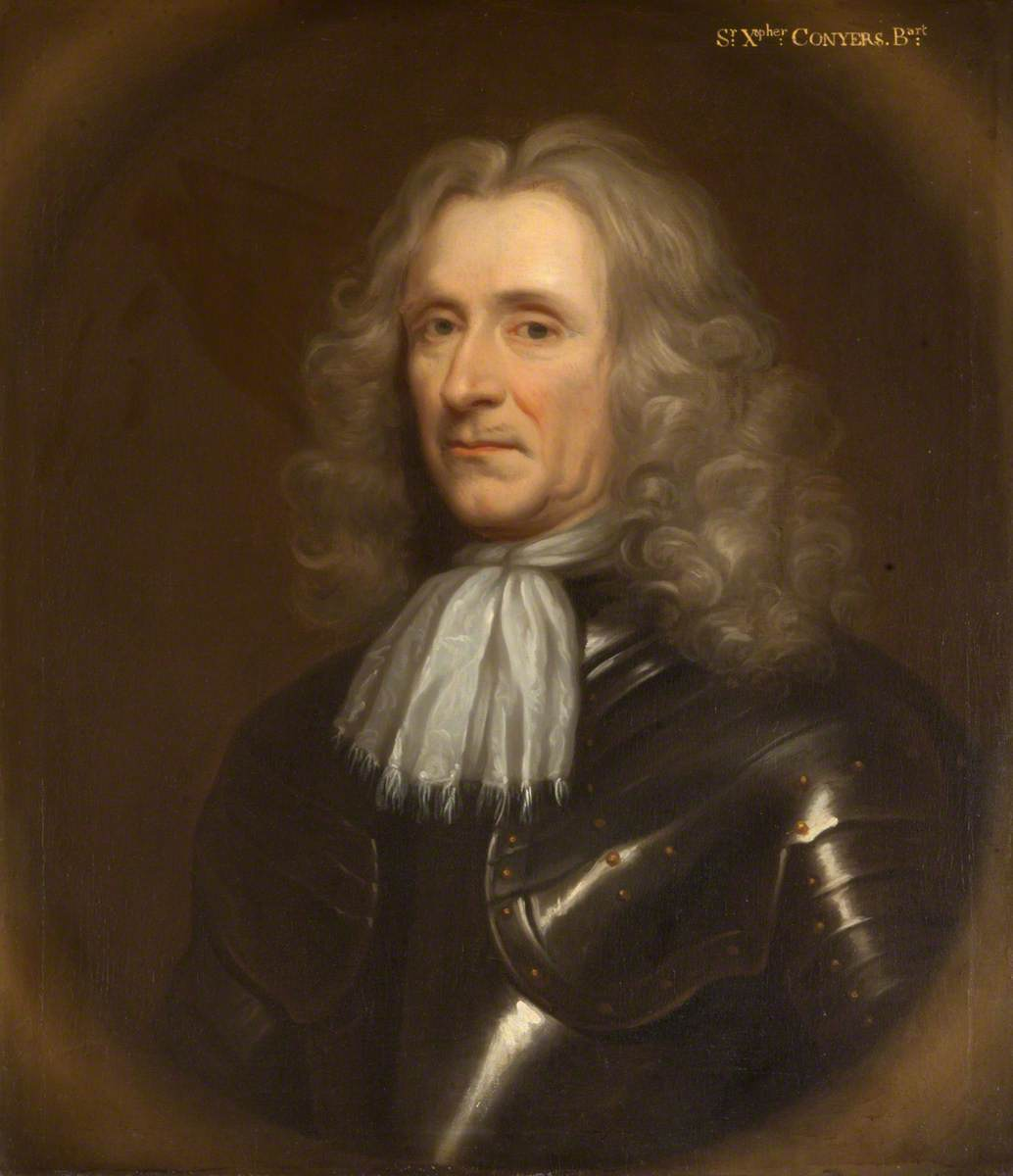
Sir Christopher Conyers, 2nd Baronet of Horden Hall

In the 15th century Richard Conyers of Hornby, a descendant of Christopher Conyers of Hornby, married the heiress of the Horden estate near Peterlee, County Durham, and Horden Hall became the family seat. In 1810, Horden Hall estate consisted of around 500 acres.

The 2nd Baronet, Sir Christopher Conyers married Elizabeth Langhorne, heiress to an estate at Charlton, Kent. His second wife was Julia, daughter of Richard Lumley, 1st Viscount Lumley. The son of Sir Christopher and his wife Elizabeth – the 3rd Baronet – inherited that estate in 1714. The 3rd Baronet had, however, married the Baldwin heiress whose family had an estate at Great Stoughton, Huntingdonshire. Thus, in 1675 the Baronet moved the family seat there.

Sir Baldwin Conyers, 4th Baronet died without a male heir and the Horden estate was sold. The Charlton estate passed by entail out of the immediate family. The baronetcy passed to his cousin, Ralph Conyers of Chester le Street, who was a great-grandson of the first Baronet. He married Jane Blakiston (d.1774) on 11 June 1719 at Durham Cathedral – Jane being a scion of the "opulent House of Gibside", near Rowlands Gill. This alliance of the family with the Gibside-Bowes further "elevated their position and grandeur". The sons of Sir Ralph and Lady Conyers succeeded as the 6th and 7th Baronets, their grandson George as the 8th Baronet who upon his death, left the baronetcy to be inherited by Thomas, their third son; Sir Thomas was the 9th and last Baronet.

== Sir Thomas Conyers, 9th Baronet ==
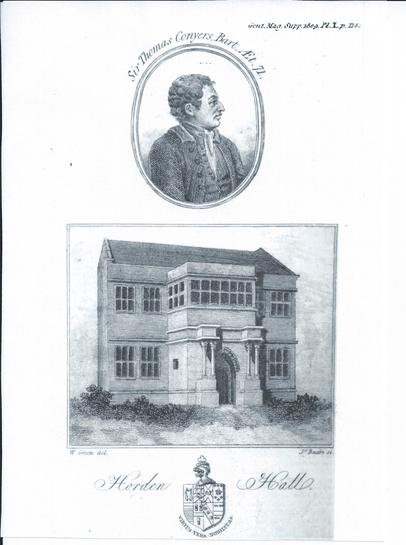
Sir Thomas Conyers, 9th Baronet (died 1810)

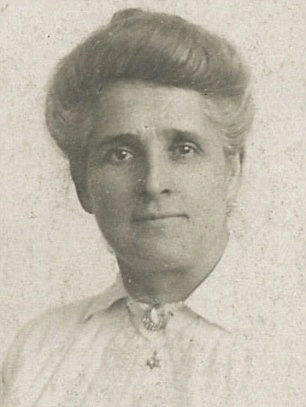
Sir Thomas's great-great-granddaughter – Jane Harrison (née Liddle) – great-grandmother of Dorothy Goldsmith (née Harrison), mother of Carole Middleton

Sir Thomas, the 9th Baronet, seems to have retained his bearing as a gentleman; he is described as "gentleman" at his marriage in 1754 and as "esquire" in the baptismal entries of his daughters. According to Burke's Vicissitudes of Families, Durham historian Robert Surtees called on him at a Durham workhouse and, distressed at his plight, offered to raise an appeal to alleviate his circumstances. Sir Thomas replied: "I am no beggar, Sir; I won't accept any such offers." His pride extended to the rejection of financial aid from his family. Although on 10 May 1800, he had attended Westminster Abbey for the funeral of his Gibside heiress cousin, Mary Eleanor Bowes – acknowledged as the wealthiest woman in England – he accepted no aid from his relatives at Gibside, the coal-rich estate in the Derwent Valley, County Durham, that his ancestor, Sir William Blakiston had owned.

Robert Surtees wrote in February 1810 that although Sir Thomas Conyers had a number of "patrons" who helped him financially, it was only from his relative, "the late George Lumley-Saunderson, 5th Earl of Scarbrough", that the baronet experienced "kindness" during his final years of hardship. Surtees was modestly successful in his appeal for funds and Sir Thomas, "now in his 72nd year", was moved to more comfortable accommodation in a private house on 1 March 1810.

The fate of Sir Thomas' brother was, according to the 1809 Gentleman's Magazine, somewhat better; Sir Blakiston Conyers (d.1791), was the "heir of two ancient titles, from which he derived little more than his name". But whereas the acceptance of the "generous patronage" of his Gibside relatives, the Bowes-Lyon family, had ensured that Sir Blakiston's situation was considerably more comfortable, his brother, Sir Thomas, died a pauper on 15 April 1810, only months after having been rescued from the workhouse by his gentry friends.

Sir Thomas Blakiston Conyers, the great-great-grandson of the first Baronet Conyers, failed to sire a surviving male heir and had only three daughters : Jane, Elizabeth and Dorothy.

Sir Bernard Burke, in his 1861 work "Vicissitudes of Families", presents a chapter entitled "The Fall of Conyers" which concludes with the following: "Magni stat nominis umbra! The poor Baronet left three daughters, married in very humble life: Jane, to William Hardy; Elizabeth, to Joseph Hutchinson; and Dorothy, to Joseph Barker, all working men in the little town of Chester-le-Street. A time may yet come, perchance, when a descendant of one of these simple artizans may arise, not unworthy of the Conyers' ancient renown; and it will be a gratifying discovery to some future genealogist, when he succeeds in tracing in the quarterings of such a descendant the unsullied bearing of Conyers of Durham."

The baronetcy of Conyers of Horden became extinct in 1810. Sir Thomas's great-great-granddaughter, Jane Harrison (née Liddle; c.1839–1881) is the great-grandmother of Dorothy Goldsmith (née Harrison; 1935–2006), mother of Carole Middleton.

== Conyers of Horden (1628) ==
- Sir John Conyers, 1st Baronet (died 1664)
- Sir Christopher Conyers, 2nd Baronet (1621–1693)
- Sir John Conyers, 3rd Baronet (1649–1719)
- Sir Baldwin Conyers, 4th Baronet (1681–1731)
- Sir Ralph Conyers, 5th Baronet (1697–1767)
- Sir Blakiston Conyers, 6th Baronet (died 1791)
- Sir Nicholas Conyers, 7th Baronet (1729–1796)
- Sir George Conyers, 8th Baronet (died c. 1800)
- Sir Thomas Conyers, 9th Baronet (1731–1810)
