= History of local government districts in Durham =

Districts created since 1853 in the county of Durham, England

They had been successive district administration in the County of Durham. The ancient county was formerly structured around the Bishop of Durham with ancient wards and boroughs.

== 1835–1974 ==
The county palatine was restructured to a standard county system of the time through successive Durham County Palatine Acts 1836 to 1889. Municipal boroughs were established under the Municipal Corporations Act 1835. The administrative county and county boroughs were introduced in 1889 by the Local Government Act 1888. Urban and rural districts were created under the Local Government Act 1894 (56 & 57 Vict. c. 73). The structure was replaced under the Local Government Act 1972 in 1974.

=== Boroughs ===
A borough could either have or not have a rural controlled from the same set of municipal buildings. A municipal borough’s area was part-governed by the administrative county; a municipal borough could become a county borough which was only ceremonially linked with the county.

| Borough | Type | From | Until | Notes |
|---|---|---|---|---|
| Darlington | Municipal | 1867 | 1915 | |
| Darlington | County | 1915 | 1974 | Replaced by the Borough of Darlington |
| Durham | Municipal | 1835 | 1974 | Replaced by City of Durham, since 2009 the Unitary Authority of County Durham |
| Gateshead | Municipal | 1835 | 1888 | |
| Gateshead | County | 1888 | 1974 | Replaced by the Metropolitan Borough of Gateshead |
| West Hartlepool | Municipal | 1887 | 1902 | |
| West Hartlepool | County | 1902 | 1967 | Boroughs merged |
| Hartlepool | Municipal | 1850 | 1967 | Boroughs merged |
| Hartlepool | County | 1967 | 1974 | Replaced by the Borough of Hartlepool |
| Jarrow | Municipal | 1875 | 1974 | Replaced by the Borough of South Tyneside |
| South Shields | Municipal | 1850 | 1889 | |
| South Shields | County | 1889 | 1974 | Replaced by the Borough of South Tyneside |
| Stockton-on-Tees | Municipal | 1835 | 1968 | Merged into the County Borough of Teesside |
| Sunderland | Municipal | 1835 | 1888 | |
| Sunderland | County | 1888 | 1974 | replaced by the Borough of Sunderland |

=== Districts ===
A rural and or urban district could be controlled from a single set of municipal buildings:

| District | Type | From | Until |
|---|---|---|---|
| Annfield Plain | Urban | 1896 | 1937 |
| Auckland | Rural | 1894 | 1937 |
| Barnard Castle | Rural | 1894 | 1974 |
| Barnard Castle | Urban | 1894 | 1974 |
| Benfieldside | Urban | 1894 | 1937 |
| Billingham | Urban | 1923 | 1968 |
| Bishop Auckland | Urban | 1894 | 1974 |
| Blaydon | Urban | 1894 | 1974 |
| Boldon | Urban | 1936 | 1974 |
| Brandon and Byshottles | Urban | 1894 | 1974 |
| Chester-le-Street | Rural | 1894 | 1974 |
| Chester-le-Street | Urban | 1909 | 1974 |
| Consett | Urban | 1894 | 1974 |
| Crook | Urban | 1898 | 1937 |
| Crook and Willington | Urban | 1937 | 1974 |
| Darlington | Rural | 1894 | 1974 |
| Durham | Rural | 1894 | 1974 |
| Easington | Rural | 1894 | 1974 |
| Felling | Urban | 1894 | 1974 |
| Hartlepool | Rural | 1894 | 1937 |
| Hebburn | Urban | 1894 | 1974 |
| Hetton | Urban | 1895 | 1974 |
| Houghton-le-Spring | Rural | 1894 | 1937 |
| Houghton-le-Spring | Urban | 1894 | 1974 |
| Lanchester | Rural | 1894 | 1974 |
| Leadgate | Urban | 1894 | 1937 |
| Ryton | Urban | 1894 | 1974 |
| Seaham | Urban | 1937 | 1974 |
| Seaham Harbour | Urban | 1894 | 1937 |
| Sedgefield | Rural | 1894 | 1974 |
| Shildon | Urban | 1894 | 1974 |
| South Shields | Rural | 1894 | 1936 |
| Southwick on Wear | Urban | 1894 | 1928 |
| Spennymoor | Urban | 1894 | 1974 |
| Stanhope | Urban | 1894 | 1937 |
| Stanley | Urban | 1894 | 1974 |
| Stockton | Rural | 1894 | 1974 |
| Sunderland | Rural | 1894 | 1967 |
| Tanfield | Urban | 1895 | 1937 |
| Tow Law | Urban | 1894 | 1974 |
| Washington | Urban | 1922 | 1974 |
| Weardale | Rural | 1894 | 1974 |
| Whickham | Urban | 1894 | 1974 |
| Willington | Urban | 1894 | 1937 |

== 1974-2009 ==
Local government districts in Durham ceremonial county

Map of districts 1974-2009

Map of districts from 2009

Under the Local Government Act 1972, the county's ceremonial, district and borough boundaries were moved to align to the newly created non-metropolitan county of Durham. The ceremonial county had the boroughs Darlington (borough) of Sedgefield and the City of Durham as well as five districts:

- Chester-le-Street
- Derwentside
- Easington
- Teesdale
- Wear Valley.

unitary authority under the Local Government Act 1992. Darlington borough became a unitary authority in 1995. The county of Cleveland disbanded in 1996, Boroughs of Hartlepool and of Stockton-on-Tees became unitary authorities in the ceremonial county. The Borough of Stockton-on Tees is split between the ceremonial counties of Durham and North Yorkshire.

The non-metropolitan county was subject to 2009 reforms. The council county, districts and boroughs were merged into a unitary authority. The ceremonial county now covers four unitary authorities:

- Borough of Darlington
- County of Durham
- Borough of Hartlepool
- Borough of Stockton-on-Tees (north of the River Tees)
