= Durham City Council =

Durham City Council may refer to:

- The local government of Durham, England, called the "City of Durham Parish Council" since 2018)
  - Durham (non-metropolitan district), from 1974 to 2009
  - Durham and Framwelgate, before 1974
- The local government of Durham, North Carolina, U.S.; see Durham, North Carolina#Government
