= List of cities in the United Kingdom =

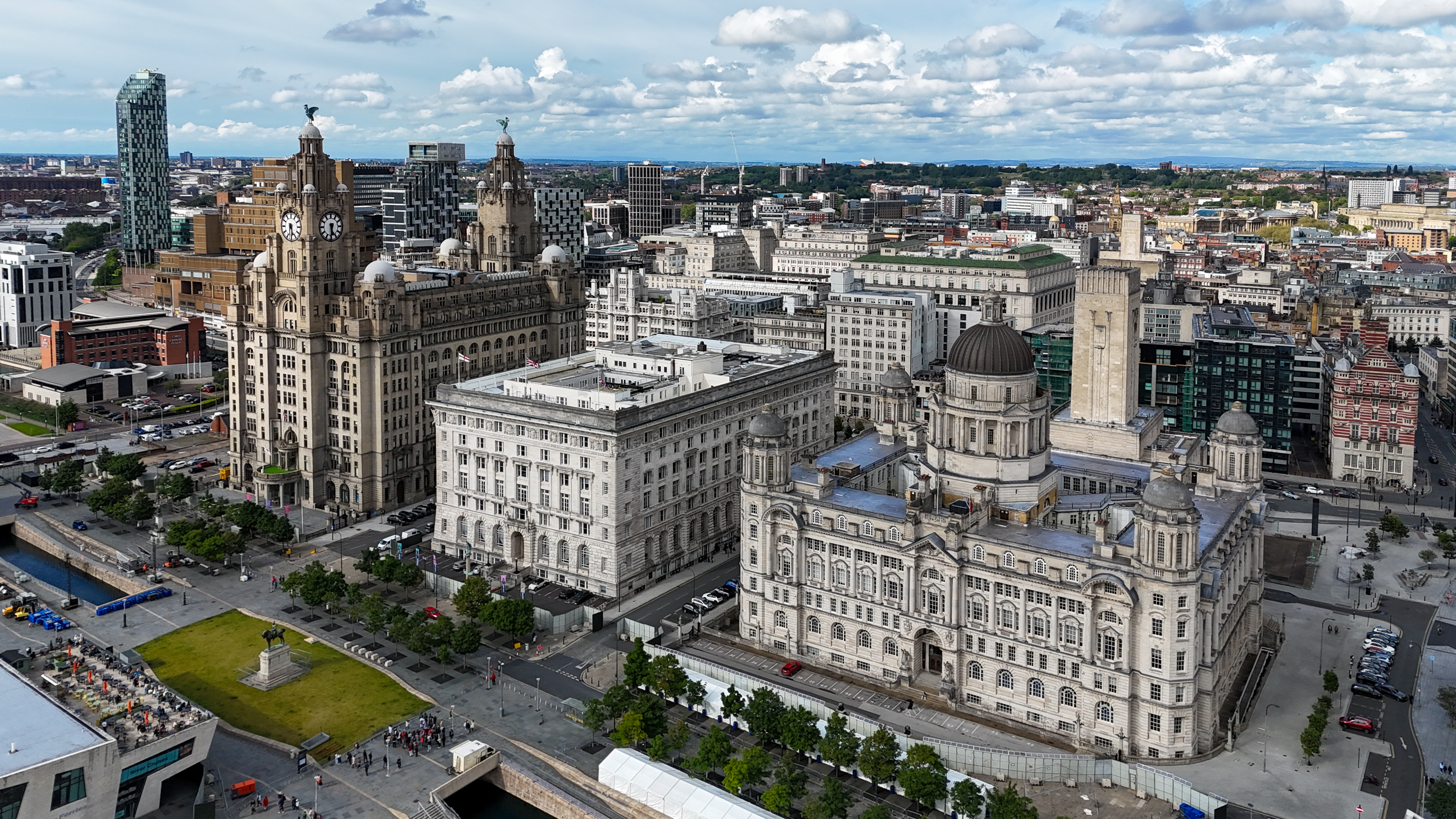
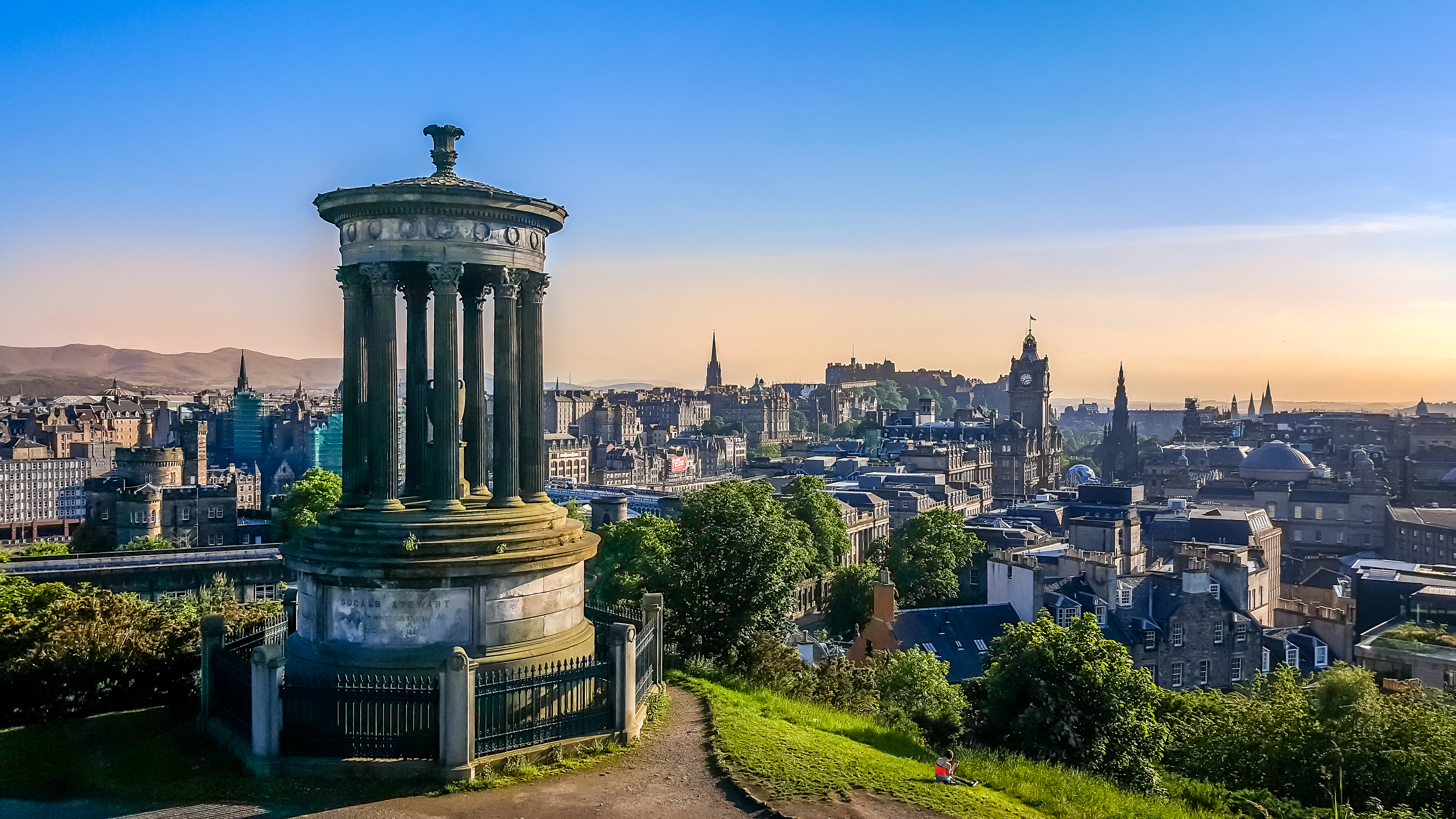
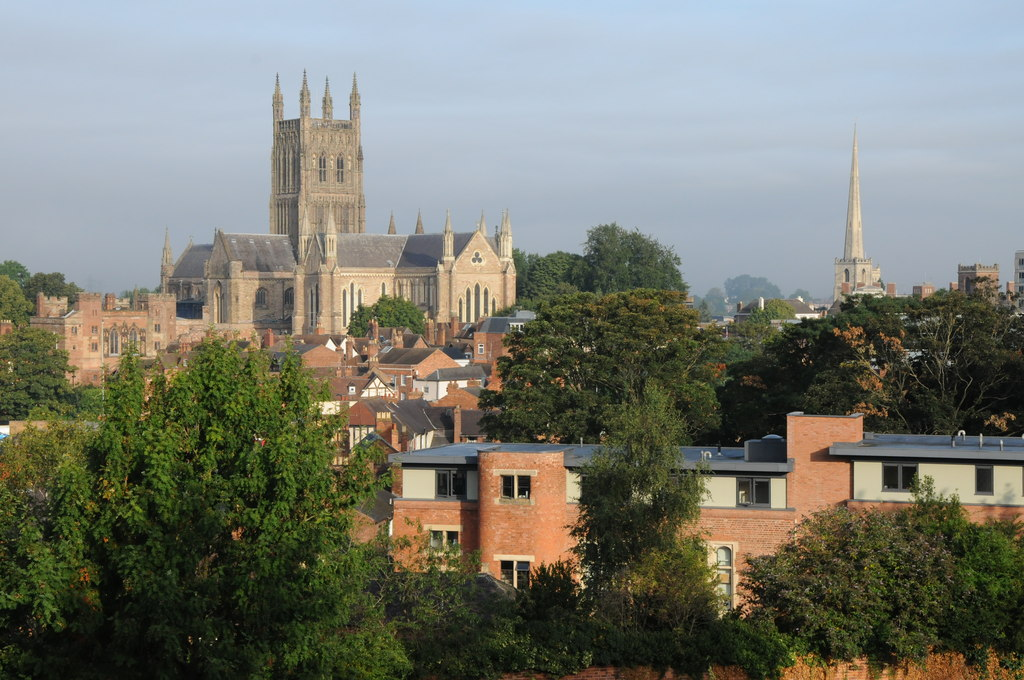
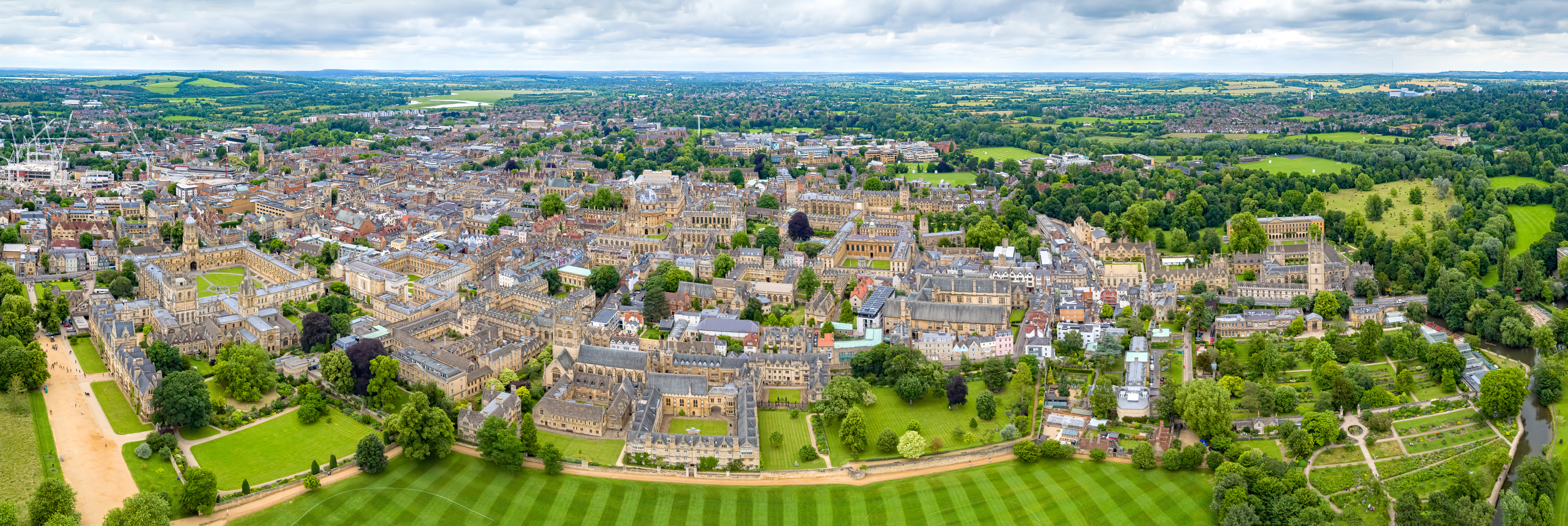
Examples of cities in the United Kingdom: Liverpool, Edinburgh, Worcester, and Oxford

This is a list of cities in the United Kingdom that are officially designated as such as of 29 August 2022. It lists those places that have been granted city status by letters patent or royal charter.

There are currently 76 such cities in the United Kingdom: 55 in England, eight in Scotland, seven in Wales, and six in Northern Ireland. Of these, 24 in England, two in Wales, and two in Northern Ireland have Lord Mayors; four in Scotland have Lord Provosts. (Note: See List of lord mayoralties and lord provostships in the United Kingdom.) In some cases, the area holding city status does not coincide with the built up area or conurbation of which it forms part. In Greater London, for example, the Cities of London and Westminster hold city status separately, but no other local authority in the London Region has been granted city status, nor has the Greater London Authority.

In other cases, such as the cities of Canterbury and Lancaster, the status applies to a local government district which extends over a number of towns and rural areas outside the main settlement proper. In England, city status sometimes applies to civil parishes, such as with Ripon; though the status may not apply to the local government district which share their name. For example, the civil parishes of Lichfield and Chichester each hold city status, but Lichfield District and Chichester District in which they are situated do not.

As of 2022, there are currently five ceremonial counties which contain three cities – Cambridgeshire (Ely, Cambridge and Peterborough (Note: Peterborough was in Northamptonshire from the Middle Ages until 1974.)), Essex, Hampshire, West Midlands and West Yorkshire. Outside the UK within British overseas cities of the British Overseas Territories and Crown Dependencies, there are currently five. The number increased as part of the Platinum Jubilee celebrations by the addition of Stanley in the Falkland Islands and Douglas in the Isle of Man.

== History ==
The earliest cities (Latin: civitas) in Britain were the fortified settlements organised by the Romans as capitals of the Celtic tribes under Roman rule. The British clerics of the early Middle Ages later preserved a traditional list of the "28 Cities" (Old Welsh: cair) which was mentioned in De Excidio Britanniae (Note: De Excidio Britanniae, §3. (in Latin) Cited in the "Civitas" entry of Celtic Culture.) and Historia Brittonum.

The title of city was initially informal and, into the 20th century, royal charters were considered to recognise city status rather than grant it. (Note: The 11th edition of the Encyclopædia Britannica, for instance, listed St Asaph and Southwell as cities on the basis of their cathedrals despite their lack of charters or, in Southwell's case, local government.) The usual criterion in early modern Britain was the presence of a cathedral, particularly after King Henry VIII granted letters patent establishing six new cities when he established a series of new dioceses of the Church of England in the 1540s as part of the English Reformation. No new cities were created between the 16th and 19th centuries, but following the Industrial Revolution and the accompanying population boom and growth in urbanisation, new sees were established at Ripon (1836) and Manchester (1847); their councils began to style them cities immediately. Inverness in Scotland was refused a charter at the time of the Diamond Jubilee of Queen Victoria honours of 1897, in part because it would have drawn more attention to the other traditional "cities" still not formally chartered as such.

Beginning in the mid-19th century, however, the process became more formal. After a visit by Queen Victoria in 1851, Manchester petitioned Parliament for recognition of its status. Ripon followed in the 1860s, and a series of hitherto informal "cities" were formally recognised in the 1880s and 1890s. On the basis of its size, importance, and regular government, Belfast was elevated in spite of its lack of a cathedral in 1888; other large municipalities followed, while smaller applicants began to be rejected. King Edward VII and the Home Office established three criteria for future applicants in 1907: a minimum population of 300,000, a good record of local government, and a "local metropolitan character". These criteria were not made public, however, and following Leicester's successful elevation in 1919, a series of exceptions were made. The Local Government Act 1972 effectively eliminated all authorities holding city status outside Greater London on 1 April 1974; most of their replacements were confirmed in their predecessor's status – even in cases such as the 1974–2023 Carlisle district, where much of the local authority area was undeveloped countryside – but the Borough of Medway was not permitted to continue Rochester's title. In recent times there have been competitions for new grants of city status. Towns or councils that claim city status or add "city" to their name have been rebuked by the Advertising Standards Authority.

The cities of the Kingdom of Scotland and Kingdom of Ireland were treated separately. Scottish towns irregularly applied the description to themselves, but were formally organised as royal burghs; the special rights of these were preserved by Article XXI of the Treaty of Union which established the single state of the Kingdom of Great Britain in 1707. Edinburgh and Glasgow were confirmed as cities "by ancient usage" in the 18th century, as was Aberdeen, and this was later reconfirmed in the Act enlarging the burgh in 1891. Dundee was granted letters patent in 1889 and Elgin and Perth were recognised as cities by the Home Office in 1972, before the privilege was removed by the Scottish Local Government Act of 1973. In Northern Ireland, only the seat of the Primate of All Ireland at Armagh was accorded city status by ancient usage, and this status was abolished by the Municipal Corporations (Ireland) Act 1840. All other cities have been those explicitly recognised as such.

Thirty-two cities have a Lord Provost (in Scotland) or a Lord Mayor (in England, Wales, and Northern Ireland), see List of lord mayoralties and lord provostships in the United Kingdom. The six cities where the Lord Mayor or Lord Provost has the right to the style The Right Honourable are York, the City of London, Edinburgh, Glasgow (since 1912), Belfast (since 1923), and Cardiff (since 1956).

== Statistical role ==
City status has little statistical significance in the UK because it is not a measure of a city's size and only holds a ceremonial status. Historic cities, such as St Davids (a cathedral city in Wales) can be quite small, but newer cities, such as those conferred in 2022, can range in size from 50,000 to more than 200,000. Populous towns, such as Luton, Northampton and Reading, do not have city status.

=== Conurbations ===
The term "city" is sometimes loosely applied to conurbations in the UK. The government tends to recognise these as primary urban areas for statistical and economic purposes, though greater urban areas are what most people determine to be a city region. Large cities other than London, such as Manchester or Birmingham, are often confused with these conurbations. Manchester has a significantly lower population than Birmingham, though the Greater Manchester Built-up Area is more populous than the West Midlands conurbation. This question of definition has provoked a second city debate in the United Kingdom.

Conversely, many official cities in the UK contain a substantial rural area encompassing settlements which are physically separated from the core urban area. The City of Milton Keynes (a unitary authority) and City of Colchester (non-metropolitan district) received letters patent which covered an area substantially larger than that of their respective core urban areas; this meant that extra-urban settlements such as the towns of Olney and West Mersea fall within de jure cities.

== List of cities ==
De facto (Note: De facto - named city settlement.)			De jure (Note: De jure - entity with city status.)		
City	Statistical region	Year granted or confirmed	City	City council status	Population
London (England)	London	"time immemorial" (Note: Meaning before 1189, the official start of English common law.)	City of London (Note: The City of London covers only the "square mile", and is usually just referred to as "the City". The larger conurbation of Greater London has no city charter, and consists of the City of London, the City of Westminster and 31 other London boroughs.)	Sui generis and ceremonial county	12,156 (2023)
Westminster (England)	London	1540	City of Westminster (Note: The title of City was used "by courtesy" after 1550 when Westminster ceased to be the see of a bishop. By Letters Patent dated 27 October 1900 city status was conferred on the newly created Metropolitan Borough of Westminster from 1 November. This status was continued on the creation of the City of Westminster as a London borough in 1965.)	London borough	213,119 (2023)
Birmingham (England)	West Midlands	1889	City of Birmingham (Note: City status confirmed by Letters Patent issued under the Great Seal dated 25 June 1974.)	Metropolitan borough	1,171,467 (2023)
Leeds (England)	Yorkshire and the Humber	1893	City of Leeds (Note: City status confirmed by Letters Patent issued under the Great Seal dated 1 April 1974.)	Metropolitan borough	829,417 (2023)
Glasgow (Scotland) (Scots: Glesga) (Scottish Gaelic: Glaschu)	Scotland	mid-18th century (Burgh: 1492)	City of Glasgow	Council area (Note: Present Unitary Council Areas which incorporate majority areas from the 4 cities that existed prior to the introduction of the Local Government etc. (Scotland) Act 1994 are declared "cities" by that same act, which also reserves the post of Lord Provost for the convener of the four councils.)	631,970 (2023)
Manchester (England)	North West England	1853	City of Manchester	Metropolitan borough	627,000 (2023)
Sheffield (England)	Yorkshire and the Humber	1893	City of Sheffield (Note: City status confirmed by Letters Patent issued under the Great Seal dated 28 May 1974.)	Metropolitan borough	579,082 (2023)
Bradford (England)	Yorkshire and the Humber	1897	City of Bradford	Metropolitan borough	556,880 (2023)
Edinburgh (Scotland) (Scottish Gaelic: Dùn Èideann)	Scotland	mid-18th century (Burgh: 1329)	City of Edinburgh	Council area	523,250 (2023)
Liverpool (England)	North West England	1880	City of Liverpool	Metropolitan borough	504,932 (2023)
Bristol (England)	South West England	1542	City of Bristol	Unitary authority and ceremonial county	482,815 (2023)
Cardiff (Wales) (Note: Letters Patent under the Great Seal were issued on 29 March 1996 ordaining that the counties of Swansea and Cardiff should have the status of cities from 1 April 1996. The counties replaced the previous district councils which had enjoyed city status.) (Welsh: Caerdydd)	Wales	1905 (Note: The Letters Patent also granted the title of Lord Mayor.)	Cardiff	Principal area	381,759 (2023)
Leicester (England)	East Midlands	1919 (Note: A letter from the Home Secretary to the Mayor of Leicester dated 14 June 1919, confirming that the city status would be bestowed, noted that this was a "restoration to your ancient town of its former status of a city".)	City of Leicester	Unitary authority	379,963 (2023)
Coventry (England)	West Midlands	1102 ("time immemorial")	City of Coventry	Metropolitan borough	368,483 (2023)
Wakefield (England)	Yorkshire and the Humber	1888	City of Wakefield	Metropolitan borough	362,355 (2023)
Belfast (Irish: Béal Feirste) (Ulster-Scots dialect: Bilfawst)	Northern Ireland	1888	Belfast		345,418 (2021)
Nottingham (England)	East Midlands	1897	City of Nottingham	Unitary authority	330,949 (2023)
Newcastle upon Tyne (England)	North East England	1882	City of Newcastle upon Tyne	Metropolitan borough	315,110 (2023)
Doncaster (England)	Yorkshire and the Humber	2022	City of Doncaster	Metropolitan borough	314,252 (2023)
Milton Keynes (England)	South East England	2022	City of Milton Keynes	Unitary authority	297,180 (2023)
Salford (England)	North West England	1926	City of Salford	Metropolitan borough	282,487 (2023)
Sunderland (England)	North East England	1992	City of Sunderland	Metropolitan borough	279,556 (2023)
Brighton and Hove (England)	South East England	2001	Brighton and Hove	Unitary authority	278,455 (2023)
Wolverhampton (England)	West Midlands	2001	City of Wolverhampton	Metropolitan borough	271,173 (2023)
Kingston upon Hull (England)	Yorkshire and the Humber	1897	City of Kingston upon Hull (Note: City Status confirmed by Letters Patent issued under the Great Seal dated 18 March 1975.)	Unitary authority	271,095 (2023)
Plymouth (England)	South West England	1928	City of Plymouth	Unitary authority	267,888 (2023)
Derby (England)	East Midlands	1977	City of Derby	Unitary authority	265,082 (2023)
Stoke-on-Trent (England)	West Midlands	1925	City of Stoke-on-Trent	Unitary authority	261,867 (2023)
Southampton (England)	South East England	1964	City of Southampton	Unitary authority	257,160 (2023)
Swansea (Wales) (Welsh: Abertawe)	Wales	1969	Swansea	Principal area	245,440 (2023)
Aberdeen (Scotland) (Scots: Aiberdeen) (Scottish Gaelic: Obar Dheathain)	Scotland	1891 (Note: Burghs of Old Aberdeen and Woodside and the district of Torry incorporated as the City and Royal Burgh of Aberdeen by the Aberdeen Corporation Act 1891 (54 & 55 Vict. c. cxxiv).) (Burgh: 1179)	City of Aberdeen	Council area	227,750 (2023)
Peterborough (England)	East of England	1541	City of Peterborough	Unitary authority	218,179 (2023)
Portsmouth (England)	South East England	1926^{24}	City of Portsmouth	Unitary authority	209,171 (2023)
York (England)	Yorkshire and the Humber	"time immemorial"	City of York (Note: Letters Patent under the Great Seal conferring City Status were issued to the unitary authority of York on 1 April 1996, confirming the right of the Lord Mayor to be styled "Right Honourable", in continuation to those granted to the previous City Council abolished 31 March 1996.)	Unitary authority	206,825 (2023)
Colchester (England)	East of England	2022	City of Colchester	Non-metropolitan borough	196,808 (2023)
Chelmsford (England)	East of England	2012	City of Chelmsford (Note: Letters Patent dated 1 June 2012 "to ordain that the Town of Chelmsford in the County of Essex and the Town of St Asaph in the County of Denbighshire shall have the status of a City".)	Non-metropolitan borough	185,288 (2023)
Southend-on-Sea (England)	East of England	2022	City of Southend-on-Sea	Unitary authority	182,278 (2023)
Oxford (England)	South East England	1542	City of Oxford	Non-metropolitan borough	165,257 (2023)
Newport (Wales) (Welsh: Casnewydd)	Wales	2002	Newport	Principal area	163,547 (2023)
Canterbury (England)	South East England	"time immemorial"	City of Canterbury	Non-metropolitan borough	160,351 (2023)
Preston (England)	North West England	2002	City of Preston	Non-metropolitan borough	155,634 (2023)
Dundee (Scotland) (Scottish Gaelic: Dùn Dèagh)	Scotland	1889 (Note: Warrant issued 28 January 1889 that Letters Patent be issued under the Seal appointed by the treaty of union to be used in place of the Great Seal of Scotland, ordaining and declaring that the Burgh of Dundee shall be a City, and shall be called and styled "The City of Dundee".) (Burgh: 1191)	City of Dundee	Council area	150,390 (2023)
Cambridge (England)	East of England	1951	City of Cambridge	Non-metropolitan borough	147,797 (2023)
St Albans (England)	East of England	1877	St Albans City and District (Note: City status was confirmed by Letters Patent dated 9 July 1974. The city status extends to the entire district, although the district council calls itself "St Albans District Council" or "St Albans City and District".)	Non-metropolitan borough	147,410 (2023)
Lancaster (England)	North West, England	1937	City of Lancaster	Non-metropolitan borough	145,346 (2023)
Norwich (England)	East of England	1094 ("time immemorial")	City of Norwich	Non-metropolitan borough	144,251 (2023)
Chester (England)	North West England	1541	(Cheshire West and Chester does not hold status)	Charter trustees (Note: The status of these cities changed on 1 April 2009 due to local government reforms. Salisbury became a civil parish, while charter trustees were formed for the former district council areas of Chester and Durham in the new unitary authorities of Cheshire West and Chester and County Durham respectively.)	138,873 (2021)
Exeter (England)	South West England	"time immemorial"	City of Exeter	Non-metropolitan borough	137,462 (2023)
Wrexham (Wales) (Welsh: Wrecsam)	Wales	2022	Wrexham County Borough	Principal area	137,341 (2023)
Gloucester (England)	South West, England	1541	City of Gloucester	Non-metropolitan borough	133,998 (2023)
Winchester (England)	South East, England	"time immemorial"	City of Winchester	Non-metropolitan borough	132,341 (2023)
Durham (England)	North East, England	"time immemorial"	(County Durham does not hold status)	Charter trustees	126,486 (2021)
Carlisle (England)	North West, England	1133 ("time immemorial")	(Cumberland does not hold status)	Charter trustees	110,024 (2021)
Worcester (England)	West Midlands	"time immemorial"	City of Worcester	Non-metropolitan borough	104,589 (2023)
Lincoln (England)	East Midlands	1072 ("time immemorial")	City of Lincoln	Non-metropolitan borough	102,392 (2023)
Bath (England)	South West, England	1090 ("time immemorial")	(Bath and North East Somerset does not hold status)	Charter trustees	95,043 (2021)
Derry (Note: Legally, the city and county are called "Londonderry", while the local government district is called "Derry". See Derry/Londonderry name dispute.) (Irish: Doire) (Ulster-Scots: Derrie)	Northern Ireland	1604	None	Represented on Derry City and Strabane District Council	85,279 (2021)
Dunfermline (Scotland); Scottish Gaelic: Dùn Phàrlain	Scotland	2022	Dunfermline	Part of Fife Council	76,210 (2020)
Bangor (Irish: Beannchar)	Northern Ireland	2022	None	Represented on Ards and North Down Borough Council	64,596 (2021)
Inverness (Scotland) (Scots: Inerness) (Scottish Gaelic: Inbhir Nis)	Scotland	2001	Inverness	Part of Highland Council	63,730 (2020)
Hereford (England)	West Midlands	"time immemorial"	Hereford parish (Note: City status was conferred on Hereford Town Council 11 October 2000.[76] The status had previously been confirmed to the district council formed in 1974. When that council was abolished in 1996 charter trustees were formed for the City of Hereford. On the formation of a town council for Hereford in April 2000 the charter trustees were dissolved, and the city status temporarily lapsed.)	Civil parish	53,113 (2021)
Lisburn (Irish: Lios na gCearrbhach)	Northern Ireland	2002	None	Represented on Lisburn and Castlereagh City Council	51,447 (2021)
Stirling (Scotland) (Scots: Stirlin) (Scottish Gaelic: Sruighlea)	Scotland	2002	Stirling	Part of Stirling Council	49,950 (2020)
Perth (Scotland) (Scots: Pairth) (Scottish Gaelic: Peairt)	Scotland	2012 (Burgh: 12th century) (Note: Created a royal burgh at some point under King David I (1124–53) although the earliest surviving charters date to 1209 or 1210; the status was abolished in 1975.)	Perth	Part of Perth and Kinross Council	47,350 (2020)
Salisbury (England)	South West England	1227	Salisbury parish (Note: Letters Patent 1 April 2009 City status had been held prior to this date and, since 1974, by the Charter Trustees of the City of New Sarum (The city of Salisbury's formal name was New Sarum cf. Old Sarum from 1227 until 2009))	Civil parish	41,552 (2021)
Lichfield (England)	West Midlands	"time immemorial"	Lichfield parish (Note: Letters Patent dated 4 November 1980. A town council had been constituted in 1980 leading to the dissolution of the Charter Trustees of the City of Lichfield.)	Civil parish	32,580 (2021)
Chichester (England)	South East England	1075 ("time immemorial")	Chichester parish	Civil parish	29,407 (2021)
Newry (Irish: Iúr Cinn Trá) (Ulster-Scots: Newrie)	Northern Ireland	2002	None	Represented on Newry, Mourne and Down District Council	28,530 (2021)
Truro (England) (Cornish: Truru)	South West England	1877	Truro parish	Civil parish	21,046 (2021)
Ely (England)	East of England	1109 ("time immemorial")	Ely parish	Civil parish	20,574 (2021)
Ripon (England)	Yorkshire and the Humber	1865	Ripon parish	Civil parish	16,590 (2021)
Armagh (Note: Armagh had previously enjoyed city status, with St Patrick's Cathedral the seat of the metropolitan primate of all Ireland. The city status was lost in 1840 when the city corporation was abolished. However, the successor urban district council and district council frequently used the title of city without official sanction prior to 1994.) (Irish: Ard Mhacha) (Ulster-Scots: Airmagh)	Northern Ireland	1994	None	Represented on Armagh City, Banbridge and Craigavon Borough Council	16,310 (2021)
Bangor (Wales)	Wales	"time immemorial"	Bangor community	Community	15,060 (2021)
Wells (England)	South West England	"time immemorial"	Wells parish	Civil parish	11,145 (2021)
St Asaph (Wales) (Welsh: Llanelwy)	Wales	2012	St Asaph community	Community	3,485 (2021)
St Davids (Wales) (Welsh: Tyddewi)	Wales	1994	St Davids and the Cathedral Close (Note: St David's historically had city status because of the presence of St David's Cathedral. In 1849 it was noted that the city had no municipal corporation: There was, however, a recognised "city" in which a mayor had limited jurisdiction. A Royal Commission appointed in 1876 reported that the corporation had long been extinct, and the city was formally abolished in 1886 under the provisions of the Municipal Corporations Act 1883. Letters Patent dated 16 September 1994 ordained that the "Town of St. David's shall have the status of a City".)	Community	1,751 (2021)

== Map of the cities ==
The map shows the 76 cities in the United Kingdom of Great Britain and Northern Ireland and one Crown Dependency, Douglas in the Isle of Man.

Location of cities in the United Kingdom and the Isle of Man:
- Diocese cities before 1230
- English reformation cities (1540–1542); Derry (1604)
- 18th century cities to 2022

Click for Interactive map of cities and their local extents (excludes Douglas)
Shading key: local government area charter trustee extent urban limits

== Overseas Territories and Crown Dependencies ==
The British Overseas Territories and the Crown Dependencies do not form part of the United Kingdom but are part of its sovereign territory. Association of city status with cathedrals ended in 1865. There are presently five cities in the Overseas Territories and Crown Dependencies.

City	Territory or dependency	Year granted or confirmed	Population (census date)
Gibraltar	Gibraltar	1842	32,194 (2012)
Douglas (Manx: Doolish)	Isle of Man	2022	27,938 (2011)
Stanley	Falkland Islands	2022	2,460 (2016)
Hamilton	Bermuda	1897	854 (2016)
Jamestown	Saint Helena	1859	629 (2016)

== See also ==
- Centre for Cities
- City status in Ireland
- List of lord mayoralties and lord provostships in the United Kingdom
- List of smallest cities in the United Kingdom
- List of towns in the United Kingdom
- List of urban areas in the United Kingdom
