= Lord Mayor of Southampton =

- Formation: 1 September 2022

The Lord Mayor of Southampton is an office in Southampton, Hampshire, England.

== History ==
Southampton was granted the status of Lord Mayor on 1 September 2022 in the Platinum Jubilee Civic Honours.

== Lord Mayors ==
| No. | Name | Term | Ref. |
|---|---|---|---|
| 1 | Jacqui Rayment | 2022 – 16 May 2023 | |
| 2 | Valerie Laurent | 17 May 2023 – May 2024 | |
| 3 | Dave Shields | May 2024 – 13 May 2025 | |
| 4 | James Baillie | 14 May 2025 – | |
