= List of towns in the United Kingdom =

In England, Wales and Northern Ireland, a town traditionally was a settlement which had a charter to hold a market or fair and therefore became a "market town". In Scotland, the equivalent is known as a burgh. There are two types of burgh: royal burghs and burghs of barony.

== Town status ==
The Local Government Act 1972 allows Parish Councils in England and Wales to resolve themselves to be Town Councils, under section (245 subsection 6) and thus declare that the settlement is a town. Many former urban districts and municipal boroughs have such a status, along with other settlements with no prior town status. Historically, villages became towns by award of a market charter.

It is sometimes considered that a village becomes a de facto town as soon as it reaches a significant size or population, although this is an informal definition and no particular numbers are agreed upon.

== Lists of towns in the United Kingdom ==
- List of towns in England
  - Lists of towns and cities in England by population
- List of burghs in Scotland
- List of towns in Wales
- List of towns in Northern Ireland

== List of major towns and cities in British Overseas Territories ==
Ranked by population:

- George Town, Cayman Islands (35,600)
- Gibraltar (29,431)
- Hamilton, Bermuda (13,500)
- West Bay, Cayman Islands (11,436)
- Bodden Town, Cayman Islands (10,341)
- Road Town, British Virgin Islands (9,400)
- Cockburn Town, Turks and Caicos Islands (3,700)
- Stanley, Falkland Islands (2,115)
- St. George's Town, Bermuda (1,648)
- Somerset Village, Bermuda (1,000)
- The Valley, Anguilla (1,169)
- Brades, Montserrat (approx. 1,000)

== See also ==
- List of cities in the United Kingdom
- City status in the United Kingdom
- List of places in the United Kingdom
- List of urban areas in the United Kingdom
