= List of towns in England =

This is a list of towns in England.

Historically, towns were any settlement with a charter, including market towns and ancient boroughs. The process of incorporation was reformed in 1835 and many more places received borough charters, whilst others were lost. All existing boroughs were abolished on 1 April 1974 and borough status was reformed as a civic honour for local government districts. At the same time a limited number of former boroughs and other settlements became successor parishes, with the right to be known as a town and preserve their charter. Boroughs that did not become successor parishes formed unparished areas, but were able to preserve their charters without a corporate body by appointing charter trustees. Since 1 April 1974 any parish council in England has the right to resolve to call itself a town council and many communities have taken up this right, including areas that preserved continuity with charter trustees.

This list does not include cities in England.

== Towns ==
This list includes:

- civil parishes with town councils;
- unparished areas that had borough charters before 1 April 1974 (including areas with charter trustees); and
- towns with ancient/market charters that did not later gain borough charters or town councils.

=== A ===
Town	Ceremonial county	Status
Abingdon-on-Thames	Oxfordshire	town council^{1}
Accrington	Lancashire	borough (1878–1974)
Acle	Norfolk	market charter
Acton	Greater London	borough (1921–1965)
Adlington	Lancashire	town council^{1}
Alcester	Warwickshire	town council
Aldeburgh	Suffolk	town council^{1}
Aldershot	Hampshire	borough (1922–1974)
Alford	Lincolnshire	town council^{1}
Alfreton	Derbyshire	town council
Alnwick	Northumberland	town council^{1}
Alsager	Cheshire	town council^{1}
Alston	Cumbria	market charter
Alton	Hampshire	town council^{1}
Altrincham	Greater Manchester	borough (1937–1974)
Amble	Northumberland	town council^{1}
Ambleside	Cumbria	market charter
Amersham	Buckinghamshire	town council
Amesbury	Wiltshire	town council
Ampthill	Bedfordshire	town council^{1}
Andover	Hampshire	borough (1835–1974)
Appleby-in-Westmorland	Cumbria	town council^{1}
Arlesey	Bedfordshire	town council
Arundel	West Sussex	town council^{1}
Ascot	Berkshire	
Ashbourne	Derbyshire	town council^{1}
Ashburton	Devon	town council^{1}
Ashby-de-la-Zouch	Leicestershire	town council^{1}
Ashford	Kent	market charter
Ashington	Northumberland	town council
Ashton-under-Lyne	Greater Manchester	borough (1847–1974)
Askern	South Yorkshire	town council
Atherstone	Warwickshire	town council
Attleborough	Norfolk	town council
Axbridge	Somerset	town council
Axminster	Devon	town council
Aylesbury	Buckinghamshire	town council
Aylsham	Norfolk	town council

=== B ===
Town	Ceremonial county	Status
Bacup	Lancashire	borough (1883–1974)
Bakewell	Derbyshire	town council^{1}
Bampton	Devon	town council
Banbury	Oxfordshire	town council
Banstead	Surrey	town council
Barking	Greater London	Market charter; borough (1931–1965)
Barnard Castle	Durham	town council^{1}
Barnes	Greater London	borough (1932–1965)
Barnoldswick	Lancashire	town council
Barnsley	South Yorkshire	borough (1869–1974)
Barnstaple	Devon	town council^{1}
Barrow-in-Furness	Cumbria	borough (1867–1974)
Barton-upon-Humber	Lincolnshire	town council^{1}
Basildon	Essex	new town (designated 1949)
Basingstoke	Hampshire	borough (1835–1974)
Batley	West Yorkshire	borough (1868–1974)
Battle	East Sussex	town council
Bawtry	South Yorkshire	town council
Beaconsfield	Buckinghamshire	town council^{1}
Beaminster	Dorset	town council
Bebington	Merseyside	borough (1937–1974)
Beccles	Suffolk	town council^{1}
Beckenham	Greater London	borough (1935–1965)
Bedale	North Yorkshire	town council
Bedford	Bedfordshire	borough (1835–1974)
Bedlington	Northumberland	town council
Bedworth	Warwickshire	market charter
Belper	Derbyshire	town council^{1}
Bentham	North Yorkshire	town council
Berkeley	Gloucestershire	town council
Berkhamsted	Hertfordshire	town council^{1}
Berwick-upon-Tweed	Northumberland	town council
Beverley	East Riding of Yorkshire	town council
Bewdley	Worcestershire	town council^{1}
Bexhill-on-Sea	East Sussex	charter trustees
Bexley	Greater London	borough (1937–1965)
Bicester	Oxfordshire	town council^{1}
Biddulph	Staffordshire	town council^{1}
Bideford	Devon	town council^{1}
Biggleswade	Bedfordshire	town council^{1}
Billericay	Essex	town council
Billingham	Durham	town council
Bilston	West Midlands	borough (1938–1967)
Bingham	Nottinghamshire	town council
Bingley	West Yorkshire	market charter
Birchwood	Cheshire	town council
Birkenhead	Merseyside	borough (1877–1974)
Bishop Auckland	Durham	town council
Bishop's Castle	Shropshire	town council
Bishop's Stortford	Hertfordshire	town council^{1}
Bishop's Waltham	Hampshire	market charter
Blackburn	Lancashire	borough (1851–1974)
Blackpool	Lancashire	borough (1867–1974)
Blackrod	Greater Manchester	town council^{1}
Blackwater and Hawley	Hampshire	town council
Blandford Forum	Dorset	town council^{1}
Bletchley and Fenny Stratford	Buckinghamshire	town council
Blyth	Northumberland	town council
Bodmin	Cornwall	town council^{1}
Bognor Regis	West Sussex	town council
Bollington	Cheshire	town council^{1}
Bolsover	Derbyshire	town council^{1}
Bolton	Greater Manchester	borough (1838–1974)
Bootle	Merseyside	borough (1868–1974)
Bordon	Hampshire	town council
Boroughbridge	North Yorkshire	town council
Boston	Lincolnshire	town council
Bottesford	Lincolnshire	town council
Bourne	Lincolnshire	town council^{1}
Bournemouth	Dorset	borough (1890–1974)
Bovey Tracey	Devon	town council
Brackley	Northamptonshire	town council^{1}
Bracknell	Berkshire	new town (designated 1949)
Bradford-on-Avon	Wiltshire	town council^{1}
Brading	Isle of Wight	town council
Bradley Stoke	Gloucestershire	town council
Bradninch	Devon	town council
Braintree	Essex	market charter
Brampton	Cumbria	market charter (1252)
Brandon	Suffolk	town council
Braunstone Town	Leicestershire	town council
Brentford	Greater London	market charter
Brentwood	Essex	market charter
Brewood	Staffordshire	market charter
Bridgnorth	Shropshire	town council
Bridgwater	Somerset	town council
Bridlington	East Riding of Yorkshire	town council
Bridport	Dorset	town council^{1}
Brierfield	Lancashire	town council
Brierley	South Yorkshire	town council
Brigg	Lincolnshire	town council^{1}
Brighouse	West Yorkshire	borough (1893–1974)
Brightlingsea	Essex	town council^{1}
Brixham	Devon	town council
Broadstairs and St Peter's	Kent	town council^{1}
Bromborough	Merseyside	market charter
Bromley	Greater London	borough (1903–1965)
Bromsgrove	Worcestershire	market charter
Bromyard	Herefordshire	town council
Broseley	Shropshire	town council
Brough	East Riding of Yorkshire	town council
Broughton	Lincolnshire	town council
Broughton-in-Furness	Cumbria	market charter
Bruton	Somerset	town council
Buckfastleigh	Devon	town council^{1}
Buckingham	Buckinghamshire	town council^{1}
Bude-Stratton	Cornwall	town council^{1}
Budleigh Salterton	Devon	town council^{1}
Bulwell	Nottinghamshire	market charter
Bungay	Suffolk	town council^{1}
Buntingford	Hertfordshire	town council
Burford	Oxfordshire	town council
Burgess Hill	West Sussex	town council^{1}
Burgh-le-Marsh	Lincolnshire	town council
Burnham-on-Crouch	Essex	town council^{1}
Burnham-on-Sea	Somerset	town council^{1}
Burnley	Lancashire	borough (1861–1974)
Burntwood	Staffordshire	town council
Burslem	Staffordshire	town council
Burton Latimer	Northamptonshire	town council^{1}
Burton upon Trent	Staffordshire	charter trustees (abolished 2003)
Bury	Greater Manchester	borough (1876–1974)
Bury St Edmunds	Suffolk	town council
Bushey	Hertfordshire	market charter
Buxton	Derbyshire	borough (1917–1974)

=== C ===
Town	Ceremonial county	Status
Caistor	Lincolnshire	town council
Callington	Cornwall	town council
Calne	Wiltshire	town council^{1}
Camborne	Cornwall	town council
Camelford	Cornwall	town council
Cannock	Staffordshire	market charter
Canvey Island	Essex	town council
Carnforth	Lancashire	town council^{1}
Carlton Colville	Suffolk	town council
Carshalton	Greater London	Borough (1915–1965)
Carterton	Oxfordshire	town council
Castle Cary	Somerset	town council
Castleford	West Yorkshire	borough (1955–1974)
Caterham	Surrey	town council
Chagford	Devon	stannary charter
Chapel-en-le-Frith	Derbyshire	market charter
Chard	Somerset	town council^{1}
Charlbury	Oxfordshire	town council
Chatham	Kent	borough (1890–1974)
Chatteris	Cambridgeshire	town council^{1}
Cheadle	Staffordshire	town council
Cheltenham	Gloucestershire	borough (1876–1974)
Chertsey	Surrey	market charter
Chesham	Buckinghamshire	town council^{1}
Cheshunt	Hertfordshire	market charter
Chesterfield	Derbyshire	borough (1835–1974)
Chester-le-Street	Durham	market charter
Chickerell	Dorset	town council
Chilton	Durham	town council
Chingford	Greater London	borough (1938–1965)
Chippenham	Wiltshire	town council
Chipping Barnet	Greater London	market charter
Chipping Campden	Gloucestershire	town council
Chipping Norton	Oxfordshire	town council^{1}
Chipping Sodbury	Gloucestershire	town council
Chiswick	Greater London	borough (with Brentford; 1932–1965)
Chorley	Lancashire	borough (1881–1974)
Chorleywood	Hertfordshire	town council^{1}
Christchurch	Dorset	borough (1886–1974)
Chudleigh	Devon	town council
Chulmleigh	Devon	market charter
Church Stretton	Shropshire	town council
Cinderford	Gloucestershire	town council
Cirencester	Gloucestershire	town council^{1}
Clare	Suffolk	market charter
Clay Cross	Derbyshire	town council^{1}
Cleator Moor	Cumbria	town council
Cleckheaton	West Yorkshire	market charter
Cleethorpes	Lincolnshire	charter trustees
Cleobury Mortimer	Shropshire	market charter
Clevedon	Somerset	town council^{1}
Clitheroe	Lancashire	town council^{1}
Clun	Shropshire	town council
Coalville	Leicestershire	town council
Cockermouth	Cumbria	town council^{1}
Coggeshall	Essex	market charter
Colburn	North Yorkshire	town council
Coleford	Gloucestershire	town council
Coleshill	Warwickshire	town council
Colne	Lancashire	town council
Colyton	Devon	market charter
Congleton	Cheshire	town council
Conisbrough	South Yorkshire	market charter
Corbridge	Northumberland	market charter
Corby	Northamptonshire	market charter
Corringham	Essex	market charter
Corsham	Wiltshire	town council
Cosham	Hampshire	town council
Cotgrave	Nottinghamshire	town council
Cowes	Isle of Wight	town council
Coulsdon	Greater London	Municipal Borough (with Purley; 1915–1965)
Cramlington	Northumberland	town council
Cranbrook	Kent	market charter
Craven Arms	Shropshire	town council
Crawley	West Sussex	market charter
Crediton	Devon	town council^{1}
Crewe	Cheshire	charter trustees
Crewkerne	Somerset	town council^{1}
Cricklade	Wiltshire	town council
Cromer	Norfolk	town council^{1}
Crook	Durham	market charter
Crosby	Merseyside	borough (1937–1974)
Crowborough	East Sussex	town council
Croydon	Greater London	borough (1883–1965)
Crowland	Lincolnshire	market charter
Crowle	Lincolnshire	town council
Cullompton	Devon	town council

=== D ===
Town	Ceremonial county	Status
Dagenham	Greater London	borough (1938–1965)
Dalton-in-Furness	Cumbria	Market Charter
Darlaston	West Midlands	market charter
Darley Dale	Derbyshire	town council
Darlington	Durham	borough (1867–1974)
Dartford	Kent	charter trustees (abolished 1977)
Dartmouth	Devon	town council^{1}
Darwen	Lancashire	town council
Daventry	Northamptonshire	town council
Dawley	Shropshire	town council
Dawlish	Devon	town council^{1}
Deal	Kent	town council
Denholme	West Yorkshire	town council
Dereham	Norfolk	town council^{1}
Desborough	Northamptonshire	town council^{1}
Devizes	Wiltshire	town council^{1}
Dewsbury	West Yorkshire	borough (1862–1974)
Didcot	Oxfordshire	town council
Dinnington St John's	South Yorkshire	town council
Diss	Norfolk	town council^{1}
Dorchester	Dorset	town council^{1}
Dorking	Surrey	market charter
Dover	Kent	town council
Dovercourt	Essex	market charter
Downham Market	Norfolk	town council^{1}
Driffield	East Riding of Yorkshire	town council
Droitwich Spa	Worcestershire	town council^{1}
Dronfield	Derbyshire	town council^{1}
Dudley	West Midlands	borough (1865–1974)
Dukinfield	Greater Manchester	borough (1899–1974)
Dulverton	Somerset	town council
Dunstable	Bedfordshire	town council
Dunwich	Suffolk	market charter
Dursley	Gloucestershire	town council

=== E ===
Town	Ceremonial county	Status
Ealing	Greater London	borough (1901–1965)
Earby	Lancashire	town council
Earl Shilton	Leicestershire	town council
Earley	Berkshire	town council
Easingwold	North Yorkshire	town council
East Cowes	Isle of Wight	town council
East Grinstead	West Sussex	town council^{1}
East Ham	Greater London	borough (1904–1965)
Eastbourne	East Sussex	borough (1883–1974)
Eastleigh	Hampshire	borough (1936–1974)
Eastwood	Nottinghamshire	town council^{1}
Eccles	Greater Manchester	borough (1892–1974)
Eccleshall	Staffordshire	market charter
Edenbridge	Kent	town council
Edgware	Greater London	market charter
Edmonton	Greater London	borough (1937–1965)
Egham	Surry	town council
Egremont	Cumbria	town council
Elland	West Yorkshire	market charter
Ellesmere	Shropshire	town council
Ellesmere Port	Cheshire	charter trustees
Elstree and Borehamwood	Hertfordshire	town council
Emsworth	Hampshire	market charter
Enfield	Greater London	borough (1955–1965)
Epping	Essex	town council^{1}
Epsom and Ewell	Surrey	borough from 1937
Epworth	Lincolnshire	town council
Erith	Greater London	borough (1937–1965)
Eton	Berkshire	town council^{1}
Evesham	Worcestershire	town council^{1}
Exmouth	Devon	town council
Eye	Suffolk	town council^{1}

=== F ===
Town	Ceremonial county	Status
Fairford	Gloucestershire	town council
Fakenham	Norfolk	town council
Falmouth	Cornwall	town council^{1}
Fareham	Hampshire	market charter
Faringdon	Oxfordshire	town council
Farnborough	Hampshire	town council
Farnham	Surrey	town council
Faversham	Kent	town council^{1}
Fazeley	Staffordshire	town council
Featherstone	West Yorkshire	town council^{1}
Felixstowe	Suffolk	town council^{1}
Fenton	Staffordshire	one of the six towns of Stoke-on-Trent
Ferndown	Dorset	town council
Ferryhill	Durham	town council
Filey	North Yorkshire	town council^{1}
Filton	Gloucestershire	town council
Finchley	Greater London	borough (1933–1965)
Fleet	Hampshire	town council
Fleetwood	Lancashire	borough (1933–1974)
Flitwick	Bedfordshire	town council
Folkestone	Kent	town council
Fordbridge	West Midlands	town council
Fordingbridge	Hampshire	town council
Fordwich	Kent	town council
Fowey	Cornwall	town council
Framlingham	Suffolk	town council
Frinton and Walton	Essex	town council^{1}
Frodsham	Cheshire	town council
Frome	Somerset	town council^{1}

=== G ===
Town	Ceremonial county	Status
Gainsborough	Lincolnshire	town council
Garstang	Lancashire	town council
Gateshead	Tyne and Wear	borough (1835–1974)
Gerrards Cross	Buckinghamshire	
Gillingham	Dorset	town council
Gillingham	Kent	borough (1903–1974)
Glastonbury	Somerset	town council^{1}
Glossop	Derbyshire	borough (1866–1974)
Godalming	Surrey	town council^{1}
Godmanchester	Cambridgeshire	town council^{1}
Goole	East Riding of Yorkshire	town council
Gorleston-on-Sea	Norfolk	market charter
Gosport	Hampshire	borough (1922–1974)
Grange-over-Sands	Cumbria	town council^{1}
Grantham	Lincolnshire	charter trustees
Grassington	North Yorkshire	market charter
Gravesend	Kent	borough (1835–1974)
Grays	Essex	market charter
Great Dunmow	Essex	town council
Great Torrington	Devon	town council^{1}
Great Yarmouth	Norfolk	borough (1835–1974)
Grimsby	Lincolnshire	charter trustees
Guildford	Surrey	borough (1835–1974)
Guisborough	North Yorkshire	town council^{1}

=== H ===
Town	Ceremonial county	Status
Hadleigh	Suffolk	town council^{1}
Hailsham	East Sussex	town council
Halesowen	West Midlands	borough (1936–1974)
Halesworth	Suffolk	town council^{1}
Halewood	Merseyside	town council
Halifax	West Yorkshire	borough (1848–1974)
Halstead	Essex	town council^{1}
Haltwhistle	Northumberland	town council
Harleston	Norfolk	town council
Harlow	Essex	market charter
Harpenden	Hertfordshire	town council^{1}
Harrogate	North Yorkshire	borough (1884–1974)
Harrow	Greater London	borough (1954–1965)
Hartlepool	Durham	borough (1850–1974)
Harwich	Essex	town council^{1}
Harworth and Bircotes	Nottinghamshire	town council
Haslemere	Surrey	town council^{1}
Haslingden	Lancashire	borough (1891–1974)
Hastings	East Sussex	borough (1835–1974)
Hatfield	Hertfordshire	town council
Hatfield	South Yorkshire	town council
Hatherleigh	Devon	town council
Havant	Hampshire	market charter
Haverhill	Suffolk	town council
Hawkinge	Kent	town council
Haxby	North Yorkshire	town council
Hawes	North Yorkshire	market charter
Hayle	Cornwall	town council
Haywards Heath	West Sussex	town council
Heanor and Loscoe	Derbyshire	town council
Heathfield	East Sussex	market charter
Hebden Royd	West Yorkshire	town council^{1}
Hedge End	Hampshire	town council
Hednesford	Staffordshire	town council
Hedon	East Riding of Yorkshire	town council^{1}
Helmsley	North Yorkshire	town council
Helston	Cornwall	town council^{1}
Hemel Hempstead	Hertfordshire	charter trustees (abolished 1984)
Hemsworth	West Yorkshire	town council^{1}
Hendon	Greater London	borough (1932–1965)
Henley-in-Arden	Warwickshire	market charter
Henley-on-Thames	Oxfordshire	town council^{1}
Hertford	Hertfordshire	town council^{1}
Hessle	East Riding of Yorkshire	town council
Hetton	Tyne and Wear	town council^{1}
Hexham	Northumberland	town council^{1}
Heywood	Greater Manchester	borough (1881–1974)
Higham Ferrers	Northamptonshire	town council^{1}
Highbridge	Somerset	market charter
Highworth	Wiltshire	town council
High Wycombe	Buckinghamshire	charter trustees
Hinckley	Leicestershire	market charter
Hingham	Norfolk	town council
Hitchin	Hertfordshire	market charter
Hoddesdon	Hertfordshire	market charter
Holbeach	Lincolnshire	market charter
Holsworthy	Devon	town council
Holt	Norfolk	town council
Honiton	Devon	town council^{1}
Horley	Surrey	town council
Horncastle	Lincolnshire	town council^{1}
Hornsea	East Riding of Yorkshire	town council^{1}
Hornsey	Greater London	borough (1903–1965)
Horsforth	West Yorkshire	town council
Horsham	West Sussex	town council
Horwich	Greater Manchester	town council^{1}
Houghton Regis	Bedfordshire	town council
Hounslow	Greater London	Borough
Howden	East Riding of Yorkshire	town council
Huddersfield	West Yorkshire	borough (1868–1974)
Hungerford	Berkshire	town council
Hunstanton	Norfolk	town council^{1}
Huntingdon	Cambridgeshire	town council^{1}
Hyde	Greater Manchester	borough (1881–1974)
Hythe	Kent	town council^{1}

=== I ===
Town	Ceremonial county	Status
Ilford	Greater London	borough (1926–1965)
Ilfracombe	Devon	town council^{1}
Ilkeston	Derbyshire	charter trustees (abolished 1975)
Ilkley	West Yorkshire	town council^{1}
Ilminster	Somerset	town council^{1}
Immingham	Lincolnshire	town council
Ingleby Barwick	North Yorkshire	town council
Ipswich	Suffolk	borough (1835–1974)
Irthlingborough	Northamptonshire	town council^{1}
Isleworth	Greater London	borough (with Heston; 1932–1965)
Ivinghoe	Buckinghamshire	
Ivybridge	Devon	town council

=== J ===
Town	Ceremonial county	Status
Jarrow	Tyne and Wear	borough (1875–1974)

=== K ===
Town	Ceremonial county	Status
Keighley	West Yorkshire	town council
Kempston	Bedfordshire	town council^{1}
Kendal	Cumbria	town council^{1}
Kenilworth	Warwickshire	town council^{1}
Kesgrave	Suffolk	town council
Keswick	Cumbria	town council^{1}
Kettering	Northamptonshire	borough (1938–1974)
Keynsham	Somerset	town council
Kidderminster	Worcestershire	charter trustees
Kidsgrove	Staffordshire	town council^{1}
Kimberley	Nottinghamshire	town council
King's Lynn	Norfolk	borough (1835–1974)
Kingsbridge	Devon	town council^{1}
Kingsteignton	Devon	town council
Kingston-upon-Thames	Greater London	borough (1835–1965)
Kington	Herefordshire	town council^{1}
Kirkby-in-Ashfield	Nottinghamshire	market charter
Kirkby Lonsdale	Cumbria	town council
Kirkby Stephen	Cumbria	town council
Kirkbymoorside	North Yorkshire	town council
Kirkham	Lancashire	town council^{1}
Kirton-in-Lindsey	Lincolnshire	town council
Knaresborough	North Yorkshire	town council^{1}
Knutsford	Cheshire	town council^{1}

=== L ===
Town	Ceremonial county	Status
Langport	Somerset	town council
Launceston	Cornwall	town council^{1}
Leatherhead	Surrey	market charter
Lechlade	Gloucestershire	town council
Ledbury	Herefordshire	town council
Leek	Staffordshire	town council^{1}
Leigh	Greater Manchester	borough (1899–1974)
Leighton-Linslade	Bedfordshire	town council^{1}
Leigh-on-Sea	Essex	town council
Leiston	Suffolk	town council^{1}
Leominster	Herefordshire	town council^{1}
Letchworth Garden City	Hertfordshire	town council
Lewes	East Sussex	town council^{1}
Leyburn	North Yorkshire	town council
Leyland	Lancashire	town council
Leyton	Greater London	borough (1926–1965)
Liskeard	Cornwall	town council^{1}
Littlehampton	West Sussex	town council^{1}
Loddon	Norfolk	market charter
Loftus	North Yorkshire	town council^{1}
Long Sutton	Lincolnshire	market charter
Longridge	Lancashire	town council^{1}
Longton	Staffordshire	one of the six towns of Stoke-on-Trent
Longtown	Cumbria	market charter
Looe	Cornwall	town council^{1}
Lostwithiel	Cornwall	town council
Loughborough	Leicestershire	borough (1888–1974)
Loughton	Essex	town council
Louth	Lincolnshire	town council^{1}
Lowestoft	Suffolk	charter trustees
Ludgershall	Wiltshire	town council
Ludlow	Shropshire	town council
Luton	Bedfordshire	borough (1876–1974)
Lutterworth	Leicestershire	town council
Lydd	Kent	town council^{1}
Lydney	Gloucestershire	town council
Lyme Regis	Dorset	town council^{1}
Lymington	Hampshire	town council
Lynton & Lynmouth	Devon	town council^{1}
Lytham St Annes	Lancashire	borough (1922–1974)

=== M ===
Town	Ceremonial county	Status
Mablethorpe and Sutton	Lincolnshire	town council^{1}
Macclesfield	Cheshire	charter trustees
Madeley	Shropshire	market charter
Maghull	Merseyside	town council
Maidenhead	Berkshire	borough (1835–1974)
Maidstone	Kent	borough (1835–1974)
Maldon	Essex	town council
Malmesbury	Wiltshire	town council^{1}
Maltby	South Yorkshire	town council
Malton	North Yorkshire	town council^{1}
Malvern	Worcestershire	town council
Manningtree	Essex	town council
Mansfield	Nottinghamshire	charter trustees
Marazion	Cornwall	town council
March	Cambridgeshire	town council^{1}
Margate	Kent	charter trustees
Market Bosworth	Leicestershire	market charter
Market Deeping	Lincolnshire	town council
Market Drayton	Shropshire	town council
Market Harborough	Leicestershire	market charter
Market Rasen	Lincolnshire	town council^{1}
Market Weighton	East Riding of Yorkshire	town council
Marlborough	Wiltshire	town council^{1}
Marlow	Buckinghamshire	town council^{1}
Maryport	Cumbria	town council^{1}
Masham	North Yorkshire	market charter
Matlock	Derbyshire	town council
Medlar-with-Wesham	Lancashire	town council
Melksham	Wiltshire	town council^{1}
Meltham	West Yorkshire	town council^{1}
Melton Mowbray	Leicestershire	town council
Mere	Wiltshire	town council
Mexborough	South Yorkshire	market charter
Middleham	North Yorkshire	town council
Middlesbrough	North Yorkshire	borough (1853–1967)
Middleton	Greater Manchester	borough (1886–1974)
Middlewich	Cheshire	town council^{1}
Midhurst	West Sussex	town council
Midsomer Norton	Somerset	market charter
Mildenhall	Suffolk	market charter
Millom	Cumbria	town council
Minchinhampton	Gloucestershire	market charter
Minehead	Somerset	town council
Minster	Kent	market charter
Mirfield	West Yorkshire	town council
Mitcham	Greater London	borough (1934–1965)
Mitcheldean	Gloucestershire	market charter
Modbury	Devon	market charter
Morecambe	Lancashire	town council
Moretonhampstead	Devon	market charter
Moreton-in-Marsh	Gloucestershire	town council
Morley	West Yorkshire	town council
Morpeth	Northumberland	borough (1835–1974)
Mossley	Greater Manchester	town council
Much Wenlock	Shropshire	town council

=== N ===
Town	Ceremonial county	Status
Nailsea	Somerset	town council
Nailsworth	Gloucestershire	town council^{1}
Nantwich	Cheshire	town council^{1}
Needham Market	Suffolk	town council
Nelson	Lancashire	town council
Neston	Cheshire	town council
New Alresford	Hampshire	town council
New Malden	Greater London	borough (with Coombe; 1936–1965)
New Mills	Derbyshire	town council^{1}
New Milton	Hampshire	town council
New Romney	Kent	town council^{1}
Newark-on-Trent	Nottinghamshire	town council
Newbiggin-by-the-Sea	Northumberland	town council
Newbury	Berkshire	town council
Newcastle-under-Lyme	Staffordshire	borough (1835–1974)
Newent	Gloucestershire	town council
Newhaven	East Sussex	town council^{1}
Newlyn	Cornwall	market charter
Newmarket	Suffolk	town council
Newport	Isle of Wight	borough (1835–1974)
Newport	Shropshire	town council^{1}
Newport Pagnell	Buckinghamshire	town council
Newquay	Cornwall	town council
Newton Abbot	Devon	town council^{1}
Newton Aycliffe	Durham	town council
Newton-le-Willows	Merseyside	market charter
Normanton	West Yorkshire	town council^{1}
North Hykeham	Lincolnshire	town council
North Petherton	Somerset	town council
North Tawton	Devon	town council
North Walsham	Norfolk	town council^{1}
Northallerton	North Yorkshire	town council^{1}
Northam	Devon	town council^{1}
Northampton	Northamptonshire	borough (1835–1974)
Northfleet	Kent	market charter
Northleach with Eastington	Gloucestershire	town council
Northwich	Cheshire	town council^{1}
Norton-on-Derwent	North Yorkshire	town council^{1}
Nuneaton	Warwickshire	borough (1907–1974)

=== O ===
Town	Ceremonial county	Status
Oadby	Leicestershire	borough
Oakengates	Shropshire	town council
Oakham	Rutland	town council^{1}
Okehampton	Devon	town council^{1}
Oldbury	West Midlands	borough (1935–1966)
Oldham	Greater Manchester	borough (1849–1974)
Ollerton and Boughton	Nottinghamshire	town council
Olney	Buckinghamshire	town council
Ongar	Essex	town council
Orford	Suffolk	market charter
Ormskirk	Lancashire	market charter
Orpington	Greater London	Town
Ossett	West Yorkshire	borough (1890–1974)
Oswestry	Shropshire	town council
Otley	West Yorkshire	town council^{1}
Ottery St Mary	Devon	town council^{1}
Oundle	Northamptonshire	town council^{1}

=== P ===
Town	Ceremonial county	Status
Paddock Wood	Kent	town council
Padiham	Lancashire	town council
Padstow	Cornwall	town council
Paignton	Devon	market charter
Painswick	Gloucestershire	market charter
Partington	Greater Manchester	town council
Patchway	Gloucestershire	town council
Pateley Bridge	North Yorkshire	town council
Peacehaven	East Sussex	town council
Penistone	South Yorkshire	town council^{1}
Penkridge	Staffordshire	market charter
Penrith	Cumbria	market charter
Penryn	Cornwall	town council^{1}
Penwortham	Lancashire	town council
Penzance	Cornwall	town council
Pershore	Worcestershire	town council
Peterlee	Durham	town council
Petersfield	Hampshire	town council^{1}
Petworth	West Sussex	town council
Pickering	North Yorkshire	town council^{1}
Plympton	Devon	market charter
Pocklington	East Riding of Yorkshire	town council
Polegate	East Sussex	town council
Pontefract	West Yorkshire	borough (1835–1974)
Ponteland	Northumberland	town council
Poole	Dorset	borough (1835–1974)
Porthleven	Cornwall	town council
Portishead	Somerset	town council^{1}
Portland	Dorset	town council^{1}
Potton	Bedfordshire	town council
Poynton-with-Worth	Cheshire	town council
Preesall	Lancashire	town council^{1}
Prescot	Merseyside	town council
Princes Risborough	Buckinghamshire	town council
Prudhoe	Northumberland	town council^{1}
Pudsey	West Yorkshire	borough (1900–1974)
Purley	Greater London	town council

=== Q ===
Town	Ceremonial county	Status
Quedgeley	Gloucestershire	town council
Queenborough-in-Sheppey	Kent	charter trustees (abolished 1977)

=== R ===
Town	Ceremonial county	Status
Radstock	Somerset	town council^{1}
Ramsey	Cambridgeshire	town council^{1}
Ramsgate	Kent	town council
Raunds	Northamptonshire	town council^{1}
Rawtenstall	Lancashire	borough (1891–1974)
Rayleigh	Essex	town council
Reading	Berkshire	borough (1835–1974)
Redcar	North Yorkshire	borough (1921–1967)
Redditch	Worcestershire	town council, new town (designated 1964)
Redhill	Surrey	
Redruth	Cornwall	town council
Reepham	Norfolk	town council
Reigate	Surrey	borough (1863–1974)
Retford	Nottinghamshire	charter trustees
Richmond	Greater London	borough (1890–1965)
Richmond	North Yorkshire	town council^{1}
Ringwood	Hampshire	town council
Ripley	Derbyshire	town council^{1}
Rochdale	Greater Manchester	borough (1856–1974)
Rochester	Kent	borough (1835–1974)^{2}
Rochford	Essex	market charter
Romford	Greater London	borough (1937–1965)
Romsey	Hampshire	town council^{1}
Ross-on-Wye	Herefordshire	town council^{1}
Rothbury	Northumberland	market charter
Rotherham	South Yorkshire	borough (1871–1974)
Rothwell	Northamptonshire	town council^{1}
Rothwell	West Yorkshire	market charter
Rowley Regis	West Midlands	borough (1933–1966)
Royal Leamington Spa	Warwickshire	town council
Royal Tunbridge Wells	Kent	borough (1888–1974)
Royal Wootton Bassett	Wiltshire	town council
Royston	Hertfordshire	town council^{1}
Rugby	Warwickshire	borough (1932–1974)
Rugeley	Staffordshire	town council
Runcorn	Cheshire	new town (designated 1964)
Rushden	Northamptonshire	town council
Ryde	Isle of Wight	town council
Rye	East Sussex	town council^{1}

=== S ===
Town	Ceremonial county	Status
Saffron Walden	Essex	town council^{1}
St Austell	Cornwall	town council
St Blaise	Cornwall	town council
St Columb Major	Cornwall	town council
St Helens	Merseyside	borough (1868–1974)
St Ives	Cambridgeshire	town council^{1}
St Ives	Cornwall	town council^{1}
St Just-in-Penwith	Cornwall	town council^{1}
St Mary Cray	Greater London	market charter
St Mawes	Cornwall	market charter
St Neots	Cambridgeshire	town council^{1}
Salcombe	Devon	town council^{1}
Sale	Greater Manchester	borough (1935–1974)
Saltash	Cornwall	town council^{1}
Saltburn-By-The-Sea	North Yorkshire	town council
Sandbach	Cheshire	town council^{1}
Sandhurst	Berkshire	town council
Sandiacre	Derbyshire	market charter
Sandown	Isle of Wight	town council
Sandwich	Kent	town council^{1}
Sandy	Bedfordshire	town council^{1}
Sawbridgeworth	Hertfordshire	town council^{1}
Saxmundham	Suffolk	town council^{1}
Scarborough	North Yorkshire	borough (1835–1974)
Scunthorpe	Lincolnshire	charter trustees
Seaford	East Sussex	town council
Seaham	Durham	town council
Seaton	Devon	town council^{1}
Sedbergh	Cumbria	market charter
Sedgefield	Durham	town council
Selby	North Yorkshire	town council^{1}
Selsey	West Sussex	town council
Settle	North Yorkshire	town council
Sevenoaks	Kent	town council^{1}
Shaftesbury	Dorset	town council^{1}
Shanklin	Isle of Wight	town council
Shefford	Bedfordshire	town council
Shepshed	Leicestershire	town council
Shepton Mallet	Somerset	town council^{1}
Sherborne	Dorset	town council^{1}
Sheringham	Norfolk	town council^{1}
Shifnal	Shropshire	town council
Shildon	Durham	town council^{1}
Shipston-on-Stour	Warwickshire	town council
Shirebrook	Derbyshire	town council
Shoreham-by-Sea	West Sussex	market charter
Shrewsbury	Shropshire	town council
Sidmouth	Devon	town council^{1}
Silloth	Cumbria	town council
Silsden	West Yorkshire	town council^{1}
Sittingbourne	Kent	town council
Skegness	Lincolnshire	town council^{1}
Skelmersdale	Lancashire	town council
Skelton-in-Cleveland	North Yorkshire	market charter
Skipton	North Yorkshire	town council^{1}
Sleaford	Lincolnshire	town council^{1}
Slough	Berkshire	borough (1838–1974)
Smethwick	West Midlands	borough (1899–1966)
Snaith and Cowick	East Riding of Yorkshire	town council
Snodland	Kent	town council
Soham	Cambridgeshire	town council
Solihull	West Midlands	borough (1954–1974)
Somerton	Somerset	town council
South Brent	Devon	market charter
South Cave	East Riding of Yorkshire	market charter
South Elmsall	West Yorkshire	town council
South Kirkby and Moorthorpe	West Yorkshire	town council
South Molton	Devon	town council
South Shields	Tyne and Wear	borough (1850–1974)
South Woodham Ferrers	Essex	town council
Southam	Warwickshire	town council
Southall	Greater London	borough (1936–1965)
Southborough	Kent	town council^{1}
Southgate	Greater London	borough (1933–1965)
Southminster	Essex	market charter
Southport	Merseyside	borough (1866–1974)
Southsea	Hampshire	town council
Southwell	Nottinghamshire	town council
Southwick	Hampshire	market charter
Southwold	Suffolk	town council^{1}
Spalding	Lincolnshire	town council
Spennymoor	Durham	town council^{1}
Spilsby	Lincolnshire	town council
Sprowston	Norfolk	town council
Stafford	Staffordshire	borough (1835–1974)
Staines-upon-Thames	Surrey	market charter
Stainforth	South Yorkshire	town council
Stalbridge	Dorset	town council
Stalham	Norfolk	market charter
Stalybridge	Greater Manchester	borough (1857–1974)
Stamford	Lincolnshire	town council^{1}
Stanley	Durham	town council
Stanhope	Durham	market charter
Stapleford	Nottinghamshire	town council
Staveley	Derbyshire	town council^{1}
Stevenage	Hertfordshire	market charter
Steyning	West Sussex	market charter
Stockport	Greater Manchester	borough (1835–1974)
Stocksbridge	South Yorkshire	town council^{1}
Stockton-on-Tees	Durham/North Yorkshire	borough (1835–1967)
Stoke-upon-Trent	Staffordshire	one of the six towns of Stoke-on-Trent
Stone	Staffordshire	town council^{1}
Stonehouse	Gloucestershire	town council
Stony Stratford	Buckinghamshire	town council
Stotfold	Bedfordshire	town council
Stourbridge	West Midlands	borough (1914–1974)
Stourport-on-Severn	Worcestershire	town council^{1}
Stowmarket	Suffolk	town council^{1}
Stow-on-the-Wold	Gloucestershire	town council
Stratford-upon-Avon	Warwickshire	town council^{1}
Stretford	Greater Manchester	borough (1933–1974)
Strood	Kent	market charter
Stroud	Gloucestershire	town council
Sturminster Newton	Dorset	town council
Sudbury	Suffolk	town council^{1}
Surbiton	Greater London	borough (1936–1965)
Sutton	Greater London	borough (with Cheam; 1934–1965)
Sutton Coldfield	West Midlands	market charter
Swaffham	Norfolk	town council^{1}
Swanage	Dorset	town council^{1}
Swanley	Kent	town council
Swadlincote	Derbyshire	town council
Swanscombe and Greenhithe	Kent	town council^{1}
Swindon	Wiltshire	borough (1900–1974)
Syston	Leicestershire	town council

=== T ===
Town	Ceremonial county	Status
Tadcaster	North Yorkshire	town council
Tadley	Hampshire	town council
Tamworth	Staffordshire	borough (1835–1974)
Taunton	Somerset	borough (1885–1974)
Tavistock	Devon	town council
Teignmouth	Devon	town council^{1}
Telford	Shropshire	new town (designated 1968)
Telscombe	East Sussex	town council
Tenbury Wells	Worcestershire	town council
Tenterden	Kent	town council^{1}
Tetbury	Gloucestershire	town council
Tewkesbury	Gloucestershire	town council^{1}
Thame	Oxfordshire	town council^{1}
Thatcham	Berkshire	town council
Thaxted	Sessex	market charter
Thetford	Norfolk	town council^{1}
Thirsk	North Yorkshire	town council
Thornaby-on-Tees	North Yorkshire	town council
Thornbury	Gloucestershire	town council
Thorne	South Yorkshire	town council
Thorpe St Andrew	Norfolk	town council
Thrapston	Northamptonshire	town council
Tickhill	South Yorkshire	town council^{1}
Tidworth	Wiltshire	town council
Tipton	West Midlands	borough (1938–1966)
Tiverton	Devon	town council^{1}
Todmorden	West Yorkshire	town council^{1}
Tonbridge	Kent	market charter
Topsham	Devon	market charter
Torpoint	Cornwall	town council^{1}
Torquay	Devon	borough (1892–1974)
Totnes	Devon	town council^{1}
Tottenham	Greater London	borough (1934–1965)
Totton and Eling	Hampshire	town council
Tow Law	Durham	town council^{1}
Towcester	Northamptonshire	town council
Tring	Hertfordshire	town council^{1}
Trowbridge	Wiltshire	town council^{1}
Tunstall	Staffordshire	one of the six towns of Stoke-on-Trent
Twickenham	Greater London	borough (1926–1965)
Tynemouth	Tyne and Wear	borough (1849–1974)

=== U ===
Town	Ceremonial county	Status
Uckfield	East Sussex	town council
Ulverston	Cumbria	town council^{1}
Uppingham	Rutland	town council
Upton	Dorset	town council
Upton upon Severn	Worcestershire	town council
Uttoxeter	Staffordshire	town council^{1}
Uxbridge	Greater London	borough (1955–1965)

=== V ===
Town	Ceremonial county	Status
Ventnor	Isle of Wight	town council^{1}
Verwood	Dorset	town council

=== W ===
Town	Ceremonial county	Status
Wadebridge	Cornwall	town council
Wadhurst	East Sussex	market charter
Wainfleet All Saints	Lincolnshire	town council
Wallasey	Merseyside	borough (1910–1974)
Wallingford	Oxfordshire	town council^{1}
Wallington	Greater London	borough (with Beddington; 1937–1965)
Wallsend	Tyne and Wear	borough (1901–1974)
Walsall	West Midlands	borough (1835–1974)
Waltham Abbey	Essex	town council^{1}
Waltham Cross	Hertfordshire	market charter
Walthamstow	Greater London	borough (1926–1965)
Walton-on-Thames	Surrey	market charter
Wantage	Oxfordshire	town council^{1}
Ware	Hertfordshire	town council^{1}
Wareham	Dorset	town council^{1}
Warminster	Wiltshire	town council^{1}
Warrington	Cheshire	borough (1847–1974)
Warwick	Warwickshire	town council^{1}
Washington	Tyne and Wear	new town (designated 1964)
Watchet	Somerset	town council^{1}
Watford	Hertfordshire	borough (1922–1974)
Wath upon Dearne	South Yorkshire	market charter
Watlington	Oxfordshire	market charter
Watton	Norfolk	town council
Wellingborough	Northamptonshire	market charter
Wednesbury	West Midlands	borough (1886 - 1966)
Wellington	Shropshire	town council
Wellington	Somerset	town council^{1}
Wells-next-the-Sea	Norfolk	town council^{1}
Welwyn Garden City	Hertfordshire	new town (designated 1948)
Wem	Shropshire	town council
Wembley	Greater London	borough (1937–1965)
Wendover	Buckinghamshire	market charter
West Bromwich	West Midlands	borough (1882–1974)
West Ham	Greater London	borough (1886–1965)
West Malling	Kent	market charter
West Mersea	Essex	town council^{1}
West Tilbury	Essex	market charter
Westbury	Wiltshire	town council^{1}
Westerham	Kent	market charter
Westhoughton	Greater Manchester	town council
Weston-super-Mare	Somerset	town council
Wetherby	West Yorkshire	town council
Weybridge	Surrey	market charter
Weymouth	Dorset	town council
Whaley Bridge	Derbyshire	town council^{1}
Whitby	North Yorkshire	town council^{1}
Whitchurch	Hampshire	town council
Whitchurch	Shropshire	town council
Whitehaven	Cumbria	borough (1894–1974)
Whitehill	Hampshire	town council
Whitnash	Warwickshire	town council
Whittlesey	Cambridgeshire	town council
Whitworth	Lancashire	town council^{1}
Wickham	Hampshire	market charter
Wickwar	Gloucestershire	market charter
Widnes	Cheshire	borough (1892–1974)
Wigan	Greater Manchester	borough (1835–1974)
Wigton	Cumbria	town council
Willenhall	West Midlands	market charter
Willesden	Greater London	borough (1933–1965)
Wilton	Wiltshire	town council^{1}
Wilmslow	Cheshire	town council
Wimbledon	Greater London	borough (1905–1965)
Wimborne Minster	Dorset	town council^{1}
Wincanton	Somerset	town council
Winchcombe	Gloucestershire	town council
Winchelsea	East Sussex	market charter
Windermere	Cumbria	town council^{1}
Windsor	Berkshire	borough (1835–1974)
Winsford	Cheshire	town council^{1}
Winslow	Buckinghamshire	town council
Winterton	Lincolnshire	town council
Wirksworth	Derbyshire	town council^{1}
Wisbech	Cambridgeshire	town council^{1}
Witham	Essex	town council
Withernsea	East Riding of Yorkshire	town council
Witney	Oxfordshire	town council^{1}
Wiveliscombe	Somerset	town council
Wivenhoe	Essex	town council^{1}
Wixams	Bedfordshire	
Woburn	Bedfordshire	market charter
Woburn Sands	Buckinghamshire	town council
Woking	Surrey	market charter
Wokingham	Berkshire	town council^{1}
Wolsingham	Durham	market charter
Wolverton and Greenleys	Buckinghamshire	town council
Wood Green	Greater London	borough (1933–1965)
Woodford	Greater London	borough (with Wanstead; 1937–1965)
Woodbridge	Suffolk	town council^{1}
Woodley	Berkshire	town council
Woodstock	Oxfordshire	town council^{1}
Wooler	Northumberland	market charter
Workington	Cumbria	town council
Worksop	Nottinghamshire	charter trustees
Worthing	West Sussex	borough (1890–1974)
Wotton-under-Edge	Gloucestershire	town council
Wragby	Lincolnshire	town council
Wymondham	Norfolk	town council^{1}

=== Y ===
Town	Ceremonial county	Status
Yarm	North Yorkshire	town council
Yarmouth	Isle of Wight	town council
Yate	Gloucestershire	town council
Yateley	Hampshire	town council
Yeovil	Somerset	town council

== See also ==
- List of places in England
- Mill towns in the United Kingdom
- List of cities in the United Kingdom
- List of post towns in the United Kingdom
- List of United Kingdom locations
- Category:Towns in England by county
- Urban district (Great Britain and Ireland), settlement areas in the pre-1974 reform governance structure which had town-equivalent populations to municipal boroughs which could include a market town.

== Notes ==
- 1 Successor parish under the Local Government Act 1972
- 2 Rochester has held city status, but this lapsed in 1998 when the Borough of Rochester-upon-Medway was merged into Medway unitary authority.
