= List of lord mayoralties and lord provostships in the United Kingdom =

This is a list of lord mayoralties and lord provostships in the United Kingdom. The dignity of having a lord mayor as civic head is granted to 28 of the 68 districts enjoying city status in England, Wales, and Northern Ireland. In Scotland the similar office of lord provost is reserved for the convener of the four largest of the eight Scottish cities. Four of the lord mayors and two of the lord provosts have the right to the style The Right Honourable.

Before 1863, only York, the City of London, and Dublin had lord mayors, and only Edinburgh and Glasgow had lord provosts. The first four were styled The Right Honourable.

Aberdeen was given a lord provost in 1863. In 1892, Dundee became the last city to be granted a lord provostship, and Belfast was granted a lord mayoralty, as was Cork in 1900. Cork and Dublin ceased to be part of the United Kingdom in 1922, but still have lord mayors. Cardiff was granted the first lord mayoralty in Wales in 1905. Between 1893 and 1935, fifteen cities in England were given a lord mayor: Liverpool, Manchester, Birmingham, Leeds, Sheffield, Bristol, Newcastle, Bradford, Norwich, Hull, Stoke-on-Trent, Nottingham, Leicester, Portsmouth, and Plymouth.

In the fifties and sixties, lord mayoralties were granted to the English cities of Coventry (1953), Oxford (1962), and Westminster (1966). In 1982, Swansea became the second Welsh city to be given a lord mayor. Three further cities in England were granted lord mayoralties in 1988 (Canterbury), 1992 (Chester), and 2002 (Exeter). In 2012, Armagh became the second city in Northern Ireland with a lord mayor. For Queen Elizabeth II's Platinum Jubilee in 2022, the English city of Southampton was granted a lord mayoralty.

The right to the style The Right Honourable was conferred upon the Lord Provost of Glasgow in 1912, the Lord Mayor of Belfast in 1923, and the Lord Mayor of Cardiff in 1956.

== Lord mayoralties (England and Wales) ==
| Lord mayoralty | Year dignity granted | Notes | Metropolitan borough |
England
| Birmingham | 1896 | Letters patent dated 3 June 1896. | Confirmed to metropolitan borough by letters patent dated 25 June 1974. |
| Bradford | 1907 | Letters patent dated 16 September 1907. At the time, Bradford was the seventh most populous borough in England and Wales, and the second largest in area, and thus the largest municipality without a lord mayor. | Confirmed to metropolitan borough by letters patent dated 1 April 1974. |
| Bristol | 1899 | The Lord Mayoralty of Bristol was granted as part of the 1899 Birthday Honours. Confirmed to non-metropolitan district by letters patent dated 1 April 1974. | non |
| Canterbury | 1988 | Letters Patent dated 13 July 1988. The dignity was granted while the 12th Lambeth Conference of the Anglican Church was being held in the city. | |
| Chester | 1992 | Letters Patent dated 10 March 1992. Dignity granted as part of celebrations of the 40th anniversary of accession of Elizabeth II. | |
| Coventry | 1953 | Letters patent dated 3 June 1953. Granted as part of the coronation celebrations of Elizabeth II. | Confirmed to metropolitan borough by letters patent dated 1 April 1974. |
| Exeter | 2002 | Letters patent dated 26 April 2002. Granted as the result of a competition to celebrate the Golden Jubilee of Elizabeth II. | |
| Kingston upon Hull | 1914 | Declaration that the Chief Magistrate and Officer of the city to bear the style and title of Lord Mayor due to "the city's high position in the roll of ports of [the] kingdom" 26 June 1914. Confirmed to non-metropolitan district by letters patent dated 18 March 1975. | non |
| Leeds | 1897 | Letters patent dated 12 July 1897. Dignity granted as part of celebrations of Queen Victoria's diamond jubilee. | Confirmed to metropolitan borough by letters patent dated 1 April 1974. |
| Leicester | 1928 | Letters patent dated 10 July 1928. Confirmed to non-metropolitan district by letters patent dated 1 April 1974. | non |
| Liverpool | 1893 | Letters patent dated 3 August 1893. | Confirmed to metropolitan borough by letters patent dated 25 June 1974. |
| City of London (The Rt Hon.) | Assumed by 1540 | Customary title, never formally granted. Title of Lord Mayor of London used intermittently from middle of 14th century, consistently from 1540. "Right Honourable" in use since 16th century. | |
| Manchester | 1893 | Letters patent dated 3 August 1893. | Confirmed to metropolitan borough by letters patent dated 1 April 1974. |
| Newcastle upon Tyne | 1906 | Letters patent dated 27 July 1906. The grant was announced by Edward VII on a visit to the city on 12 July, having been approved by the Home Office as Newcastle was "the chief town and seaport of the North of England". | Confirmed to metropolitan borough by letters patent dated 1 April 1974. |
| Norwich | 1910 | The Lord Mayoralty was granted in 1910 "in view of the position occupied by that city as the chief city of East Anglia and of its close association with his Majesty" Confirmed to non-metropolitan district by letters patent dated 1 April 1974. | non |
| Nottingham | 1928 | Letters patent dated 10 July 1928. Confirmed to non-metropolitan district by letters patent dated 1 April 1974. | non |
| Oxford | 1962 | Letters patent dated 23 October 1962. Confirmed to non-metropolitan district by letters patent dated 1 April 1974. | non |
| Plymouth | 1935 | Letters patent dated 6 May 1935. Dignity granted as part of silver jubilee celebrations of George V. Confirmed to non-metropolitan district by letters patent dated 1 April 1974. | non |
| Portsmouth | 1928 | Letters patent dated 10 July 1928. Confirmed to non-metropolitan district by letters patent dated 1 April 1974. | non |
| Sheffield | 1897 | Letters patent dated 12 July 1897. Dignity granted as part of celebrations of Queen Victoria's diamond jubilee. | Confirmed to metropolitan borough by letters patent dated 28 May 1974. |
| Southampton | 2022 | Letters patent dated 1 September 2022. Dignity granted as part of celebrations to mark the Platinum Jubilee of Elizabeth II. | |
| Stoke-on-Trent | 1928 | Letters patent dated 10 July 1928. Confirmed to non-metropolitan district by letters patent dated 28 May 1974. | Confirmed to metropolitan borough by letters patent dated 28 May 1974. |
| Westminster | 1966 | Letters patent dated 11 March 1966, replacing the previous Mayor. | |
| York (The Rt Hon.) | c. 1389 | Charter of Richard II. It is often claimed that the king wished to make York capital of England, but this is largely discounted by modern historians. The use of the prefix "right honourable" appears to have been used since the creation of the lord mayoralty. Confirmed to non-metropolitan district by letters patent dated 1 April 1974. Reconfirmed by letters patent to unitary authority dated 1 April 1996. | |
Wales
| Cardiff (The Rt Hon.) | 1905 | Style of "right honourable" conferred on Lord Mayor by letters patent dated 26 October 1956. The city was designated the capital of Wales at that date. Confirmed to district by letters patent dated 1 April 1974, and to unitary authority by letters patent dated 29 March 1996. | |
| Swansea | 1982 | Letters patent dated 22 March 1982. The dignity was announced by Charles, Prince of Wales at a gala to celebrate his wedding in October 1981. | |

== Lord provostships (Scotland) ==
| Lord provostship | Year dignity granted | Notes |
|---|---|---|
| Aberdeen | 1863 | Dignity granted 13 October 1863 on occasion of conferring of knighthood on provost of the city. |
| Dundee | 1892 | Royal warrant dated 12 February 1892. The title was used from 1887 in anticipation of the grant. |
| Edinburgh (The Rt Hon.) | 1667 | Letter of writ from Charles II to the chief magistrate of Edinburgh, reserving the title "lord provost" to the burgh and giving the same precedence as the Lord Mayors of London and Dublin. The prefix "right honourable" was used from this date. |
| Glasgow (The Rt Hon.) | 1688 | Courtesy title of "lord" and prefix of "honourable" in use from 1688. The prefix "right honourable" was allowed in 1912. |

The lord provostships of the cities of Aberdeen, Dundee, Edinburgh and Glasgow were confirmed to the new local authorities formed by the Local Government (Scotland) Act 1973 and Local Government etc. (Scotland) Act 1994.

== Lord mayoralties (Northern Ireland) ==
| Lord mayoralty | Year dignity granted | Notes |
|---|---|---|
| Armagh | 2012 | Dignity announced March 2012 as part of the Diamond Jubilee celebrations of Elizabeth II. The first Lord Mayor was appointed on 25 June 2012. |
| Belfast (The Rt Hon.) | 1892 | Letters patent under the Great Seal of Ireland, 1892. Prefix "right honourable" granted 1923 in recognition of the city's status as capital of Northern Ireland. |

== Use of prefix "The Right Honourable" ==
The lord mayors of the City of London, York, and Dublin and the Lord Provost of Edinburgh had established the right to the use of the honorific prefix "The Right Honourable" (The Rt Hon.) by the seventeenth century. When new lord mayoralties were created in the 1890s it was not clear if they also enjoyed this privilege. When the grant of a lord mayor was made to Liverpool and Manchester in 1893, Sir Albert William Woods, Garter Principal King of Arms, was of the opinion that

...the chief magistrates of those cities on which the dignity was conferred should be able to use the prefix of "right honourable" in the same way as London had done from time immemorial.

Ten years later his successor as Garter, Sir Alfred Scott-Gatty, decided that this was in error. However, the lord mayors of Liverpool, Manchester and Bristol continued to use the prefix. The matter came to a head in 1921, when King George V visited Liverpool, and the Home Office was forced to write to the council to inform that it could not be used without the express permission of the monarch. In the meantime, the prefix had been formally granted to the Lord Provost of Glasgow in 1912. In 1923 the Lord Mayor of Belfast was granted the honour in recognition of the city's new status as capital of Northern Ireland.

The controversy continued however. Professor John J. Clarke of the University of Liverpool (author of Outlines of Local Government), the Corporation of Manchester and Herbert Woodcock, MP for Liverpool Everton all pressed for the dignity to be applied to all lord mayors. The official position was set out in a parliamentary statement by the Home Secretary, William Joynson-Hicks in July 1927, and repeated in a Home Office document issued in July 1932:

The only Lord Mayors and Provosts in the United Kingdom who are entitled to be styled "Right Honourable" are the Lord Mayors of London and York and the Lord Provost of Edinburgh who have had the privilege from time immemorial, and the Lord Provost of Glasgow and the Lord Mayor of Belfast on whom it has been conferred by grant in modern times. If it has been used in other cases, this has been done through a misunderstanding and without authority; and whenever the attention of myself or of my predecessors has been called to such unauthorised use, or inquiries on the subject have been made, it has always been pointed out that the style could not be used without His Majesty's permission.

The number of lord mayors or provosts in the United Kingdom entitled to the prefix now stands at six: in 1956 the dignity was allowed to the Lord Mayor of Cardiff, when the city was declared capital of Wales. The Lord Mayor of Bristol continues to use the prefix without official sanction.

== Map ==
On the map below, the first year refers to the granting/confirmation of city status, while the second year refers to the conferral of the lord mayoralty or lord provostship. No years are given for the cities that had a lord mayor or lord provost before 1863. The six cities where the lord mayor or lord provost has the right to the style The Right Honourable are labelled in ALL CAPS: York, the City of London, Edinburgh, Glasgow (since 1912), Belfast (since 1923), and Cardiff (since 1956).

Location of cities in the United Kingdom with a lord mayor or lord provost:
Lord mayoralty or lord provostship before 1863
Lord provostship 1863 (Aberdeen)
Lord mayoralty or lord provostship 1892–1935
Lord mayoralty 1953–2022 (in the reign of Queen Elizabeth II)

== See also ==
- City status in the United Kingdom
- List of cities in the United Kingdom
- City status in Ireland
- Towns of the United Kingdom
- Mayors in England
