= Barnard Castle Urban District =

Former local government area in the UK

Barnard Castle Urban District was the local government area for the urban district of Barnard Castle in County Durham created in 1894 and dissolved in 1974 when it became part of Teesdale. The town also governed the Barnard Castle Rural District throughout the period.
