= Teesdale (district) =

Former local government district in England

Coordinates: 54.545°N 1.927°W

Teesdale District
- Shown within ceremonial County Durham
- History
  - Origin: Barnard Castle Urban District; Barnard Castle Rural District; Startforth Rural District
  - Created: 1974
  - Abolished: 2009
  - Succeeded by: County Durham
- Status: District
- ONS code: 20UH
- Government: Teesdale District Council
  - HQ: Barnard Castle

Teesdale was, from 1974 to 2009, a local government district in County Durham, England. Its council was based in Barnard Castle and it was named after the valley of the River Tees.

That part of the district south of the River Tees is historically part of the North Riding of Yorkshire, and made up Startforth Rural District before the Local Government Act 1972 came into effect in 1974. The other predecessors to the district were Barnard Castle Urban District and Barnard Castle Rural District.

Much of the area had before 1894 constituted a single Teesdale rural sanitary district.

The district was the least-populous ordinary district in England (with a population of 24,457 in 2001), with only the City of London and the Isles of Scilly being smaller. It also had the third-lowest population density in England, after the former districts of Eden in Cumbria and Tynedale in Northumberland.

The district was abolished as part of the 2009 structural changes to local government in England.

== Electoral divisions ==
- Barnard Castle East Barnard Castle East ward; Barnard Castle North ward; Eggleston ward; Gainford and Winston ward; Ingleton ward; Staindrop ward; Streatlam and Whorlton ward
- Barnard Castle West Barnard Castle West ward; Barningham and Ovington ward; Cotherstone with Lartington ward; Greta ward; *Middleton-in-Teesdale ward; Romaldkirk ward; Startforth ward
- Evenwood Cockfield ward; Etherley ward; Evenwood, Ramshaw and Lands ward; Hamsterley and South Bedburn ward; Lynesack ward

== Energy policy ==
In May 2006, a report commissioned by British Gas showed that housing in Teesdale produced the 2nd highest average carbon emissions in the country at 7,731 kg of carbon dioxide per dwelling.

== Crime ==
In 2009, a league table of burglary "hotspots" in England and Wales was published. In it, it was revealed that Teesdale has some of the lowest burglaries than any other part of the country. In 2008, only 14 burglaries were committed, or 1.2 for every 1,000 homes.

== See also ==
- Energy efficiency in British housing
