= Durham Rural District =

Former local government area in the UK

Coordinates: 54.777°N 1.581°W

Durham was a rural district in County Durham, England from 1894 to 1974. It was created under the Local Government Act 1894 based on the Durham rural sanitary district and covered an area around the City of Durham, which was a municipal borough.

It was abolished in 1974 under the Local Government Act 1972 and went to form part of the new City of Durham district.
