= 2009 structural changes to local government in England =

2009 changes to the structure of state administration on a local level in England

Map of districts in England following the 2009 changes Two-tier structures merged into single unitary authorities Existing districts merged into multiple new authorities Areas unaffected by review

On 1 April 2009 structural changes to local government in England took place which reformed the local government of seven non-metropolitan counties: Bedfordshire, Cheshire, Cornwall, County Durham, Shropshire, Northumberland, and Wiltshire. In each case the government of the county was changed from a two-tier to a unitary system, with Bedfordshire and Cheshire being divided into two new unitary authorities.

Elections to the new authorities took place on 1 May 2008 for some of the new authorities, which took up their powers on 1 April 2009. In the remaining authorities elections took place two months later on 4 June 2009.

== Background ==
Following the passing of the Local Government Act 1992, the Local Government Commission for England recommended a number of unitary authorities to be created in England during the 1990s. The changes that were implemented meant that much of the country continued to have a two-tier arrangement of local government. Further proposals for unitary authorities in northern England, tied to the option of regional devolution, were put to a referendum in 2004 and were rejected. In 2006 the white paper Strong and Prosperous Communities invited local authorities in England to submit their own consensus-based proposals for unitary authority arrangements, to be submitted before 25 January 2007. Selected submissions went to a public consultation from March until June, with successful proposals announced in July. Legislative requirements for implementation were in place following the enactment of the Local Government and Public Involvement in Health Act 2007.

== Proposed changes ==
=== Early responses ===
Various local councils indicated their wish to seek unitary authority status. One town and three cities were overlooked by the 1990s review: Ipswich, Oxford, Norwich and Exeter proposed unitary status on their present boundaries, and commissioned a report jointly to press their case. Norwich announced its intention to respond to the invitation, as did Ipswich and Exeter. In Lancashire, Preston and South Ribble desired to form a single unitary authority although Preston bid for it alone. The City of Lancaster considered seeking unitary status on its present boundaries (having supported a merger with South Lakeland and Barrow-in-Furness to form a Morecambe Bay unitary authority during the referendums review). Blackpool advocated a merger with the Fylde and Wyre districts, which they did not support. Pendle and Burnley also tried to form a unitary authority with Rossendale; however Rossendale rejected this.

The Local Government Chronicle suggested that the non-metropolitan counties of Cornwall, Shropshire, Durham, Cumbria and Northumberland would fit the government's criteria, and that the government would be unlikely to favour carving out unitary authorities from existing two-tier counties. Shropshire County Council, as well as two of the five districts of Shropshire, stated their wish for a move to unitary status. The issue was considered in Durham and Cumbria and the idea of a North Cumbria authority covering the Eden, Copeland, Carlisle and Allerdale districts had some support. The issue was also considered in Northumberland, with the county council in favour of one Northumberland unitary authority. Alan Beith, the MP for Berwick at the far north of Northumberland, suggested instead a three unitary solution, with authorities for the largely rural north and south-west, and an authority for the urban south-east (Wansbeck and Blyth Valley).

=== Consultation period ===
On 26 January 2007, the government confirmed that 26 proposals for unitary authorities had been received. Various county councils proposed they should become unitary authorities: Bedfordshire, Cheshire, Cornwall, Cumbria, Durham, North Yorkshire, Northumberland, Shropshire, Somerset and Wiltshire. Districts seeking to become unitary authorities on their own were Bedford, Exeter, Ipswich, Lancaster, Oxford, Preston. Pendle and Burnley proposed merging as a unitary authority. On 27 March 2007, the government announced that the proposals by Bedfordshire, Bedford, Cornwall, Cheshire, Cumbria, Durham, Exeter, Ipswich, North Yorkshire, Norwich, Shropshire, Somerset and Wiltshire to become unitary authorities would go into the next phase, as would the proposal of Chester for a two-unitary authority Cheshire and by the districts of Northumberland for a two-unitary Northumberland.

On 25 July 2007 it was announced that the unitary proposals by Cumbria, North Yorkshire and Somerset had been rejected. On 5 December 2007 it was explained that the unitary proposals by Exeter, and Ipswich, like those of Norwich (which were referred for review on 25 July 2007) did not meet the requirements to proceed; but may be reconsidered after the Boundary Committee has conducted a review of local government structures across the whole of the two-tier counties they are currently a part of.

A legal challenge was made by Shrewsbury and Atcham Borough Council and by Congleton Borough Council to the government's decisions, on the basis (amongst other things) that the reviews were made without statutory authority. The High Court and then on 4 March 2008 the Court of Appeal rejected the challenge, finding that the review had been legalised retrospectively.

Region	Proposed by	Proposal	Result
East	Bedfordshire County Council	single unitary authority	No Not proceeding
East	Bedford Borough Council	unitary authority with existing boundaries	Yes Implemented
East	Mid Bedfordshire District Council; South Bedfordshire District Council	unitary Central Bedfordshire	Yes Implemented
East	Ipswich Borough Council	unitary authority with existing boundaries	Referred to Boundary Committee who decided in February 2010 that while there was support for a unitary structure in Suffolk there were divergent views on what that structure should be. Accordingly, they suggested the establishment of "a countywide constitutional convention to reach a consensus on a unitary solution".
East	Norwich City Council	unitary authority with existing boundaries	Referred to Boundary Committee. In February 2010 it was announced that Norwich was to become a unitary authority in April 2011, subject to the approval of Parliament.
East Midlands	no bids		
London	not affected by the review		
North East	Durham County Council	single unitary authority	Yes Implemented
North East	Northumberland County Council	single unitary authority	Yes Implemented
North East	Northumberland districts	two unitary authorities	No Not proceeding
North West	Cheshire County Council	single unitary authority	No Not proceeding
North West	Chester City Council	two unitary authorities: Cheshire West and Chester and Cheshire East	Yes Implemented
North West	Cumbria County Council	single unitary authority	No Not proceeding
South East	no bids		
South West	Cornwall County Council	single unitary authority, Cornwall Council	Yes Implemented
South West	Exeter City Council	unitary authority with existing boundaries	Referred to Boundary Committee. In February 2010 it was announced that Exeter was to become a unitary authority in April 2011, subject to the approval of Parliament.
South West	Somerset County Council	single unitary authority	No Not proceeding
South West	Wiltshire County Council	single unitary authority	Yes Implemented
Yorkshire and the Humber	North Yorkshire County Council	single unitary authority	No Not proceeding
West Midlands	Shropshire County Council	single unitary authority	Yes Implemented

† - in the context of examining options for unitary arrangements in the wider county area.

‡ - the Boundary Committee is asked to advise whether an alternative unitary proposal for Norwich based on revised council boundaries could deliver the required improvements.

== Successful proposals ==
On 27 March 2007 Local Government Minister Phil Woolas announced that 16 councils bidding for unitary status had been shortlisted to go forward for public consultation. On 25 July 2007 Woolas' successor John Healey announced that nine proposals would proceed, subject to the approval of Parliament in the Local Government and Public Involvement in Health Act 2007. A further announcement on 5 December indicated that only the five county level proposals (Cornwall, Durham, Northumberland, Shropshire, and Wiltshire) would proceed, while further consideration was to be given to the various proposals submitted for two more county areas (Bedfordshire and Cheshire). On 18 December it was confirmed that the two-authority plan for Cheshire would proceed. On 6 March 2008 it was confirmed that proposals for Bedford Borough Council to become a unitary authority on its existing boundaries, and for Mid Bedfordshire District Council and South Bedfordshire District Council to merge to create a new Central Bedfordshire authority would be implemented.

=== Single authorities ===
In the following areas, the existing non-metropolitan county has now also become a non-metropolitan district (i.e. a "unitary county") and the previously existing non-metropolitan districts have been abolished.

Ceremonial county	Non-metropolitan districts abolished in 2009	New unitary authority from 2009	Existing unitary authorities from 1990s reforms	Map pre-2009	Map after 2009
Cornwall	Penwith; Kerrier; Carrick; Restormel (Borough); Caradon; North Cornwall	Cornwall	Isles of Scilly †	1. North Cornwall; 2. Caradon; 3. Restormel; 4. Carrick; 5. Kerrier; 6. Penwith; 7. Isles of Scilly	1. Cornwall; 2. Isles of Scilly
Durham	Durham (City); Easington; Sedgefield (Borough); Teesdale; Wear Valley; Derwentside; Chester-le-Street	Durham	Hartlepool; Darlington; Stockton-on-Tees (part)	1. City of Durham; 2. Easington; 3. Sedgefield; 4. Teesdale; 5. Wear Valley; 6. Derwentside; 7. Chester-le-Street; 8. Hartlepool; 9. Darlington; 10. Stockton-on-Tees	1. County Durham; 2. Hartlepool; 3. Darlington; 4. Stockton-on-Tees
Northumberland	Blyth Valley (Borough); Wansbeck; Castle Morpeth (Borough); Tynedale; Alnwick; Berwick-upon-Tweed (Borough)	Northumberland	none	1. Berwick-upon-Tweed; 2. Alnwick; 3. Tynedale; 4. Castle Morpeth; 5. Wansbeck; 6. Blyth Valley	1. Northumberland
Shropshire	North Shropshire; Oswestry (Borough); Shrewsbury and Atcham (Borough); South Shropshire; Bridgnorth	Shropshire	Telford and Wrekin	1. North Shropshire; 2. Oswestry; 3. Shrewsbury and Atcham; 4. South Shropshire; 5. Bridgnorth; 6. Telford and Wrekin	1. Shropshire; 2. Telford and Wrekin
Wiltshire	Salisbury; West Wiltshire; Kennet; North Wiltshire	Wiltshire	Swindon	1. Salisbury District; 2. West Wiltshire; 3. Kennet District; 4. North Wiltshire; 5. Swindon	1. Wiltshire; 2. Swindon

† sui generis unitary authority since 1890

=== Multiple authorities ===
In the following areas, the pre-2009 non-metropolitan counties have been abolished. Each of the two new non-metropolitan districts in Cheshire (resulting from amalgamations of the existing districts) is now also a non-metropolitan county. In Bedfordshire, the new Central Bedfordshire district (resulting from the amalgamation of two existing districts) is now also a non-metropolitan county, and the previous Bedford district is now a unitary authority area.

Ceremonial county	Non-metropolitan districts abolished in 2009	New unitary authorities from 2009	Existing unitary authorities from 1990s reforms	Map pre-2009	Map after 2009
Bedfordshire	Mid Bedfordshire; South Bedfordshire	Bedford ‡ Central Bedfordshire	Luton	1. Bedford; 2. Mid Bedfordshire; 3. South Bedfordshire; 4. Luton	1. Bedford; 2. Central Bedfordshire; 3. Luton
Cheshire	Ellesmere Port and Neston (Borough); Chester (District and City); Crewe and Nantwich (Borough); Congleton (Borough); Macclesfield (Borough); Vale Royal (Borough)	Cheshire West and Chester; Cheshire East	Warrington; Halton	1. Ellesmere Port and Neston; 2. Chester; 3. Crewe and Nantwich; 4. Congleton; 5. Macclesfield; 6. Vale Royal; 7. Halton; 8. Warrington	1. Cheshire West and Chester; 2. Cheshire East; 3. Warrington; 4. Halton

‡ existing district

== Further changes ==
The Boundary Committee for England has completed its structural reviews for Norfolk, Suffolk and Devon.

Initial draft proposals were published in July 2008. The committee was expected to make final recommendations by 31 December 2008, but these were delayed, due to legal challenges; and because they didn't assess the potential new authorities in proposals which would have split up the counties between two or more unitaries in aggregate. As a result, a further set of draft proposals were published in March 2009:

=== Draft proposals for Devon ===
The further draft recommendations propose two unitary options:

- A Devon unitary authority comprising the existing county of Devon, with no changes to Plymouth and Torbay.
- An Exeter and Exmouth unitary authority, and a unitary authority covering the remainder of Devon, with no changes to Plymouth and Torbay.

=== Draft proposals for Norfolk ===
The further draft recommendations propose two unitary options:

- A single Norfolk unitary authority comprising the existing county of Norfolk.
- A two authority structure with greater Norwich unitary authority and a rural Norfolk unitary authority for the rest of the county.

=== Draft proposals for Suffolk ===
The further draft recommendations propose two unitary options:

- A single Suffolk unitary authority comprising the existing county of Suffolk.
- A two authority structure with a North Haven unitary authority consisting of Ipswich and Felixstowe, and a rural Suffolk unitary authority for the rest of the county.

=== Final recommendations ===
Final recommendations were then due in July 2009, but a successful legal challenge from three District Councils in Suffolk wanting a three unitary model for Suffolk to be considered by the committee resulted in a further delay. The Boundary Committee appealed this decision in favour of Forest Heath, St Edmundsbury & Waveney Councils in October 2009; in December (2009) they found out their appeal had been successful.

The Boundary Committee has now submitted its final recommendations to the Secretary of State. In all three counties the committee has stated that its preferred option is for a countywide unitary covering the whole of the existing two-tier area to be implemented. In addition in relation to Suffolk they have stated they have no major reservations about the two unitary pattern of North Haven & Rural Suffolk being adopted. Interested parties had until 19 January 2010 to make their representations to the Secretary of State.

=== Decision on reform ===
On 10 February 2010, Rosie Winterton, Minister of State for Local Government, announced the proposed final decisions on the unitary proposals:

- Norwich to become a unitary authority, the remainder of Norfolk to retain two-tier structure due to lack of support for change.
- Exeter to become a unitary authority, the remainder of Devon to retain two-tier structure, again due to lack of support locally. The boundaries of Exeter are to remain unchanged.
- Suffolk to be divided into unitary authority areas, the boundaries of which will be decided by a countywide convention.

The changes in Devon/Exeter and Norfolk/Norwich were to come into effect in April 2011, subject to judicial review. Draft structural changes orders were approved by the House of Lords on 22 March 2010, though the Lords took the unusual step of formally noting its regret. The amendments did not alter the draft orders or affect the legal validity of the Lords approval. The House of Commons approved the draft orders on 23 March. The final Exeter and Norwich orders were made on 24 March following a Government statement responding to the Lords vote. However, the orders were quashed in a judicial review causing elections to be held in Exeter and Norwich in September 2010.

=== Cancellation of further structural changes ===
The Queen's Speech at the May 2010 State Opening of Parliament included a Local Government Bill to revoke structural change orders that would have established Exeter and Norwich as unitary authorities and prevent the implementation of the Suffolk unitary proposals. The bill was introduced in the House of Lords on 27 May 2010.

== See also ==
- History of local government in England
- Local government in England
- Earlier local government reforms:
  - 1974 structural changes to local government in England
  - 1995–1998 structural changes to local government in England
- Later local government reforms:
  - 2019–2023 structural changes to local government in England
  - Upcoming structural changes to local government in England
- History of local government districts in Durham
