= Durham and Framwelgate =

Former municipal borough in England

- Area
  - 1891: 880 acres (3.6 km^{2})
  - 1931: 1,064 acres (4.31 km^{2})
  - 1961: 4,578 acres (18.53 km^{2})
- Population
  - 1881: 14,932
  - 1931: 16,224
  - 1961: 20,514
- History
  - Created: 1836
  - Abolished: 1974
  - Succeeded by: Durham
- Status: Municipal borough, city
  - HQ: Durham

Durham and Framwelgate was a municipal borough with the status of city in County Durham, England.

The corporation of the ancient borough of Durham and Framwelgate was reformed by the Municipal Corporations Act 1835.

The borough was abolished in 1974 by the Local Government Act 1972. Its former area was merged with Brandon and Byshottles Urban District and Durham Rural District, to become the new City of Durham non-metropolitan district.
