= Barnard Castle Rural District =

Historical rural district

Coordinates: 54.545°N 1.927°W

Barnard Castle was a rural district in County Durham, England from 1894 to 1974. It was named after Barnard Castle but did not include it.

It was created in 1894 under the Local Government Act 1894 as the part of the former Teesdale rural sanitary district that was in County Durham (the rest going on to form Startforth Rural District in the North Riding of Yorkshire). In 1937 it was much expanded when a County Review Order disbanded the Auckland Rural District, transferring much of it to Barnard Castle RD.

It was abolished in 1974 under the Local Government Act 1972, the area going on to form part of the Teesdale district.
