= Durham (non-metropolitan district) =

Non-metropolitan district in England

Coordinates: 54.7815°N 1.5188°W

City of Durham
- Durham district shown within ceremonial County Durham
- Population
  - 1981: 82,174
  - 1991: 87,287
  - 2001: 87,725
- History
  - Origin: City of Durham and Framwelgate; Durham Rural District; Brandon and Byshottles Urban District
  - Created: 1974
  - Abolished: 2009
  - Succeeded by: County Durham
- Status: non-metropolitan district, borough, city
- ONS code: 20UE
- Government: Durham City Council
  - HQ: Durham

The City of Durham was, from 1974 to 2009, a non-metropolitan district of County Durham in North East England, with the status of borough and city.

== Formation ==
The district was formed on 1 April 1974 by the merger of the existing City of Durham and Framwelgate with Brandon and Byshottles Urban District and Durham Rural District. The district was abolished as part of the 2009 structural changes to local government in England.

== Durham City Council ==
The council was made up of 50 councillors elected in all-out elections every four years (last elections 2007). The last political composition was Liberal Democrat 27, Labour 15, Independent 8. The 2003 elections saw the Liberal Democrats gain overall political control of the council from Labour, benefiting from boundary changes and substantial gains in Durham's eastern suburbs. Labour had held overall control of the City Council continually since the early 1980s.

Durham City Council was abolished when the district of Durham was abolished in 2009. In 2018 a new parish council was formed, initially known as the City of Durham Parish Council, to represent the core urban area of Durham.

== Mayors ==
Mayors of the City of Durham are styled "The Right Worshipful, The Mayor of Durham". The Mayoralty is taken as a continuation of the mayoralty of the pre-1974 Durham and Framwelgate. The Mayor of Durham is entitled to an armed ceremonial bodyguard and claims to be equal fifth in civic precedence behind the Lord Mayors of London, York, Cardiff and Belfast Since the merger of the City Council into the Durham County Council unitary authority in 2009, mayoral appointments have been made by the Charter Trustees of the City of Durham (composing the Durham County Councillors with divisions within the former City of Durham district area).

=== Other civic appointments ===
Other civic appointments in the City of Durham at its merger with Durham County Council included:

- Deputy Mayor – currently Councillor Robert Wynn.
- Town Clerk – the council's chief executive.
- Recorder – the council's director of legal services.
- Chaplain – the dean of Durham Cathedral.
- Judicial Recorder (since 2005) – currently Judge Richard Lowden
- Billet Master – to be held by a senior Durham City police officer
- Pant Master – the council's director of environmental services
- Posts within the Mayoral Bodyguard
- Honorary Aldermen

== Civil parishes ==
The central area of the City of Durham (the area covered by the pre-1974 City of Durham and Framwelgate) was not parished at the time the district existed, however a civil parish called City of Durham was formed in 2018. Those parts of the district formerly part of Durham Rural District or Brandon and Byshottles Urban District are all parished. The current Brandon and Byshottles Parish Council is co-terminous with the pre-1974 UDC and has inherited some of its responsibilities (e.g. allotments).

Civil parishes in the former City of Durham district were:

- Bearpark
- Belmont
- Brancepeth
- Brandon and Byshottles
- Cassop-cum-Quarrington
- Coxhoe
- Croxdale and Hett
- Framwellgate Moor
- Kelloe
- Pittington
- Shadforth
- Sherburn
- Shincliffe
- West Rainton
- Witton Gilbert

== Abolition ==
The district was abolished as part of the 2009 structural changes to local government in England although Durham will retain its city charter through the appointment of charter trustees. All functions of principal authority local government are now administered by a unitary Durham County Council, including the appointment of the Mayor of Durham.

Proposals to create a Durham Town Council, covering the city centre and Newton Hall, were put forward in 2008. While supported by the Liberal Democrat controlled City Council, the Labour controlled County Council opposed it. Following a local consultation in 2017 a new council known as the City of Durham Parish Council came into being in 2018, with a Liberal Democrat majority.

== Durham gallery ==
Entrance to Durham Castle

Durham castle

Durham Heritage Centre (formerly Church of St. Mary-le-Bow)

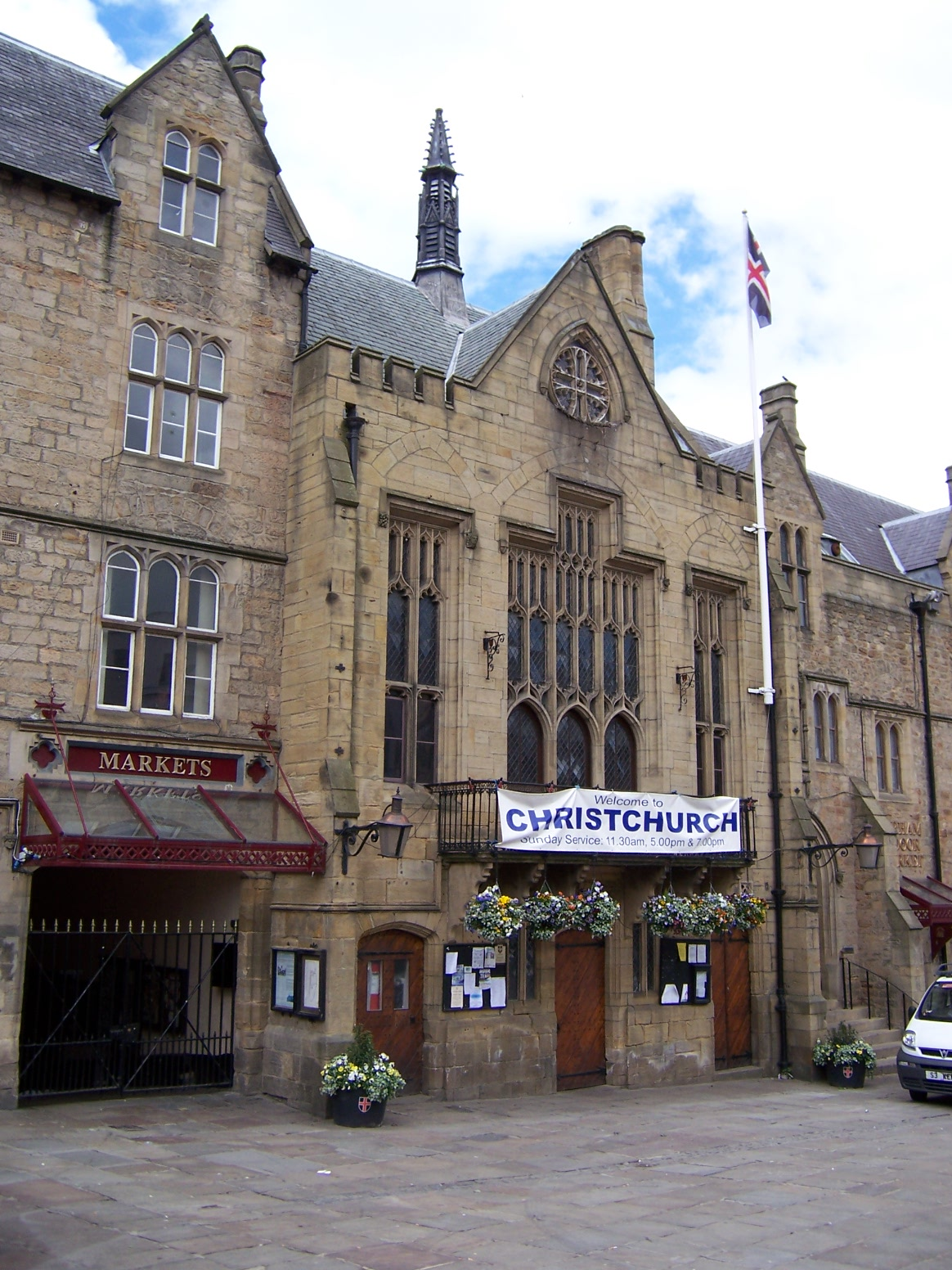
Christ Church at Market Place

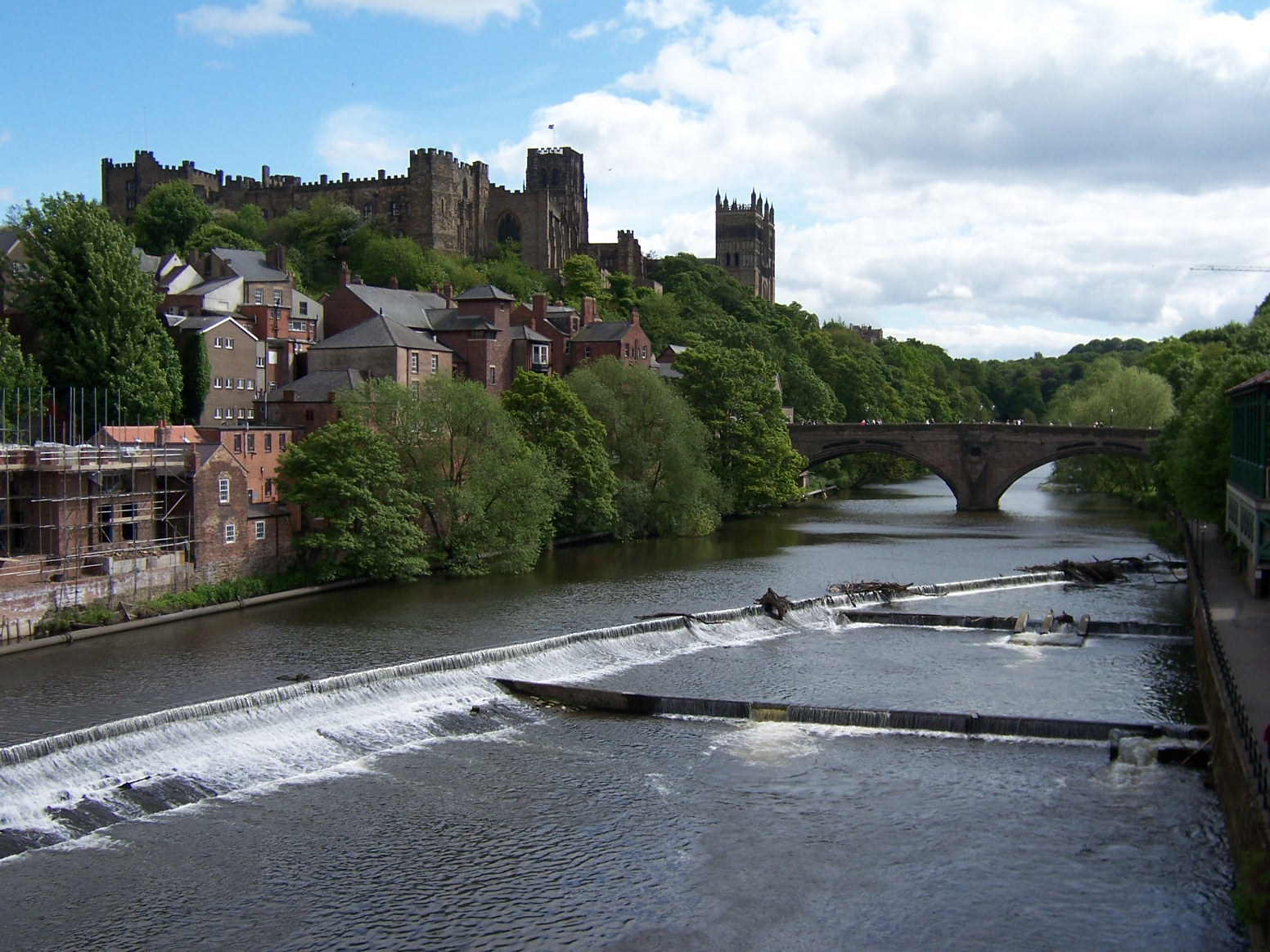
River Wear, Durham Cathedral and Durham Castle

River Wear in Durham

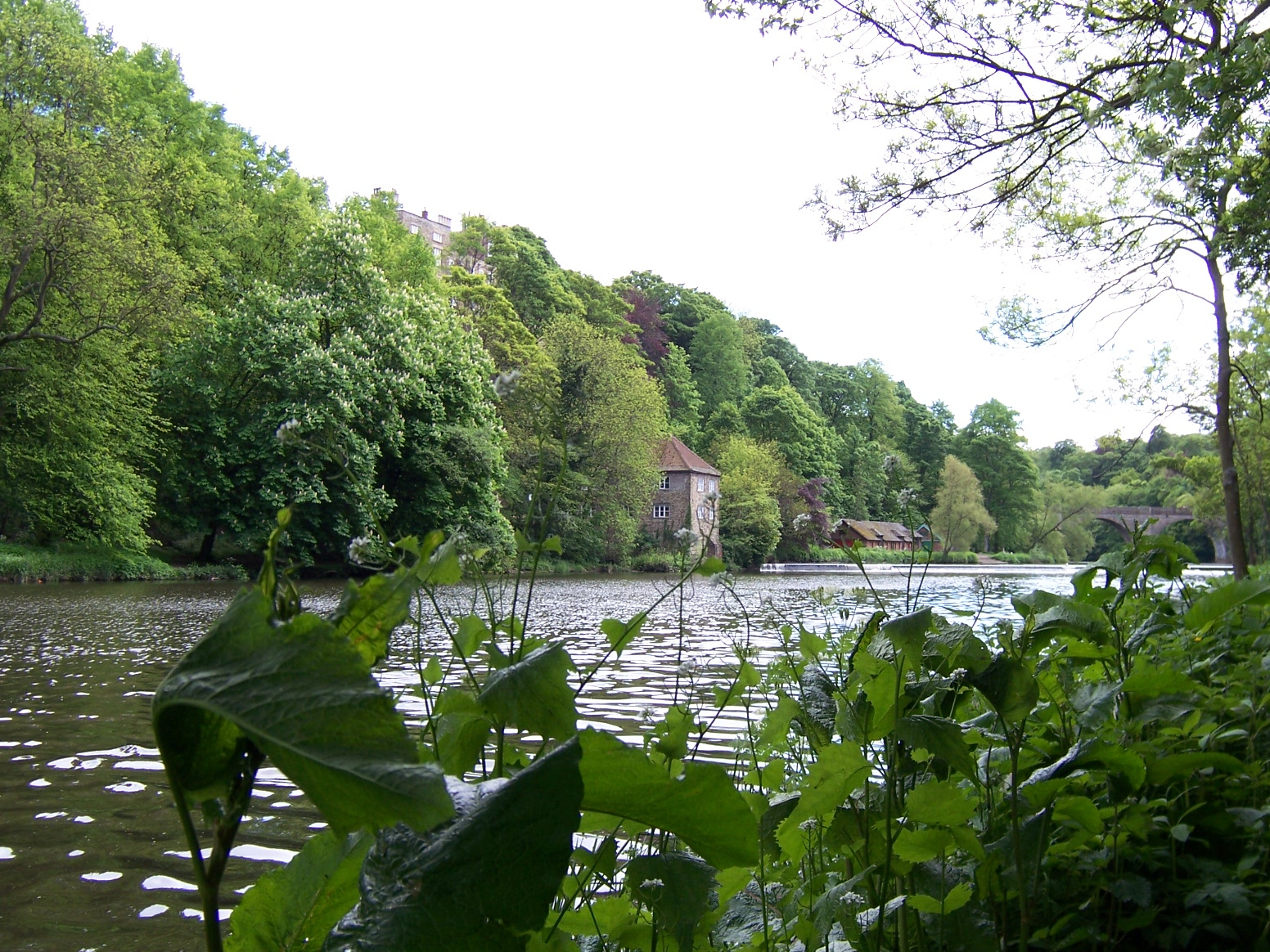
River Wear in Durham

Durham Cathedral

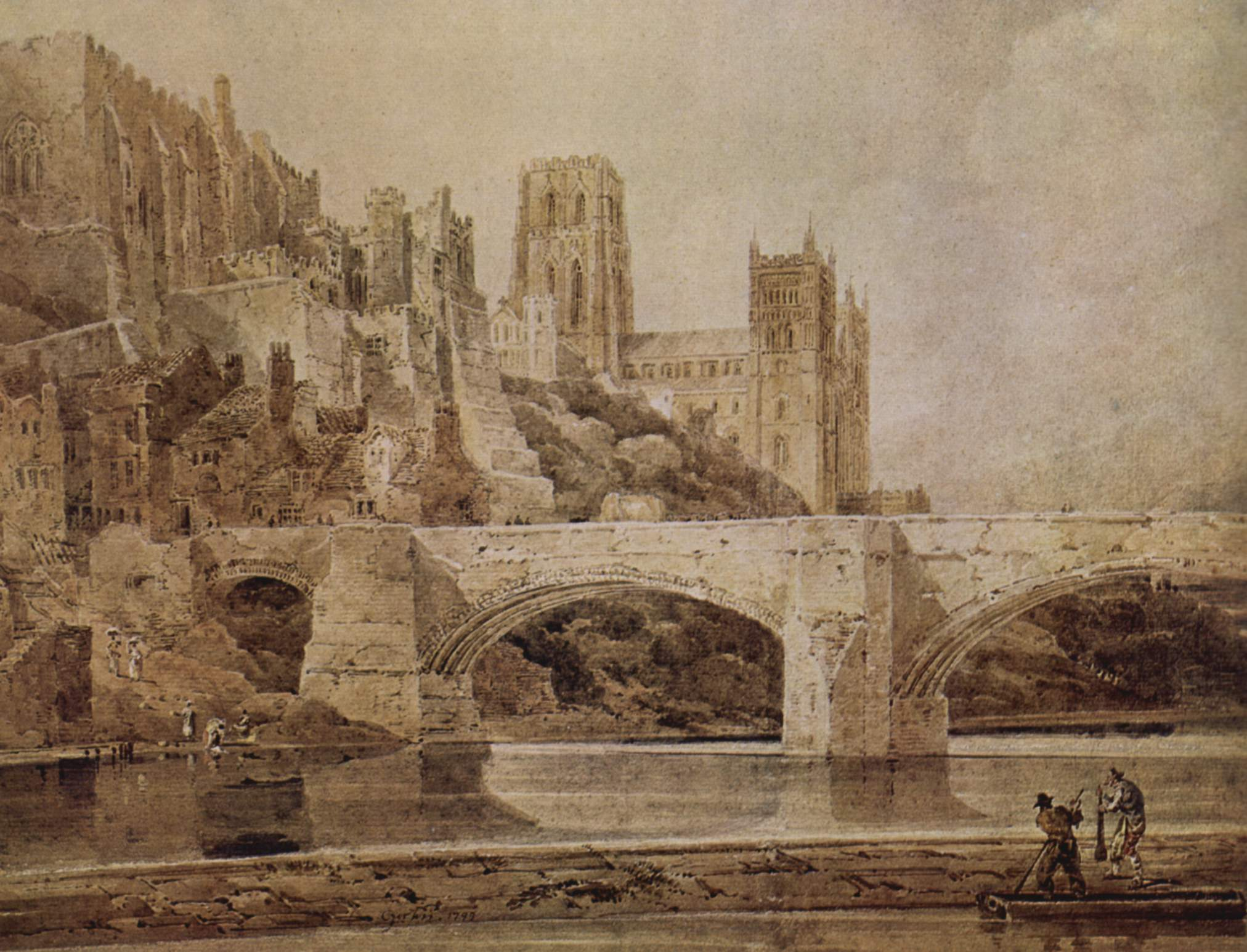
Thomas Girtin: Durham, 1799
