= Portrack Marsh Nature Reserve =

Nature reserve in County Durham, England

- IUCN category V (protected landscape/seascape)
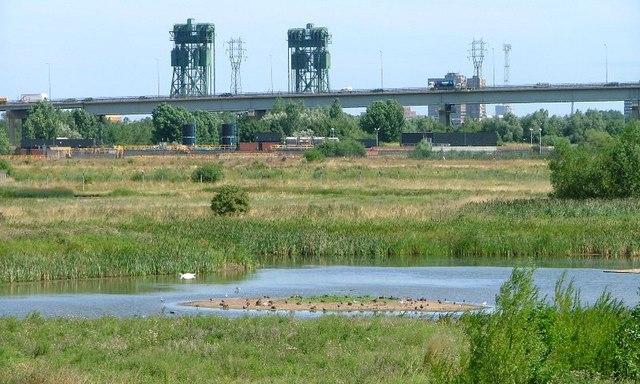
- West Water in Portrack Marsh Nature Reserve
- Interactive map of Portrack Marsh Nature Reserve
- Location: Stockton-on-Tees Borough, United Kingdom
- Coordinates: 54°34′7″N 1°16′50″W
- Area: 50 acres (20 ha)
- Operator: Tees Valley Wildlife Trust

Portrack Marsh Nature Reserve is a 50 acres (20 ha) reserve by the northern bank of the River Tees between the Tees Barrage and the Tees Viaduct, near Portrack housing estate in Stockton-on-Tees borough, County Durham. It is the last remaining wetland on the lower Tees. The site is bounded by Marston Road, a disused railway line, the Northumbrian Water's waste water treatment site, the River Tees, the Tees Barrage White Water Course, the grounds of The Talpore pub and a Tees Barrage access road.

Ownership of the reserve is split between Tees Valley Wildlife Trust and Northumbrian Water but the reserve is managed by Tees Valley Wildlife Trust. The reserve has mature marsh in the west and north, and artificial ponds make up the remaining portion. The site is at an altitude of 10 metres (33 ft) over datum.

== History ==
The land for the reserve is inside a former meander of the old River Tees. The loop was removed in 1830–31 by creating the Portrack Cut through the marshes, leaving an artificial oxbow lake, shortening the river and making it more navigable. Part of the oxbow lake of the old river bed was filled in leaving Portrack Lake but this was lost in the 1970s. Part of this land was purchased by Northumbrian Water for a water treatment works with the proviso that some of the land would be set aside and managed as a nature reserve. Tees Valley Wildlife Trust was established in 1979 and they own the western half of the reserve. In 1992 Northumbria Water created new pools in their part of the reserve.

Over the years various wildlife projects on the nature reserve have been funded by bodies such as The Environment Trust, the Heritage Lottery Fund, Northumbrian Water, and Stockton-on-Tees Borough Council.

== Landmarks ==
The reserve has a number of ponds – in the north is Mallard Water, in the east Teal Lake and by the River Tees along the southern boundary, Willow Pond, and Darter Ponds with its dipping platform, and in the western half, West Water with its islands – some ponds are relatively shallow and some deep. In the north-east and far west of the reserve are areas of grassland.

The reserve has a number of pathways around it and because of flooding some pathways are provided with a boardwalk. The level of water in the ponds also determines the type of birds present.

== Flora and fauna ==
Some 153 bird species have been recorded at this reserve with 90–100 recorded annually. Birds observed to have visited or bred here include blackcap, black-tailed godwit, bullfinch, canada goose, chiffchaff, common sandpiper, common snipe, common tern, coot, dunlin, gadwall, goldeneye, grasshopper warbler, great white egret, green sandpiper, greenshank, grey wagtail, jack snipe, kingfisher, knot, lapwing, lesser redpoll, little grebe, little ringed plover, long-eared owl, mallard, moorhen, mute swan, osprey, pochard, redshank, ringed plover, ruff, scaup, sedge warbler, short-eared owl, shoveler, reed warbler, siskin, European stonechat, Eurasian teal, tufted duck, turnstone, northern wheatear, whinchat, whitethroat, wigeon, willow warbler and wood sandpiper. Locally rare species have also visited, such as bluethroat, penduline tit, corncrake, pectoral sandpiper, ring-billed gull and spotted crake. Amphibians present on the site include the common newt.

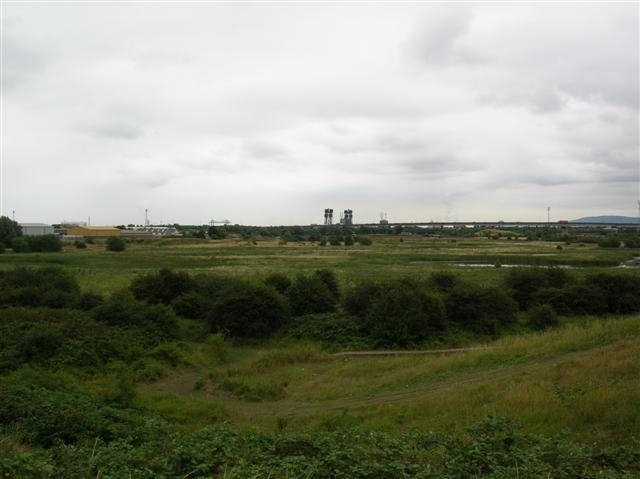
Portrack Marsh Nature Reserve

The reserve is noted for its large and varied butterfly population. Insects to be found include butterflies (common blue, dingy skipper, grayling) and dragonflies (broad-bodied chaser, lesser emperor). Weevils were successfully introduced to the ponds to control the spread of azolla pond weed.

As for mammals, urban foxes have been seen in the area and the harvest mouse was introduced to the site in a schools project along with nesting boxes but the success of the introduction is uncertain.

The plants present include alder trees, mature hawthorn bushes, some of them planted by local schools. Other plants include alsike clover, bee orchid, cornflower, Japanese honeysuckle, lucern, marsh orchid, medicago, melilot, northern marsh-orchid, wild carrot, wild parsnip and in the ponds azolla pond weed, common reed, phragmites and reedmace.
