= Maze Park Nature Reserve =

Nature reserve in Middlesbrough, England

Maze Park
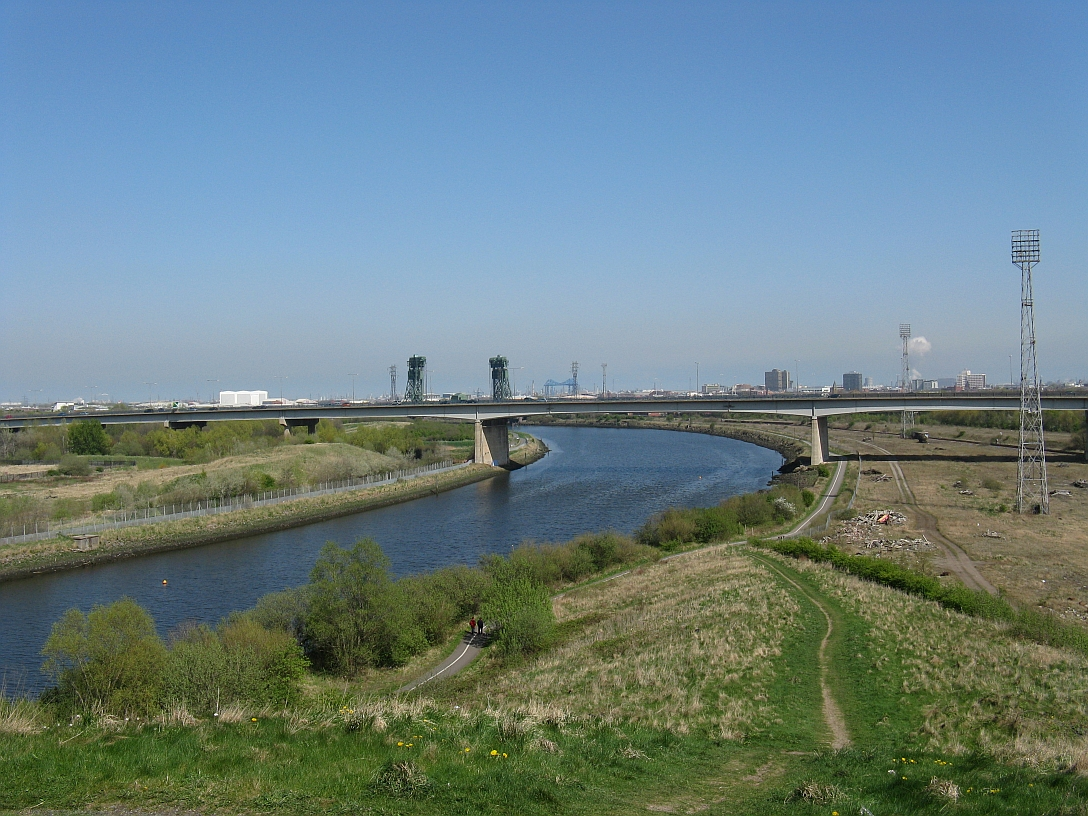
- The north-eastern end of Maze Park Nature Reserve from the viewing hill

- Location within England
- Location: Middlesbrough, England
- Coordinates: 54°33′58″N 1°16′38″W
- Area: 42 acres (17 ha)
- Operator: Tees Valley Wildlife Trust
- Website: teeswildlife.org

Maze Park is a 42-acre (17 ha) urban nature reserve in Middlesbrough, England on the south bank of the Tees on part of the former Tees Marshalling Yard. It was created by the Teesside Development Corporation and is owned and run by the Tees Valley Wildlife Trust. The reserve is a narrow triangle of land bounded by the River Tees, the old River Tees, and the Thornaby rail marshalling yards.

== Facilities ==
The area is rough grassland, supporting herbs and broad-leaved plants and has three landscaped viewing mounds giving panoramic views of the Green Blue Heart of the Tees Corridor. Passing through the reserve along the side of the River Tees is the Teesdale Way footpath and cycle route and there are butterfly styled metal cycle racks to park bicycles for those cyclists wishing to stop and take a closer look. There is also a hanging butterfly sculpture on the side of a viewing mound.

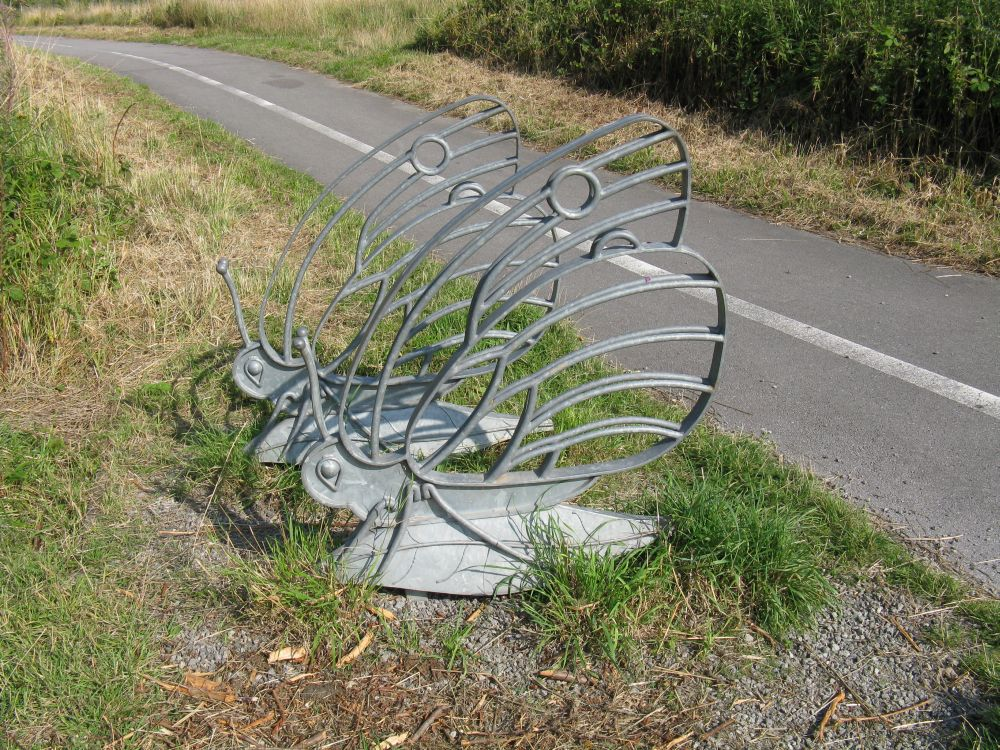
Butterfly sculpture and cycle rack

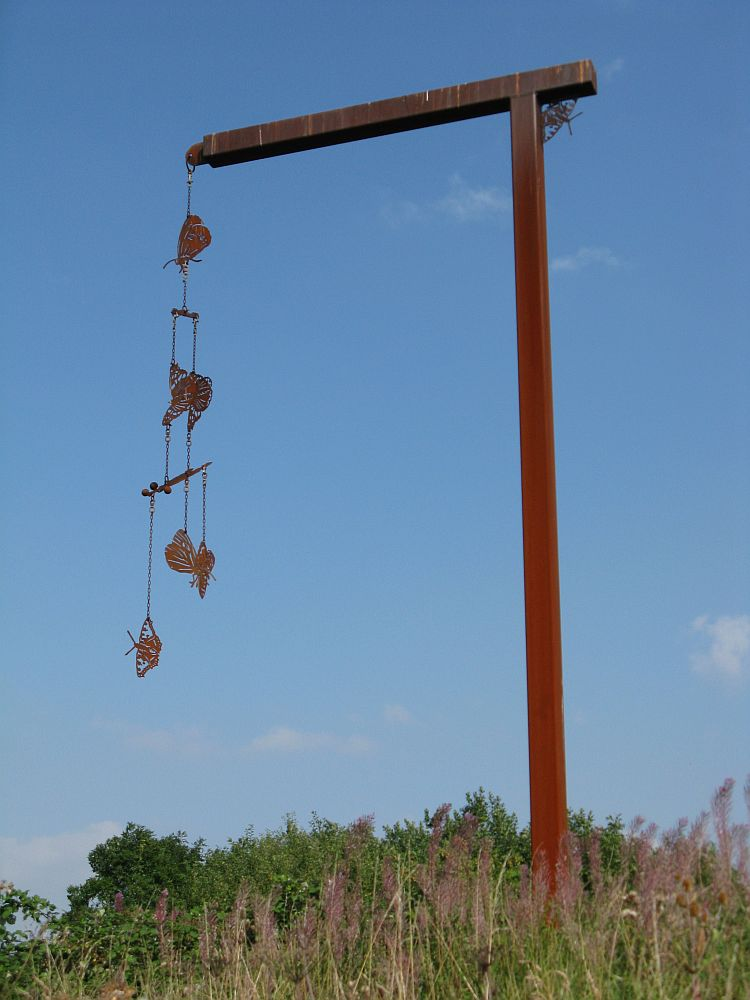
Hanging butterfly sculpture

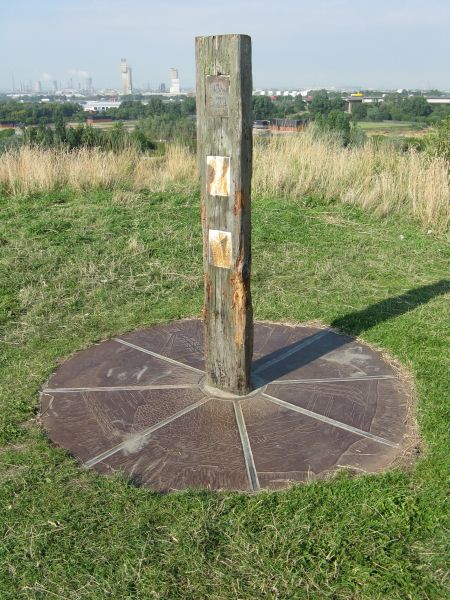
Maze Park viewing hill summit.

An interpretation panel is present for the interested visitor and others are planned. The western end of the nature reserve is close to and accessible from the Tees Barrage. Portrack Marsh Nature Reserve is located on the opposite bank of the River Tees.

== Flora and fauna ==
Maze Park Nature Reserve supports a range of plants, insects and birds. The area has a slag-based soil and is ideal for plants that grow in limestone and chalk meadows. Plants in the reserve include bird's foot trefoil, common centaury, rocket, St John's wort and yellow-wort and there was a school project to plant further wild plants such as viper's bugloss, greater knapweed, salad burnet and selfheal. Insects to be found include damselfly, dingy skipper, grasshopper, grayling, ringlet, six-spot burnet moth and small copper.

The birds which are known to nest or visit include blackcap, common chaffinch, grasshopper warbler, grey partridge, kingfisher, sand martin, skylark and sparrowhawk.

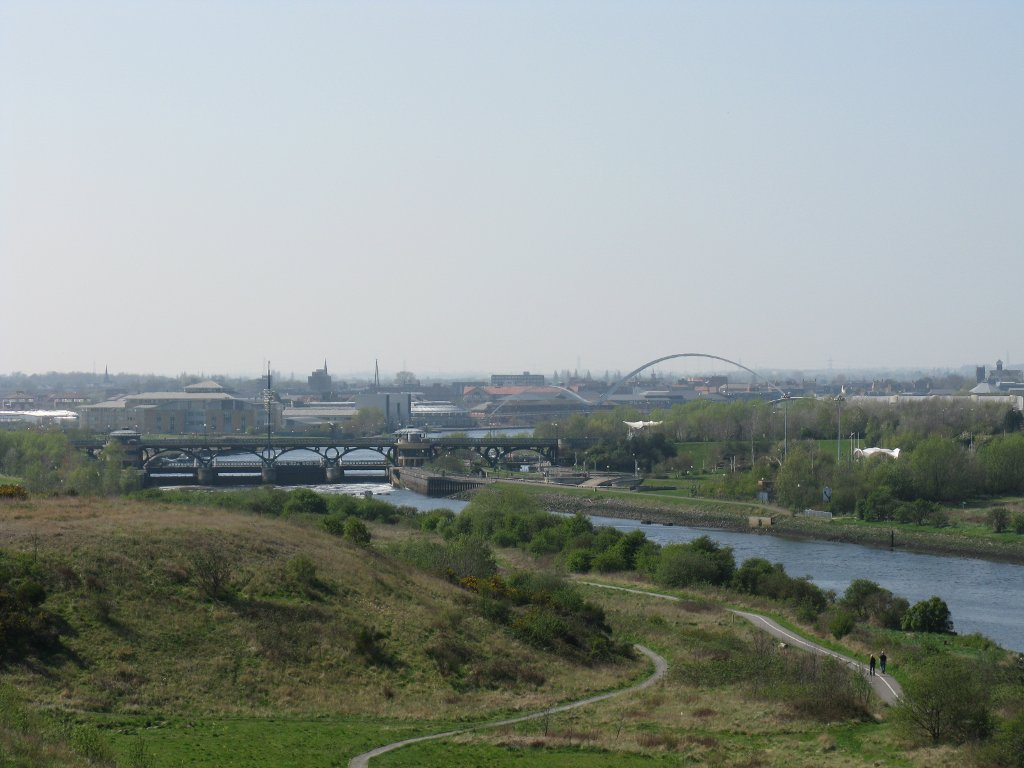
The view from Maze Park viewing hill looking west. Note the River Tees and in the distance, the Tees Barrage and Infinity Bridge
