= Portrack Incinerator =

Former waste and power plant in England

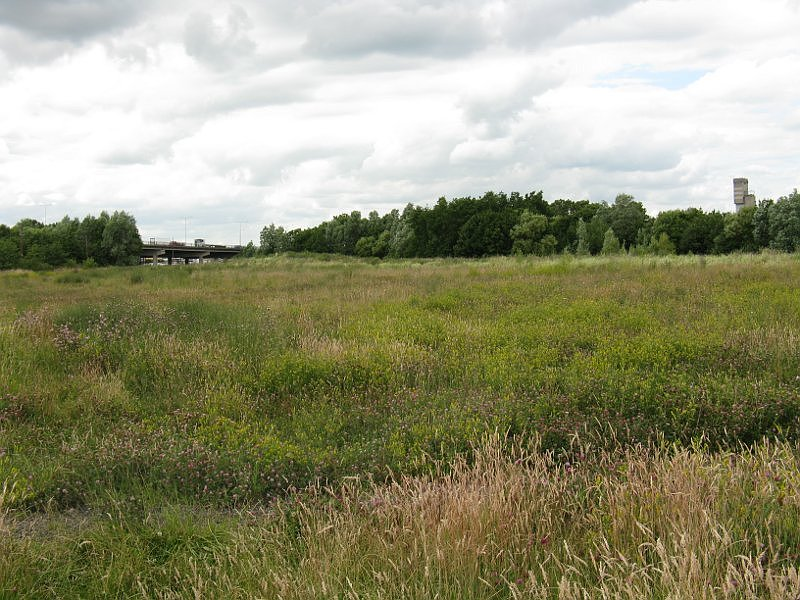
- Country: England
- Location: County Durham, North East England
- Coordinates: 54.571196°N 1.266791°W
- Commission date: 1975
- Decommission date: 1996
- Operator: Tees Valley Wildlife Trust

Thermal power station
- Primary fuel: Waste

The Portrack Incinerator was a municipal waste incinerator and waste-to-energy power station situated on the River Tees at Portrack in Stockton-on-Tees in County Durham, England.

== Incinerator history ==
The incinerator was opened in 1975 to burn the domestic waste of the four local authorities of Middlesbrough, Stockton on Tees, Redcar & Cleveland and Hartlepool. It was praised as an environmentally friendly answer to waste management on Teesside. The plant burned approximately 200,000 tonnes of waste every year and had the potential capacity to generate 20 megawatts (MW) of electricity although it never actually did so. Ash from the incinerator was sent to landfill and ferrous metal baled and sold on as scrap. During the 1980s, a former quarry at Whitton was used as a site to dump the incinerator's ash.

In the early 1990s, Northumbrian Water and Internal Technology Europe Ltd. applied for planning permission to build a sludge incinerator alongside the waste incinerator. These plans were refused, despite an appeal in 1992.

The incinerator was closed down in November 1996, after failing to meet new emission regulations. The plant was then demolished and its site cleared between 1998 and 2000. The incinerator's 300-foot (91 m) tall chimney was demolished on 14 March 1999. The budget for the demolition went into the red in early 2000. The north part of the site was used as the Stockton civic amenity dump, until it closed in December 2001.

The incinerator was superseded by the Teesside WTE Power Station a couple of miles down river at Haverton Hill.

Portrack Meadows Wildlife Reserve
- Location: Stockton-on-Tees, England
- Operator: Tees Valley Wildlife Trust
- Website: teeswildlife.org

== Portrack Meadows Wildlife Reserve ==
After the Portrack Incinerator site was cleared it was transformed into a site for recreation and wildlife and named Portrack Meadows Wildlife Reserve. The site is managed by Tees Valley Wildlife Trust who have placed several interpretation boards around the site for the visitor. At the site's blocked-off northern road entrance is a public sculpture entitled Germination (2005) commissioned by Tees Valley Wildlife.

=== Flora ===
Many trees were planted around the incinerator to screen it off, but when the site was cleared to give other plants a chance to grow, many of these trees were pollarded. After clearing the incinerator site it was planted with hedgerows, oak trees and sown with wildflower seeds. However the concrete base of the incinerator still remains under the site—a fact that may account for the extremely dense vegetation.

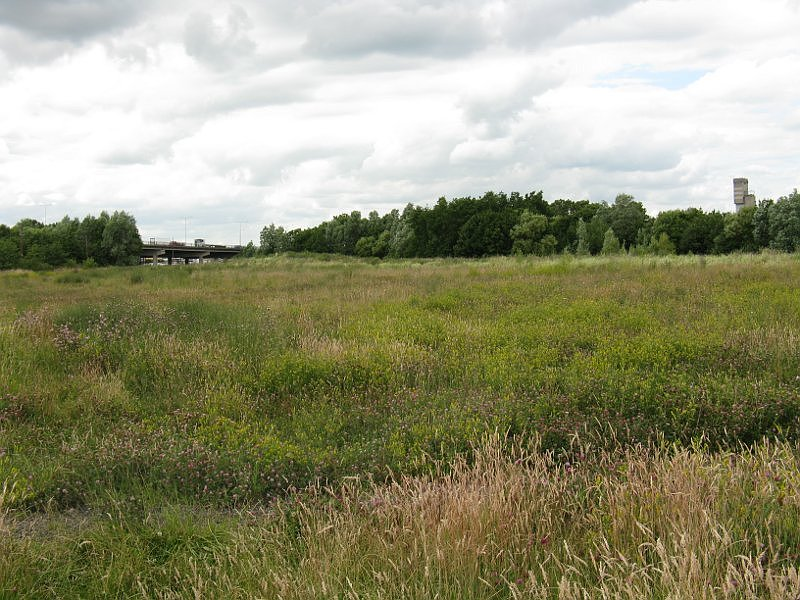
Portrack Meadows with the A19 Tees Viaduct in the distance

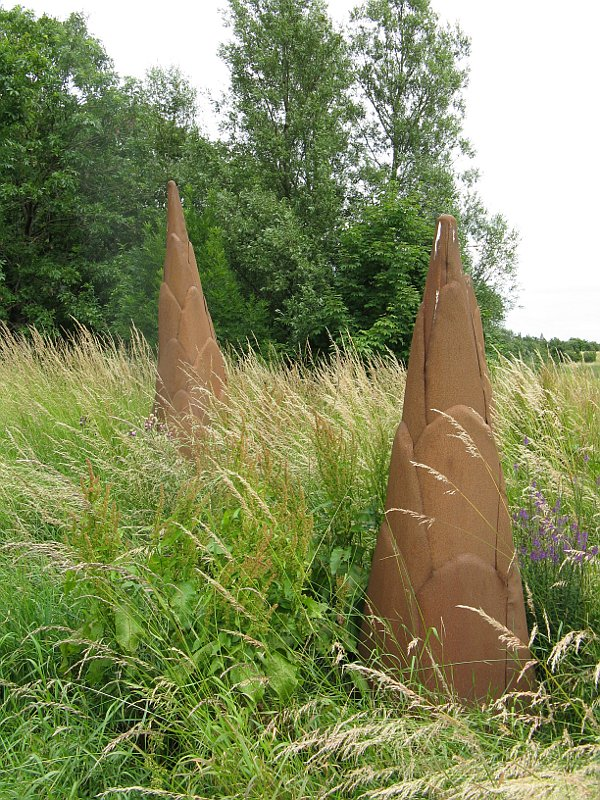
Germination sculpture at the entrance at the north end of the Portrack Meadows site
