= Teesside Park =

Leisure and shopping centre in Teesside, England

Coordinates: 54.55756°N 1.27531°W

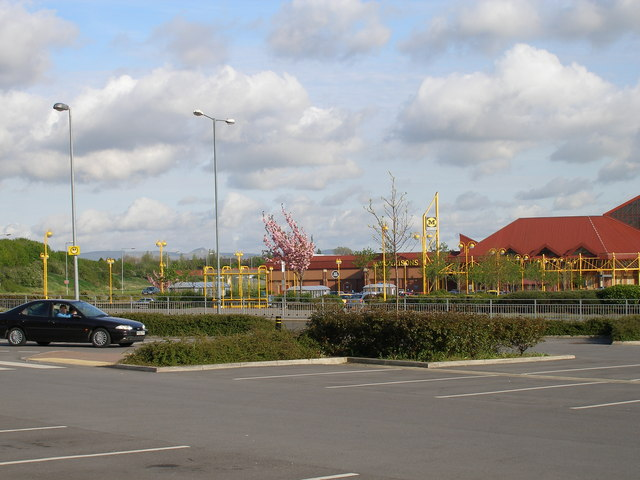
- Teesside Park retail complex, built on the site of the old Stockton Racecourse
- Location: A66 near the A66/A19 interchange
- Address: Goodwood Square, Thornaby, Stockton-on-Tees TS17 7BT
- Owner: British Land (Marylebone, City of Westminster)

Teesside Park is a retail and leisure park in Thornaby-on-Tees, built in 1988. Located just off the A66 near the A66/A19 interchange, it is split between the unitary authorities of Stockton-on-Tees (retail park) and Middlesbrough (leisure park) with the line of the Old River Tees, which runs down the middle of the development, forming the boundary between the two authorities. The development has a central building that was constructed in 2008.

== Site ==
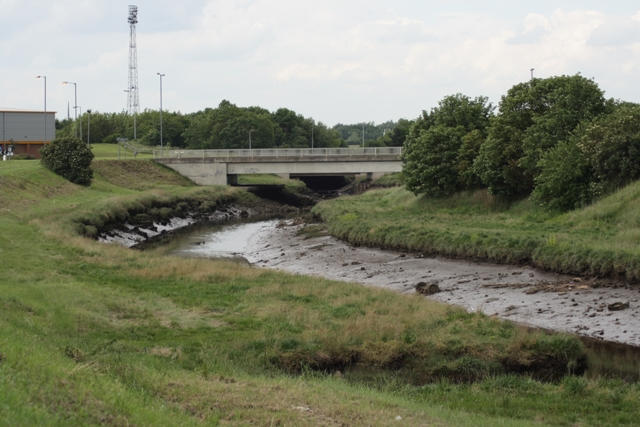
the Old-River-Tees Authority border bridge crossing from shopping park (Borough of Stockton-on-Tees) to leisure park (Middlesbrough)

The Stockton-on-Tees section is within the town of Thornaby-on-Tees and is all located within the ceremonial county of North Yorkshire. The driving force behind its growth was originally the Teesside Development Corporation in the late 1980s when the two current unitary authorities were part of the county Cleveland.

It is built on the former site of Stockton Racecourse: multiple roads in the park being named after famous racecourses such as Aintree and Goodwood. It is home to a number of retail chains and has a Morrisons supermarket. Its catchment area covers much of the Tees Valley and much of the north of North Yorkshire. There is a new development in the central car park with two new inner buildings. Construction started in March 2012. The two new units are occupied by Greggs and Market Cross Jewellers, which was formerly occupied by The Carphone Warehouse. The two new units officially opened in August 2012.

== Transport ==
Teesside Park is served by Arriva bus services between Stockton and Middlesbrough. The nearest railway station is Thornaby, where some of the services call at on their way to and from Stockton.

=== Tees Valley Metro ===
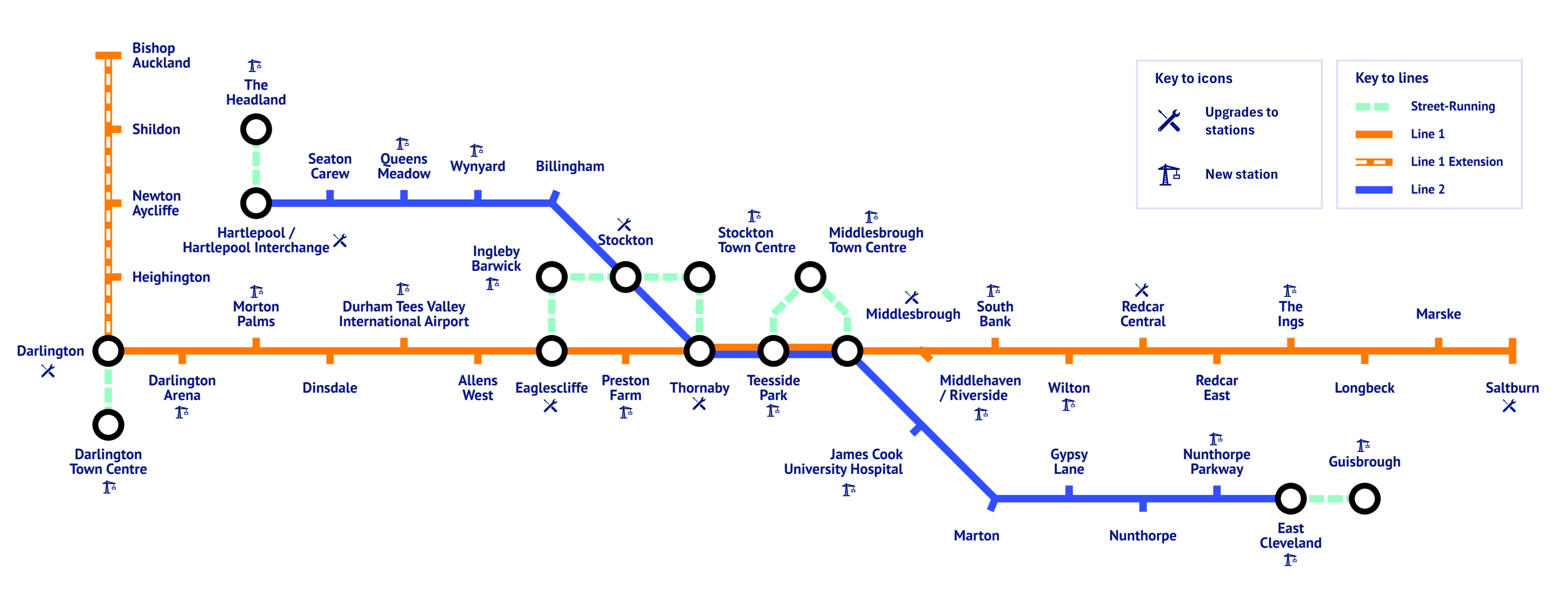
Transit diagram showcasing all discussed or mentioned ideas for the Tees Valley Metro.

Starting in 2006, Teesside Park was mentioned within the Tees Valley Metro scheme as a new possible station. This was a plan to upgrade the Tees Valley Line and sections of the Esk Valley Line and Durham Coast Line to provide a faster and more frequent service across the North East of England. In the initial phases the services would have been heavy rail mostly along existing alignments with new additional infrastructure and rollingstock. The later phase would have introduced tram-trains to allow street running and further heavy rail extensions.

As part of the scheme, Teesside Park station would have received service to Darlington and Saltburn (1–2 to 4 trains per hour) as well as to Nunthorpe and Hartlepool, possibly a street-running link to Guisborough and the Headland, and new rollingstock.

However, due to a change in government in 2010 and the 2008 financial crisis, the project was ultimately terminated. Several stations eventually got their improvements and there is a possibility of a future station being opened at Teesside Park.

=== New Station ===
In December 2023, a £150 million plan was unveiled for the creation of a Teesside Park rail and bus station and improvements to Thornaby Station. The new station would also connect with the new Care and Health Innovation Zone at the Tees Marshalling Yards.

== Leisure Park ==
The leisure park area is named Aintree Oval. The units contain:

- Burger King
- Hollywood Bowl
- Imperial City Oriental Buffet (Closed 2019)
- Pizza Hut
- Showcase Cinema De Lux
- Ninja Warrior UK, previously Amazing Grace! church (closed 2023)
- Rainbow Gala Casino (Closed 26 September 2016)
- The Academy bar (Closed 2000)
- Millennium Night Club (Closed 2002)

Until 2002, a free bus service ran from Albert Road, Middlesbrough to the leisure park in order to supply the Millenium Night Club and The Academy bar with customers.

== Shopping park ==
- JD Sports
- Boots
- Hotel Chocolat
- Nando's
- Currys
- TK Maxx
- Pro Cook
- Marks and Spencer
- Next
- Costa Coffee

== Central area ==
- Morrisons
- B&M
- McDonald's
- Costa Coffe (drive thru)

== North side of the park ==
- Barker and Stonehouse
- TGI Friday's
- Five Guys
- Tim Hortons
