= Tees Marshalling Yard =

Railway marshalling yard in Middlesbrough, England

Coordinates: 54.5598°N 1.2893°W

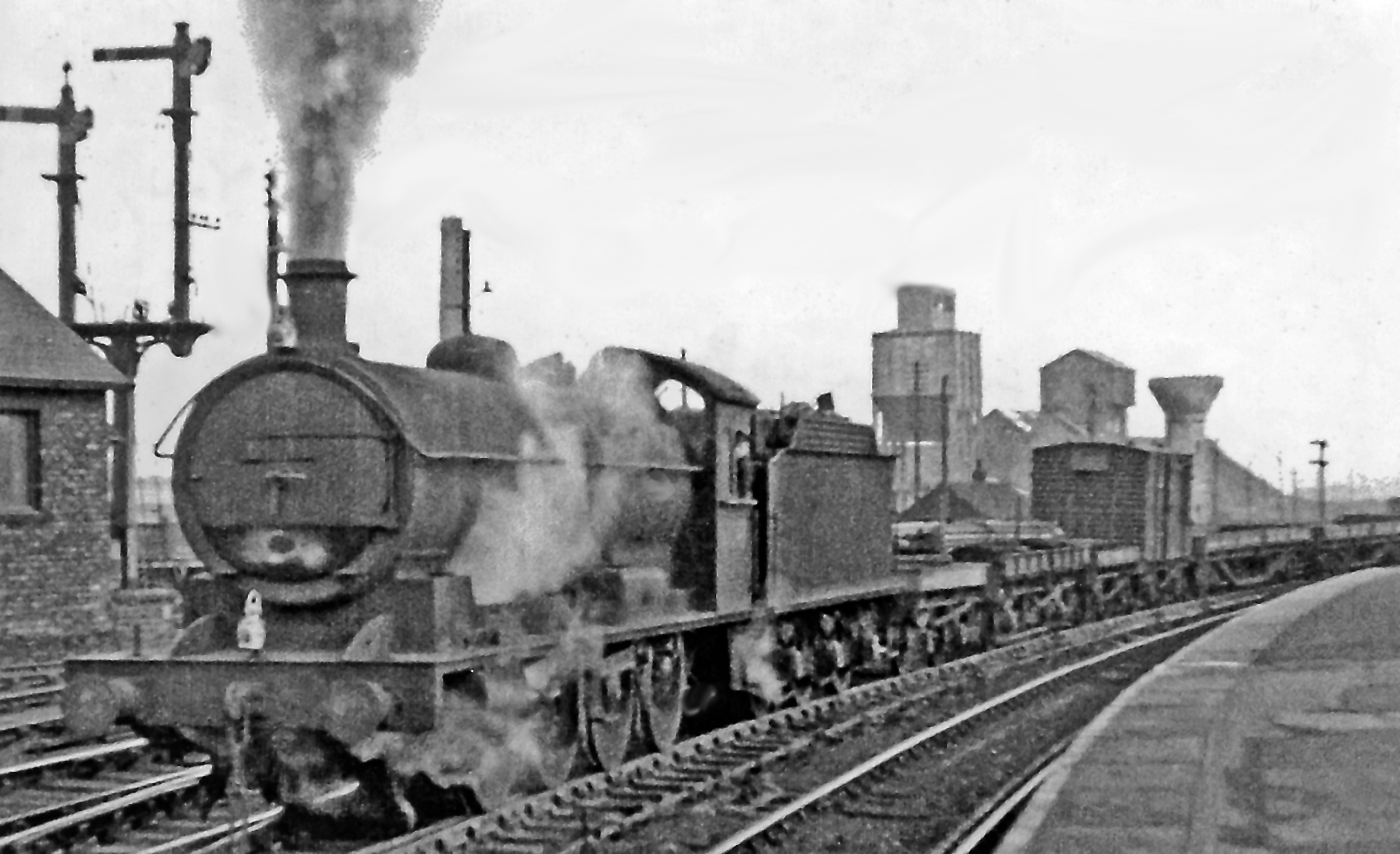
An ex-NER Class T2 0-8-0 No.63347 passes through Thornaby with a westward Class H train, consisting mainly of flat-wagons conveying steel slabs from Dorman Long. 28 March 1955, photo by Ben Brooksbank

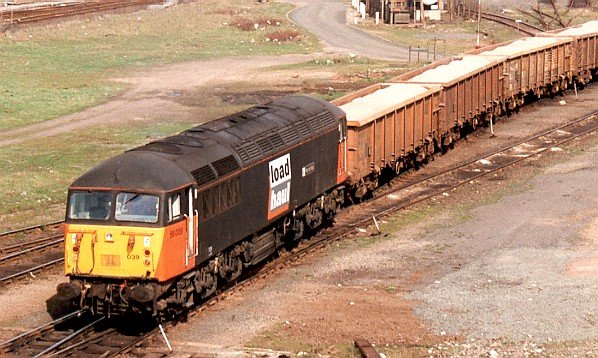
A British Rail Class 56 No.56039 in Loadhaul livery hauls a trainload of salt from Boulby into Tees Marshalling Yard, July 1998

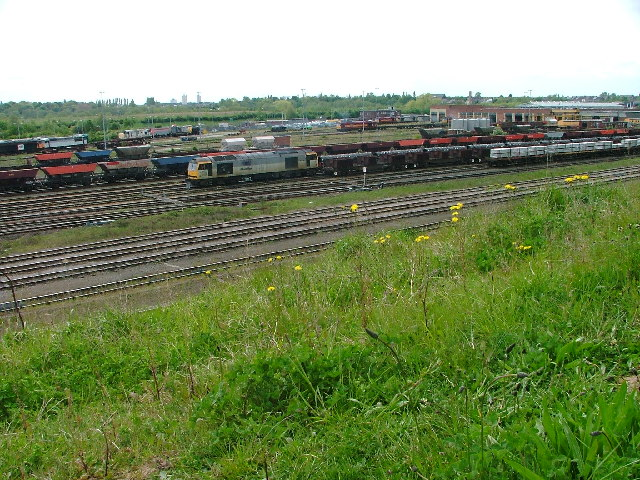
A Mainline-liveried British Rail Class 60 passes westwards through Tees Marshalling Yard with a steel stock service, May 2005. Thornaby TMD can be seen in the back of the picture

Tees Marshalling Yard is a railway marshalling yard, used to separate railway wagons, located near Middlesbrough in North Yorkshire, Northern England.

== Background ==
The yard lay on the original Stockton and Darlington Railway (S&DR) extension to Port Darlington, developed from 1828 under the instructions of influential Quaker banker, coal mine owner and S&DR shareholder Joseph Pease, who had sailed up the River Tees to find a suitable new site down river of Stockton on which to place new coal staithes. As a result, in 1829 he and a group of Quaker businessmen bought 527 acres (213 ha) of land described as "a dismal swamp", and established the Middlesbrough Estate Company. Through the company, the investors intended to develop both a new port, and a suitable town to supply its labour. On 27 December 1830, the S&DR opened an extension across the river to a station at Newport, almost directly north of the current Middlesbrough railway station. The S&DR quickly later renamed this new station and associated six-coal staithe dock facility as Port Darlington, hoping to market the facility further. So successful was the port, a year after opening the population of Port Darlington had reached 2,350.

However, with Port Darlington overwhelmed by the volume of imports and exports, in 1839 work started on Middlesbrough Dock. Laid out by Sir William Cubitt, the whole infrastructure was built by resident civil engineer George Turnbull. After three years and an expenditure of £122,000 (equivalent to £9.65m at 2011 prices), the formal opening occurred on 12 May 1842. On completion, the docks were bought by the S&DR.

== Erimus Marshalling Yard ==
As Middlesbrough developed, additional railway facilities were required to marshall goods wagons, and allow workers to access the docks and associated industries. So in 1882 South Stockton railway station was built by the North Eastern Railway, opened on 1 October. In 1892 Parliament granted a charter that created the Borough of Thornaby-on-Tees, which incorporated the village of Thornaby and South Stockton, and so on 1 November 1892 the name of the station was also changed.

Thornaby was located on a busy and hence important section of the line for the NER, between Newport and Middlesbrough Dock to the east, and Bowesfield Junction to the west, which had the busiest signal box on the NER system. In 1910, the NER hence built the new Erimus Marshalling Yard, named after the motto of Middlesbrough.

In 1914, as an early adopter of overhead line railway electrification, the NER built the Electric Freight 1 locomotives to haul coal from the Witton Park Colliery at Shildon, along the former Clarence Railway to Redmarshall and then down the Castle Eden Railway to Erimus, for export from Middlesbrough Dock. During the 1920s the coal traffic declined and some of the locomotives became surplus to requirements. The NER was grouped in 1923 as part of the London and North Eastern Railway, and by 1935 the LNER had replaced the electric locomotives with steam.

Although bombed by the Nazi Luftwaffe during World War II, the yard survived and thrived.

== Tees Marshalling Yard ==
In the mid-1950s as part of British Railways modernisation plan, projects were developed to centralise the marshalling of goods wagons and the associated servicing of steam locomotives at the UK's largest freight hubs.

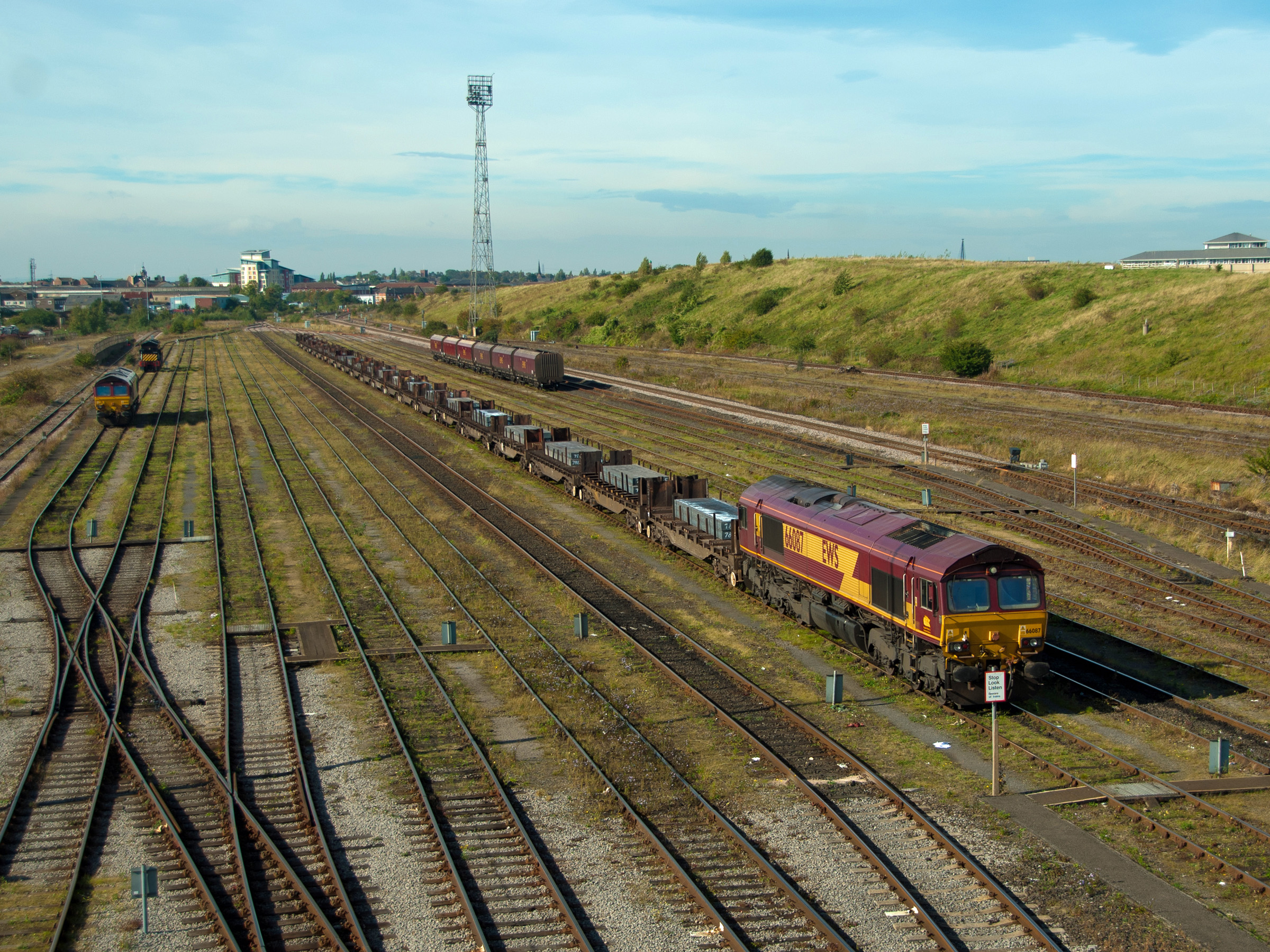
66087 in Tees Yard with a steel train from Scunthorpe for the beam mill in 2011

Teesside had a number of marshalling yards servicing the coal mines and steel mills of Consett, West County Durham and North Yorkshire, as well as those for Middlesbrough Dock. The decision was hence taken to rationalise these to one yard, and in 1957 to the immediate west of Erimus, BR developed the new Tees Marshalling Yard and associated Thornaby TMD. Initially developed as a hump shunting facility, by the time construction was completed in 1963 wagon-shunting had been replaced by containerisation and merry-go-round trains, and hence hump shunting ceased.

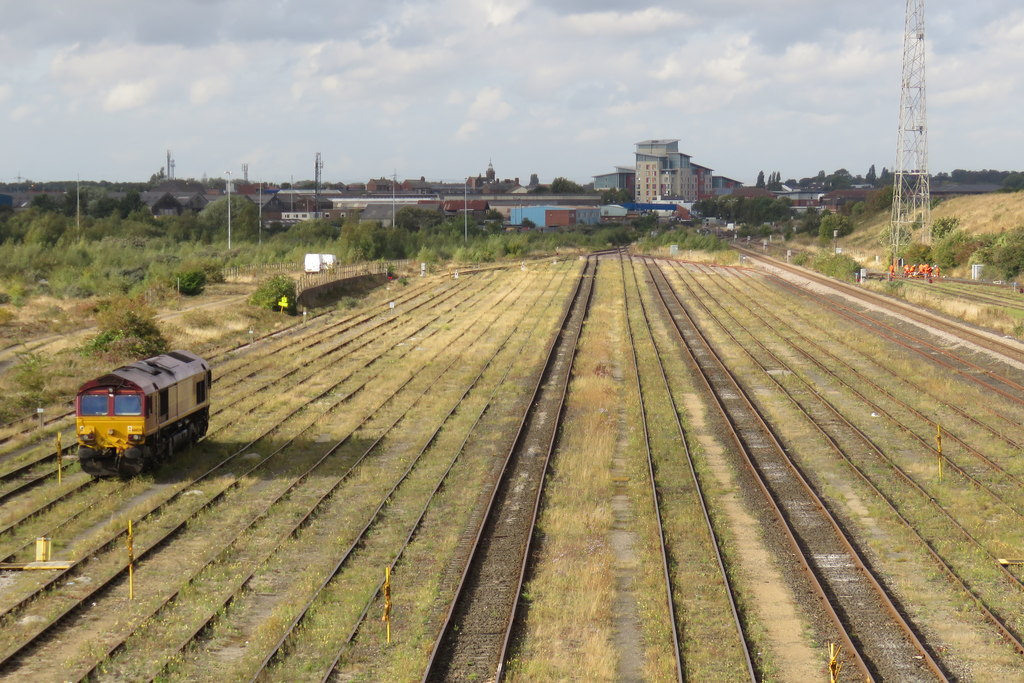
Tees Yard 2016

However, with rationalisation in the local coal mining and steel making industry – particularly the closure of Consett Steel Works in 1980 – it closed in stages from 1985 with the run-down of rail freight in the area and Great Britain in general. Taken over by EWS (English, Welsh & Scottish railways) upon the privatisation of British Rail (which then became DB Schenker Rail (UK)), with the closure of Middlesbrough Dock in 1980 and the development of Teesport further down stream, Thornaby became isolated from its main source of traffic.

The Down Yard is completely closed apart from the Down Staging sidings which remain open to all freight operators. The Up yard remains busy to this day shunting traffic for the nearby steel works and as an intermediary point for long distance flows. The Yard consists of Arrivals and Departures at the Thornaby end, numbered 1 to 5 for the Departures and 6 to 12 for the arrivals. There is then a shunt neck leading to 42 Primary sorting sidings. There is a small group of sidings called the Sectional Sidings which are used for wagon Maintenance and Locomotive Servicing. Thornaby Depot closed in 2008 and was demolished in 2011. Most of the track has been lifted, however the old Ash pits are used for wagon storage and there are some sidings to the south called the New Sidings which are used for the storage and maintenance of Tamping machines.

== Present ==
Part of the site has been redeveloped as the 42-acre (17 ha) Maze Park Nature Reserve. Created by the Teesside Development Corporation, the reserve is a narrow triangle of land bounded by the River Tees, the old river Tees, and the former rail marshalling yard, owned and run by the Tees Valley Wildlife Trust.

Middlesbrough Council have the rest of the site marked for long term redevelopment, subject to the mainline railways being moved west on the site, and accepting the fact that the site is within a zone 2 flood risk area.
