= Tees Newport Bridge =

Bridge over the River Tees, northern England

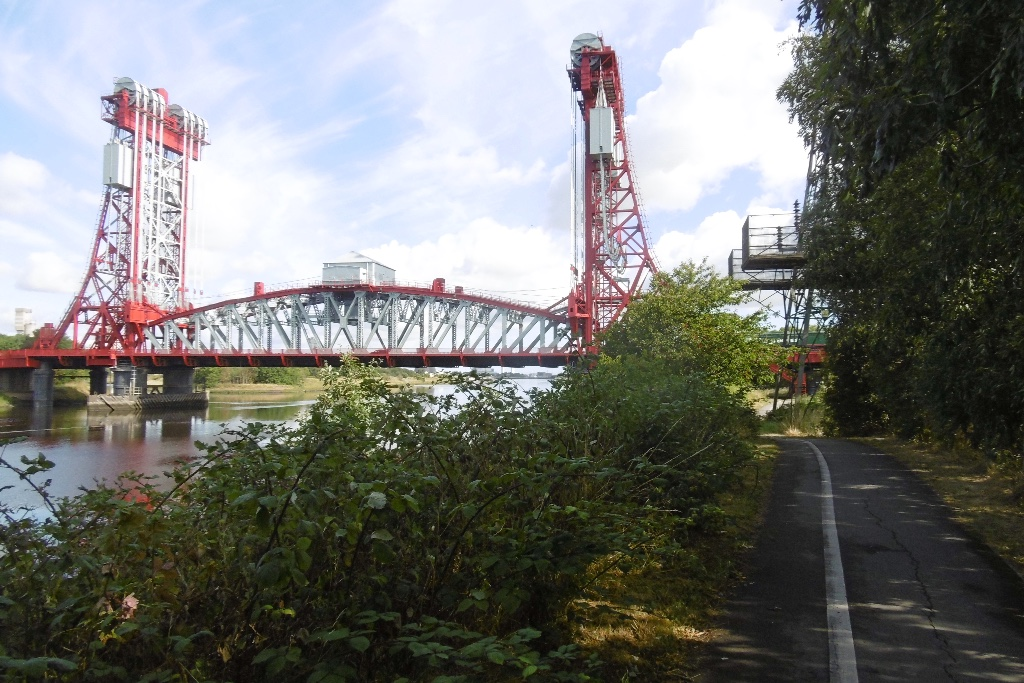
- Tees Newport Bridge
- Coordinates: 54°34′18.73″N 1°15′40.9″W
- Carries: Motor vehicles, A1032 road
- Crosses: River Tees and railway line
- Locale: Middlesbrough, England
- Preceded by: Tees Viaduct
- Followed by: Tees Transporter Bridge

Characteristics
- Design: vertical-lift
- Material: Steel, concrete
- Longest span: 82 m (269 ft)
- No. of spans: 9
- Piers in water: 2

History
- Designer: Mott, Hay and Anderson
- Contracted lead designer: David Anderson
- Constructed by: Dorman Long
- Opened: 28 February 1934

Listed Building – Grade II
- Official name: Newport Bridge
- Designated: 28 July 1988
- Reference no.: 1139837

Location
- Interactive map of Tees Newport Bridge

The Tees Newport Bridge is a vertical-lift bridge spanning the River Tees a short distance upriver from Tees Transporter Bridge, linking Middlesbrough with the borough of Stockton-on-Tees, Northern England. It no longer lifts, but still acts as a road bridge in its permanently down position.

== Design ==
Designed by Mott, Hay and Anderson and built by local company Dorman Long, who have also been responsible for such structures as the Tyne Bridge and Sydney Harbour Bridge, it was the first large vertical-lift bridge in Britain.

Constructed around twin 55 m (180 ft) lifting towers, the 82 m (269 ft) bridge span, weighing 2,700 tonnes, could be lifted by the use of two 325 H.P. electric motors at 16 m (52 ft) per minute to a maximum height of 37 m (121 ft). In the event of motor failure a standby 450 H.P. petrol engine could be employed to move the bridge, but should both systems fail it was possible to raise or lower the span manually using a winch mechanism. It was estimated in 1963 by Mr R. Batty, long time Bridge Master at Newport Bridge, that "it would take 12 men eight hours" to complete the movement by hand.

== Opening and operation ==
The bridge was inaugurated by Prince Albert, Duke of York (later King George VI) and opened to traffic on 28 February 1934.

Originally, 12 men would have been employed to man the bridge around the clock, usually requiring four to drive it at any one time. This was accomplished from the oak-panelled winding house situated midway along the bridge span. During the 1940s and early 1950s this would occur up to twice a day with an average of 800 vessels per year passing under it, despite staffing difficulties during the 1940s when men were away fighting. However, as the number of ships needing to sail up to Stockton-on-Tees declined, so did the usage of the bridge.

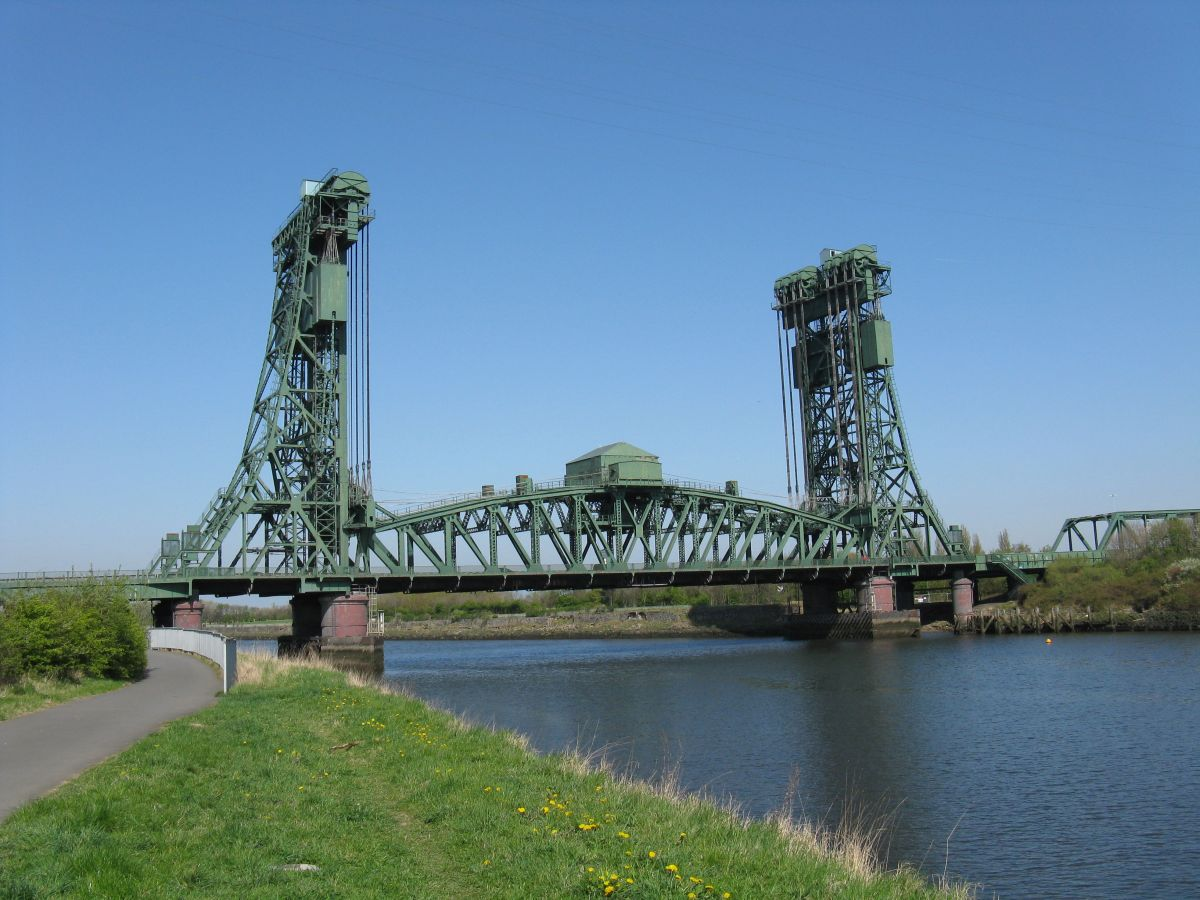
The bridge when it was formerly painted green

Tees (Newport) Bridge Act 1989
- Act of Parliament
- Parliament of the United Kingdom
- Long title: An Act to remove the obligation of Cleveland County Council to provide for the opening for vessels of the Tees (Newport) bridge; and for connected and other purposes.
- Citation: 1989 c. vii

Dates
- Royal assent: 3 July 1989

Text of statute as originally enacted

The legal requirement to lift the bridge for shipping traffic, included in the Teesside Corporation Act 1971 (c. xvii), was removed by the Tees (Newport) Bridge Act 1989 (c. vii). Before mechanical decommissioning Mr Ian MacDonald, who worked on the bridge from 1966, finally as Bridge Master, supervised the final lift on 18 November 1990.

The Tees Newport Bridge still serves as a road bridge, carrying considerable traffic as a section of the A1032, despite the presence of the A19 Tees Viaduct a short distance upriver. In recent years it was repainted in its original green and some minor maintenance took place on the wire ropes and counterbalances which still take the majority of the bridge load. In 1988 the bridge was given Grade II Listed Building status.

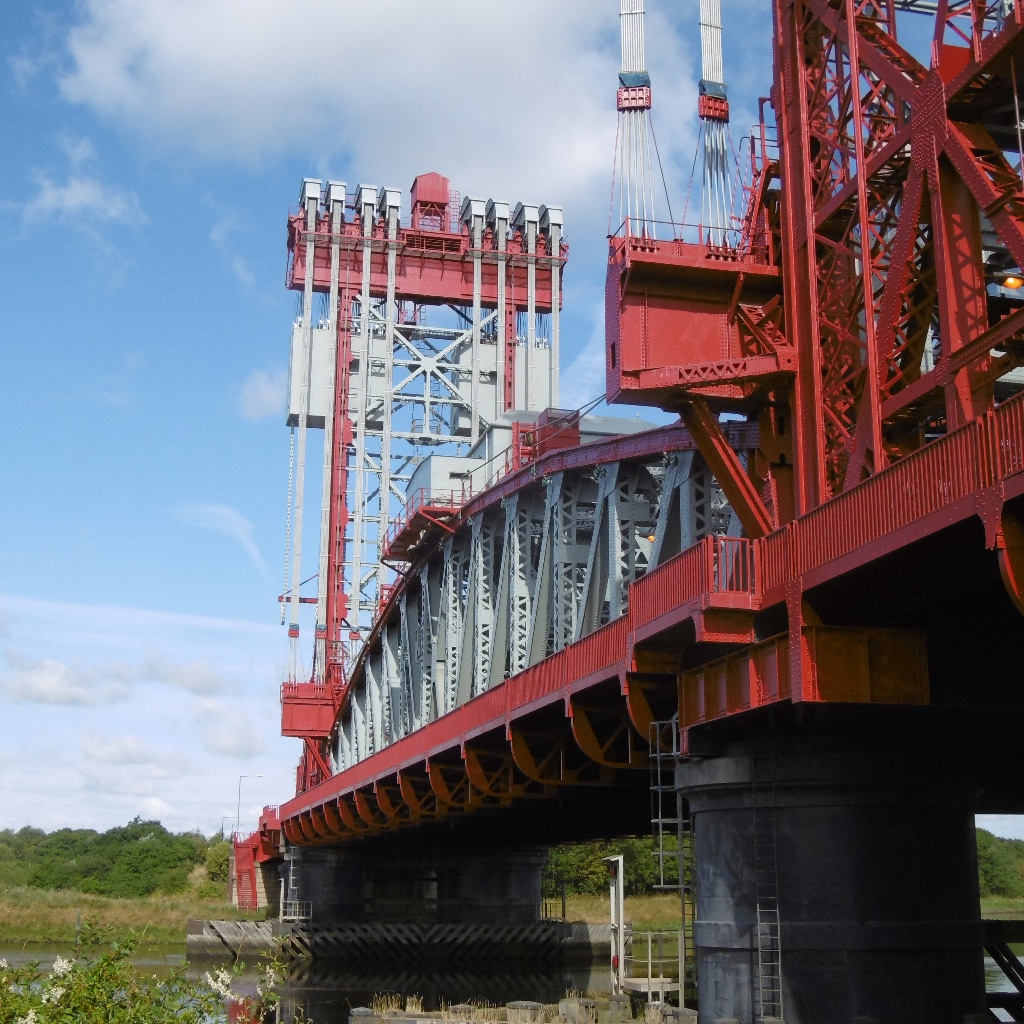
The bridge in red and silver

In July 2014, work started to paint the bridge red and silver to mark its 80th anniversary. This was planned to take six weeks but was completed behind schedule and over budget mainly because of the poor condition of the steelwork, the result of lack of maintenance.

Additional maintenance works were undertaken by Balfour Beatty in the summer of 2024 and 2025 to replace two of the main span bearings and installation of new crash barriers for safety, which has necessitated reducing the number of carriageway lanes from two to one across the bridge from Middlesbrough to Stockton, as well as updating road markings.

As ships dock on the banks of the River Tees up to the Tees Newport Bridge the Admiralty publishes tide times for the bridge location.

== See also ==
- List of bridges in England for other notable bridges

Next crossing upstream	Tees	Next crossing downstream
the Flyover	Tees Newport Bridge; Grid reference NZ4785419876	the Transporter
