= Portrack =

Area of Stockton, County Durham, England

Coordinates: 54.571738°N 1.300691°W

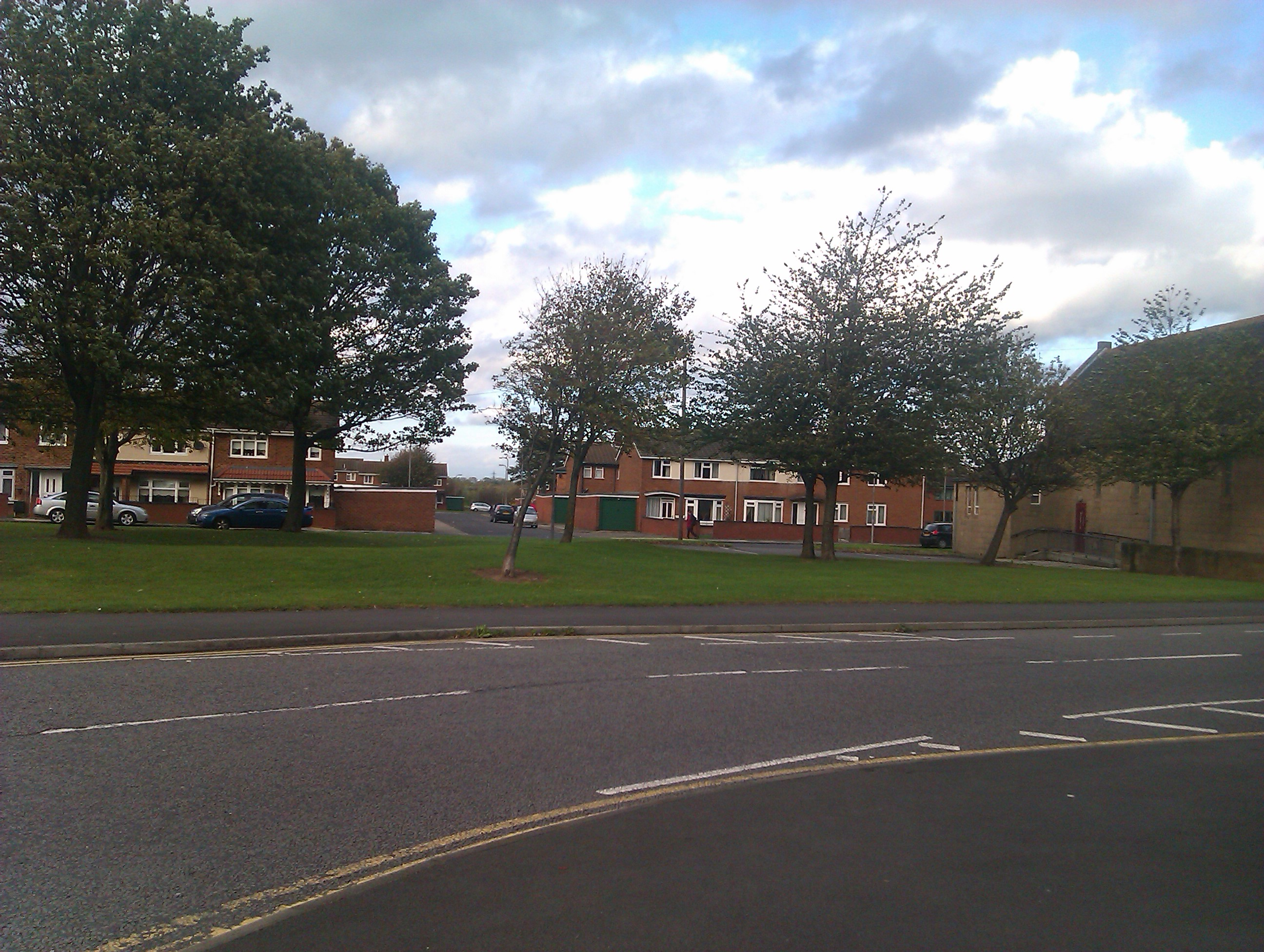

- Location within County Durham
- OS grid reference: NZ461195
- Unitary authority: Stockton-on-Tees
- Ceremonial county: County Durham
- Region: North East
- Country: England
- Sovereign state: United Kingdom
- Post town: STOCKTON-ON-TEES
- Postcode district: TS18
- Police: Cleveland
- Fire: Cleveland
- Ambulance: North East

Portrack is an east Stockton area in the borough of Stockton-on-Tees, County Durham, England. It is close to Billingham opposite Thornaby and just west of Middlesbrough. The area is a large industrial and business part of Stockton, these are mainly centred on Portrack Lane.

Stockton Cricket Club once played at the now former Portrack Lane cricket ground. It was home to a number of pubs such as the Prince of Wales, the Portrack Social Club known locally as the Blood Tub, the Cricketers Arms and the Royal Hotel which have all since closed. The only pub left in the area is the Portrack Hotel.

== History ==
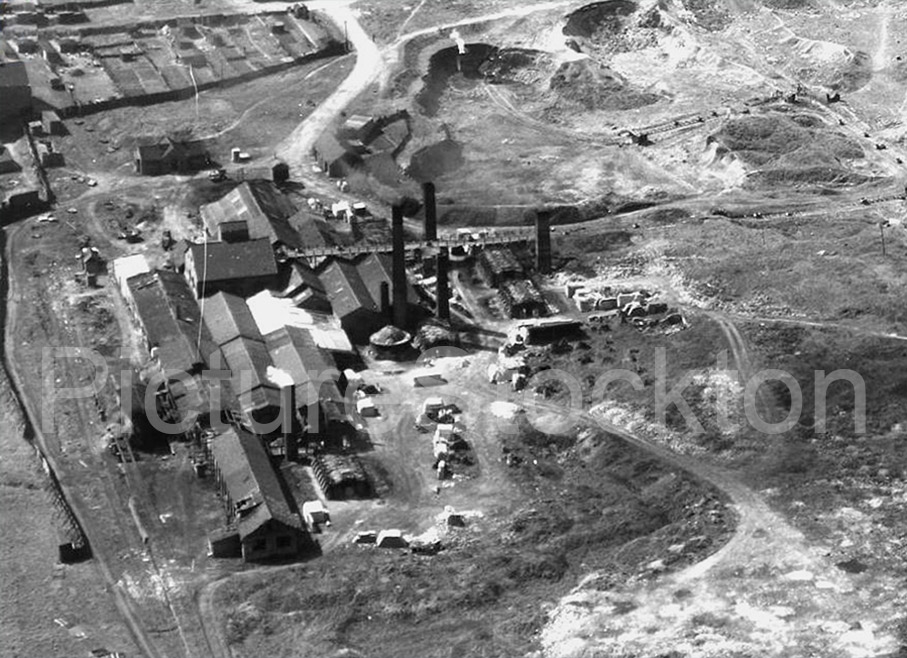
Blackett's Brickworks

The Portrack Marshes part of the area was once south of the River Tees, as part of the Portrack Cut.

It was the site of a large municipal incinerator which took in and burned waste from across Teesside. The incinerator was closed in 1996 and demolished in 1999 and 2000.

In 1892 Portrack was the site of several clay pits. The local Blackett's Brickworks used clay from the clay pits.

== See also ==
- Tees Barrage
- HM Prison Holme House
