= Teesside EfW =

Power station in Billingham, UK

Teesside Energy-from-Waste plant
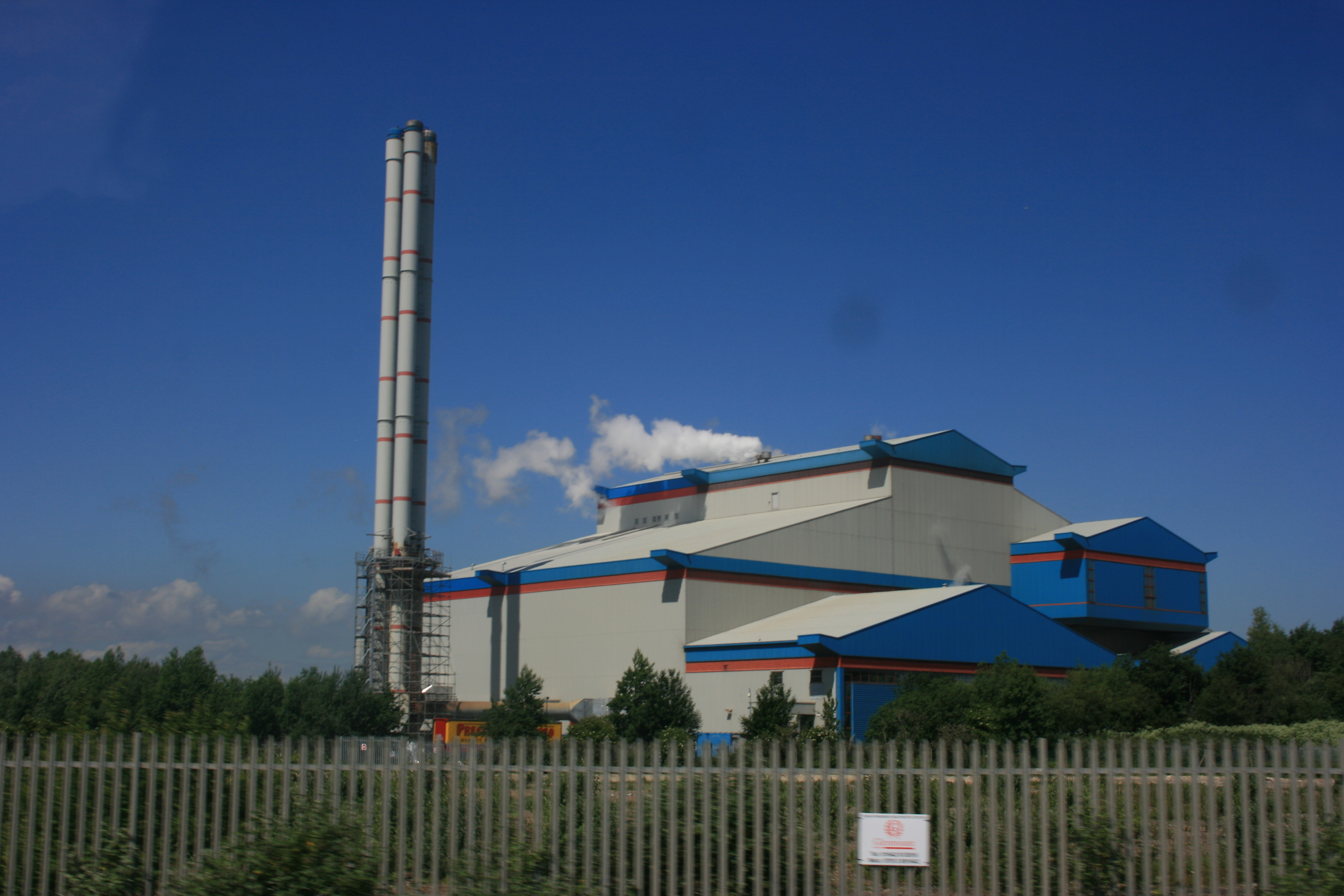
- Teesside EfW plant Viewed from the east in June 2009
- Country: England
- Location: Billingham
- Coordinates: 54°35′45″N 1°15′30″W
- Status: Operational
- Commission date: May 1998
- Operators: SITA UK (1998–present)

Thermal power station
- Primary fuel: Municipal waste
- Secondary fuel: Non-hazardous and commercial waste

Power generation
- Units operational: One 19.2 MW Ansaldo; One 10 MW Von Roll
- Nameplate capacity: 29.2 MW

External links
- Website: SITA UK
- Commons: Related media on Commons

Teesside Energy from Waste plant (also known as Teesside WTE power station or Haverton Hill incinerator) is a municipal waste incinerator and waste-to-energy power station, which provides 29.2 megawatts (MW) of electricity for the National Grid by burning 390,000 tonnes of household and commercial waste a year. It is located on the River Tees at Haverton Hill, east of Billingham in North East England. Developed and built by NEM, a subsidiary of Northumbrian Water, the initial plant replaced the Portrack Incinerator and opened in 1998. Subsequently, the facility became part of SITA, now Suez.

The station is one of the most modern incinerators operating in England; it is noted for its innovative operation. In 2009, an extension was completed at the station, with the construction of an extra furnace line and a rail head. This increased the capacities of the plant from 19.2 MW and 250,000 tonnes of waste per year to its current levels. The plant initially received waste from Teesside and North Tyneside, but this was extended to include Northumberland with the 2009 extension.

A second plant, the North East Energy Recovery Centre (NEERC), has been built on land adjacent to the first plant. This extends the site's catchment to include waste from south Tyne and Wear.

== History ==
=== Replacement for Portrack ===
Between 1975 and 1996, the Portrack Incinerator on the River Tees burned 200,000 tonnes of Teesside's waste every year. In November 1996, the plant was closed down because its design meant it could not achieve the new emission regulations that were to be introduced; it was then demolished in stages between 1998 and 2000. Following the closure of the Portrack plant, a new facility to burn Teesside's refuse was constructed. Teesside Energy from Waste plant was opened in May 1998 as a collaboration with the local authorities of Stockton-on-Tees, Middlesbrough, Hartlepool and Redcar & Cleveland.

=== Third incineration line ===
In December 2006, SITA UK signed a 28-year private finance initiative contract worth £70 million with Northumberland County Council, to provide it with waste management services and to reduce the county's reliance upon landfill. This included the construction of an extra incineration line at the Teesside plant. Civil construction of the extension began in April 2007, with heavy erection beginning that November. Von Roll was the general contractor for the entire extension. In May 2009, the third line, was brought into operation. It was officially opened on 8 October 2009 by former MP Hilary Armstrong, SITA UK Chief Executive David Palmer-Jones, and Northumberland County Councillor Jeff Reid. At various times, between 60 and 100 people were employed in building the third line, and an additional 20 full-time jobs were created for its operation once open. Built on time and within budget, the extension surpassed expectations in its first year of operation. A year after the opening of the third line, only a fifth of the amount of waste that was being sent to landfill in Northumberland prior to its opening was still being sent there.

== Design and specification ==
The plant is a large metal-clad building. The metal is finished in the colour 'Goosewing Grey', accented in 'Solent Blue' and 'Poppy Red'. The plant's clean, clear lines and colours are said to "contrast favourably" with the nearby industrial buildings.

Until 2009, the station had two operating furnace lines, which together were capable of burning a total of 250,000 tonnes of waste per year, and generated 20 MW of electricity. However, in May 2009 a third line was brought into operation. The plant currently burns 360,000 tonnes of waste a year and generates 29.2 MW of electricity. This is enough electricity to power 60,000 homes.

The original plant uses Babcock & Wilcox Volund boilers to provide steam for a single Ansaldo turbo generator rated at 19.2 MW. The third line uses a Von Roll Inova reciprocating grate to burn the waste, and generates electricity using a single Von Roll Inova three-pass steam generator, rated at 10 MW.

== Operations ==
The station operates constantly, burning municipal household waste from the local councils of Stockton-on-Tees, Hartlepool, Middlesbrough, Redcar & Cleveland, North Tyneside and Northumberland. When there is a shortfall in household waste, non-hazardous industrial and commercial waste is used to make up capacity. The station burns only residual waste, which is material left over after recycling. The incinerator operates 24 hours a day, seven days a week.

Waste is delivered to the station by road, using up to 100 waste collection vehicles. More than 1,000 tonnes of waste a day is delivered to the plant. A rail head was also built on the railway sidings adjacent to the site in 2009. This allows for waste to be delivered to the plant by rail, rather than just by road. This is more sustainable as it reduces the amount of traffic on local roads. Which has to this day not happened, waste is still delivered by road and has damaged local roads. In December 2011, it was proposed the rail head would be used to receive up 500,000 tonnes of residual waste per year from Merseyside via a rail waste transfer facility at Knowsley Industrial Park, Kirkby, in a contract worth £400 million. That instead was not taken forward as the solution, instead a new EFW was built in 2013 at Wilton 11, with that Merseyside tonnage instead being sent to that by rail - to this day, waste still arrives by road and not by rail at Haverton Hill as the train tracks have never been fully operational.

Waste arriving at the plant is checked in and weighed, before being delivered to the plant's reception hall. The large reception hall allows the vehicles to dump their waste safely. Air for the combustion of the waste later in the plant is drawn from the reception hall so that odour and dust doesn't escape the building. From the hall, waste is tipped into a large concrete bunker. Here the feedstock is homogenised by a crane operator, who mixes the waste and removes unsuitable items. A grab crane then manoeuvres waste from the bunker to the hoppers that feed the furnace. This crane is operated from a control room. This room also monitors the equipment in the plant, the combustion gases and maximises the efficiency of the plant.

From the hoppers, the waste falls onto the furnace-charging chute and from there onto the incinerating grate. Here it is burned at a temperature in excess of 1,200 °C. This heat is then converted into super heated steam through the plant's boilers. This in turn powers steam turbines, much in the same way as a conventional thermal power station. Electricity is generated at 11 kilovolts. After exiting the turbines, the steam is condensed back to water. The original two incineration lines use river water from the Tees as a cooling medium, whereas in the third line, water is condensed through air cooled condensers. The cooled water is treated and reused in the boilers.

Gases from the furnace are cleaned using selective non-catalytic reduction (SNCR), spray absorbers and active carbon injection. These processes remove nitrogen oxides, acidic gasses, dioxins and heavy metals from the plants emissions. The remaining gases are passed through fine-fabric bag filters to remove any particles, before it is released from the chimney. Each incineration line has its own independent stack in the chimney, and the flue gases are continuously monitored before being released. This information is relayed to the control room. The remaining fly ash from the filters contains particles from the incineration, lime from the spray absorbers, salt and carbon dust, and so is stored in a sealed silo until it is taken from the site for disposal. Incinerator bottom ash left on the incineration grate after the burning is moved by conveyor to a bunker. Whilst on the conveyor, a magnet removes ferrous metal from the ash for recycling. The remaining ash is then used as an aggregate in the construction industry.

A recycling centre operates next to the plant, which opened in December 2001. In 2006 a composting facility was opened.

== Environmental impact ==
Waste to energy plants are strictly monitored, and the plant has achieved various ISO external certificates. The plant is seen to be at the forefront of sustainable energy production and waste disposal. The plant not only reduces the amount of waste sent to landfill, but displaces the burning of depleting fossil fuels, and makes significant contributions to meeting the North East region's waste recovery and recycling targets.

== North East Energy Recovery Centre ==
A rendition of the planned second plant

In 2008, it was announced SITA had plans to build another EfW plant adjacent to the current one, named the North East Energy Recovery Centre (NEERC). SITA UK began consulting key partners, stakeholders and local residents on these plans in April 2008, before submitting a formal planning application that summer. Permission for the plant's construction was granted on 15 October 2008. On 17 September 2010, it was announced that SITA had signed a contract with the South Tyne and Wear Waste Management Partnership for their waste to be burned at NEERC once the plant was completed. Construction is expected to begin in early 2011, in time for a 2013 completion date.

NEERC is expected to be capable of handling up to 190,000 tonnes of waste per year. This waste will be burned to generate electricity for the National Grid and cogenerate to provide heat for local industries in the form of steam. NEERC will have two processing lines, capable of generating 21 MW of electricity, enough to provide for 37,500 homes. This means that over the two facilities, 640,000 tonnes of waste will be burned annually, and over 50 MW of electricity generated. This would make Teesside the largest operational EfW centre in the UK outside London. The plant will be a mirror image of the current one, and will create 160 jobs; 25 in South Tyne and Wear, 100 in the construction of the plant, and the rest once the plant is operational.

In August 2010, SITA teamed up with Sembcorp UK to build another waste-to-energy facility in the Teesside region. Wilton 11 on the Wilton International complex is to burn a further 400,000 tonnes of waste in the region whilst generating 35 MW of electricity. The plant was expected to be operational by 2015.
