= Tees Viaduct =

Viaduct over the River Tees in Northern England

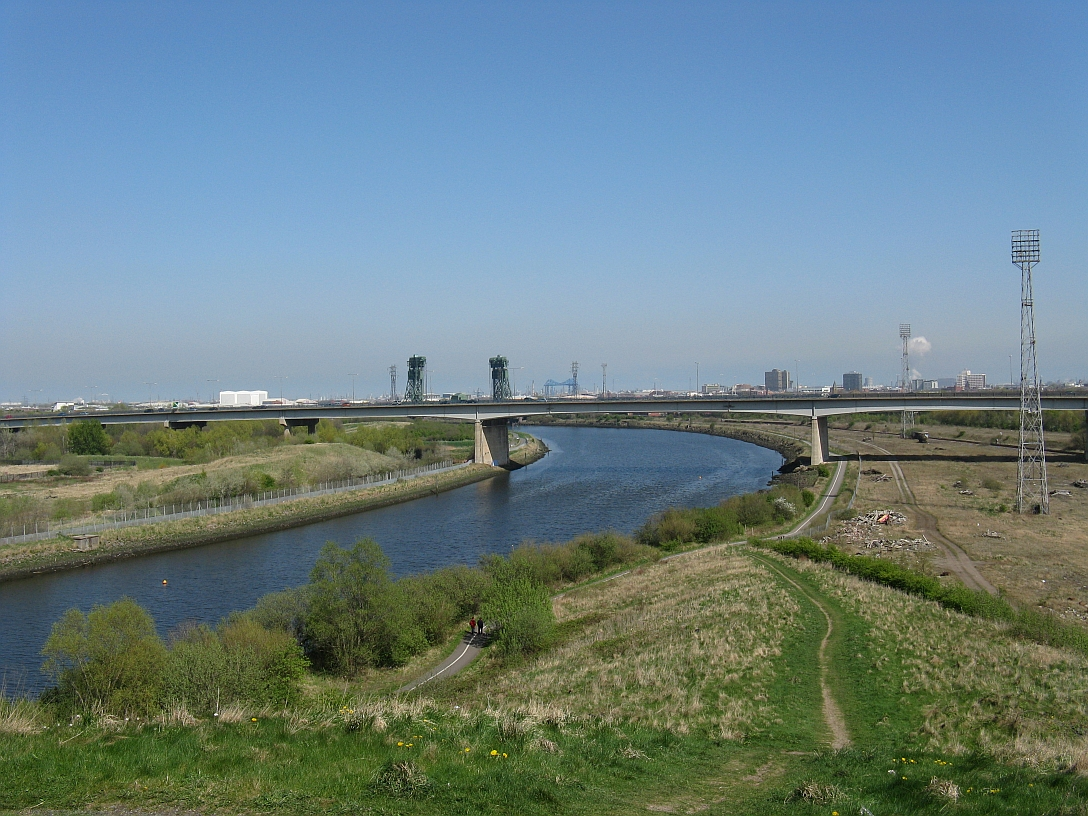
- (A19) Tees Viaduct from Maze Park's viewing hill
- Coordinates: 54°34′4.08″N 1°16′4.44″W
- Carries: A19 road
- Crosses: River Tees, Teesdale Way, Thornaby Middlesbrough railway line, B6541 and A66 roads and Lustrum Beck
- Locale: Middlesbrough, England
- Official name: A19 Tees Viaduct
- Owner: National Highways
- Maintained by: Autolink Concessionaires (A19) Limited (1997–2027)
- Preceded by: Tees Barrage
- Followed by: Tees Newport Bridge

Characteristics
- Design: Slab and Girder
- Material: Steel plate girders and composite concrete deck on reinforced concrete piers
- Total length: 2.9 km, spanning 1.95 km
- Longest span: 117 metres (384 ft)
- No. of spans: 68
- Piers in water: none

History
- Construction start: 1973
- Construction end: 1975
- Opened: November 1975

Statistics
- Daily traffic: 112,000 vehicles per day (2016)

The A19 Tees Viaduct or Tees Flyover is a high level six-lane dual carriageway road bridge in the North East of England carrying the main A19 trunk road north–south across the River Tees.

The bridge is located between Middlesbrough and Stockton-on-Tees just north of the A19's interchange with the A66 trunk road and carries the north–south traffic through Teesside avoiding the main towns but is also used extensively by local traffic. On the southern bank the bridge crosses the marshalling yard railway lines and the main Thornaby-Middlesbrough section of Tees Valley Line, the B6541 (Old A66/A67, Stockton Road) and the A66 road. On the northern bank the bridge crosses the Teesdale Way long-distance cycle/footpath, Lustrum Beck, a service road, footpath (disused railway line) and the main roundabout on the Portrack Interchange.

== Design ==
The viaduct is a beam or girder bridge. It has reinforced concrete piers and pier bends supporting steel-plate girder beams and a composite deck with some 200 moving parts. The viaduct is 2.9 km long and 1.95 km between abutments and was at the time the largest such bridge in the British Isles.

It has 68 spans on the main north south route—the largest span being that over the river at 117 m. The bridge was designed with sufficient clearance to allow ships to pass, although the port of Stockton-on-Tees up-river was virtually redundant by then. Since the Tees Newport Bridge had its lifting deck permanently fixed in the down position in 1990, large shipping can no longer reach the Tees viaduct, further reducing the need for such a high structure.

== Construction ==
The bridge was built between 1973 and 1975 encompassing the 'Three-Day Week' and that may account for some of its subsequent problems.

== Operation and maintenance ==
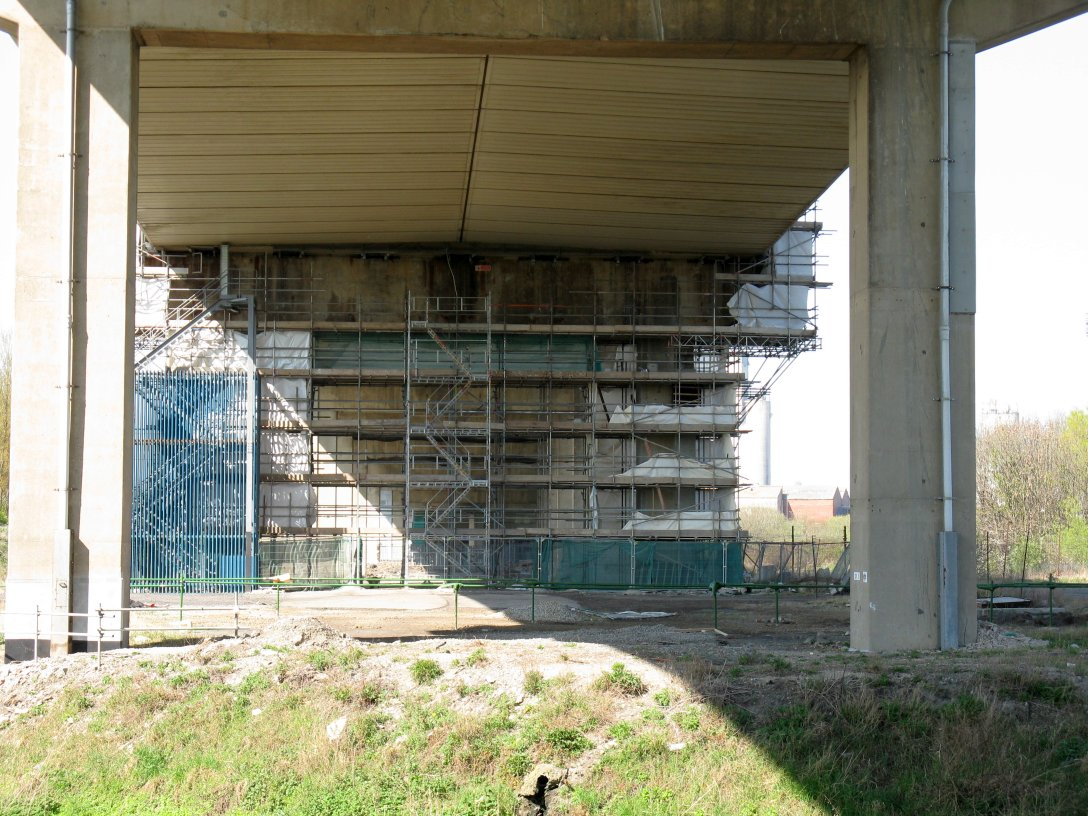
Continuing repair work on the viaduct

The viaduct was opened in November 1975. The bridge has had problems with corrosion since it was opened and repairs have been necessary at times. Expansion joints cracked allowing de-icing salts to wash from the bridge carriageway into the piers, cross beams and columns giving rise to extensive chloride attack. It was then decided the best solution was the complete demolition and reconstruction of most of the piers and repair of others. The bridge was originally constructed with two-lane carriageways and a concrete apron up to the parapet but this was expanded to three lanes.

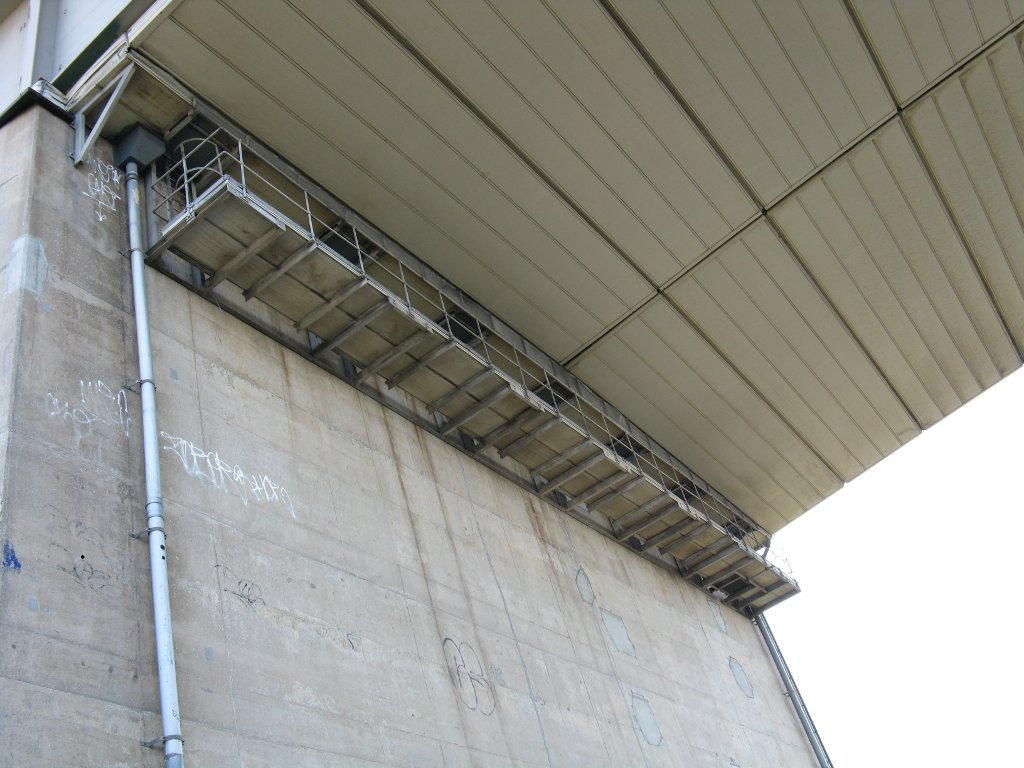
River pier, drainpipe, GRP enclosure and access points

From 1988 to 1989 the underside of the bridge was enclosed with a steel and GRP panelling structure to protect the primary structure from the effects of weather and to allow safe and easy inspection and maintenance. The A19 including the Tees Viaduct is operated by Autolink Concessionaires (A19) Limited, a consortium comprising Sir Robert McAlpine, Taylor Woodrow and Amey under a thirty-year DBFO (Design Build Finance Operate) agreement with the Highways Agency running from 1997 to 2027. The bridge carried an average of 112,000 vehicles a day in 2016 and concerns that the capacity of the road is being exceeded at peak times has led to a study detailing the proposals for a new crossing. Because of this CCTV cameras were installed on the bridge to record incident related congestion and to enable a quicker response.

Starting in 1997 the approach roads to the bridge were widened from two lanes to three. A detailed principal inspection report in 2006 concluded that the Tees Viaduct overall is in fair condition.

== Image gallery ==
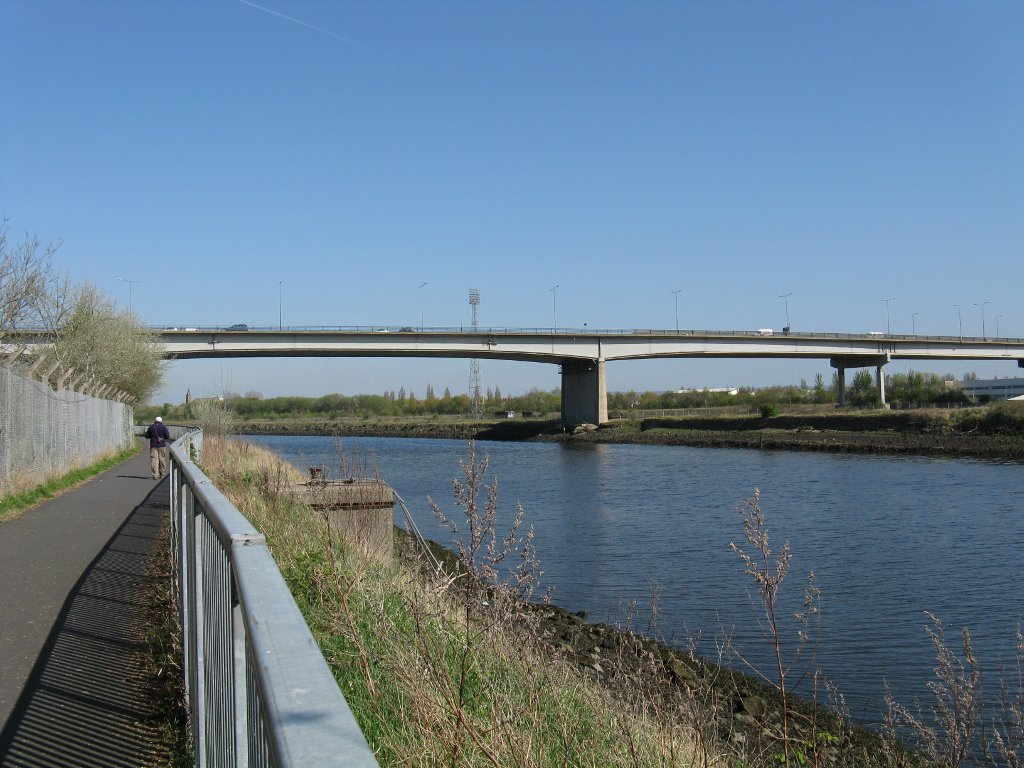
Tees Viaduct from the north bank looking downriver

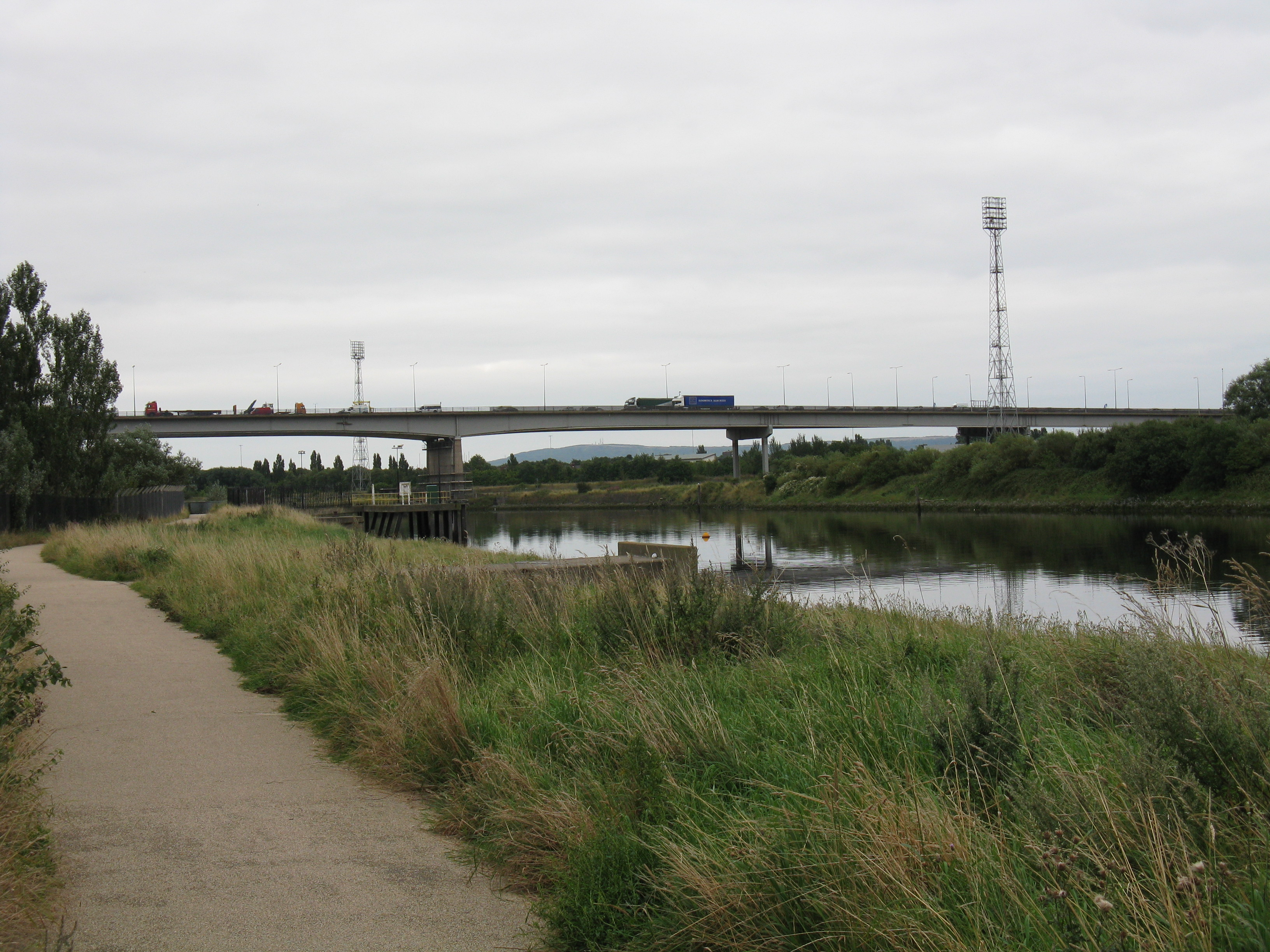
Tees Viaduct from the north bank looking downriver

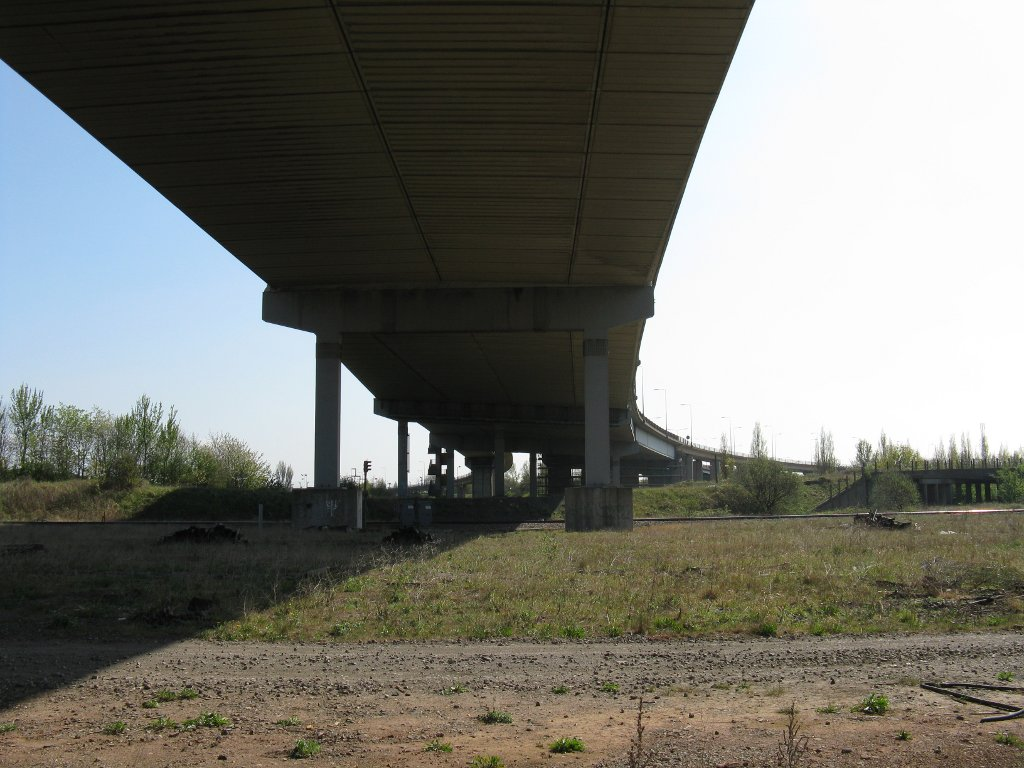
The southern piers of the viaduct

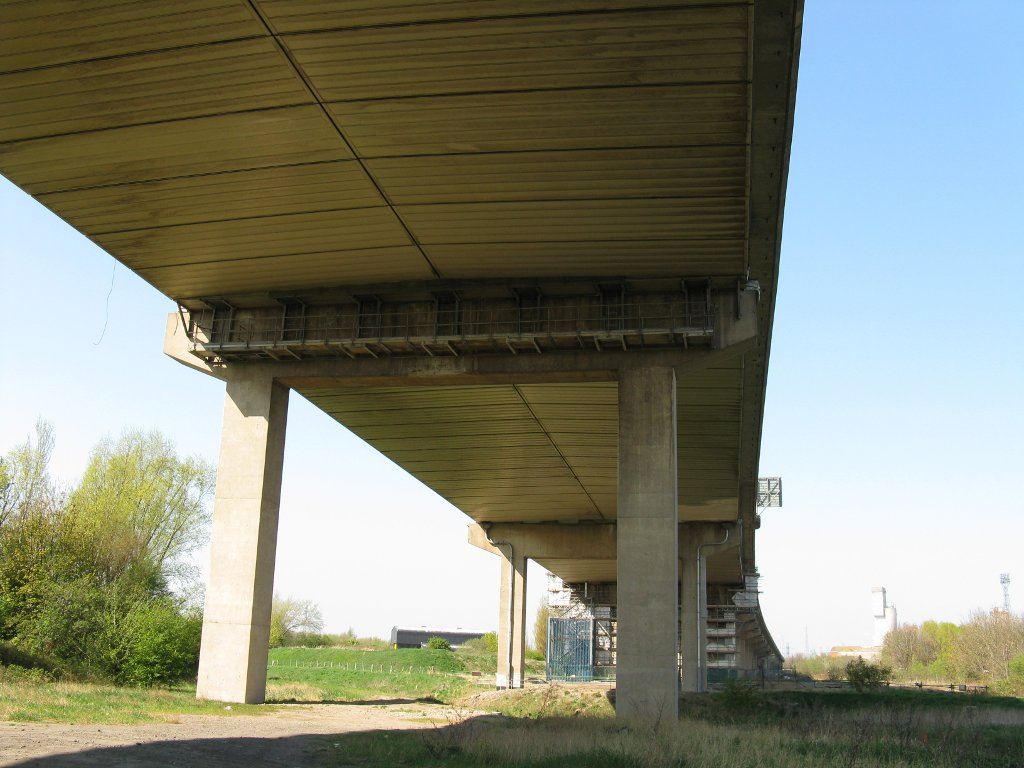
The northern piers of the viaduct
