= Tees Valley Wildlife Trust =

Charitable organisation focused on environmental conservation in the Tees Valley, UK

- Website: www.teeswildlife.org

The Tees Valley Wildlife Trust is a wildlife trust covering the Tees Valley area of England. Its area of operation corresponds to the four unitary authorities of Hartlepool, Stockton-on-Tees, Middlesbrough and Redcar and Cleveland, covering parts of the ceremonial counties of County Durham and North Yorkshire.

== Reserves ==
The Tees Valley Wildlife Trust manages fourteen nature reserves with over 230 hectares (568 acres), including:

Reserve	Area (ha)	Grid reference ^{[A]}	Owner
Cattersty Gill Nature Reserve		NZ7020	
Maze Park Nature Reserve	17	NZ46731924	
Portrack Marsh Nature Reserve	20	NZ46511952	
Portrack Meadows Wildlife Reserve		NZ47401981	

== Notes ==
^{A} Grid references use the British national grid reference system (OSGB36), the system used on Ordnance Survey maps. The grid reference for each reserve relates to the approximate centre of the reserve.
