= Teesside Development Corporation =

Regeneration body in England, 1987–1998

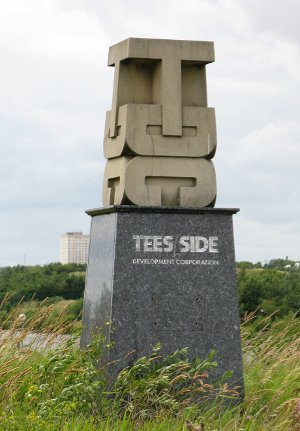
- TDC statue at the Tees Barrage
- Formation: 1987
- Dissolved: 1998
- Headquarters: Middlesbrough
- Chair: Sir Ron Norman
- Deputy chair: Lord Dormand of Easington
- Chief executive: Duncan Hall

The Teesside Development Corporation was a government-backed development corporation that was established in 1987 to fund and manage regeneration projects in the former county of Cleveland in North East England.

== History ==
The corporation was established as part of an initiative by the future Deputy Prime Minister, Michael Heseltine, in February 1987 during the Second Thatcher ministry. Board members were directly appointed by the minister and overrode local authority planning controls to spend government money on infrastructure. This was a controversial measure in Labour strongholds such as East London, Merseyside and North East England.

The Teesside Development Corporation developed several schemes, many on former industrial land on both sides of the River Tees and around Hartlepool ranging from housing, commercial, light industrial and leisure projects. Its flagship developments included the Tees Barrage, Hartlepool Marina, Teesside Park (a retail centre) and Teesdale Business Park. During its 11-year lifetime 4,600,000 square feet (430,000 m^{2}) of non-housing development and 1,306 housing units were built. Around 12,226 new jobs were created and some £1,089 million of private finance was leveraged in. Circa 1,295 acres (5.24 km^{2}) of derelict land was reclaimed and 22 miles (35 km) of new road and footpaths put in place.

The chairman was Sir Ron Norman and the chief executive was Duncan Hall; the deputy chairman was the former Member of Parliament for Easington, Lord Dormand of Easington. Most of its roles were taken over by the four local authorities of Hartlepool, Stockton-on-Tees, Middlesbrough, and Redcar and Cleveland as well as the regional development agency OneNorthEast and English Partnerships on its dissolution in 1998.

In 1998, the corporation was condemned by Labour MP Ashok Kumar for having left a legacy of limited and "often inappropriate and threadbare development". Michael Heseltine was tasked in 2015 with creating a plan for the regeneration of Teesside after the closure of the steel works. This was to lead to the creation of the South Tees Development Corporation.

== See also ==
- South Tees Development Corporation
- Tees Valley Regeneration
