= Tees Barrage =

Bridge and dam over the River Tees in England

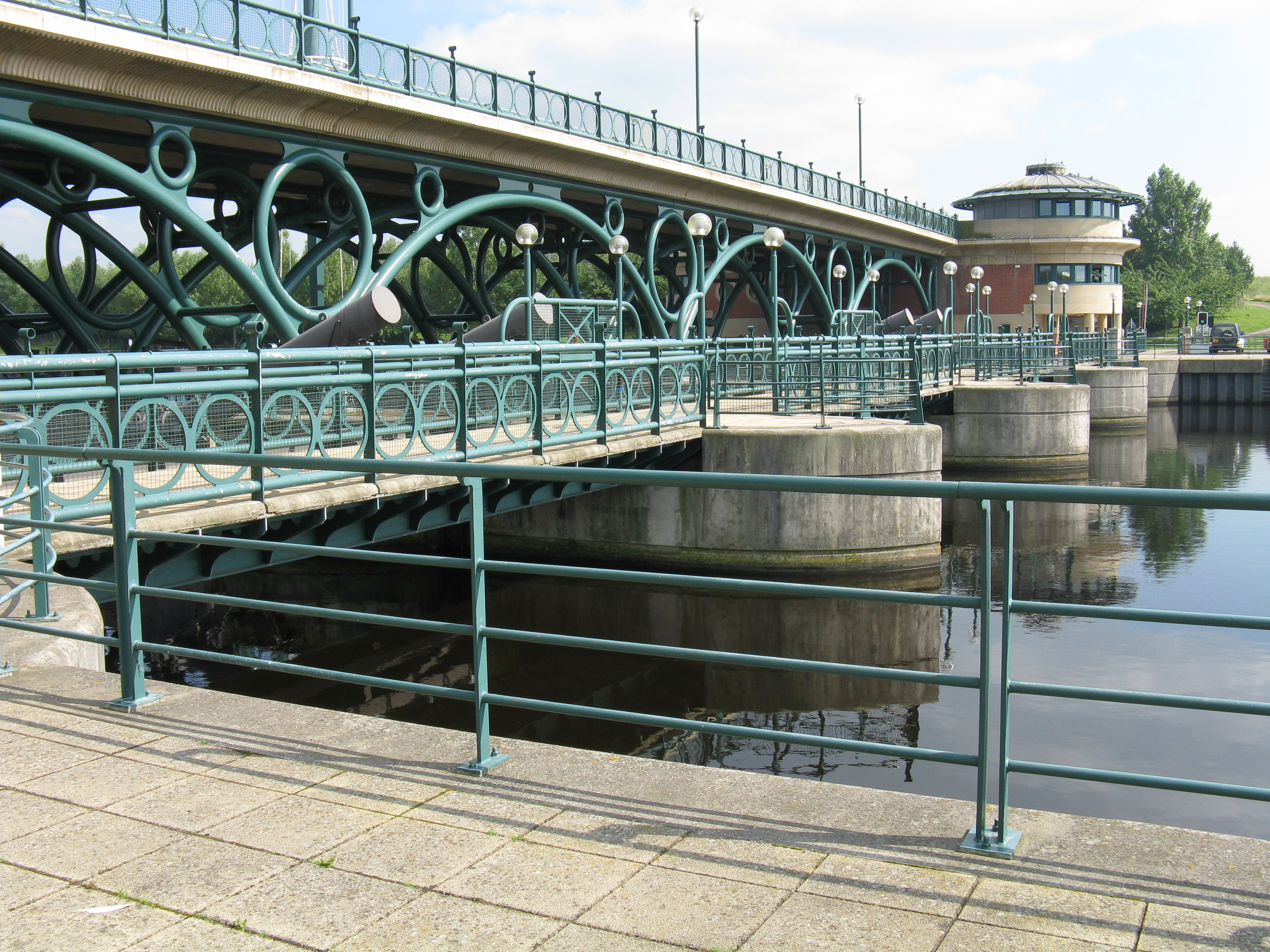
- View of the Tees barrage, bridge and footbridge from the upstream north bank
- Coordinates: 54°33′52″N 1°17′10″W
- Carries: Tees Barrage Way – pedestrians and cyclists use the footbridge (Teesdale Way)
- Crosses: River Tees and Teesdale Way
- Locale: Stockton-on-Tees, England, United Kingdom
- Official name: Tees Barrage
- Maintained by: Canal & River Trust
- Website: canalrivertrust.org.uk/places-to-visit/tees-barrage-and-stockton
- Preceded by: Infinity Bridge
- Followed by: Tees Viaduct

Characteristics
- Design: Arched viaduct
- Material: Concrete, welded tubular steel and plate steel
- Total length: 160 m
- Longest span: 7.5 m
- No. of spans: 8
- Piers in water: 3
- Load limit: 45 units of HB loading
- Clearance below: 5 m (5.37 m in the lock)
- Design life: 120 years

History
- Designer: Ove Arup and The Napper Partnership
- Constructed by: Tarmac Construction
- Fabrication by: Westbury Tubular Structures
- Construction start: 4 November 1991
- Construction end: 1995
- Opened: 22 April 1995
- Inaugurated: 17 July 1995

Statistics
- Daily traffic: very light

Location
- Interactive map of Tees Barrage

The Tees Barrage is a barrage and road bridge across the River Tees, Northern England, just upriver of Blue House Point and is used to control the flow of the river, preventing flooding and the effects of tidal change. It is between the towns of Stockton-on-Tees and Thornaby, road access is only by the latter with limited road access to the Tees's north bank.

The Tees Barrage comprises a river barrage, road bridge, footbridge, barge lock, fish pass and access point to a white water course. The waters above the barrage are permanently held at the level of an average high tide and are used for watersports such as canoeing, jet skiing, dragonboat racing and incorporates a 1 km rowing course.

The Tees Barrage and Tees Barrage International White Water Course were developed during the 1990s by the Teesside Development Corporation.

== Design ==
The concrete base of the barrage is 70 m wide, 32 m long, and 5 m thick; it is supported by five concrete piers. In between the piers are four 8 m tall, 50 tonne fish belly plates to control the flow of water, operated by 21 tonne hydraulic rams. The 600 ton road bridge is of a tubular steel arched viaduct design specified at 45 units of HB motorway loading. The bridge has eight welded tubular steel arches each 17.5 m wide with a 5 m rise but only the four central arches actually cross the waters of the river Tees. The arches are sprayed with green chlorinated rubber paint and are sealed against corrosion. Some 16,500 cubic metres of reinforced concrete and 650 tons of structural steel went into the building of the barrage.

On the downstream side of the central pier is a 29 m tower of lights with reflective globes and plates, supported by guy ropes. Illumination is provided by four lights on the concrete barrage base for ease of maintenance.

The barrage has two pavilions, one on the south bank, and a little-used one on the north bank, both extending under the road bridge. The south bank pavilion houses the barrage control room and the offices of the SMi – Stockton Middlesbrough Initiative. A visitors' centre is also planned for the barrage. The barrage has a design life of 120 years. The project also included the regeneration of 100 ha of adjacent derelict land producing riverside walks, parkland and leisure facilities.

== Construction ==
The Teesside Development Corporation proposed a barrage across the Tees in an act of Parliament and then organised a design competition for the barrage bridge that was won by Ove Arup and the Napper Partnership. The barrage was constructed by Tarmac Construction. Construction work was started on 4 November 1991. The construction method chosen by Tarmac was to divert the River Tees around the barrage site to allow the barrage to be built "in the dry" and avoid the need for providing time-consuming and expensive cofferdams and jetties in the existing river. To prevent uplift of the dry river bed, deep pressure relief wells were required which needed to be fully functional until the barrage was built and the site flooded. The wells were installed and maintained by WJ Groundwater Limited under a subcontract with Tarmac.

== Operation ==
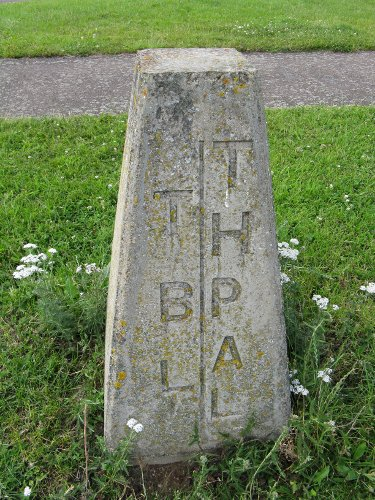
Boundary stone marking the limits of the Tees Barrage and the Tees and Hartlepool Port Authority

The barrage was opened on 22 April 1995 with an international competition on the white water course, and inaugurated on 17 July the same year by Prince Philip, Duke of Edinburgh. In April 2001 ownership of the Tees Barrage and white water course was passed to British Waterways (now the Canal & River Trust) from its original owners English Partnerships.

The Canal & River Trust are also responsible for managing the 11 miles of navigable grade A two star waters of the river Tees from the barrage up to the Low Moor Weir at Low Worsall beyond Yarm. Operation of the river below the barrage is the responsibility of the Tees and Hartlepool Port Authority. Large quantities of natural debris such as branches are being washed down and caught by the barrage that otherwise would have been taken out to sea, and there are ongoing studies looking into the feasibility of burning this debris for power generation in waste-to-energy power stations.

== Barge Lock ==
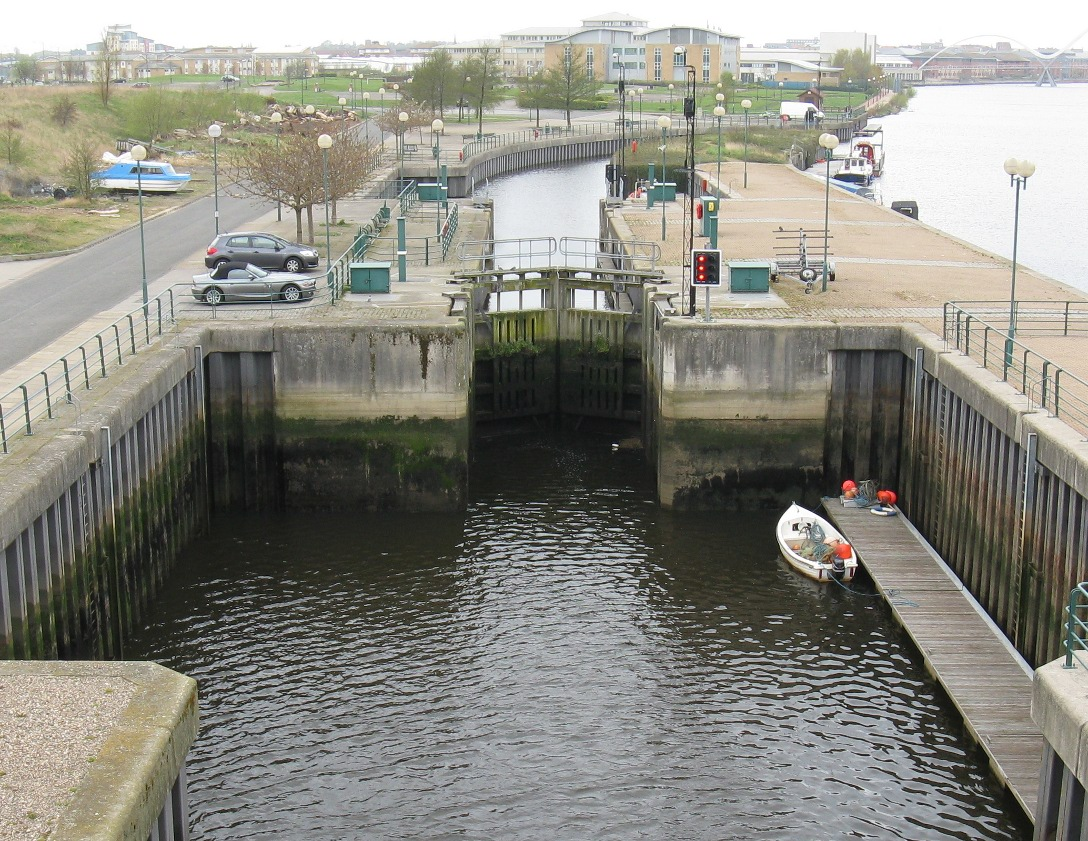
Tees barrage barge lock

The lock is a single-rise lock with two pairs of lock gates to allow light river traffic to negotiate the barrage. The dimensions of the lock are length 24.88 m, beam 6.08 m, height 5.37 m with a draught of 2.48 m. If necessary, when the lock is in use, a single leaf steel bascule lifting bridge over the lock is raised to allow the passage of lock traffic. There is no charge to use the lock however users must have permits to use the river both above and below the barrage.

=== Tidal Turbine Test Facility ===
On 8 June 2007 a new facility was opened for testing prototype marine current turbines and other turbine devices. This facility is operated and funded by the National Renewable Energy Centre. It uses the hydraulic head in the barge lock to release water through sluices at a controlled velocity to create a simulation of steady ocean current conditions downstream of the lock.

The first turbine to be tested at this site was Evopod, a semi submerged floating tidal turbine developed by offshore consultancy Ocean Flow Energy Ltd based in North Shields. The test was largely a success and further devices are booked including a Rugged Renewables Savonius rotor that is to be deployed as a building-mounted turbine. The development of this facility completes NaREC's portfolio of test facilities.

== Tees Barrage International White Water Course ==
As part of the project, an artificial whitewater course was created that has since hosted many significant watersport competitions. The £4.6 million facility was opened ahead of the 2012 London Olympics. It produces its own green energy, which it feeds back into the National Grid.

== Footbridge ==
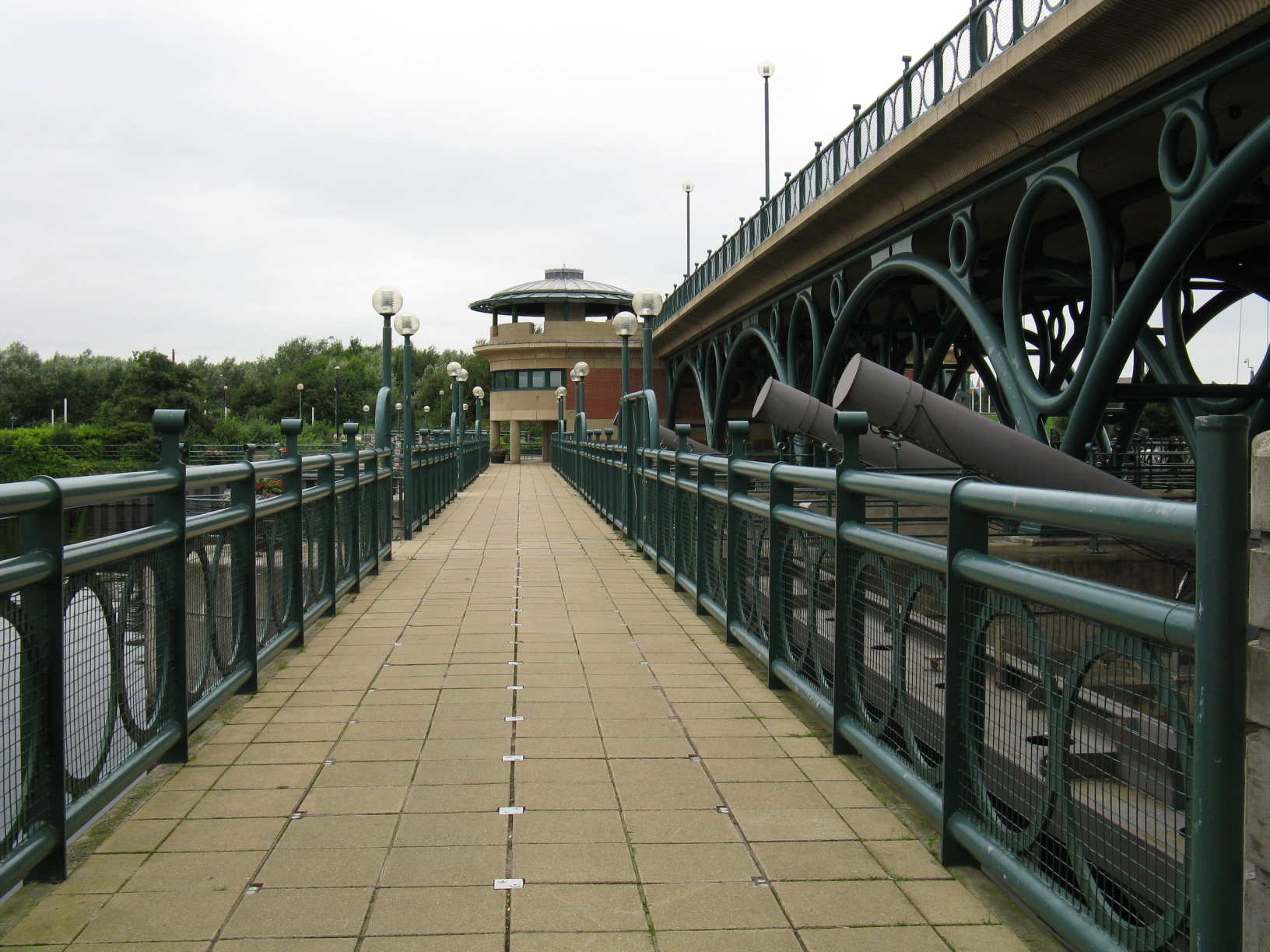
View along the footbridge/cycleway with north bank pavilion in the background

A steel footbridge carries walkers and cyclists across the concrete piers of the barrage on the Teesdale Way, part of the National Cycle Network. The footbridge consists of two parts, a steel footbridge across the concrete piers and a hydraulically operated single-leaf steel bascule across the lock to allow river craft to pass. Although the public cannot gain direct access to the barrage itself, the footbridge affords excellent views of the fish belly plates and hydraulics.

== Fish pass ==
To allow migratory salmon and sea trout to negotiate the barrage a fish pass with fish counter and viewing area is installed next to the north bank pavilion. Some angling groups argue that the progress of migratory fish is delayed below the barrier as fish have difficulty finding the very narrow entrance to the fish pass and that excessive numbers of foraging seals are taking advantage of this delay and are predating these fish and thus damaging the recovery of salmonids on the Tees. The fish pass still only has provisional approval from the Environment Agency and as an interim measure fish pen stocks are being used on the river and the barrage lock is being operated in such a way as to allow fish to pass. Starting in April 2008 British Waterways commissioned a three-year electronic fish tagging survey to help understand the interactions and relationships between various wildlife at the barrage focusing on seal numbers and salmonid migration.

== Photo gallery ==
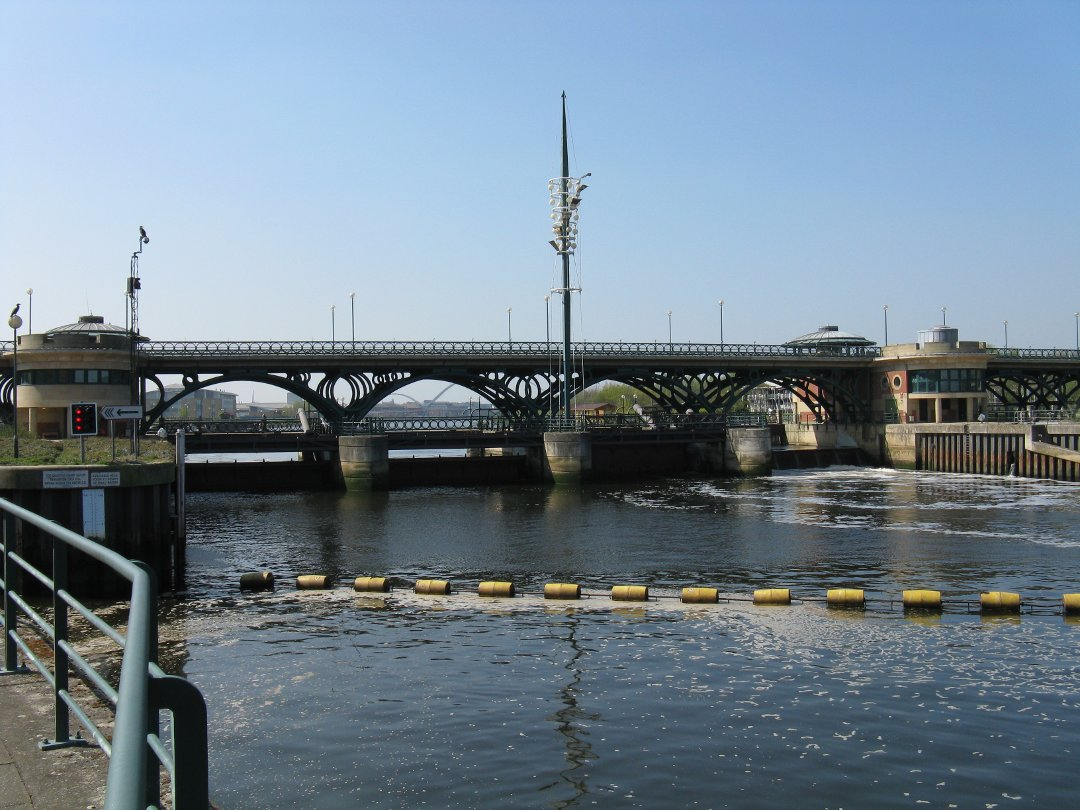
View of the Tees Barrage and bridge from downstream

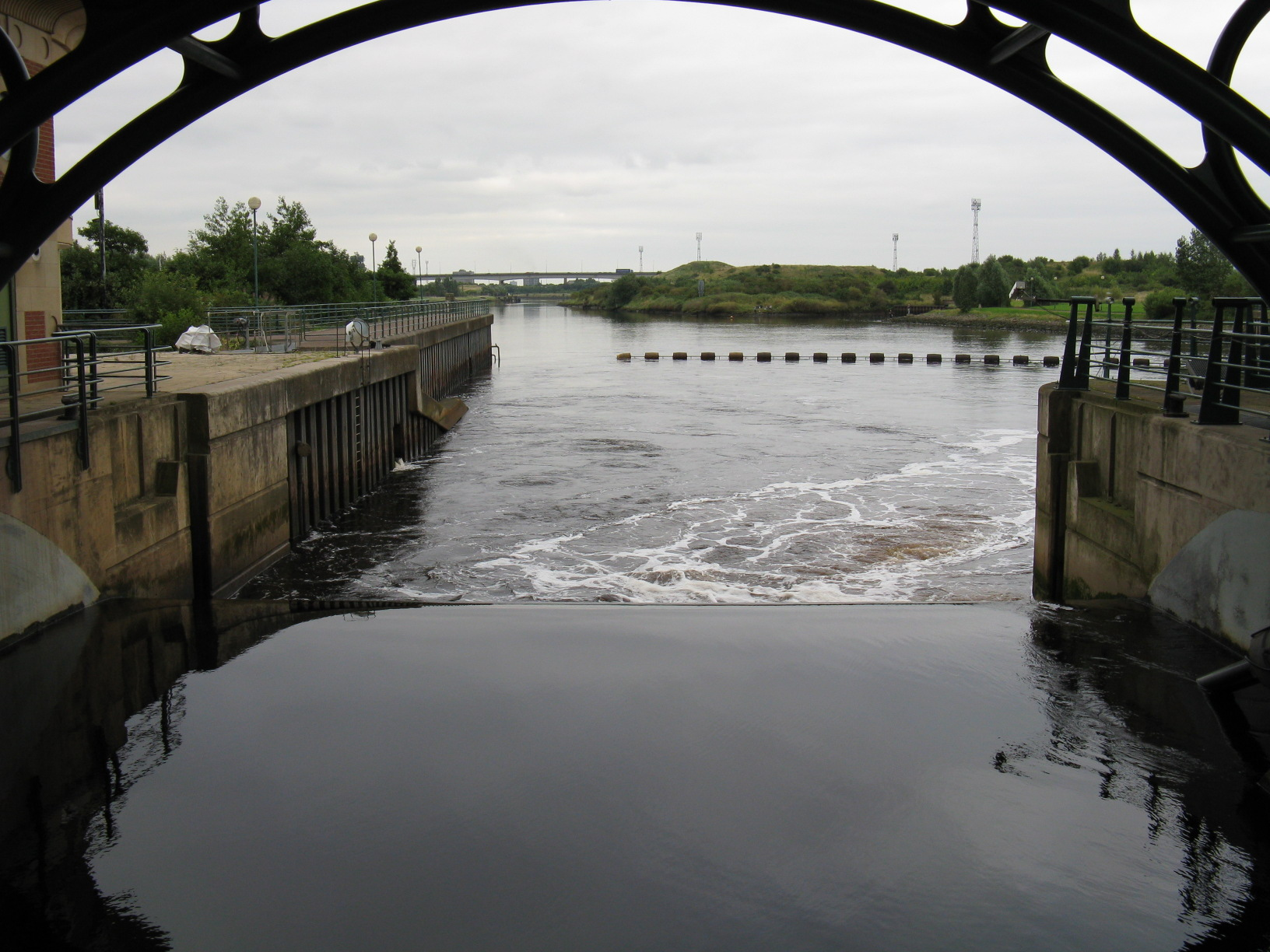
View through the north gate of Tees Barrage showing fish pass entrance (centre left) and monitoring camera (right)

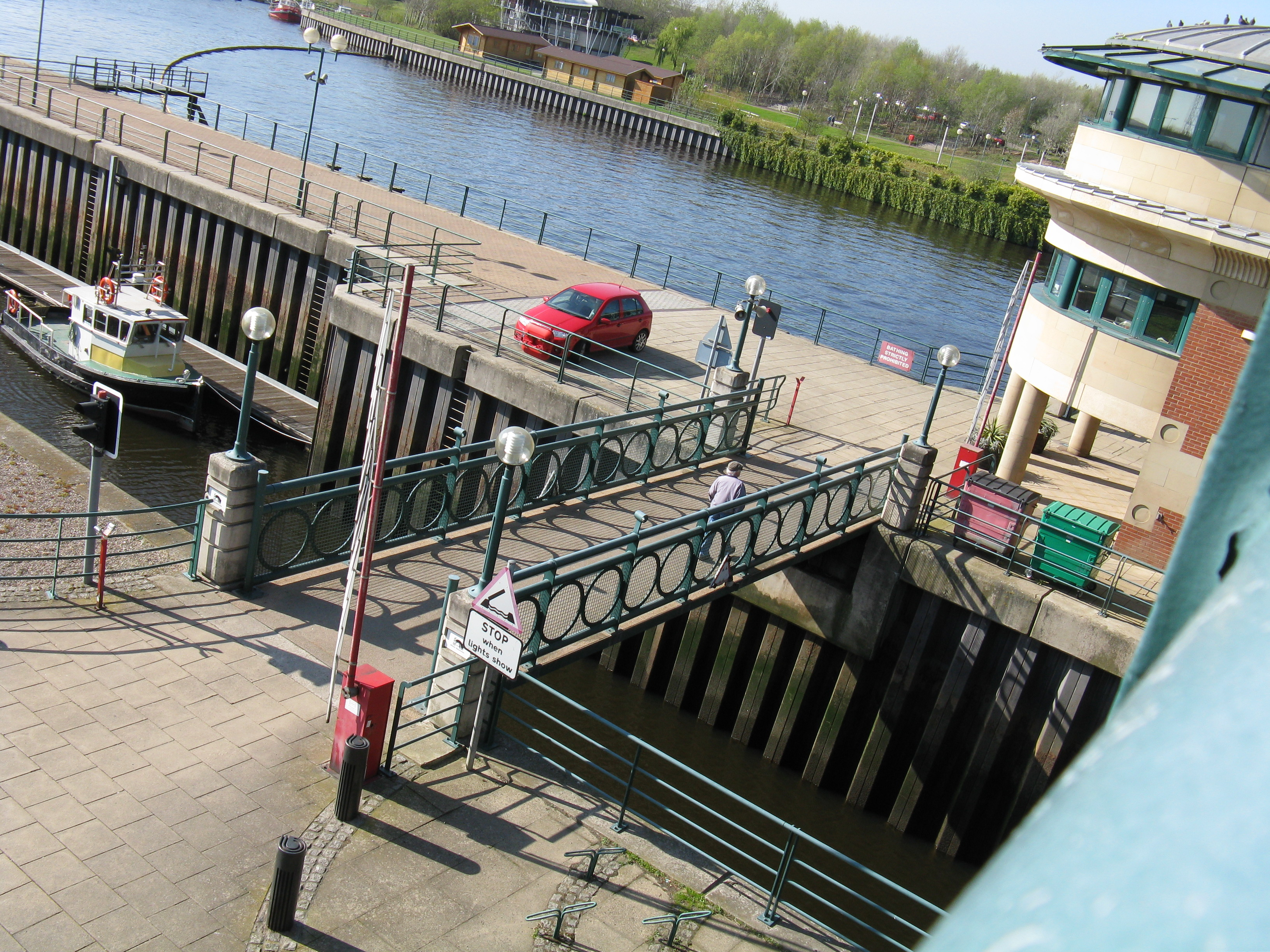
Bascule lifting bridge over the waters of the entrance to the barrage lock.

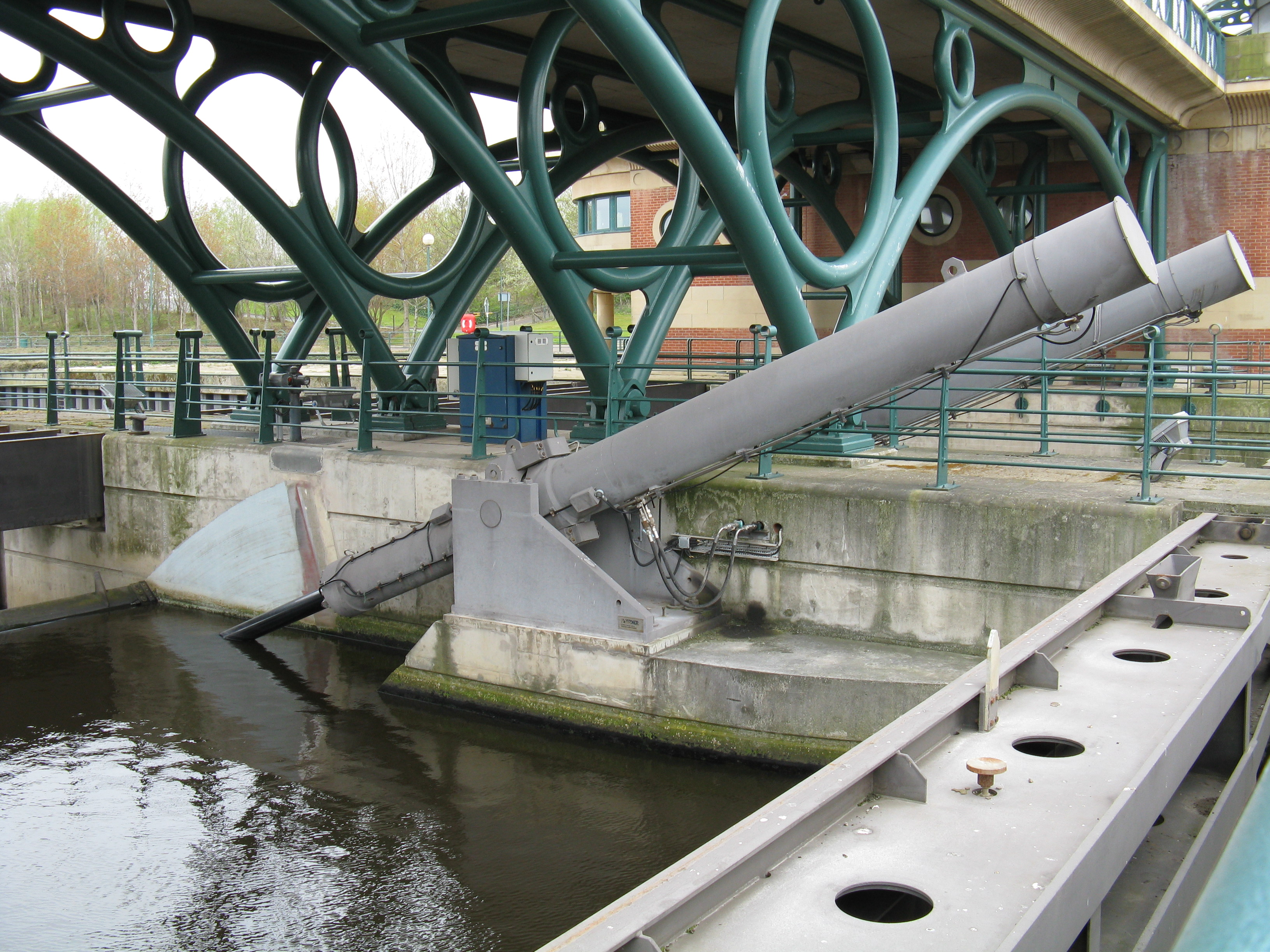
Gate, hydraulics, concrete pier and bridgework of the Tees Barrage.

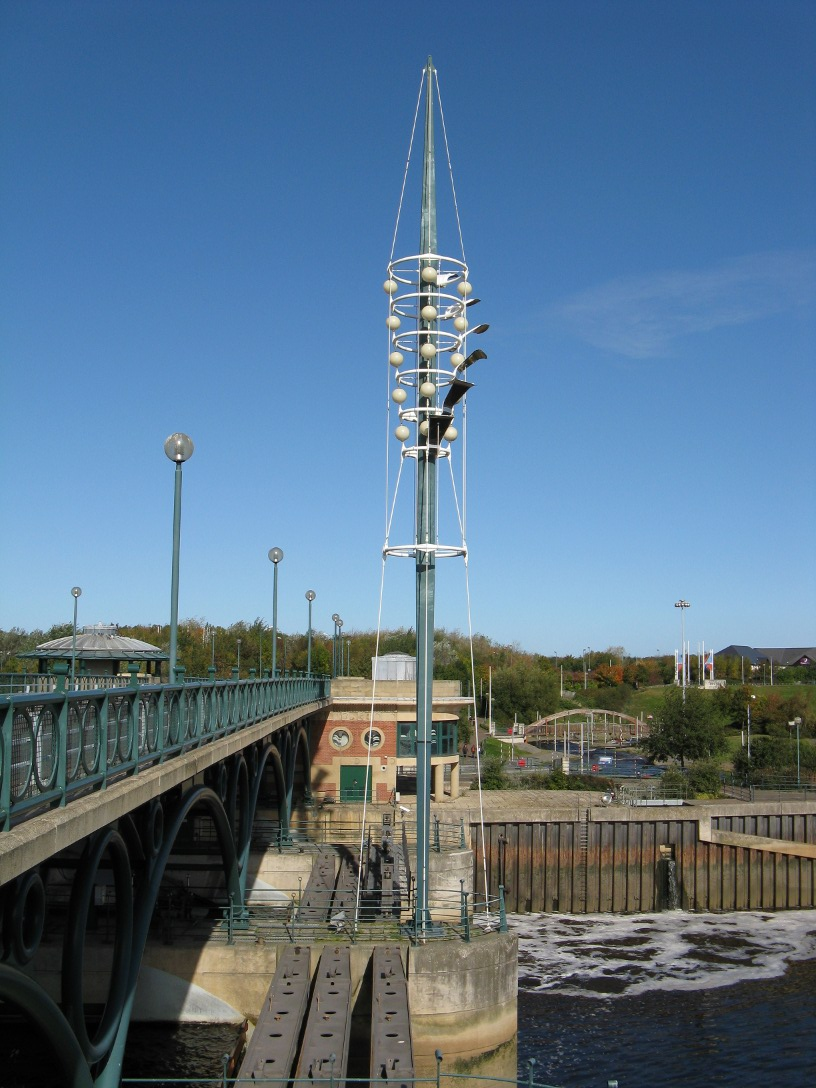
The 'Tower of Lights' on the central pier of the Tees Barrage.

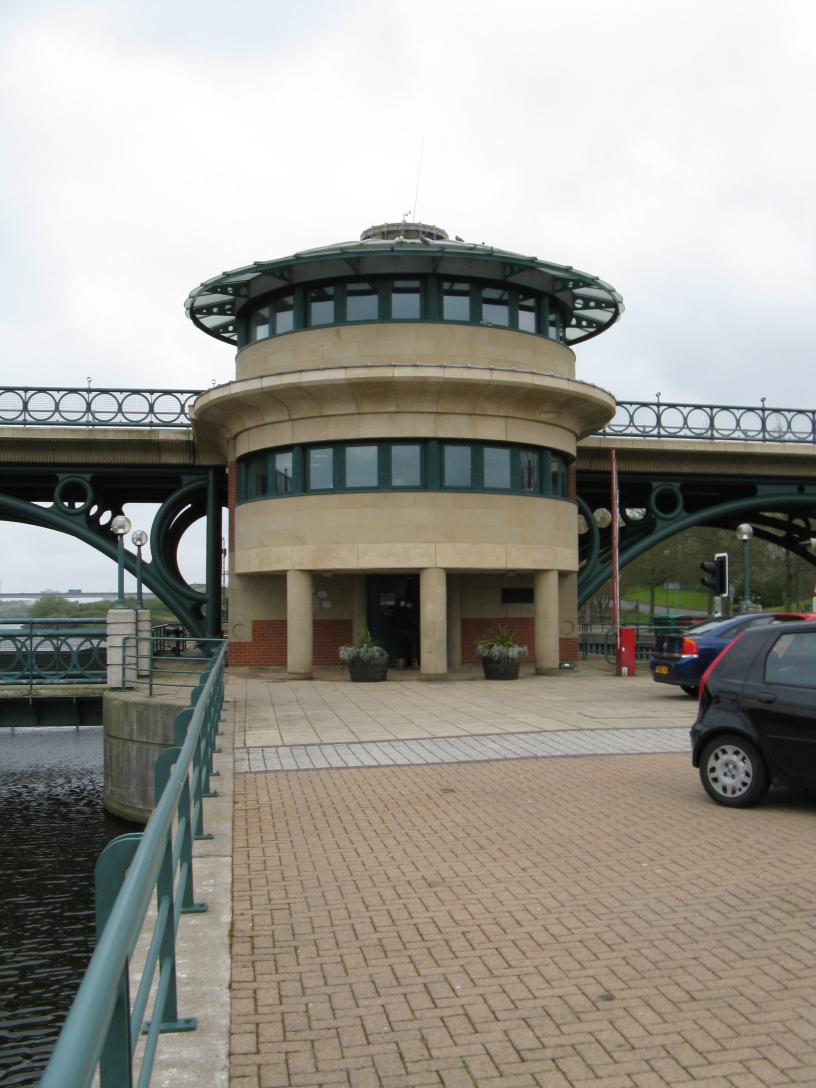
The southern pavilion of the Tees Barrage housing the barrage control room.

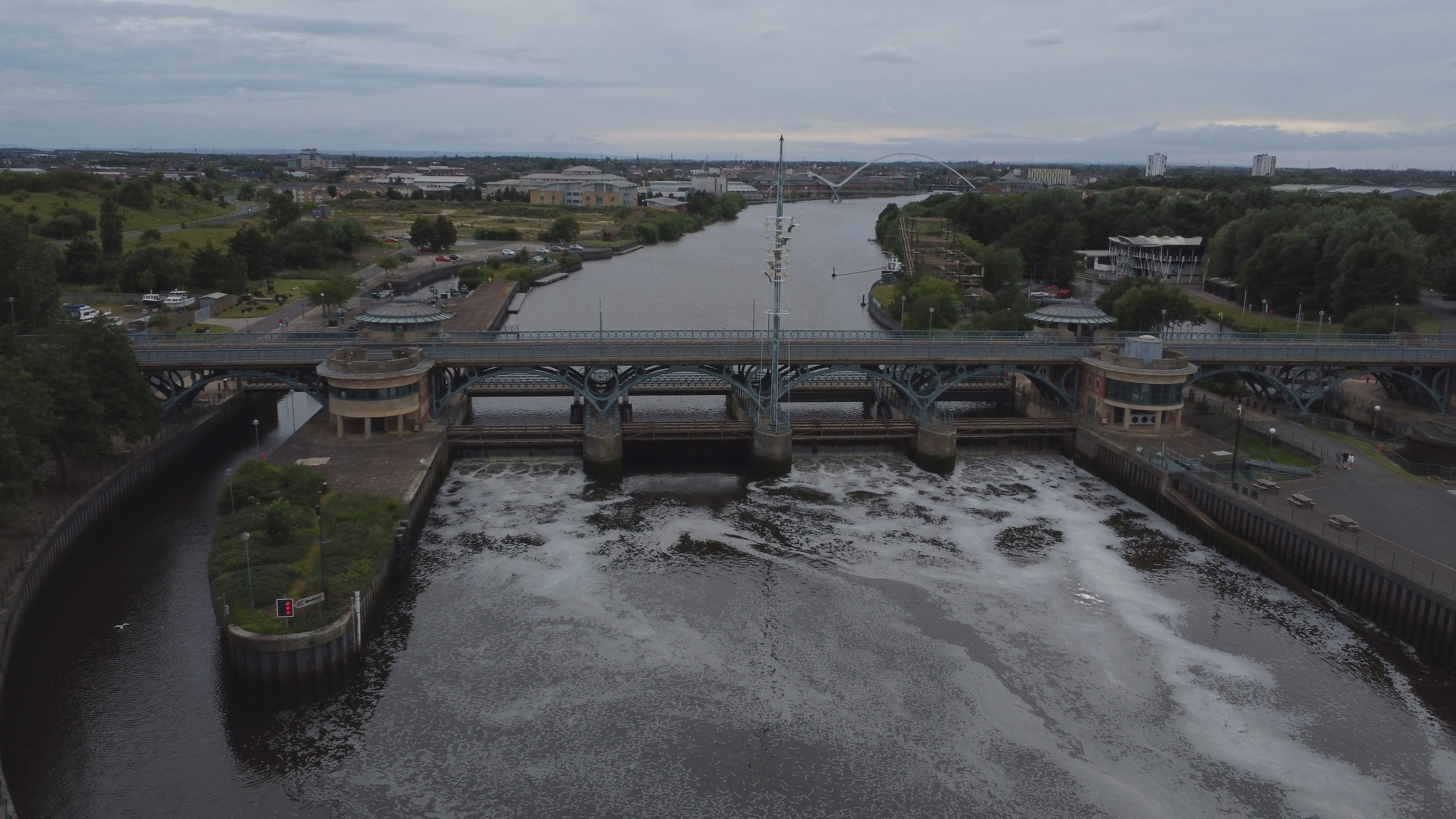
An aerial view of the barrage.
