= Inward =

Inward may refer to:

- Avera and inward, feudal services
- Inward Operator, a connection method between telephone operators
- Direct Inward Dialing, a way to bypass company switchboards - also called Direct Dial-In (DDI) in Europe and Australasia
- Inward investment, the injection of money from an external source into a region
- Inward Parts, the second album by the English band The Others
- Inward-rectifier potassium ion channel (Kir, IRK), a specific subset of potassium selective ion channels
- North England Inward Investment Agency, UK government sponsored agency
