= Teesdale Business Park =

Business park in Thornaby-on-Tees, England

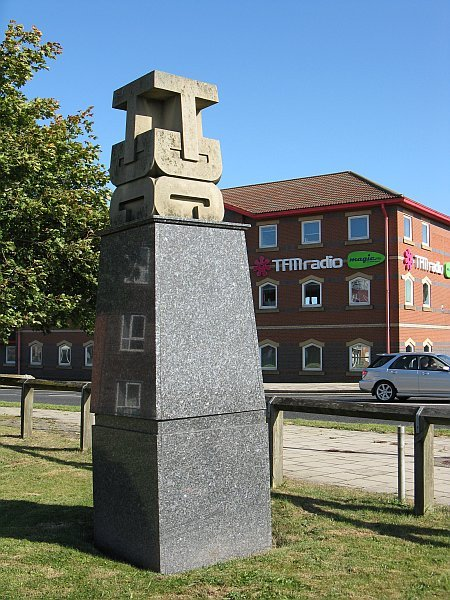
- Teesside Development Corporation monolith at the entrance to Teesdale Business Park
- Interactive map of Teesdale Business Park
- Type: Business park
- Location: Thornaby
- Coordinates: 54°33′41″N 1°18′13″W
- Area: Borough of Stockton-on-Tees

Teesdale Business Park is a major business park on the former site of Head Wrightsons' Teesdale works in Thornaby-on-Tees, North Yorkshire, England. The park was redeveloped by the Teesside Development Corporation. The area is immediately north of Thornaby railway station.

The business park is bounded by the Tees Valley Rail-line and the River Tees. It is a short distance from Stockton-on-Tees town centre – connected via the Victoria, Teesquay Millennium, Princess of Wales and Infinity bridges.

== Buildings and organisations ==
The area consists of the following buildings, businesses and organisations.

Advance House, St. Mark's Court – housing Stockton Probation, and the Commission for Social Care Inspection
Alexander's Car Showroom
BOAZ House, Massey Road – Vacant formerly housing Barclaycard
Barclays House, Sabatier Close – housing Barclays
Cavendish House, Prince's Wharf / Council of Europe Boulevard – housing the Tees Valley Combined Authority, Tees Valley Unlimited LEP and Cubic Transportation Systems. Once housing One NorthEast and Tees Valley Regeneration development agencies
Christine House, Sorbonne Close – housing Turner and Townsend, TABS Recruitment, Middlesbrough Recruitment
Churchill House, Pearson Court, Pearson Way – formerly housing Churchill Insurance
Clearwater House, Columbia Drive – housing Santander's mortgage operations
Crutes House, Fudan Way – housing Crutes Law Firm and accountants Tait Walker
Dunedin House, Columbia Drive – housing Standard Life, Atkins, Halcrow Group Limited, First Choice (travel firm) Holidays, and Energy Solutions International
Endeavour House, St. Mark's Court – housing the Endeavour Housing Association and Teesdale Housing Association
Florence House, Pearson Court, Pearson Way – housing Terra Nitrogen (UK) Limited
George Stephenson House, St Mark's Court – housing HM Revenue and Customs
Kvaerner
OBC House, Sabatier Close – housing OBC Shipping Ltd
Primecare – Cleveland, Massey Road
Petroplus in St. Mark's Court
Progress House, Fudan Way – housing the White Young Green Group
PX House, Westpoint Road – housing PX Ltd (formerly part of Enron) a provider of operations, management and maintenance solutions
Radio House, Yale Crescent, student accommodation, formerly TFM (radio) and Magic 1170
Richard House, Sorbonne Close – housing Ofsted, TJ Hazel (Engineering Consultants) Ltd., Public Lending Right and Safe in Tees Valley Ltd.
Robert House, Westpoint Road / Merchants Wharf – also housing PX Ltd
St. Mark's House, St. Mark's Court – housing the DVLA, the Valuation Office Agency and the Insolvency Service
Swan House, Westpoint Road – housing the Environment Agency
Swiftcover, Fudan Way
Teesdale House, Westpoint Road – housing the North East NHS Strategic Health Authority
VAI House, Fudan Way – housing Siemens VAI (UK)
Victoria House, Pearson Way – housing the stockbrokers Gerrard
Visualsoft House, Prince's Wharf / Council of Europe Boulevard – housing Visualsoft and CEMEX
Westminster House, St. Mark's Court – housing Endeavour Partnerships and LJJ Contractors.

Educational institutions
Durham University – Queen's Campus

John Snow College, Sorbonne Close
Stephenson College, East Drive
Wolfson Research Institute, East Drive

Stockton Riverside College, Harvard Avenue.

Shops and services
Sainsburys Local, Yale Crescent
Teesdale Children's Day Nursery, Yale Crescent.

Public houses
The Dubliners – Bridge Street.

Residential and nursing homes
Alison House Residential Care Home, Fudan Way
Kirkdale Nursing Home, Radcliffe Crescent
Teesdale Lodge Nursing Home, Radcliffe Crescent.

Residential Properties
Anchorage Mews
Claremont Court, Stanford Close
Grosvenor House, Sorbonne Close
Harriet House, Sorbonne Close
Helen House, Sorbonne Close
Rochester Court, Stanford Close
The Waterside, Sorbonne Close
Trinity Mews.

Roads
Chapel Street, Claremont Court, Columbia Drive, Council of Europe Boulevard, East Drive, Fudan Way, Harvard Avenue, Massey Road, Pearson Way, Princeton Drive, Radcliffe Crescent, Sabatier Close, Sorbonne Close, St. Mark's Court, Stanford Close, Station Street, Teesdale Boulevard, Trinity Mews, University Boulevard, Westpoint Road, Yale Crescent.

Bridges
Teesquay Millennium Footbridge
Princess of Wales Bridge
Infinity Bridge
Victoria Bridge

Water features
Merchants Wharf
Prince's Wharf
St. Mark's Basin south east of the Teesquay Millennium Bridge.

== Historic note ==
In 1987, after Head Wrightsons' Teesdale Works closed and the site had been cleared, Prime Minister Margaret Thatcher visited the site as part of her visit to Teesside to open the Teesside Development Corporation and made what has been poignantly termed her "Walk in the Wilderness".
