= Teesquay Millennium Footbridge =

Footbridge over the River Tees, England

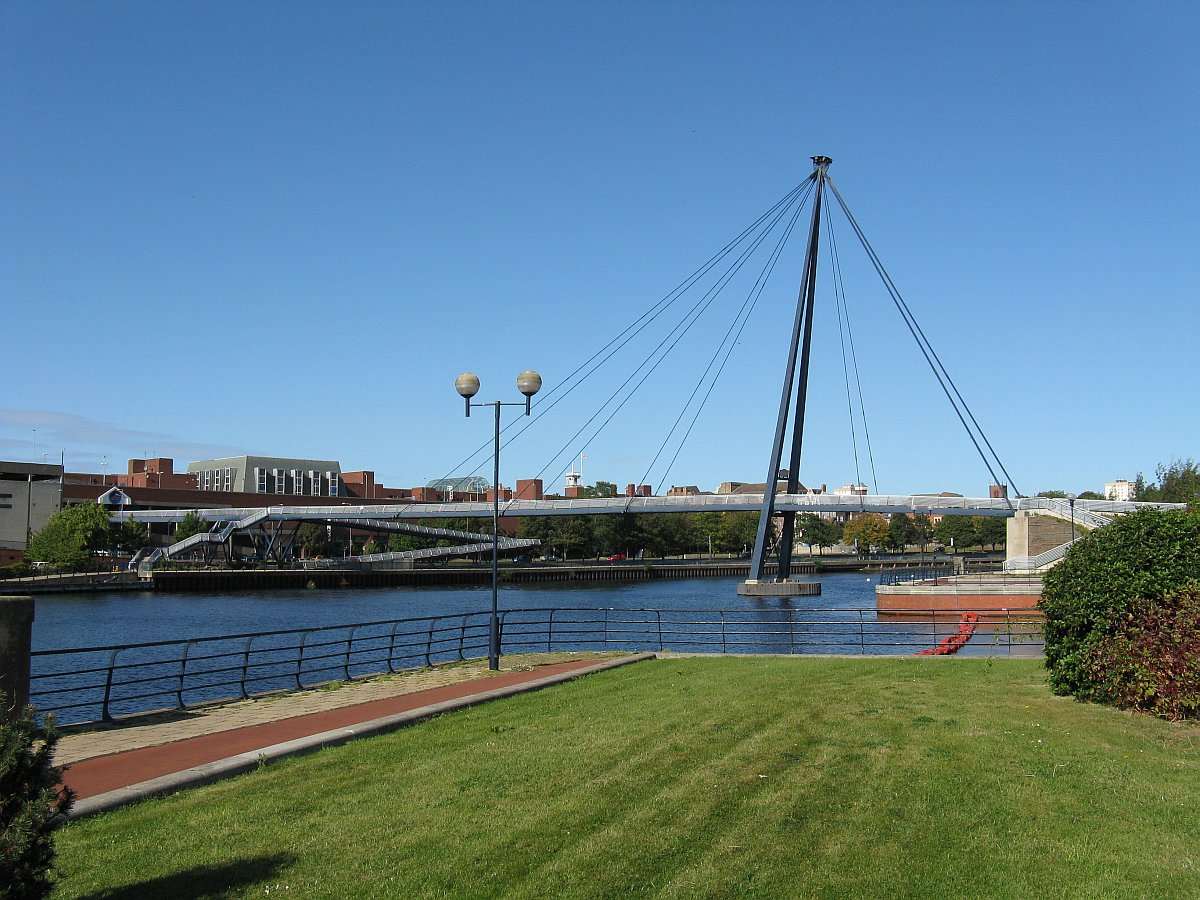
- Teesquay Millennium Footbridge
- Coordinates: 54°33′44.5″N 1°18′35.2″W
- Carries: Pedestrians
- Crosses: Teesdale Way, River Tees, Riverside Road
- Locale: Stockton-on-Tees, England
- Official name: Teesquay Millennium Footbridge
- Preceded by: Victoria Bridge
- Followed by: Princess of Wales Bridge

Characteristics
- Design: Cable-stayed bridge
- Material: Steel and concrete
- Width: 2.7 metres (9 ft)
- No. of spans: 4
- Piers in water: 1

History
- Architect: Yee Associates
- Designer: Ove Arup
- Constructed by: Birse Construction
- Construction end: December 2000
- Inaugurated: 20 December 2000

Teesquay Millennium Footbridge is a footbridge crossing east–west over the River Tees between Stockton high street and Thornaby (Teesdale Business Park) in Northern England. It is just east of Stockton town centre and in the town's namesake borough.

The bridge crosses the Teesdale Way cycle route, River Tees, and the A1035 Riverside Road. Funding for the bridge was from Stockton-on-Tees Council, the European Regional Development Fund, One NorthEast, and English Partnerships.

Teesquay Millennium Footbridge is also referred to as the Millennium Bridge.

== Design ==
Stockton Borough Council provided a brief for a 'design and build' competition to construct a pedestrian bridge across the River Tees. The 'design and build' competition was won by a team comprising Ove Arup and Birse Construction. Their entry was the only one to satisfy the local council's strictly limited budget.

The bridge has a cable-stayed design with architecture by Yee Associates and designed by Ove Arup, whereas the identification signage on the bridge states that it was designed by the constructor, Birse Construction. It has a 40-metre (131 ft) 'A' frame pylon/mast with fanned cables and has a total span of 153 m (502 ft). The walkway is 2.7 m (9 ft) wide narrowing to 2 m (7 ft) on the extension over Riverside Road to the Castlegate Centre.

== Construction ==
The bridge was fabricated in Spain, constructed on site by Birse Construction North East and completed in December 2000 at a cost of £1.4m.

== Operation ==
The bridge was opened on 20 December 2000 by Dari Taylor, Member of Parliament for Stockton South, and the mayor of Stockton-on-Tees. The Teesgate Millennium Footbridge was one of the few number of millennium footbridges to be actually completed in the millennium year, but unlike some high-profile millennium footbridges it was not funded by the Millennium Commission.

The bridge has been criticised for both wobbling and being too narrow to accommodate cyclists who are required to dismount and are barred from entering the Castlegate Centre in any case.

== Castlegate Quay ==
Up-river on Castlegate Quay by the western side of the bridge there is the Castlegate Quay Watersports Centre.

== Photo gallery ==
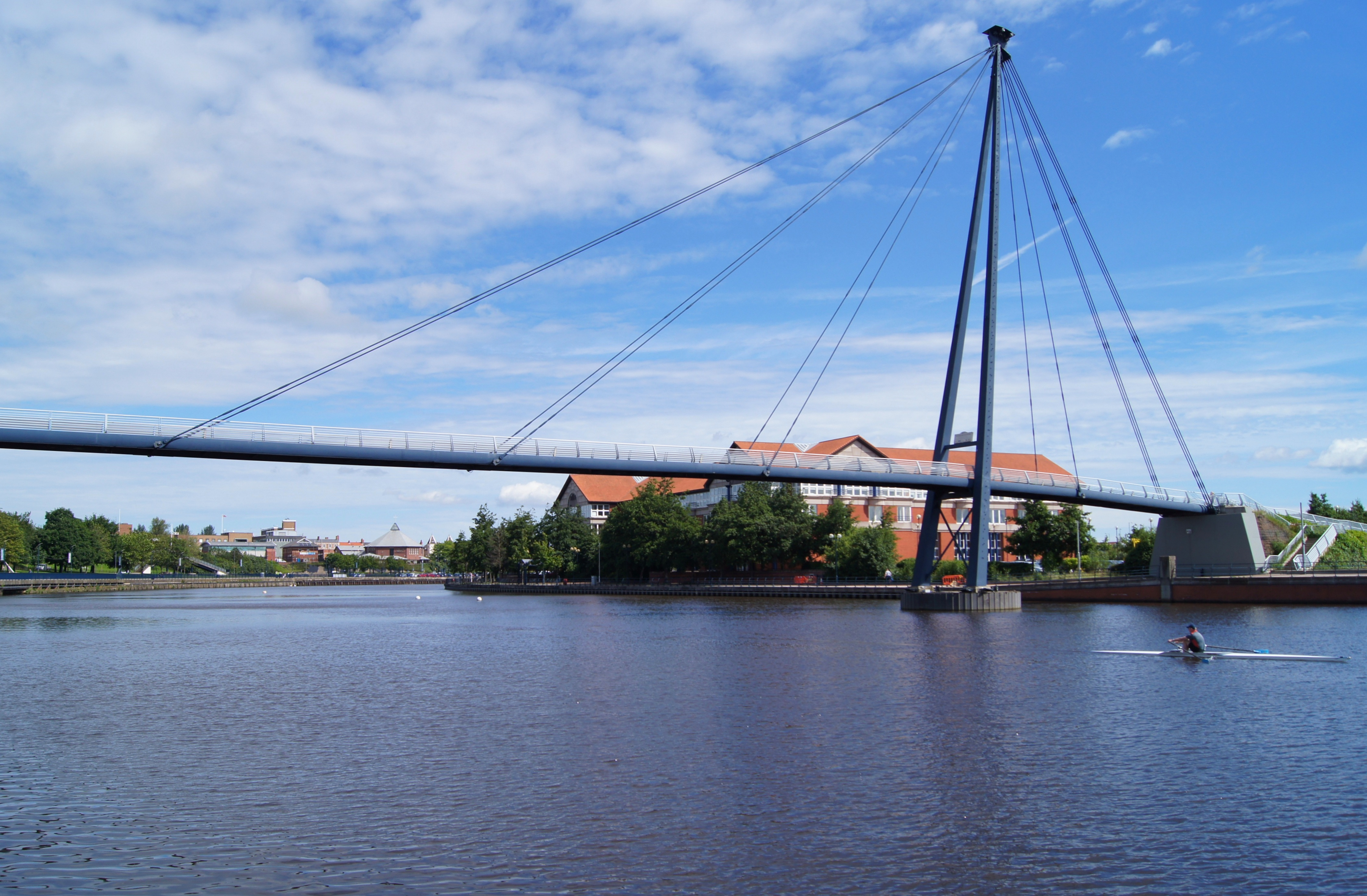
A rower under the Teesquay Millennium Bridge

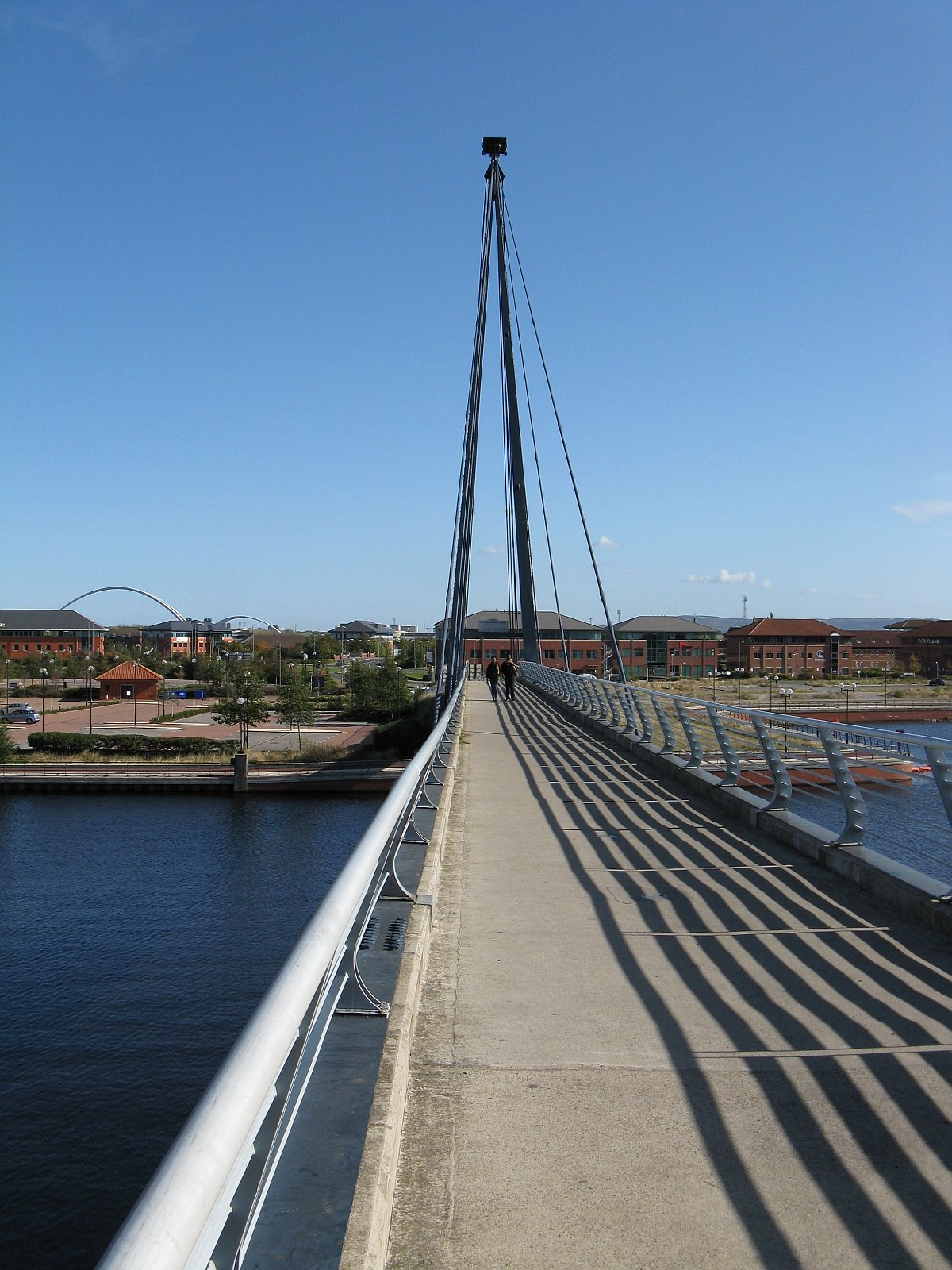
View along the deck towards Teesdale Business Park

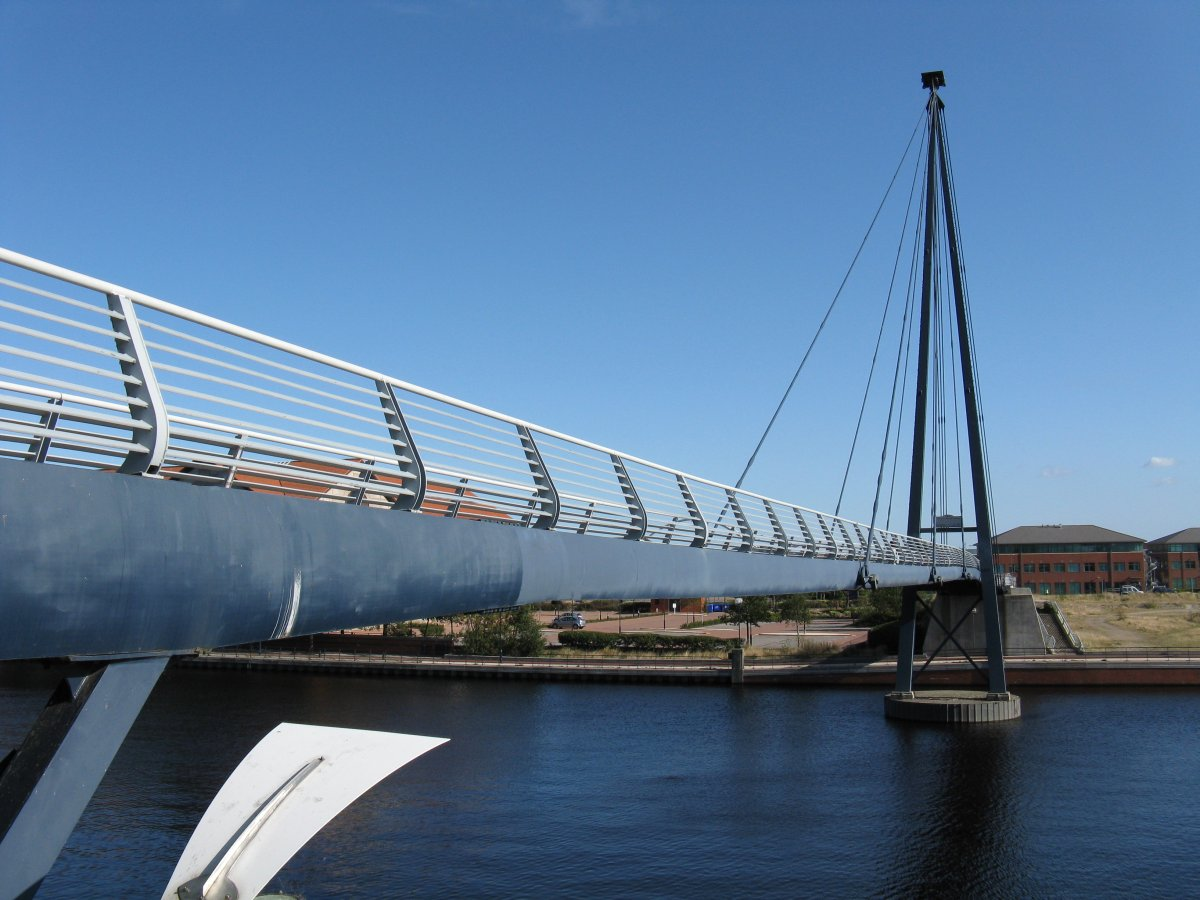
View from the steel steps on the Castlegate Quay side

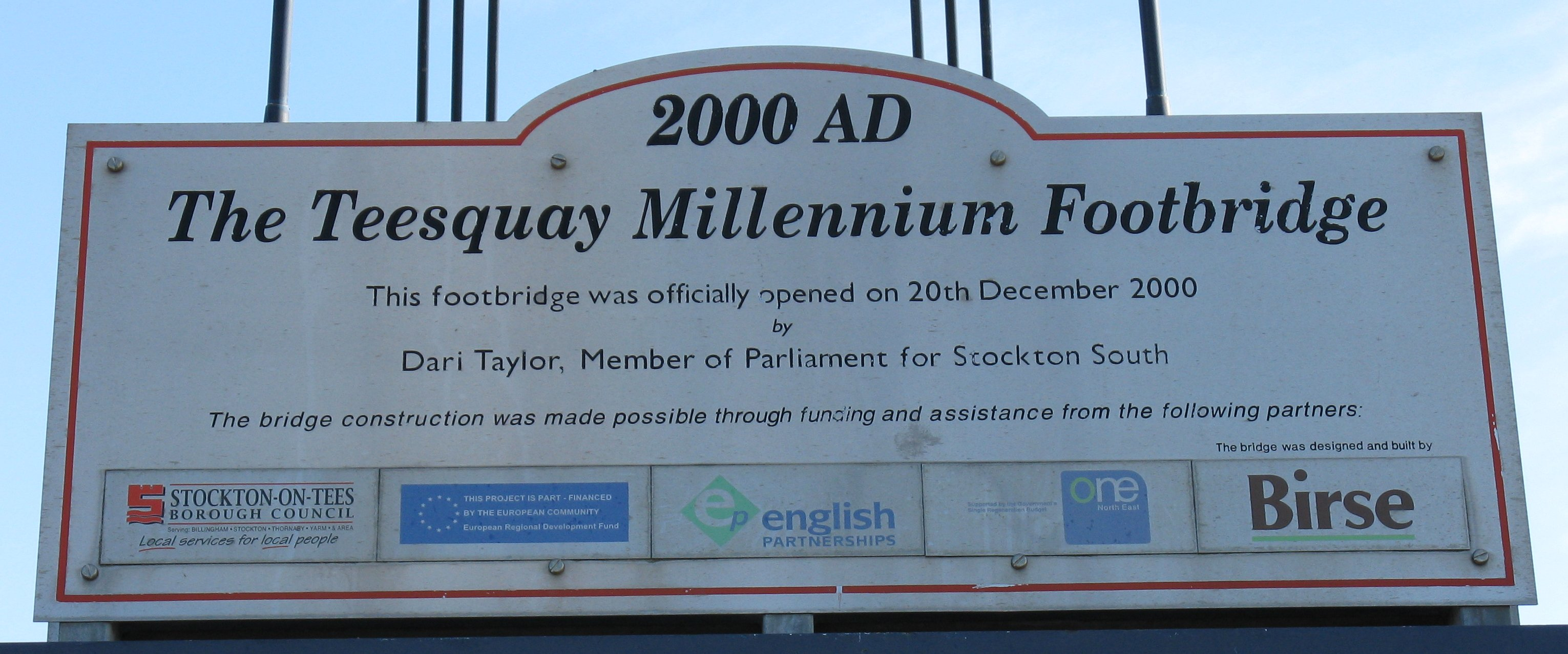
Information board on the bridge pylon

== See also ==
- Other Millennium Bridges.
