= Teesdale Way =

Long-distance walking route in England

Coordinates: 54.617°N 1.1°W

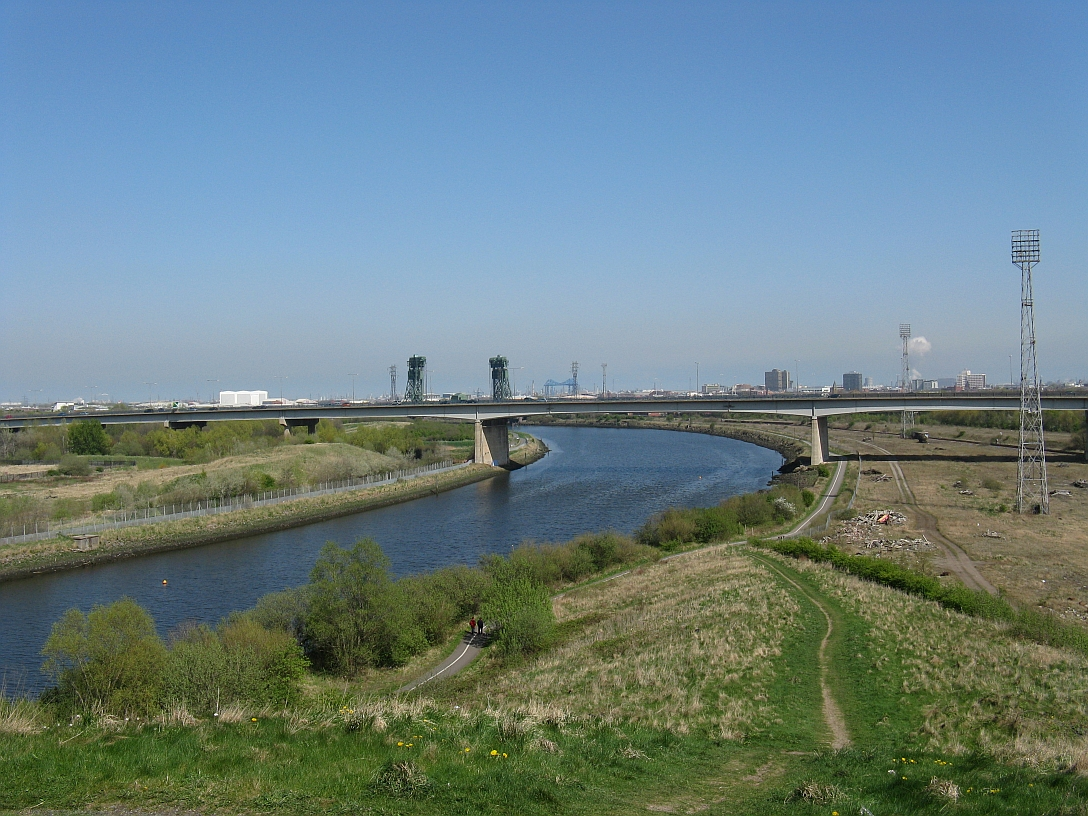
- The Teesdale way in the Tees Corridor
- Length: 100 miles (160 km) from Dufton; 90 miles (140 km) from county boundaries
- Trailheads: Dufton, Cumbria/Middleton-in-Teesdale, County Durham; South Gare, Redcar
- Use: Hiking
- Waymark: 'Dipper Badge'

The Teesdale Way is a long-distance walk between the Cumbrian Pennines and the North Sea coast of North Yorkshire in England. The walk is 100 miles (160 km) in length; it links in with other long-distance walks such as the Pennine Way and the E2 European Walk between Harwich and Stranraer.

== The route ==
The Teesdale way starts at Dufton in Cumbria as part of the Pennine way, but does not become its own path (with waymarkers) until it reaches Middleton-in-Teesdale. The path ends at South Gare in Warrenby near Redcar, having passed through the heavily industrialised Teesside area, consisting of Middlesbrough, Stockton-on-Tees and Thornaby-on-Tees. This gives an insight into the once ship building and industrial heritage of the North East. Between Middleton-in-Teesdale and Middlesbrough, the way runs for 67 miles (108 km) jointly with the European E2 path.

Between Yarm and Croft-on-Tees the river goes through the meandering lowland section of the Tees Valley. As the river flows through Upper Teesdale, it passes through the historic settlements of Piercebridge and Barnard Castle.

The route can also be seen as starting at the county boundaries between Cumbria and County Durham near to Cow Green Reservoir. Also in Upper Teesdale the walk makes a U-turn at Eggleston Hall, heading down the other side of the dale, back to Barnard Castle.

Thornaby and Bassleton woods are connected to each other. They are located in Thornaby, in the Borough of Stockton-on-Tees. A 4-mile (6.4 km) section of the way between Middlesbrough and Redcar was known locally as 'The Black Path' and was used by steelworkers.

At 17 acres (6.9 ha), Thornaby Woods is a large area of ancient woodland and features trees such as oak, elm and wych-elm. Roe deer have been seen in and around Thornaby and Bassleton woods.

== Sights and attractions ==
=== Industrial Teesside ===
- Teesside Steel Works, Lackenby
- Riverside Stadium, Middlesbrough
- Middlesbrough Transporter Bridge

=== Tees Corridor ===
- Teessaurus Park
- Tees Newport Bridge
- A19 Tees Viaduct
- Tees Barrage and Tees Barrage International White Water Course
- Infinity Bridge
- Princess of Wales Bridge
- Teesquay Millennium Bridge
- Victoria Bridge

=== Nature reserves ===
- Maze Park Nature Reserve, Middlesbrough
- Black Bobbies Field Nature Reserve, Thornaby-on-Tees
- Bowesfield Nature Reserve, Thornaby-on-Tees
- Bassleton Wood, Thornaby-on-Tees
- Gainford Spa Nature Reserve, Gainford

=== Waterfalls ===
- High Cup Nick
- Cauldron Snout
- High Force
- Low Force

=== Museums ===
- Great Holme Museum, Eaglescliffe
- Bowes Museum, Barnard Castle

=== Stately homes ===
- Rokeby Park, Whorlton
- Eggleston Hall

=== Ruins ===
- Medieval village of Newsham
- Sockburn Church Ruins
- Castle Hill, Blackwell
- Baydale Chapel Ruins
- Gainforth Mill
- Piercebridge Roman Fort
- Piercebridge Roman Bridge
- Mortham Tower, near Greta Bridge
- Egglestone Abbey
- Cotherstone Castle

=== Village churches ===
- St John's Church, Low Dinsdale
- All Saints Church, Girsby
- All Saints Church, Hurworth-on-Tees
- St Peter's Church, Croft-on-Tees
- St Edwin's Church, Coniscliffe
- St Mary's Church, Piercebridge
- St Mary's Church, Gainford
- St Andrew's Church, Winston
- St Mary's Church, Whorton
- St Romald's Church, Romaldkirk

=== Other ===
- South Gare
- Butterfly World, Eaglescliffe
- Whorlton Lido
- Deepdale Aqueduct
- Octagonal Market Cross, Barnard Castle.

== Settlements ==
- Dufton
- Middleton-in-Teesdale
- Eggleston
- Romaldkirk
- Startforth
- Barnard Castle
- Whorlton
- Winston
- Gainford
- Piercebridge
- Carlbury
- High Coniscliffe
- Merrybent
- Low Coniscliffe
- Blackwell
- Stapleton
- Croft-on-Tees
- Hurworth Place
- Hurworth-on-Tees

- Neasham
- Sockburn
- Girsby
- Low Dinsdale
- Over Dinsdale
- Middleton St George
- Middleton One Row
- Low Worsall
- Aislaby
- Yarm
- Eaglescliffe
- Preston-on-Tees
- Thornaby-on-Tees
- Stockton-on-Tees
- Middlesbrough
- North Ormesby
- Dormanstown
- Warrenby
