= Tees Valley Regeneration =

Former regeneration body in England

Coordinates: 54°33′54.5″N 1°18′22.4″W

Teesside Valley Regeneration
- Formation: 2002
- Dissolved: 2010
- Headquarters: Cavendish House; Teesdale Business Park, Thornaby-on-Tees
- Official language: English
- former Chief executive: Joe Docherty
- Website: Tees Valley Regeneration

Tees Valley Regeneration was an urban regeneration company covering the Tees Valley area of North East England and at one time was the largest urban development agency in England. The headquarters were at Cavendish House, Teesdale Business Park in Thornaby-on-Tees.

Tees Valley Regeneration started in 2002, operated for seven years under the leadership of Joe Docherty, who left the organisation in 2009, and closed in 2010; responsibility for regeneration was transferred to local councils.

== Projects ==
Tees Valley Regeneration's main regeneration projects were:

- Central Park in Darlington, including the new Darlington College.
- Skylink International Business Park at Durham Tees Valley Airport.
- Middlehaven in Middlesbrough, in particular the development of the new Middlesbrough College and Anish Kapoor's Temenos in Middlehaven Dock, one of the Tees Valley Giants.
- North Shore in Stockton-on-Tees, in particular the development of Infinity Bridge, expansion of Durham University's Queen's Campus and the North Shore development.
- Victoria Harbour in Hartlepool.

== See also ==
- Tees Valley

Other local and regional development agencies

- One NorthEast (closed 2012)
- SMi - Stockton Middlesbrough Initiative
- Teesside Development Corporation (defunct 1998).
- Middlesbrough Development Corporation
- Hartlepool Development Corporation
