= Infinity Bridge =

Footbridge over the River Tees, England

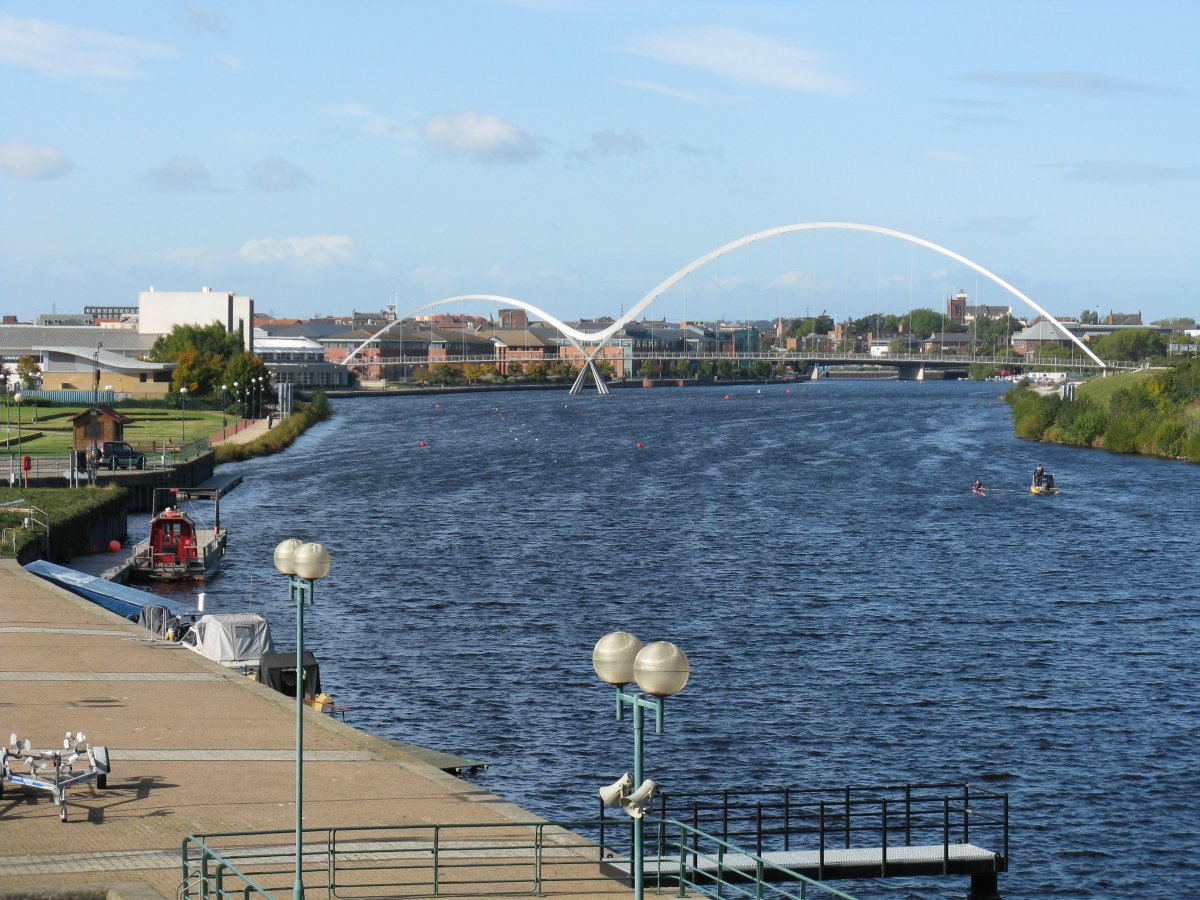
- Infinity Bridge from the Tees Barrage, named after the $\infty$ symbol denoting infinity
- Coordinates: 54°33′53.26″N 1°17′57.09″W
- Carries: Pedestrians and cyclists
- Crosses: River Tees, Teesdale Way
- Locale: Stockton-on-Tees, England
- Official name: Infinity Bridge
- Owner: Stockton-on-Tees Borough Council
- Preceded by: Princess of Wales Bridge
- Followed by: Tees Barrage

Characteristics
- Design: Asymmetric double tied-arch and suspended deck
- Material: Weathering steel, stainless steel and reinforced concrete
- Total length: 240 metres (787 ft)
- Width: 5 metres (16 ft)
- Height: 40 metres (131 ft)
- Longest span: 120 metres (394 ft)
- No. of spans: 2 river spans and 8 minor spans on approaches
- Piers in water: 1
- Clearance below: 8 metres (26 ft)
- Design life: 120 years

History
- Contracted lead designer: Expedition Engineering
- Successful competition design: Expedition Engineering and Spence Associates
- Constructed by: Balfour Beatty
- Fabrication by: Cleveland Bridge & Engineering Company
- Construction start: June 2007
- Construction end: December 2008
- Construction cost: £15m
- Opened: 16 May 2009
- Inaugurated: 14 May 2009

Statistics
- Daily traffic: 4,000 people/day anticipated

Location
- Interactive map of Infinity Bridge

The Infinity Bridge is a public pedestrian and cycle footbridge across the River Tees in the borough of Stockton-on-Tees in northern England. The bridge is situated one kilometre downriver of Stockton town centre, between the Princess of Wales Bridge and the Tees Barrage. It connects the Teesdale Business Park and the University of Durham's Queen's Campus in Thornaby-on-Tees on the south bank of the Tees with the Tees Valley Regeneration's £320 million North Shore development on the north bank.

Built at a cost of £15 million with funding from Stockton Borough Council, English Partnerships and its successor body the Homes and Communities Agency, One NorthEast, and the European Regional Development Fund the bridge is a major part of the North Shore Redevelopment Project undertaken by Tees Valley Regeneration.

The bridge had the project title North Shore Footbridge before being given its official name Infinity Bridge, chosen by a panel of representatives from the funding bodies, from a pool of names suggested by the public.

The name derives from the infinity symbol ($\infty$) formed by the bridge and its reflection.

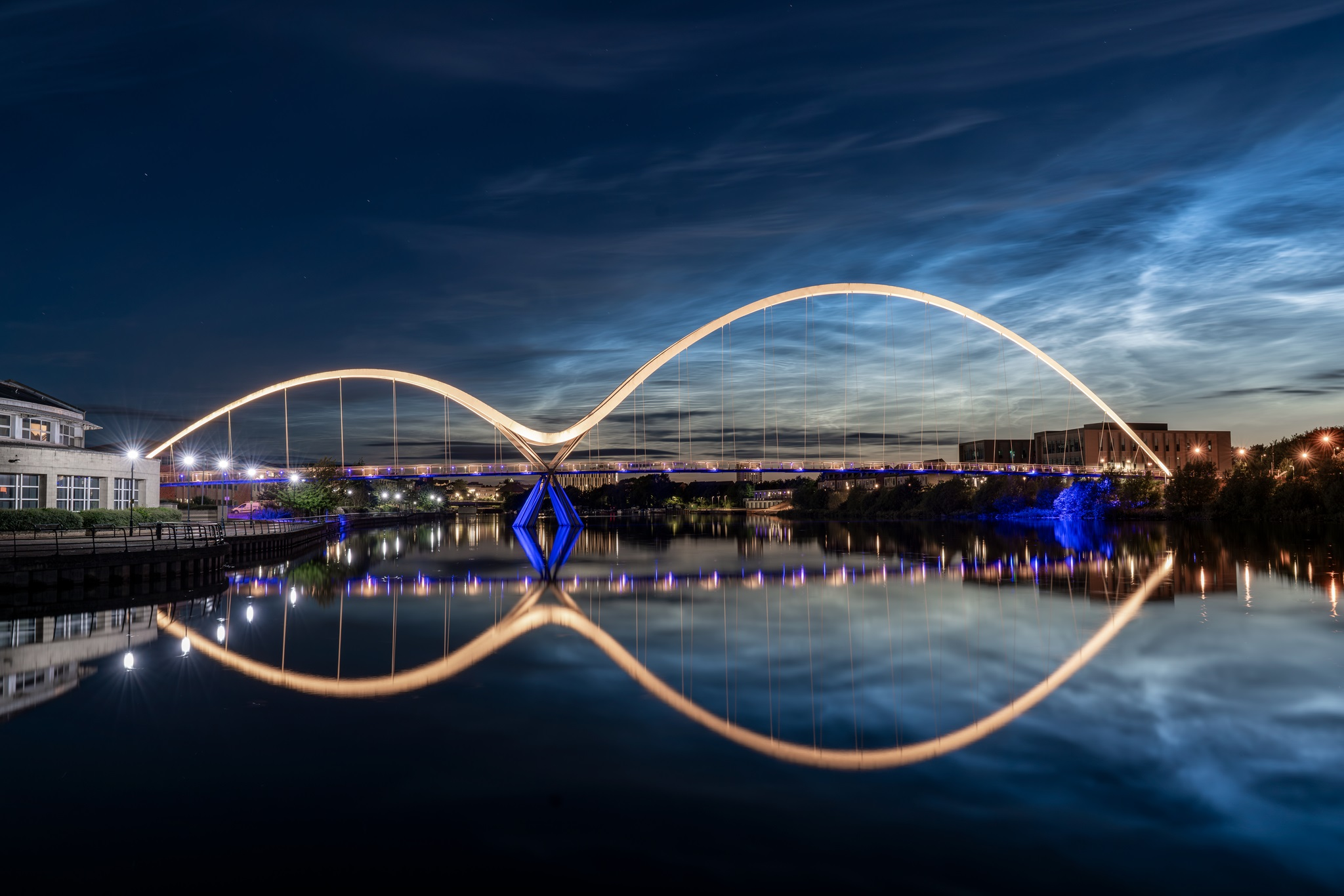
The Infinity Bridge, Stockton-on-Tees illuminated after sunset showing the infinity symbol reflection with rare noctilucent clouds across the sky.

== Design ==
Initial investigations for the footbridge were done by the White Young Green Group, who with English Partnerships produced a brief for an international architectural design competition, organised with RIBA Competitions and launched in April 2003.

The brief was for a "prestigious" and "iconic" "landmark" footbridge at North Shore Stockton, to cross the River Tees, which is 125 metres (410 ft) wide at that point.

More than 200 submissions were made to the RIBA Competition; from these a shortlist of five was selected. The successful competition design was by Expedition Engineering and Spence Associates.

The subsequent design was led by Expedition Engineering assisted by Arup Materials, Balfour Beatty Regional Civil Engineering, Black and Veatch, Bridon, University of Cambridge, Cleveland Bridge UK, Dorman Long Technology, Flint & Neill, Formfab, GCG, GERB, Imperial College, RWDI, Spence Associates, Speirs & Major, Stainton, and William Cook. White Young Green were project managers.

English Partnerships appointed Flint & Neill Limited to carry out a Category III independent check of the bridge design, including loading, wind tunnel testing, and investigation of failure modes. A number of aspects fall outside current standards. The bridge has a 120-year design life.

=== Description ===
The bridge is a dual, tied arch bridge or bowstring bridge. It has a pair of continuous, differently-sized structural steel arches with suspended precast concrete decking and one asymmetrically placed river pier. The tapering arches with a trapezoidal box section are fabricated from weathering steel plate.

Each of the arches bifurcates within the spans to form a double rib over the river pier.

A reflex piece between the two arches holds them together, making the two arches one continuous curve. No other bridge is known to have quite the same design.

The offset river pier is to accommodate water sports and leisure craft to one side. The river pier is supported by an 11.5 m square by 2.5 m thick pile cap on sixteen 1 m diameter hollow steel pipe piles. On the pile cap beneath the water line are four 3 m cylindrical concrete legs, onto which are bolted and welded the four inclined grey steel legs visible above water. Riprap covers the river bed around the river pier for scour protection against the large flows when the Tees Barrage downstream discharges.

Each of the two concrete riverside piers are supported on four 500 mm hollow steel piles and a pile cap.

The bridge as initially proposed was to have been some 272 m long. It was originally designed with a northern approach 38 m long and a southern approach of 54 m; however, the design of the north side of the bridge was later simplified and the bridge's northern approach shortened. The design of the southern approach is largely unaltered and has a staircase connecting it directly to the river frontage.

The bridge deck is 5 m wide and 4 m between its custom-made handrails.

The main arch of the bridge is 120 m long, weighing 300 tonnes, and 32 m tall, with its top 40 m above the Tees. The short arch is 60 m long and 16 m tall. The hangers (droppers) are spaced 7.5 m apart and are made from 30 mm diameter, high-strength, locked-coil steel cable.

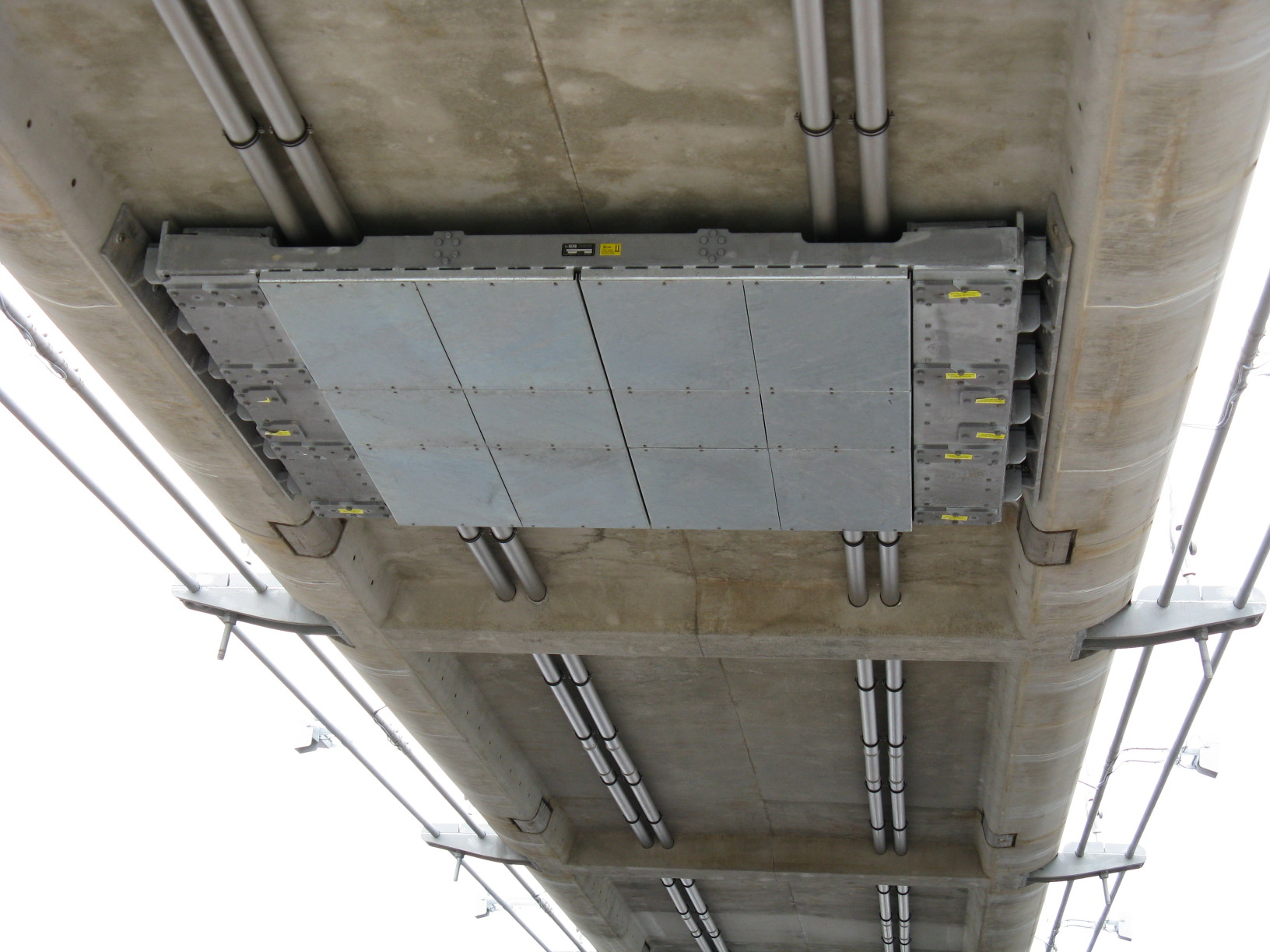
Single-tuned mass damper fitted to the underside of the concrete decking of the smaller arch of the bridge.

Four exposed, high-strength, post-tensioned, locked-coil steel-tie cables run alongside the deck and tie the bases of the arches together, pre-stressing the concrete deck sections. The tie cables are 90 mm diameter on the large arch and 65 mm on the smaller.

The aggregate concrete deck sections are 7.5 m long and down to 125 mm thick in places, making it one of the thinnest bridge walking surfaces.

The handrails and parapet are stainless steel while the balustrade is made from stainless steel wire.

To ensure any bridge oscillation is controlled, the deck is fitted to the underside with seven tuned mass dampers – one on the short arch, and six on the larger weighing 5 tonnes in all. The mass dampers control horizontal as well as vertical oscillations – a feature only required on very slender bridges. There is provision for the addition of further dampers when the issue of maintenance arises.

The clearance (heading) below the decking on the navigable part of the river is 8 m.

=== Illumination ===
A special feature is made of the way the bridge is lit at night. This lighting scheme was designed by Speirs and Major Associates who also designed the lighting for the Burj Al-Arab. At night the bridge handrail and footway are lit with custom-made blue-and-white LED lighting built into the handrail that changes colour as pedestrians cross the bridge; sensors trigger a change from blue to white, leaving a 'comet's trail' in the person's wake. Attached to the steel cable ties are white metal-halide up-lighters to illuminate the white painted bridge arches, and blue LED down-lighters to illuminate the water and ground surfaces immediately below the deck. At night from certain viewing angles when the river surface is flat calm, the twin arches together with their reflection in the river appear as an infinity symbol $\infty$, and it is this effect that inspired its name.

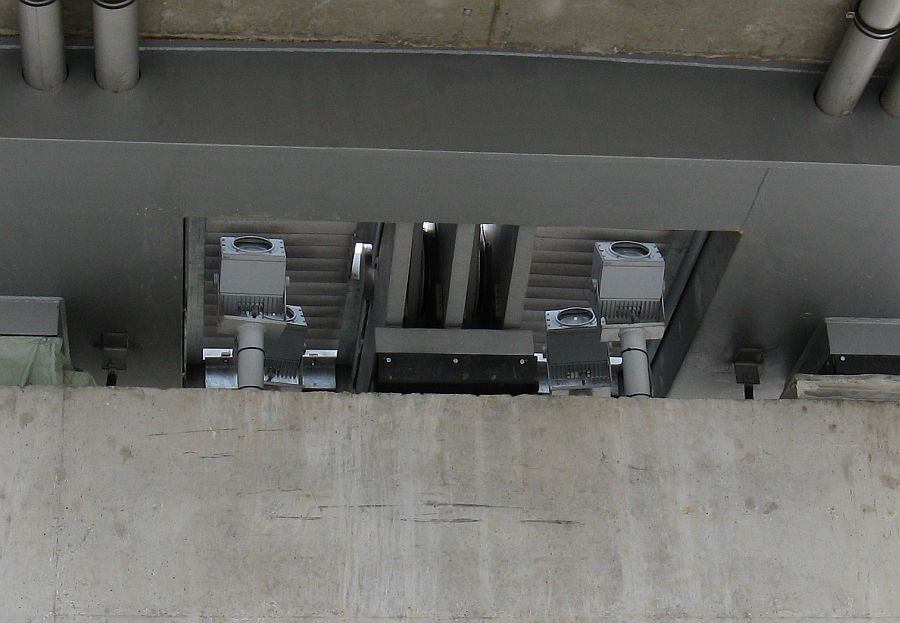
Uplighters on the southern riverside pier illuminating the southern end of the arch

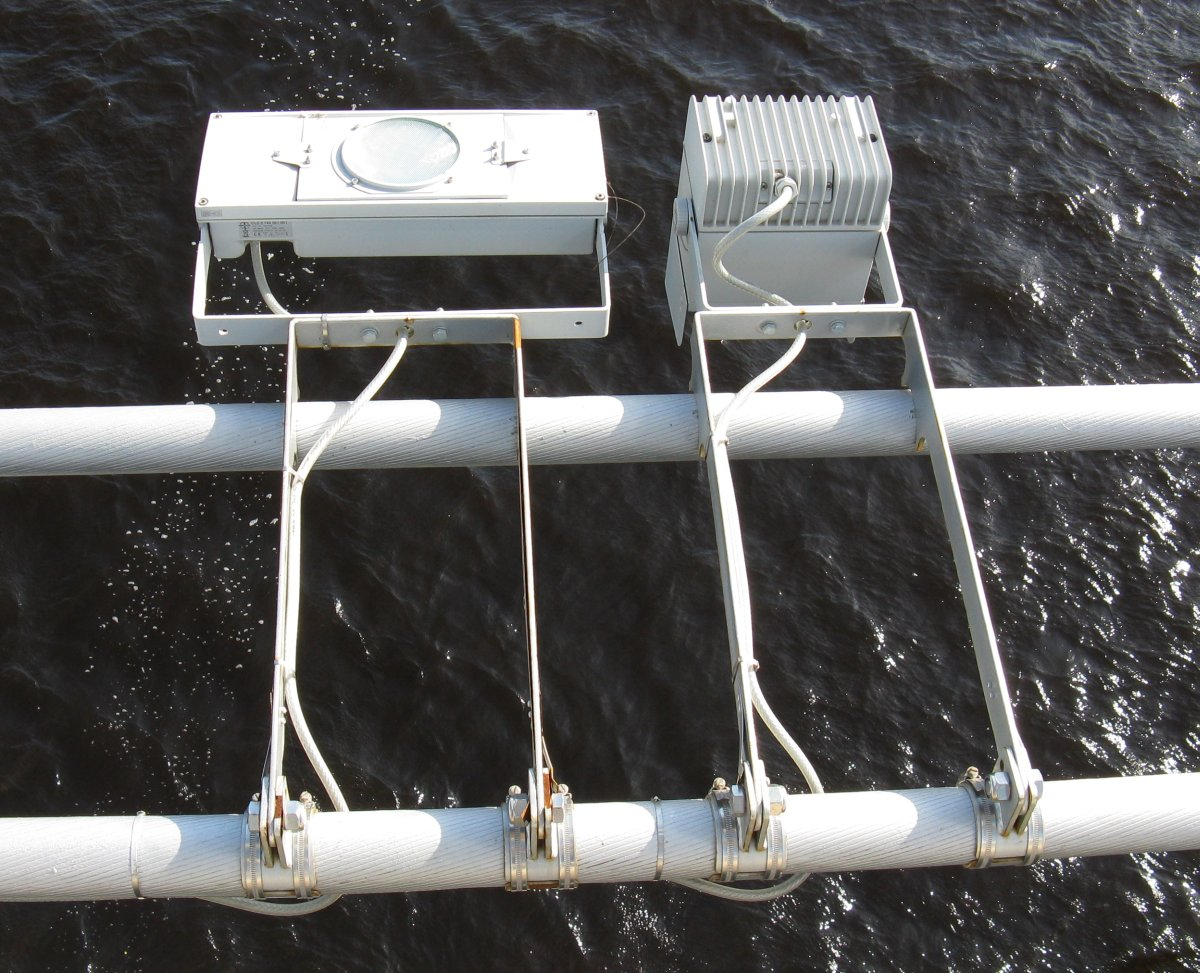
White metal halide up-lighters and blue LED down-lighters, attached to two steel tie cables running along either side of the bridge walkway

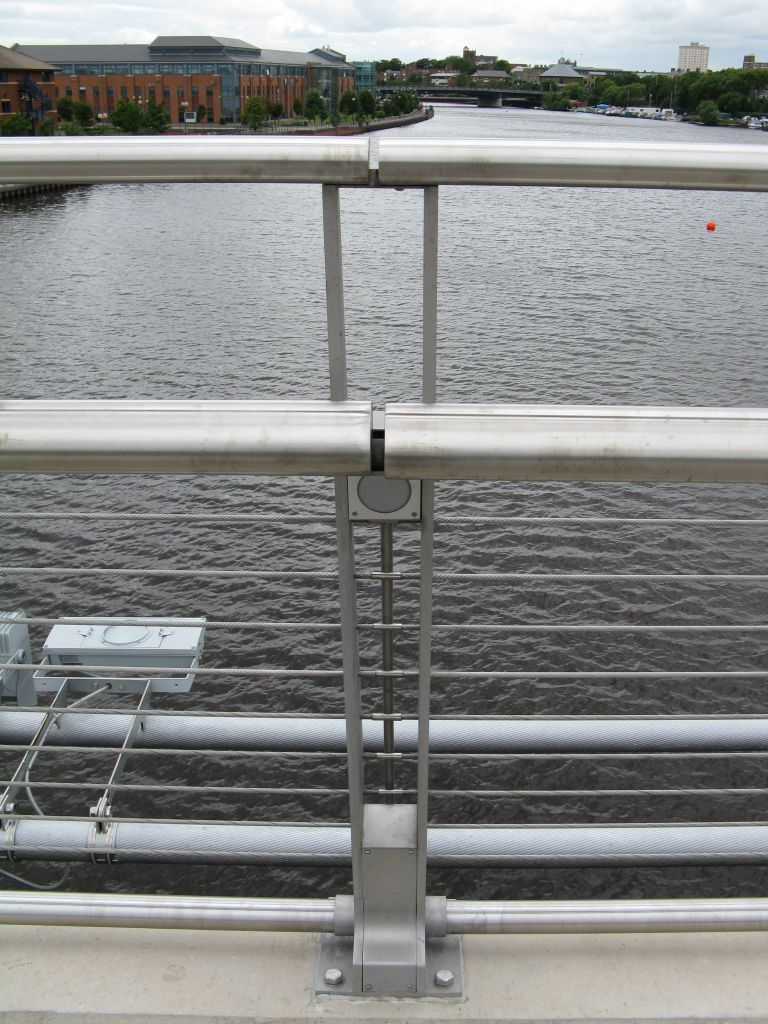
Handrail and integral custom-made walkway lighting

== Construction ==
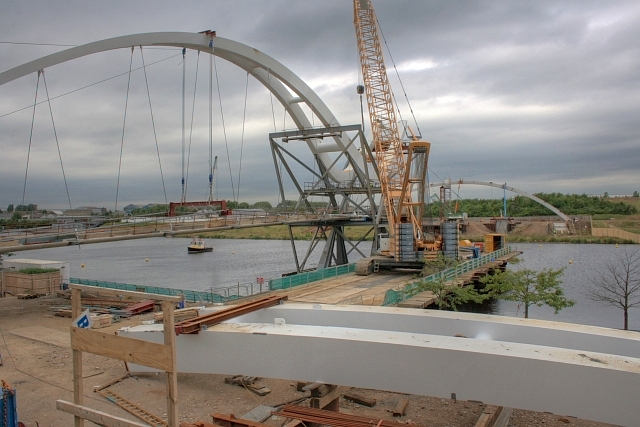
South bank of North Shore Footbridge during construction

The bridge was constructed in 18 months between June 2007 and December 2008 by site constructor Balfour Beatty Regional Civil Engineering and steel fabricator Cleveland Bridge & Engineering Company with White Young Green managing the whole project.

At the start of construction, a temporary jetty was built on the south bank to enable the building of a cofferdam for the safe construction of the central pier. In April 2008, the supporting legs were added to the central pier. Steel falsework was constructed in the cofferdam by Dorman Long to support the ends of both incomplete arches as they cantilevered over the river during construction. The first steel arch, made from four pieces of fabricated steel welded together, was put in place in June 2008 and was later used to stabilise the cantilevering lower portions of the main arch using a strand-jack and tie cable between the top of the small arch and the large arch and then to reduce sway stress during the progressive construction of the large arch. The final section of the main arch came in four pieces which were welded together on site and on 5 September 2008 all 170 tonnes of it was lifted into place by a 1,500-tonne mobile crane, the largest in the country. The crane, a Gottwald AK680 owned by Sarens UK, is based in nearby Middlesbrough. The crane is 80 metres (262 ft) high with a maximum of 1200 tonnes of superlift, requires 45 transport wagons to move it, and takes three days to set up using a 100-tonne crane.

The concrete deck panels were cast on site using three steel moulds in temporary sheds in a construction compound on the north bank of the river. Using a short temporary jetty on the north bank the deck, panels were floated out on a small barge and jacked into position, working progressively away from the river pier. The concrete deck sections are held together by steel welds and adhesive.

The footbridge was completed on time and to budget in December 2008 with 530 workers and uses in total some 450 tonnes of Corus steel, 1.5 km of locked coil steel cable, 780 lights and 5,472 bolts, and weighs 1040 tons. Almost all labour, materials and components were sourced regionally.

== Operation ==
The bridge was officially opened on 14 May 2009 with celebrations that included a sound, light and animation show, parkour freerunners who climbed the bridge arches with flares, and a specially composed music track and synchronised pyrotechnics from the bridge itself with big screens for the estimated audience of 20,000 spectators along the banks. The bridge was opened to the public two days later. Foot traffic is anticipated to rise to some four thousand people a day as the North Shore site develops.

== Awards ==
The bridge won the Institution of Structural Engineers' Supreme Award for Structural Excellence 2009, the premier structural engineering award in the UK. It also won in its own category of Pedestrian Bridges. The other awards the bridge has won include the British Constructional Steelwork Association's Structural Steel Design Award 2010, the Concrete Society Civil Engineering Award 2009, the ICE Robert Stephenson Award 2009, the North East Constructing Excellence Awards 'Project of the Year', and the Green Apple Award for the environment.

== Photo gallery ==
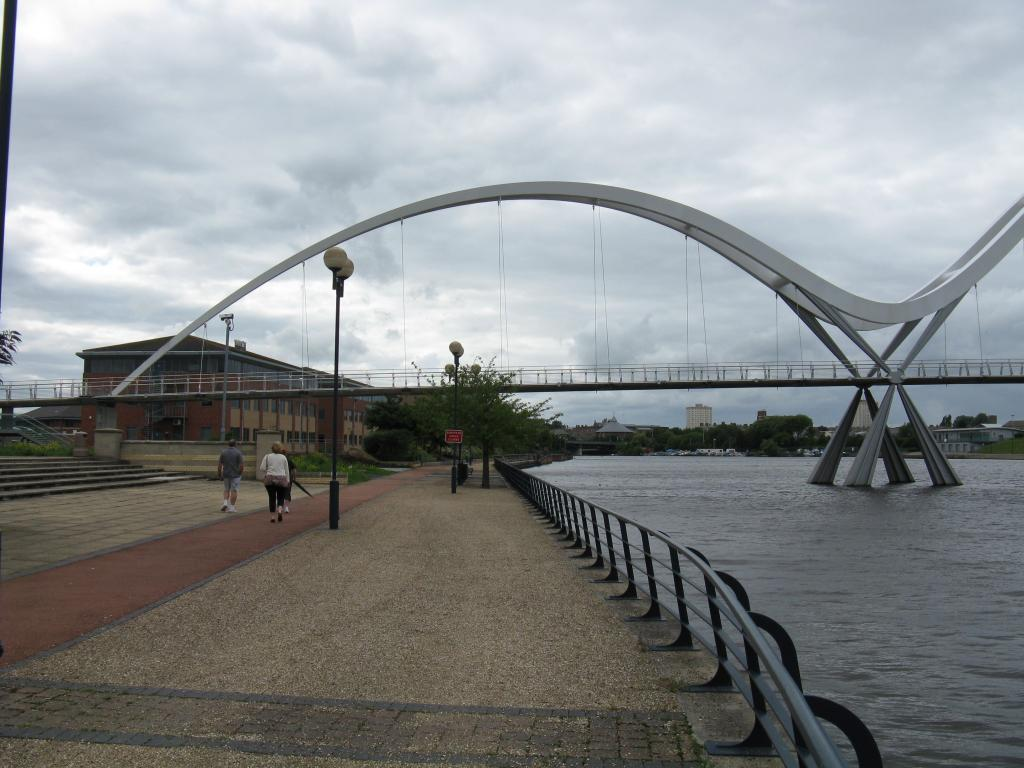
The smaller south arch

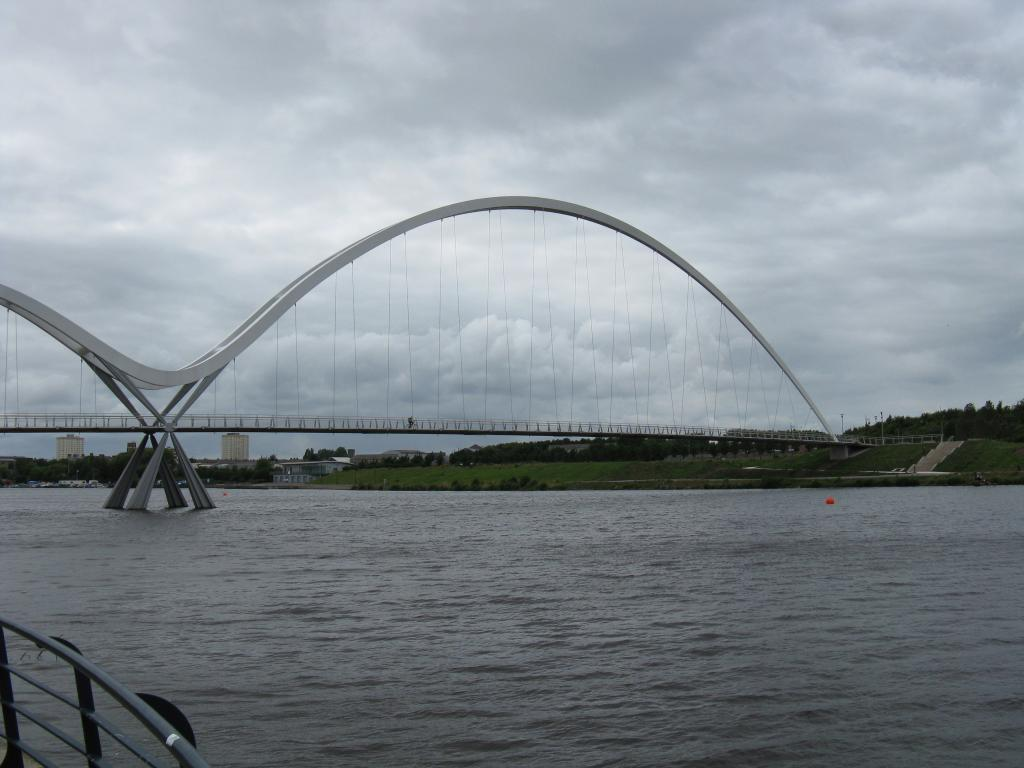
The larger north arch

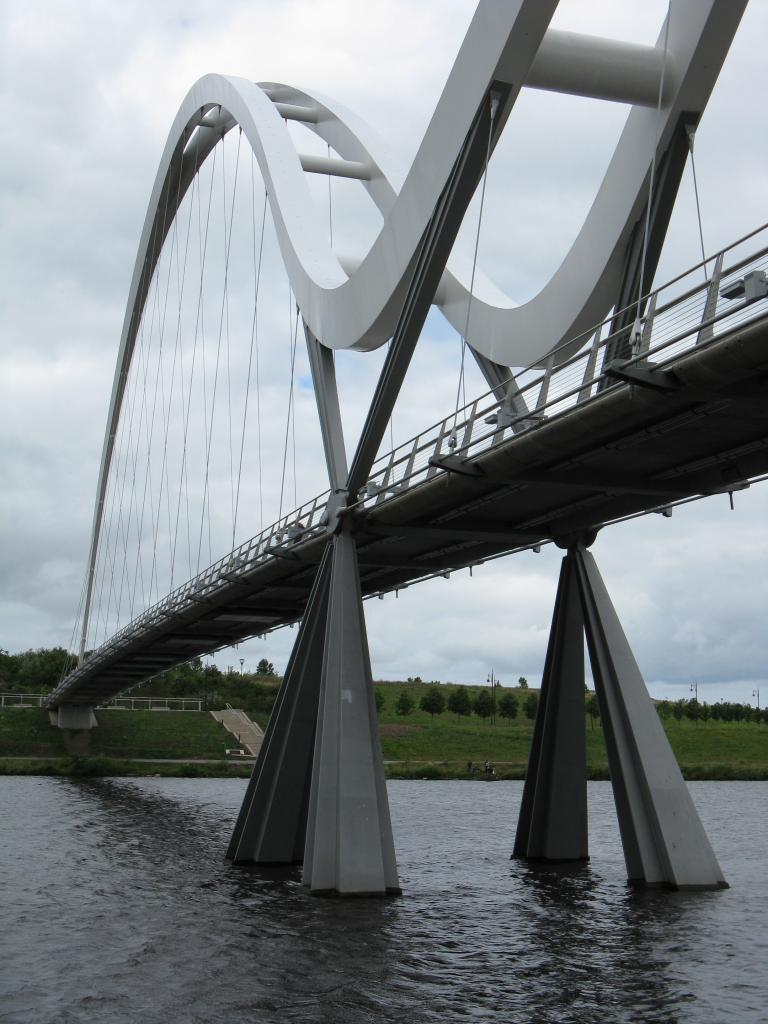
Central pier and large arch

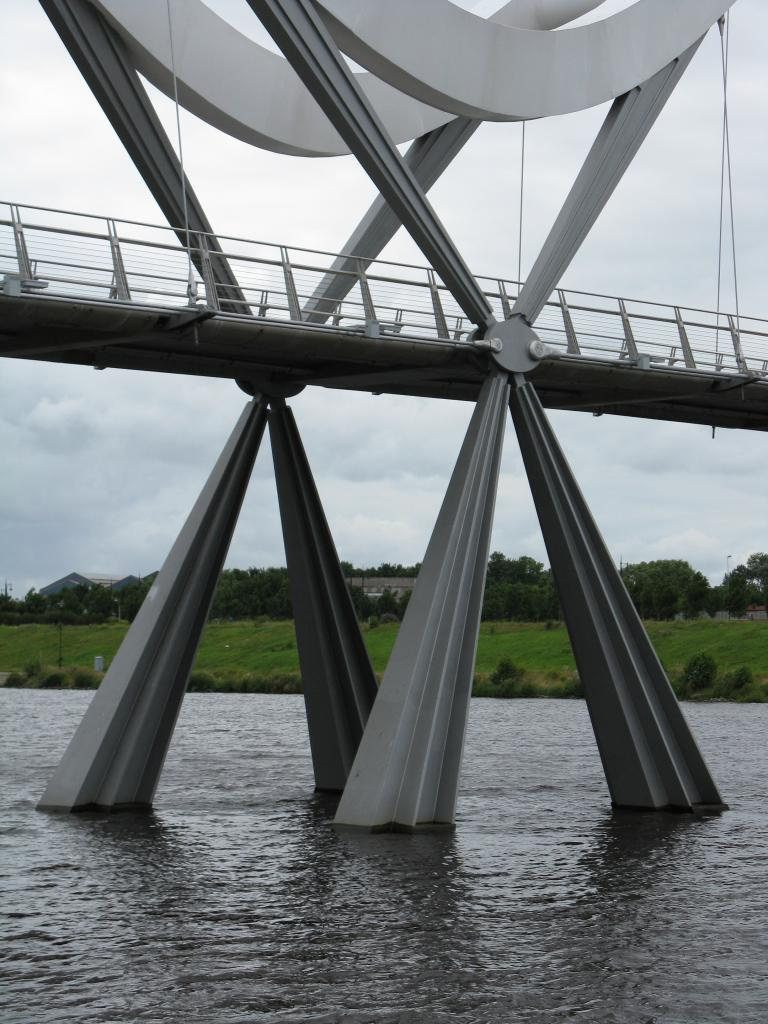
The central pier

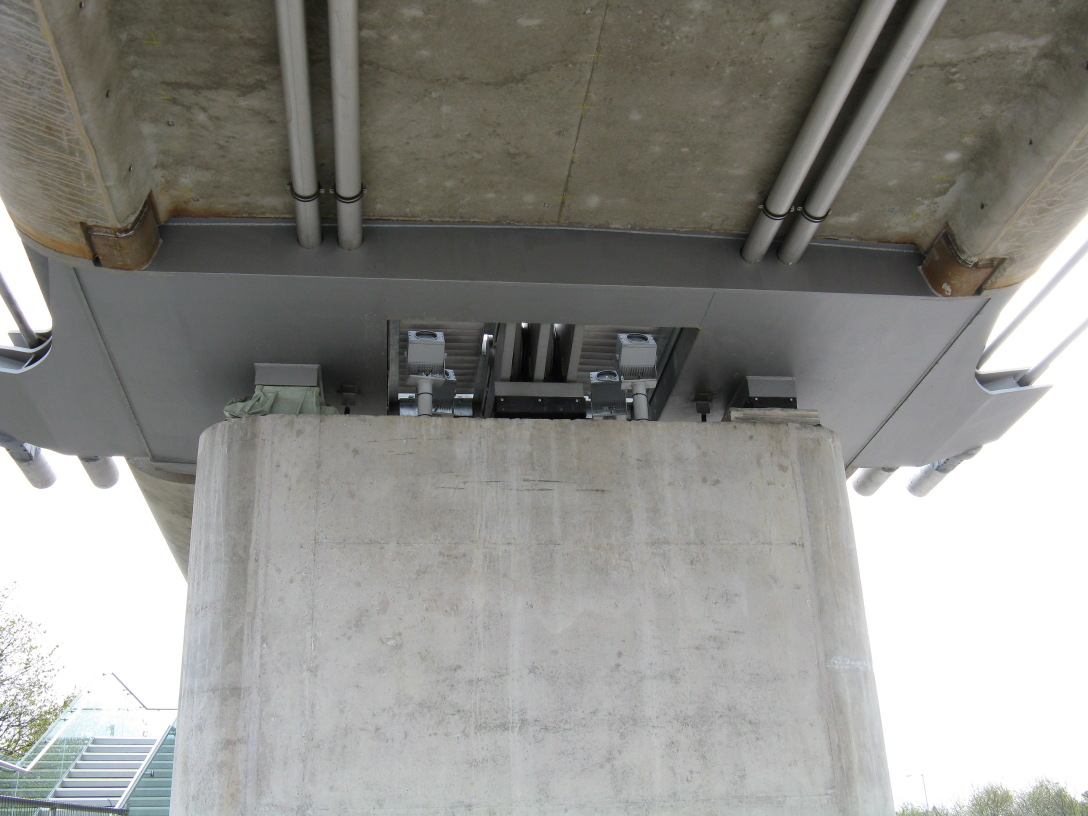
The southern riverside concrete pier with reaction plate viewed from the north side

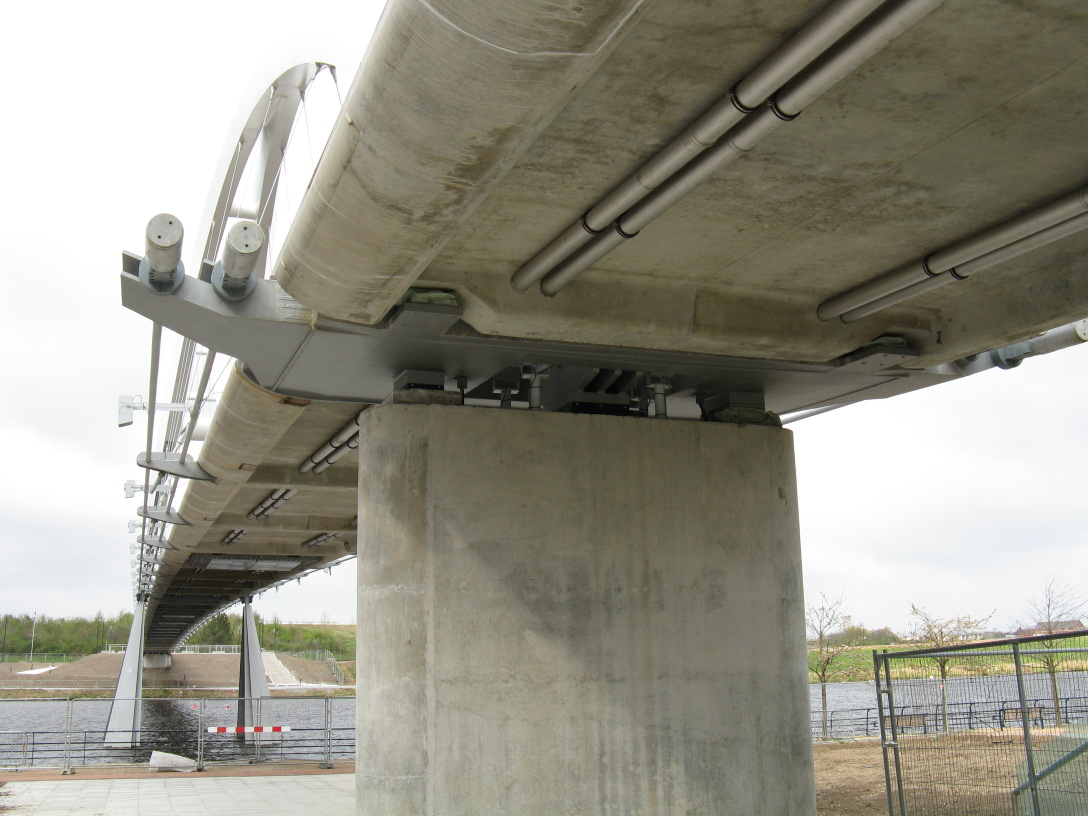
The south riverside pier and concrete decking

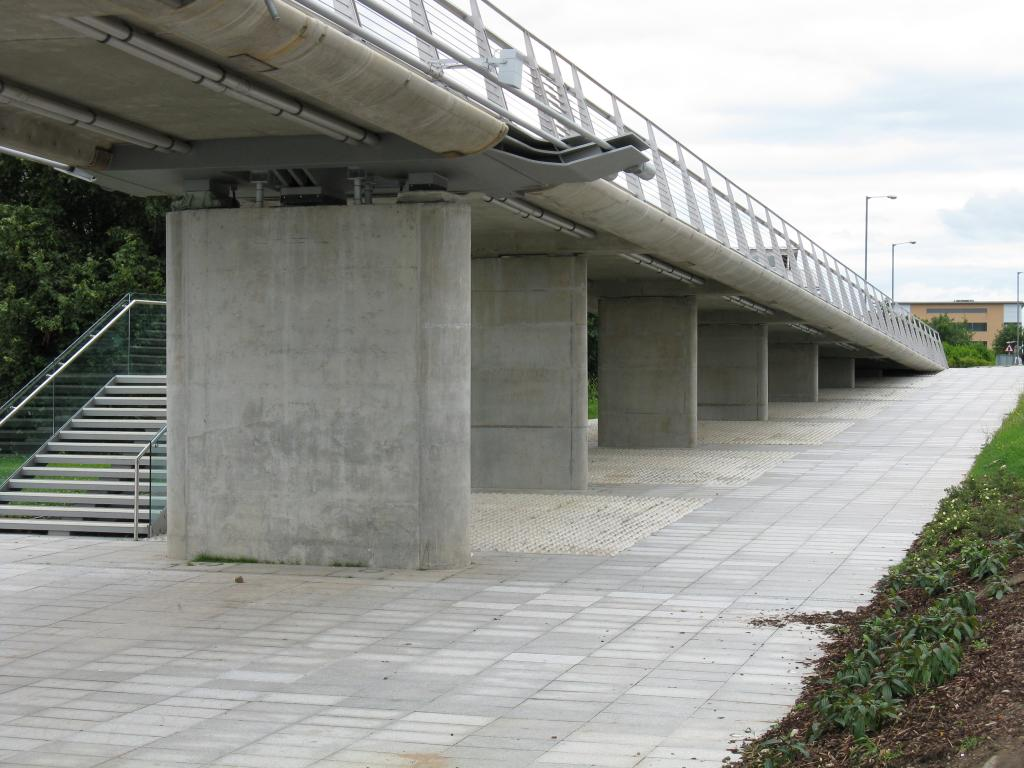
The seven south piers and approaches

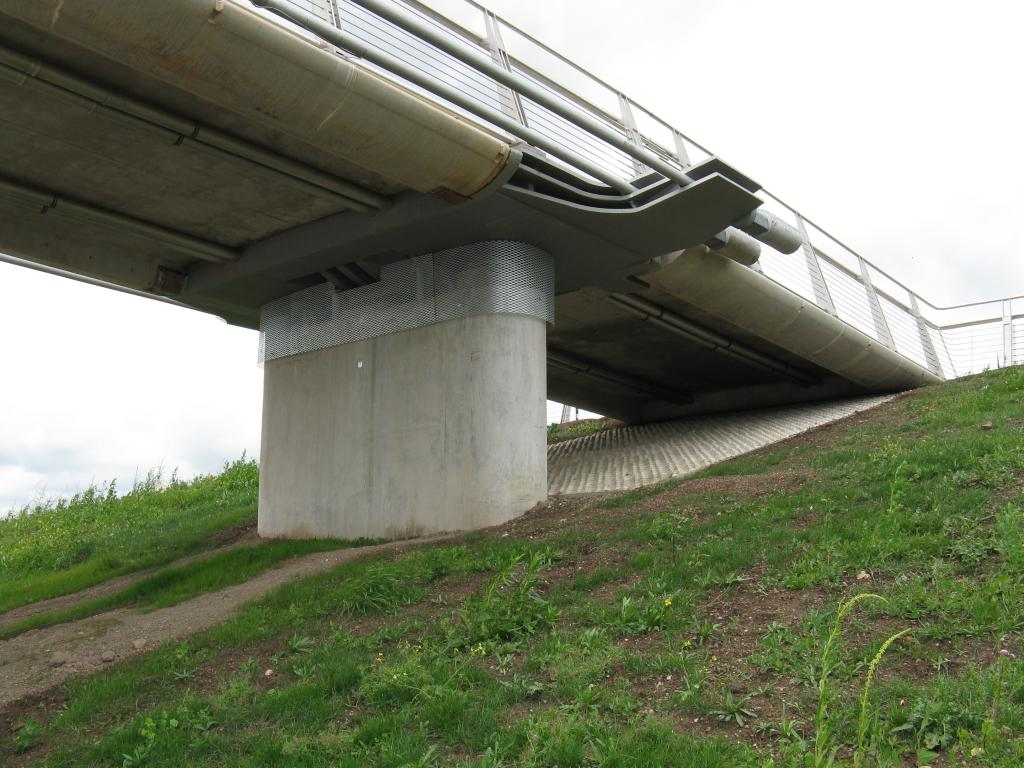
The north riverside pier and abutment

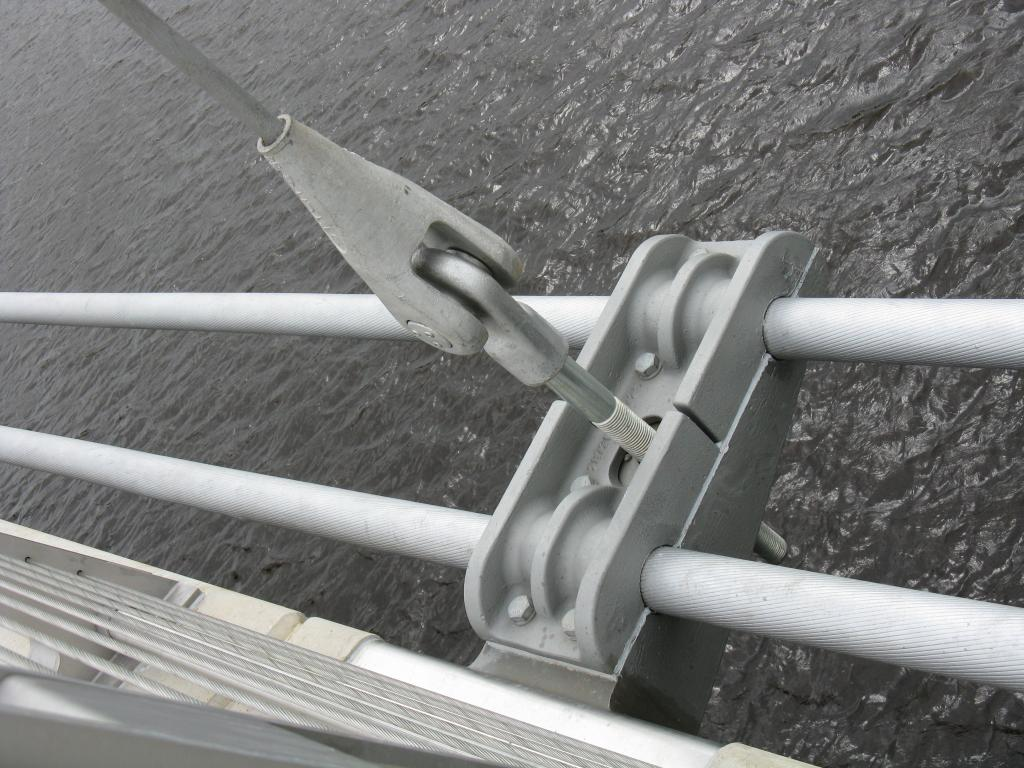
An angled dropper, deck support and bowstring cables

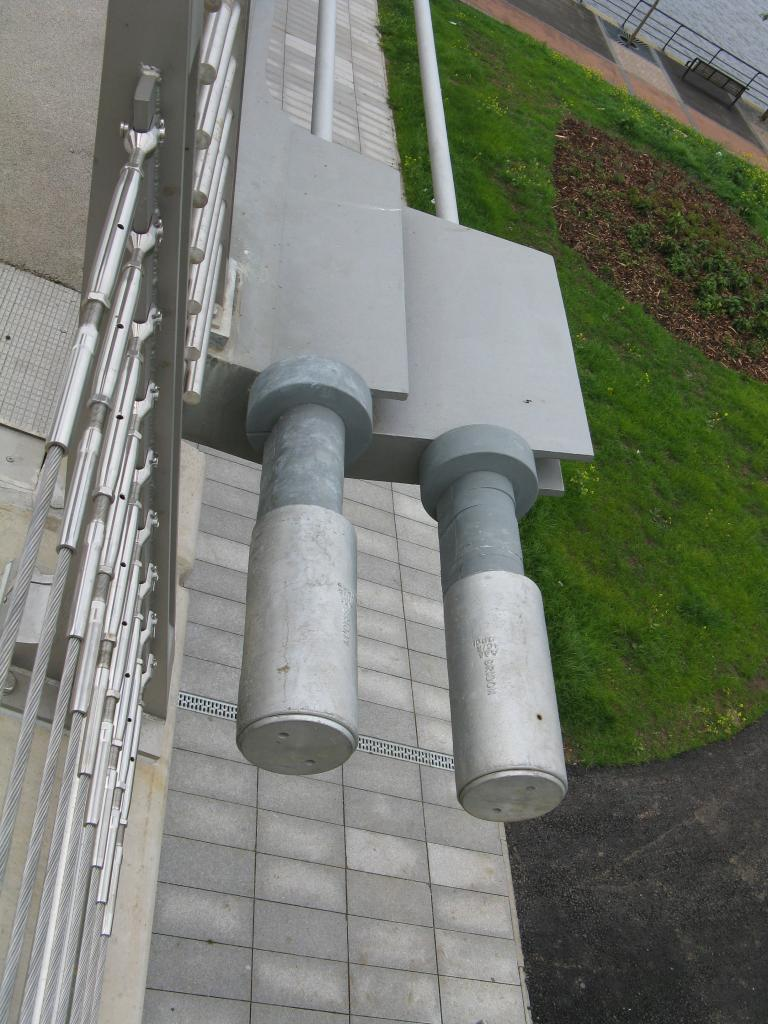
Tie cable tensioning clamps on the north bank

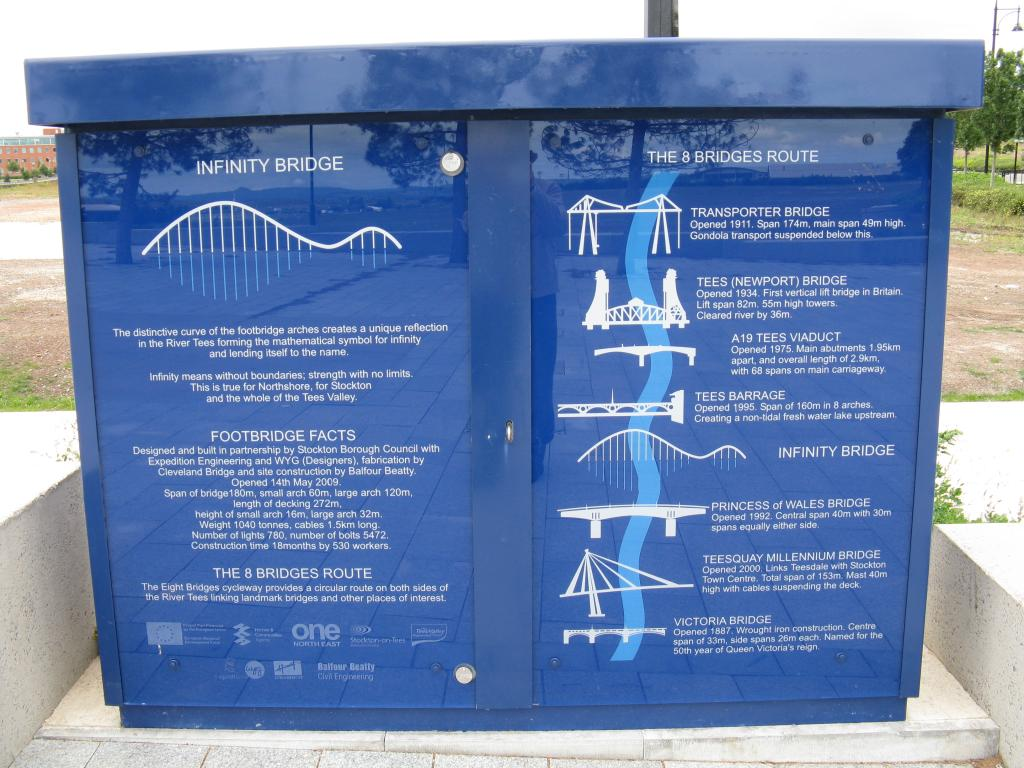
Infinity Bridge information board

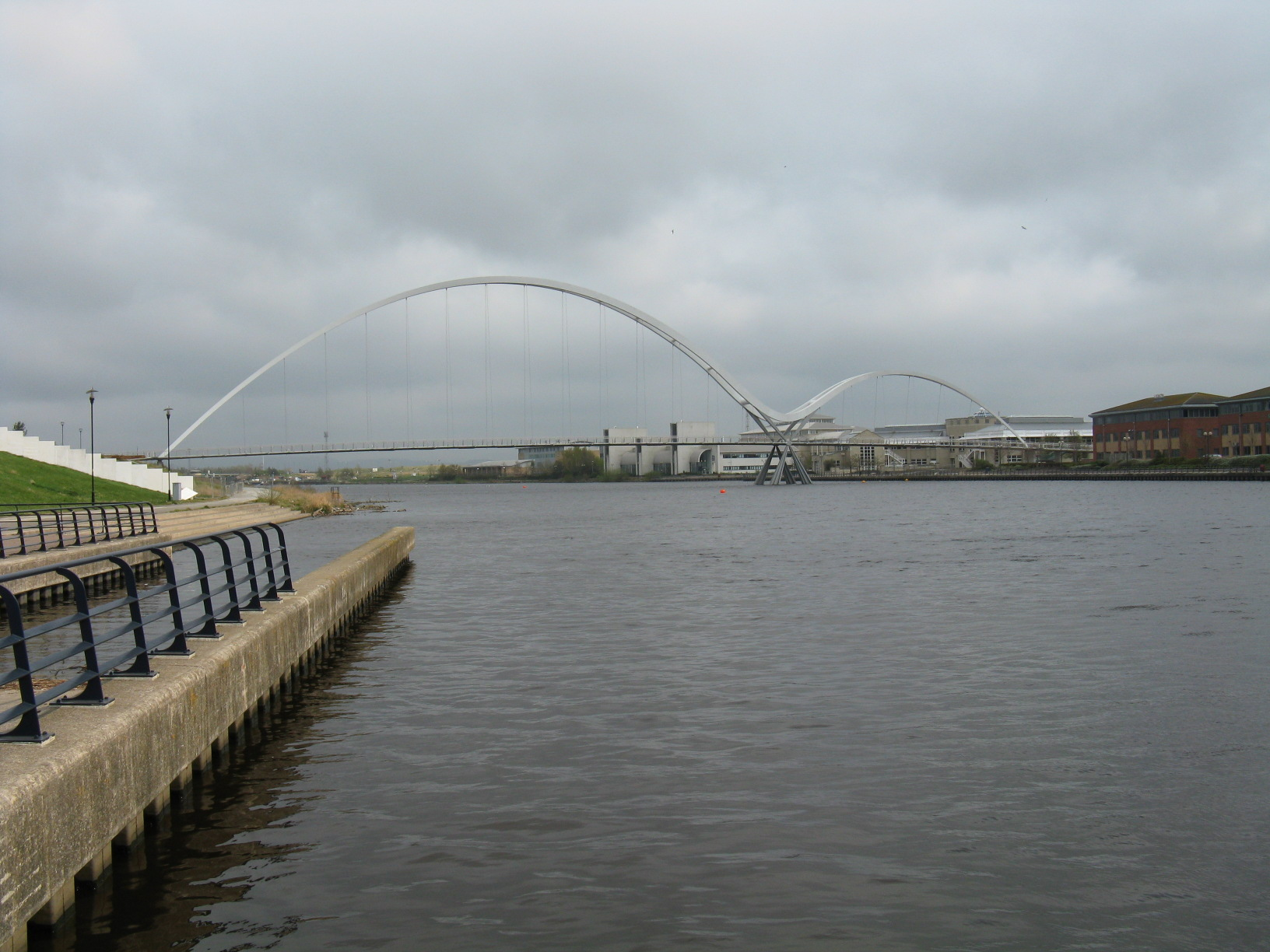
Infinity Bridge from the River Tees Watersports Centre
