= Princess of Wales Bridge =

Road bridge over the River Tees in England

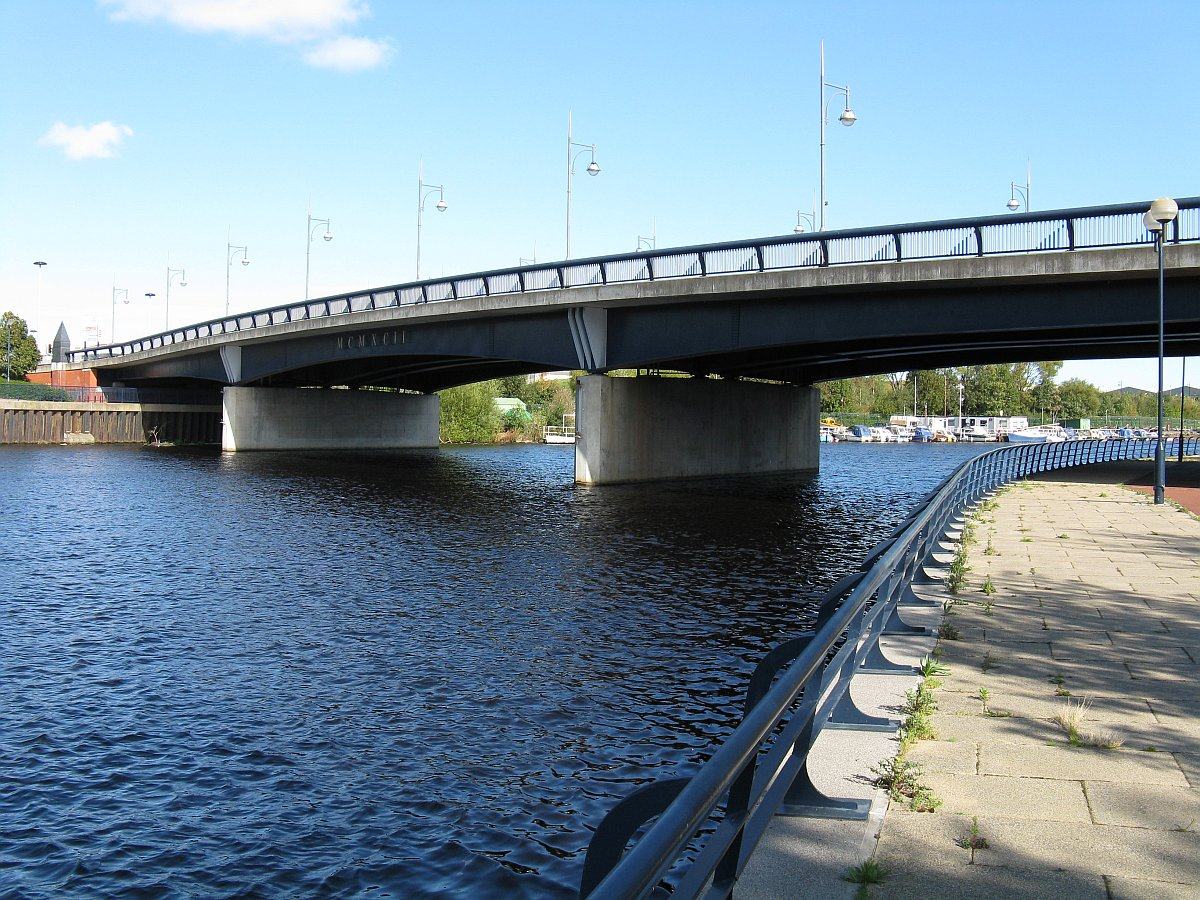
- Princess of Wales Bridge
- Coordinates: 54°33′57″N 1°18′26″W
- Carries: Council of Europe Boulevard
- Crosses: River Tees, Teesdale Way
- Locale: Stockton-on-Tees, England
- Official name: Princess of Wales Bridge
- Preceded by: Teesquay Millennium Bridge
- Followed by: Infinity Bridge

Characteristics
- Design: Slab and girder
- Material: Steel plate girders and concrete
- Longest span: 40 metres (131 ft)
- No. of spans: 3
- Piers in water: 2

History
- Constructed by: Tarmac Group
- Construction end: 1992
- Inaugurated: 23 September 1992

Location
- Interactive map of Princess of Wales Bridge

The Princess of Wales Bridge, sometimes referred to as the Diana Bridge or the Princess Diana Bridge, is a dual carriageway road bridge named after the late Diana, Princess of Wales. It carries Council of Europe Boulevard across the River Tees, Northern England.

Teesdale Business Park in Thornaby is to the south, and to the north is the northeast of Stockton town centre (at the north end of Riverside Road at a gyratory system). It is in the borough of Stockton-on-Tees.

== Design ==
The bridge is of a slab and girder design with concrete piers and steel plate girder decking. The bridge has three spans – the centre span is 40 metres with two side spans of 30 metres each. The bridge has four steel plate girders with composite concrete decking and the abutments and piers are supported on steel H piles driven to sandstone bedrock.

== Construction ==
The bridge was commissioned by the Teesside Development Corporation and built at a cost of £3 million by Tarmac Group.

== Operation ==
The bridge was inaugurated on 23 September 1992 by Diana, Princess of Wales. On rare occasions the bridge is closed for fireworks events.

After the death of Diana, Princess of Wales the bridge was fitted with two memorial plaques.

== Local facilities ==
Just downriver of the bridge is the River Tees Watersports Centre hosting watersports such as rowing, canoeing, waterskiing, jet skiing and dragon boat racing.

== Image gallery ==
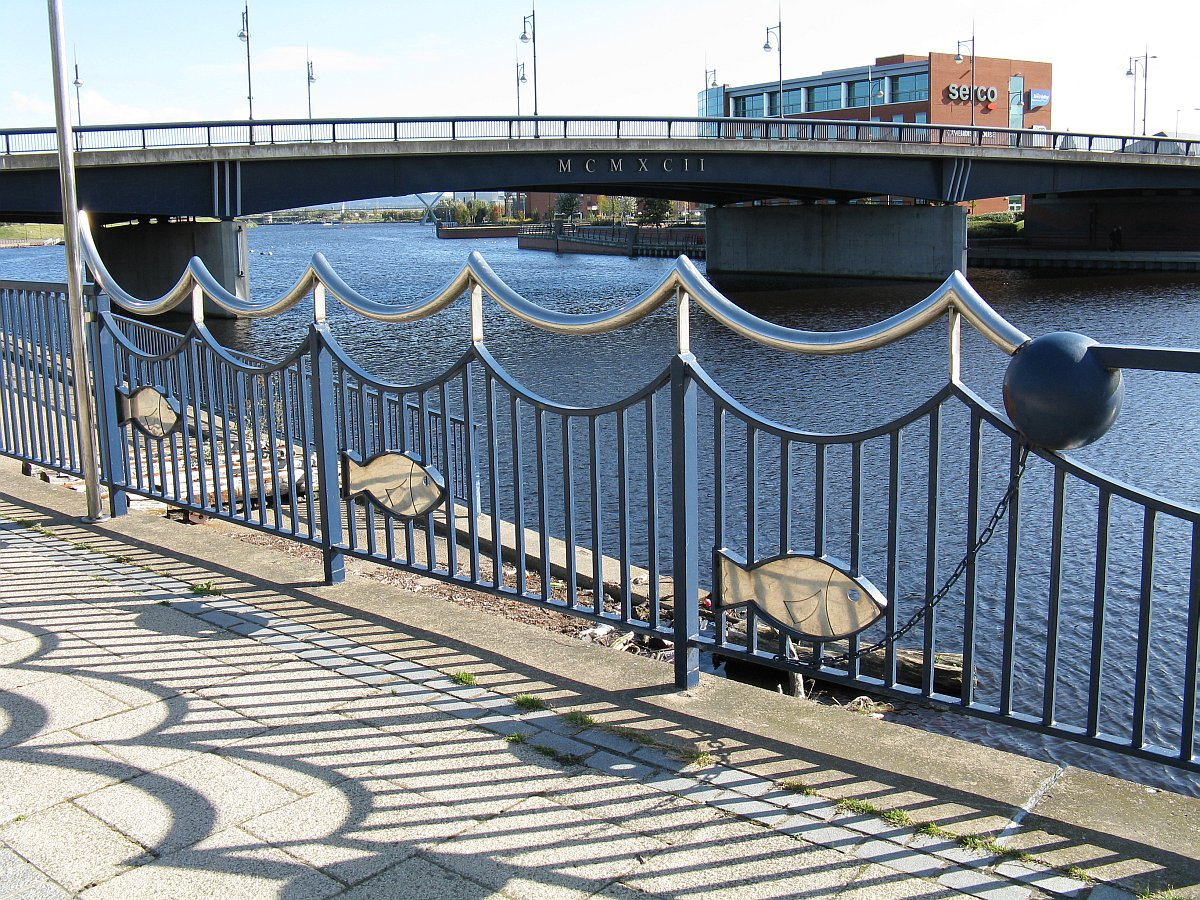
Princess of Wales bridge from the fish quay north bank upriver

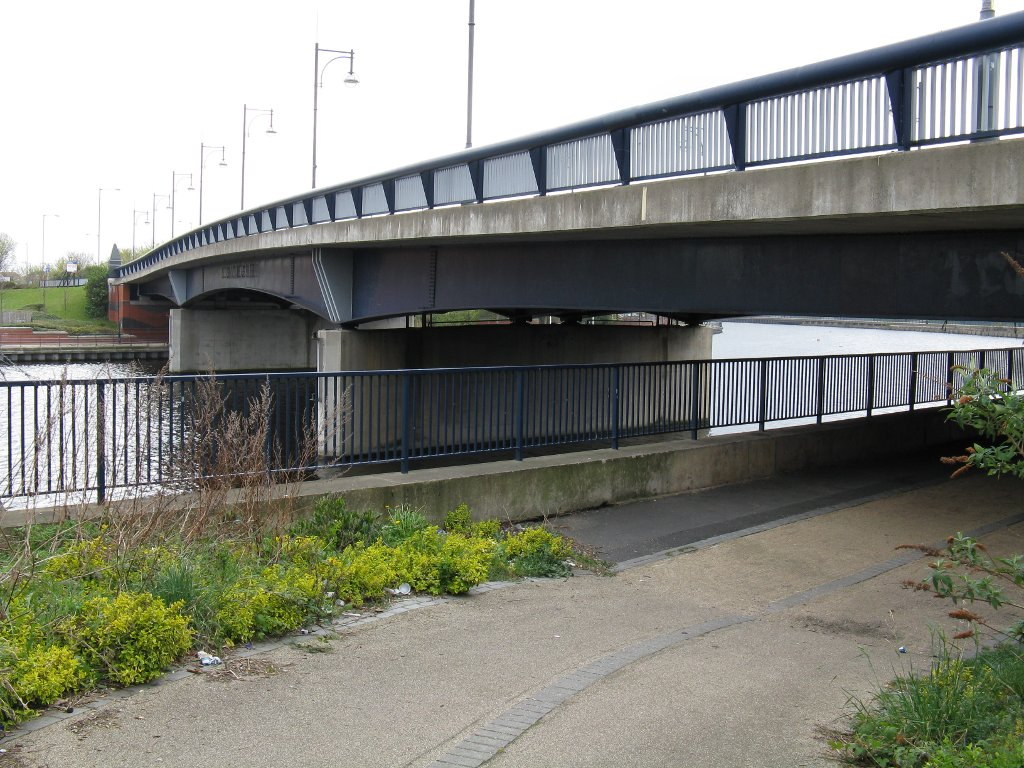
Princess of Wales bridge from the north bank downriver

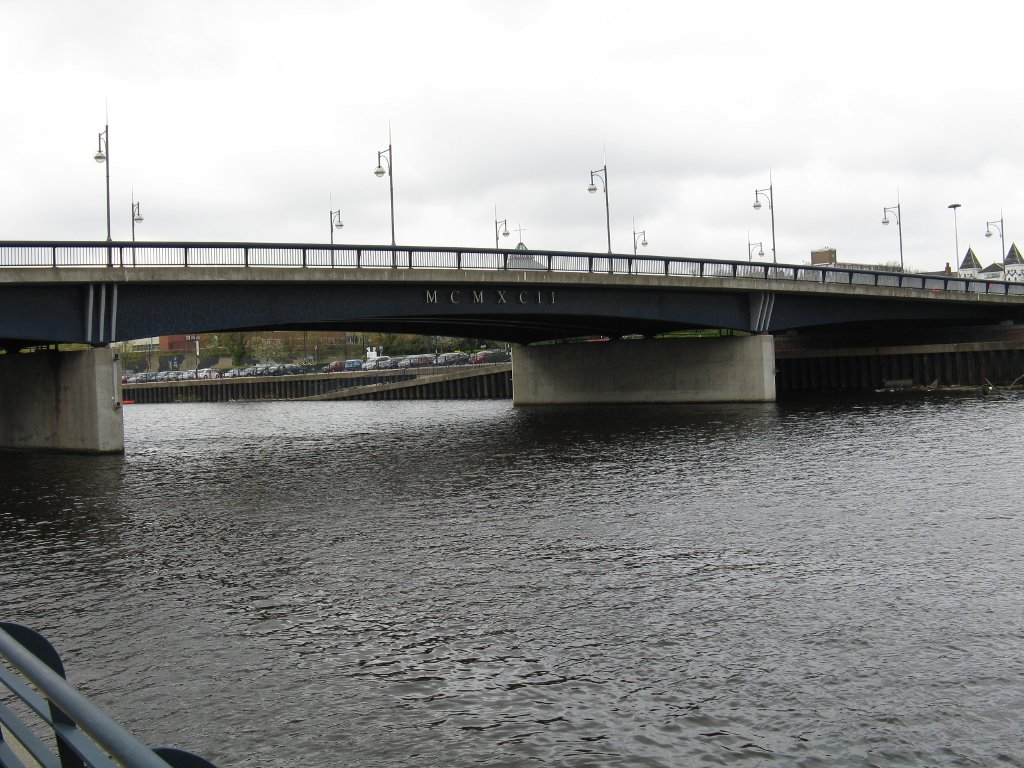
Princess of Wales Bridge from the south bank downriver

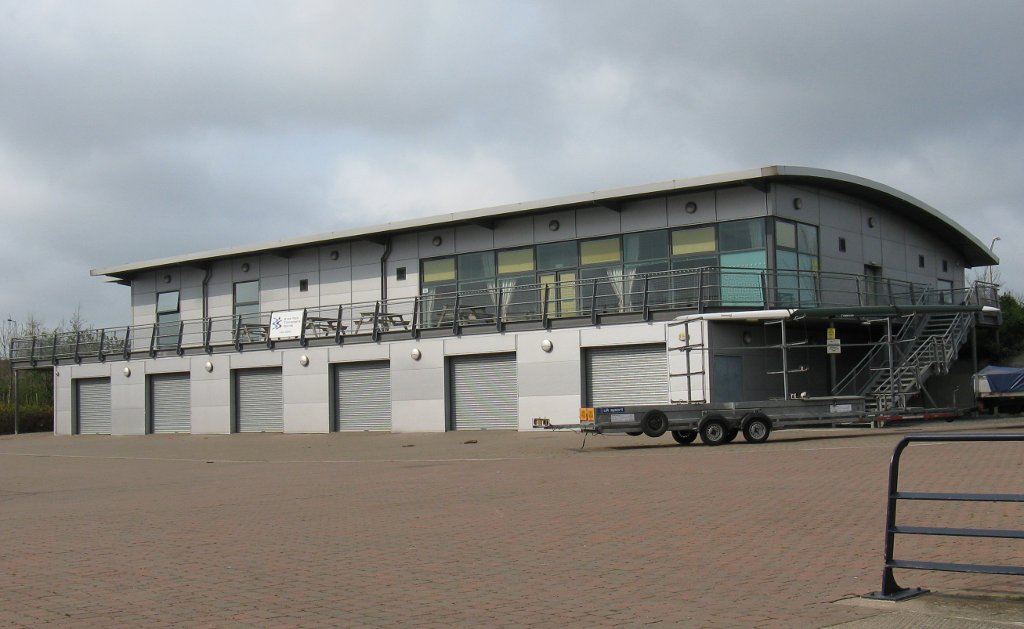
River Tees Watersports Centre
