= North England Inward Investment Agency =

North of England Inward Investment Agency
- Type: UK Government
- Industry: Life Sciences,Advanced Engineering, Energy and Environment, IT and Media, Professional Services
- Founded: 1999
- Founders: Northwest Regional Development Agency, One NorthEast, Yorkshire Forward
- Defunct: 2012
- Headquarters: Atlanta, Georgia, United States
- Key people: Kristen Hirst (Vice President); Simon Goon (Chairman of Board)
- Number of employees: 13
- Website: www.thenoe.com

The North of England Inward Investment Agency (NoE, 'North of England') was a UK government sponsored agency that represented the three regional development agencies (RDAs) of Northern England: Northwest Regional Development Agency (NWDA), One NorthEast (ONE) and Yorkshire Forward (YF). NoE’s primary function was to work as an ambassador to businesses and therefore attract targeted inward investment to Northern England.

NoE provided a link between businesses considering European expansion or relocation and resources in Northern England. Once a company made the decision to expand or relocate into Northern England, NoE’s function changes to be a bridge for that transition, working to connect new inward investment companies with the people, resources, funding and more to help minimise risk and increase profitability. Some of the planning services that NoE provided to potential inward investment companies included: industry trends analysis, recruitment and training assistance, matching skills provision to employer needs, site location assistance, legal/customs/taxation information, introductions to private funding, links to academia, as well as UK and region specific economic and market information.

It had several offices located throughout the U.S. and Canada, and NoE targeted specific industries that would benefit from the infrastructure in place in the UK. These specific industries include: Life Sciences , Energy and Environment , IT and Media , Advanced Engineering , and Professional Services .

NoE was established under the Regional Development Agencies Act 1998, all of which were formally launched in eight English regions on 1 April 1999. It is funded from six Government departments:

- Department for Business, Enterprise and Regulatory Reform;
- Department for Communities and Local Government;
- Department for Culture, Media and Sport;
- Department for Environment, Food and Rural Affairs;
- Department for Innovation, Universities and Skills;
- UK Trade & Investment

Each RDA was led by a Chair and a Board of 15 people. The RDA Chairs met regularly with each other and with Government ministers to advise on national policy. They provided a regional perspective informed by work on the ground with partners and by the extensive consultations they hold in the regions. RDAs helped central government ensure that local conditions and local needs are fully taken into account when they drew up national policy.

It was effectively abolished when its representative agencies, the three regional development agencies, were abolished in 2012.

== The Region ==
The Northern England region encompasses the cities of Leeds, Liverpool, Manchester, Newcastle, Sheffield and Sunderland. The North is considered by many to be one of the most culturally dynamic regions in the UK, with an identity separate from that of the rest of England. The underlying structural changes occurring in the North England economy has been impressive. Manchester, Leeds, Newcastle, Sheffield and Liverpool have all outpaced UK national economic growth. The Northwest has a projected £111 billion economy (the 12th largest in Europe),while the Northeast's economy has an annual turnover of £4bn. Healthcare, life sciences, advanced engineering, business and financial services, multimedia and energy are all significant contributors to North England's economic infrastructure. Some of the Region's Top Industries include: Life Sciences , Energy and Environment , IT and Media , Advanced Engineering , and Professional Services .

== Board Members in the Region ==
Simon Goon - Chairman

Patrick Kendall- ONE Northeast

Sarah Kemp- NWDA

John Cunliffe- NWDA

Kristen Hirst- NOE

== Inward Investment and North England ==
Inward investment is the injection of money from an external source into a region, in order to purchase capital goods for a branch of a corporation to locate or develop its presence in the region. Foreign firms are a catalyst for better economic performance. For one thing, they invest more, employ more skilled people and are more productive. Careful consideration should be given to the costs and benefits of attracting inward investors. When locating a business, inward investors seek:

- A stable macro-economic climate
- stable political and regulatory environment
- Market access and open competition
- A welcoming environment
- Available sites and/or premises
- Appropriate, available and reliable utilities and transportation
- Available skilled workforce
- Available local suppliers and resources
- Appropriate education, training and research facilities
- A good quality of life
- Manageable regulation and taxation systems
- Incentive schemes

Foreign firms had seen the UK as an attractive place for business expansion or business relocation; it was the number one gateway to Europe giving easy access to the then other 27 member states of the European Union, the world's largest single market, with its then population of nearly 500 million. The UK government reported that the United States was the primary source for inward investment in the United Kingdom, accounting for 50 percent of all projects, followed by Germany, Canada, Japan, and France. According to UK Trade and Investment, (UKTI), more than 1,200 overseas companies had chosen to invest in the UK in 2007, making it the best year ever for inward investment. More than 45,000 new jobs were created in 2008 by companies launching in the UK or expanding existing operations while 58,000 jobs were safeguarded, with US firms accounting for 30% of all new investments during the year.

== Offices in North America ==
NoE had several offices in the United States, including Atlanta, Boston, Chicago, Newport Beach, and Toronto. Kristen Hirst, Senior Vice President, oversaw the agency's operations throughout North America.

Atlanta (South East Region)

3455 Peachtree Road, 5th Floor Atlanta, GA 30326

Boston (New England Region)

8 Franeuil Hall Market Place, 3rd Floor Boston, MA 02109 (Prior to 2001 The NOE was based in the offices of Yorkshire Forward at 28 Junction Square Dr, Concord, MA 01742, USA)

Chicago (North East & Midwest Region)

444 North Michigan Avenue, Suite 3350 Chicago, IL 60611

Newport Beach (West Coast Region)

4695 MacArthur Court, 11th Floor Newport Beach, CA 92660

Toronto (Canada)

234 Berkeley Street Toronto, ON M5A 2X4
