= Teessaurus Park =

Sculpture park in North Yorkshire, England

- Interactive map of Teessaurus Park
- Type: Sculpture Park
- Location: Middlesbrough
- Coordinates: 54.589°N 1.248°W
- Area: 10 acres (4.0 ha)
- Created: 1979
- Operator: Middlesbrough Council
- Status: Open

Teessaurus Park is a 10 acre urban grassland recreational area and sculpture park opened in 1979 in the Riverside Park light industrial estate, Middlesbrough, on the southern bank of the River Tees. It was built on a former slag heap in what was the Ironmasters district and represents, without any irony, the iron and steel industry that used to exist on the site and in the area. The park has its own small car park and has become something of a nature reserve. The route of the Teesdale Way passes through the park.

== Sculptures ==
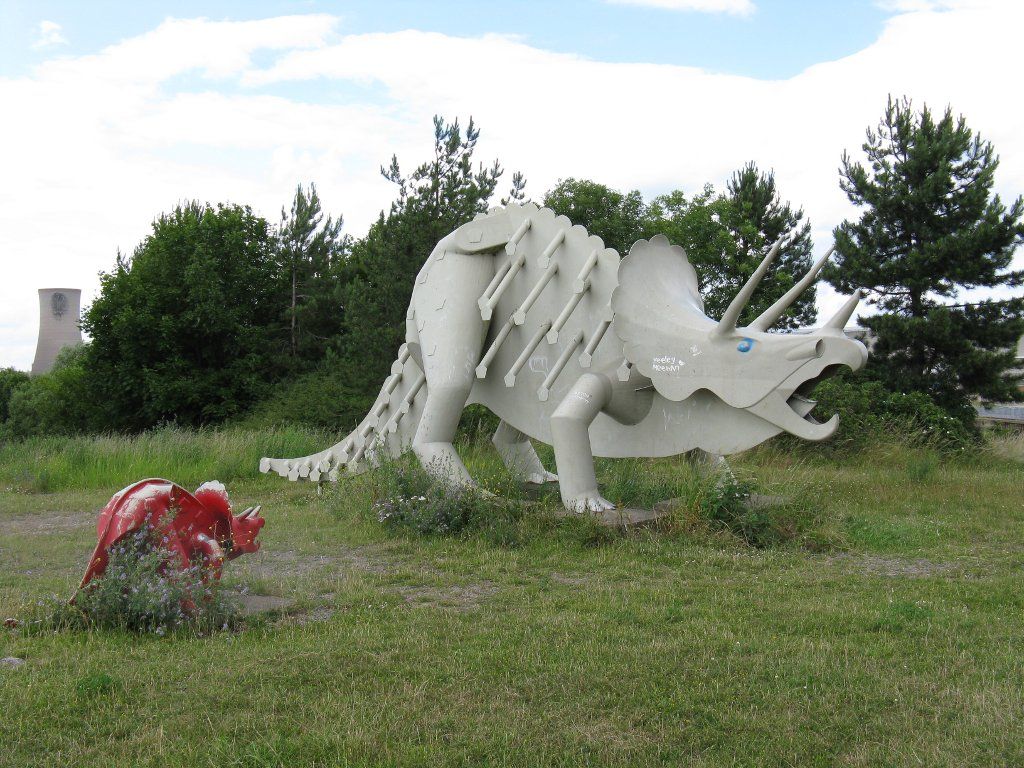
'Teessaurus' – a painted steel sculpture of a triceratops and one of two infants.

The park was started as a result of entering an Art to Landscape competition organised by The Sunday Times and the Arts Council. Middlesbrough Council had commissioned a life size painted steel sculpture of a triceratops called Teessaurus from Genevieve Glatt that was fabricated by Harts of Stockton at a total cost of £16,000 and installed on a mound at the northern end of the park. The park was opened with this sculpture in 1979 and two infant triceratops were added later. From 1987 onwards, a life-size brachiosaurus, brontosaurus, mammoth, stegosaurus and tyrannosaurus sculptures were added at the sides of the park. These sculptures were built by workers on the government Youth and Employment Training Scheme at Amarc Training and Safety.
