= Millennium Bridge =

Several bridges are known as the Millennium Bridge:

- in the United Kingdom
  - Gateshead Millennium Bridge
  - Lune Millennium Bridge, Lancaster
  - Millennium Bridge, Glasgow
  - Millennium Bridge, London
  - Millennium Bridge (Salford Quays)
  - Teesquay Millennium Footbridge, Stockton-on-Tees
  - Millennium Bridge, York
- in the Republic of Ireland
  - Millennium Bridge (Dublin), a footbridge across the River Liffey in Dublin
- in Montenegro
  - Millennium Bridge (Podgorica)
- in Poland
  - Third Millennium John Paul II Bridge, Gdansk
- in Russia
  - Millennium Bridge (Kazan)
- in Spain
  - Puente del Milenio (Orense)
- in the United States
  - Denver Millennium Bridge, Denver, Colorado
  - BP Pedestrian Bridge, Chicago, Illinois
