= Tees Victoria Bridge =

Road bridge over the River Tees in Northern England

Victoria Jubilee Bridge
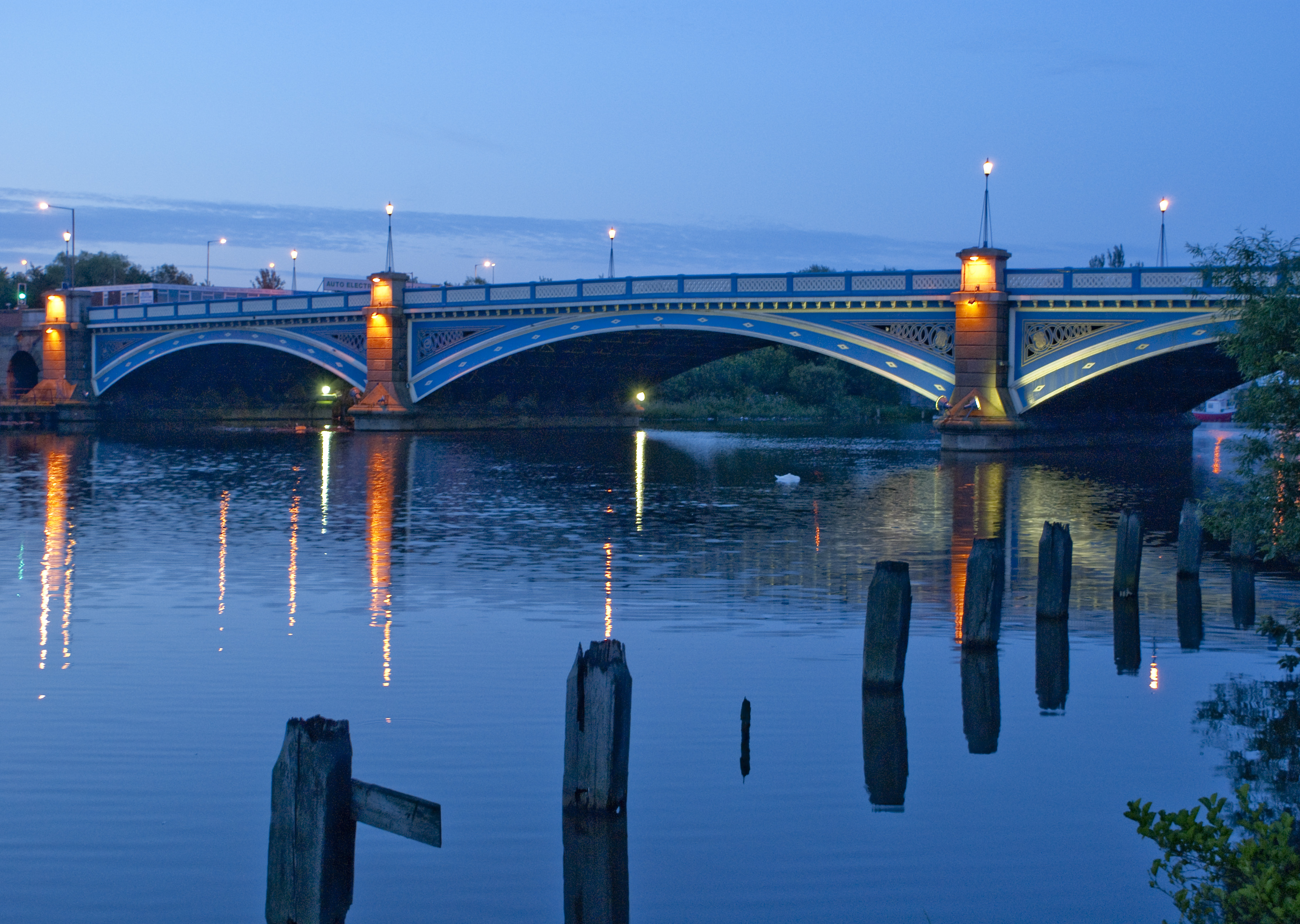
- Victoria Bridge over the river Tees
- Coordinates: 54°33′30″N 1°18′25″W
- Carries: Bridge Road (A1130)
- Crosses: River Tees
- Locale: Borough of Stockton-on-Tees, England, United Kingdom
- Official name: Victoria Jubilee Bridge
- Heritage status: Grade II listed building (19 February 2010)
- Preceded by: Surtees Rail Bridge
- Followed by: Teesquay Millennium Bridge

Characteristics
- Design: Wrought iron arch
- Material: Wrought and cast iron, stone and concrete
- Total length: 341 feet (104 m)
- Width: 60 feet (18 m)
- Longest span: 110 feet (34 m)
- No. of spans: 3
- Piers in water: 2

History
- Designer: Harrison Haytor and Charles Neate
- Constructed by: Whitaker Brothers of Leeds
- Construction start: 1882
- Construction end: 1887
- Opened: 20 June 1887

The Victoria Jubilee Bridge, also known as Victoria Bridge, is a road bridge carrying Bridge Road (A1130) east west across the River Tees between Stockton and Thornaby in Northern England. The bridge is located just south east of Stockton town centre in the town's namesake borough.

Under Stockton Bridge Act 1881 (44 & 45 Vict. c. cxlvii), the bridge was constructed (1882–1887) at a cost of £69,051 by Whitaker Brothers of Leeds, financed by the local council, a tramway company, the North Eastern Railway and the water board. The name commemorates the 50th year of the reign of Queen Victoria.

== Earlier crossings ==
Before the existence of a bridge at this location communication was provided by Bishop's Ferry. The first bridge was the five arch Stockton Bridge designed by Joseph Robson of Sunderland and completed in 1771. This replaced Yarm Bridge as the lowest bridge point on the River Tees. The bridge piers had to be reinforced with stone piles in the early 1800s owing to subsidence. The bridge was toll free by 1820. By 1860, the width of the bridge had become insufficient to sustain the increased level of traffic and although alterations were made, they did not altogether solve the problem and so plans for a replacement bridge were drawn up in 1876.

== Design ==
The design is a wrought-iron arch bridge by Charles Neate and consulting engineer Harrison Haytor. The foundations of the abutments and piers are five cylindrical columns, 40 feet (12 m) deep and 14 feet (4.3 m) in diameter. The abutments are faced with granite and sandstone and are filled in with large stone rubble. The bridge has three arches – the centre arch is 110 feet (34 m) wide and the side arches are 85 feet (26 m). The arches each have eight wrought iron ribs that vary in thickness from 3 feet (91 cm) at the centre to 4 feet (120 cm) at the bearings. The deck is carried on buckled plates resting on secondary beams. The road is 40 feet (12 m) wide and the pavement 10 feet (3 m) wide. The balustrades are cast iron with an open design of interlocking circles, and on the parapets are ornamental cast-iron lampposts carrying modern lights while the spandrels are open cast-iron work with a design of diminishing interlocking circles.

At either side of the bridge are land-based arches that are currently impassable on the upriver side. These were designed to allow horse-drawn barges to pass under the bridge.

== Construction ==
Whitaker Brothers of Leeds began construction in 1882, and completed the bridge in 1887.

== Operation ==
The bridge was opened on 20 June 1887. Shortly after the opening the tram system was extended over the bridge, and the bridge was to be used by trams until 1931. The bridge at this point was the lowest bridge point until the opening of the Transporter Bridge in 1911 and the lowest permanent bridge point until the opening of the Newport Bridge in 1934. During the Second World War a bomb passed through the roadway without exploding and the bridge still bears shrapnel damage from the time. The bridge used to carry the A66 and A67 until the Surtees Bridge was built in 1981. In 2010 the bridge was made a grade II listed building.

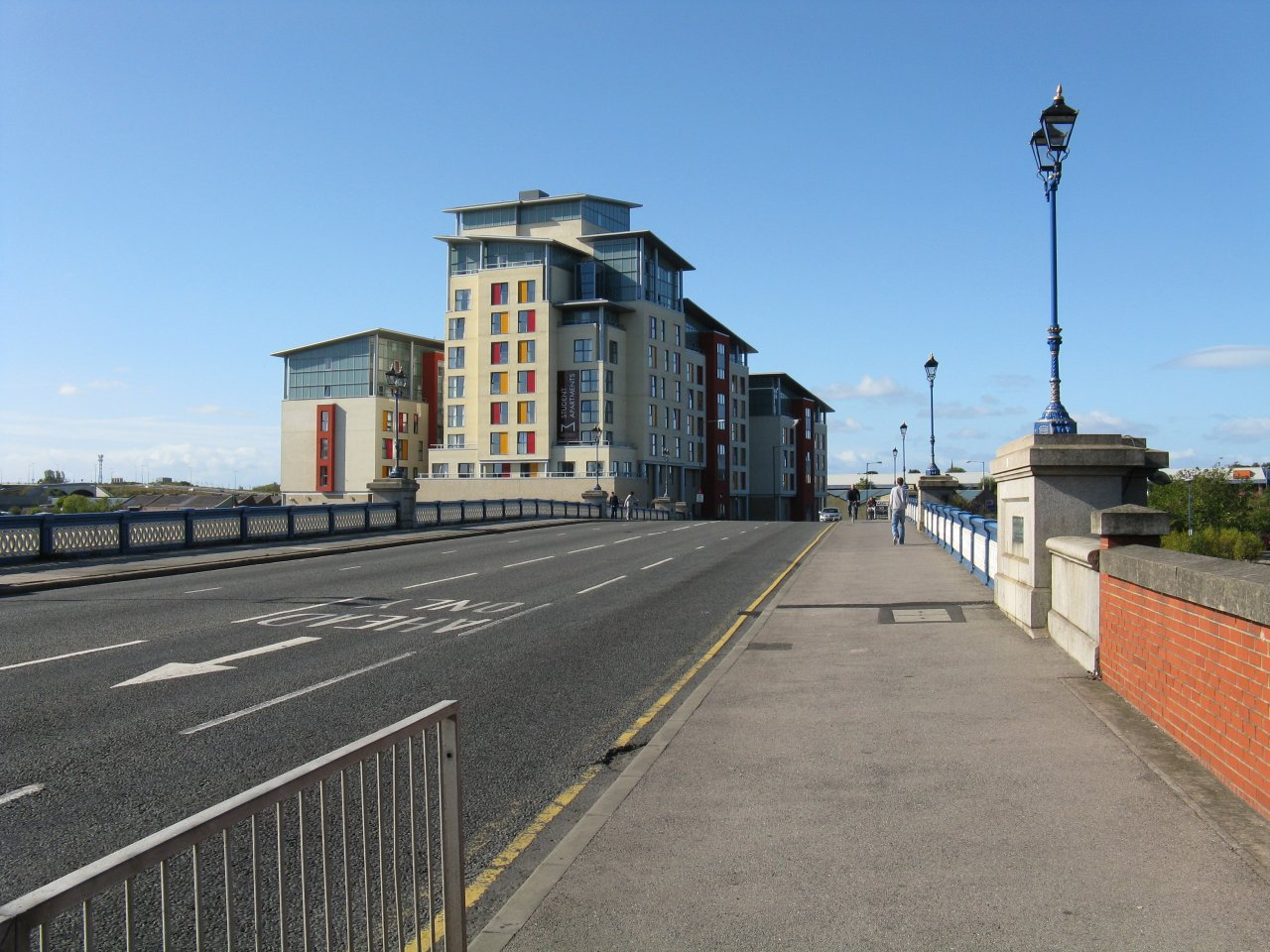
The view over the bridge roadway

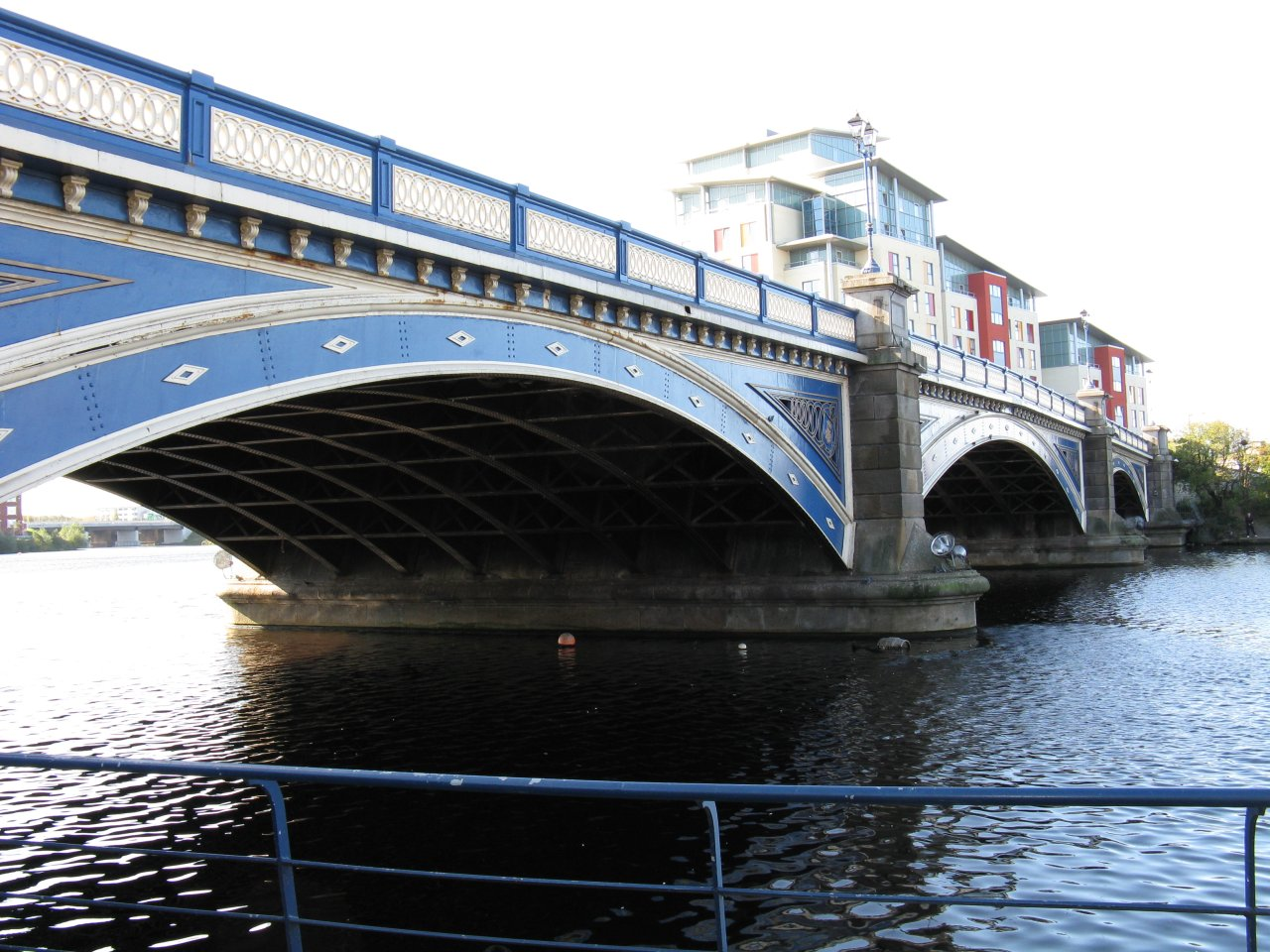
The view from the east bank

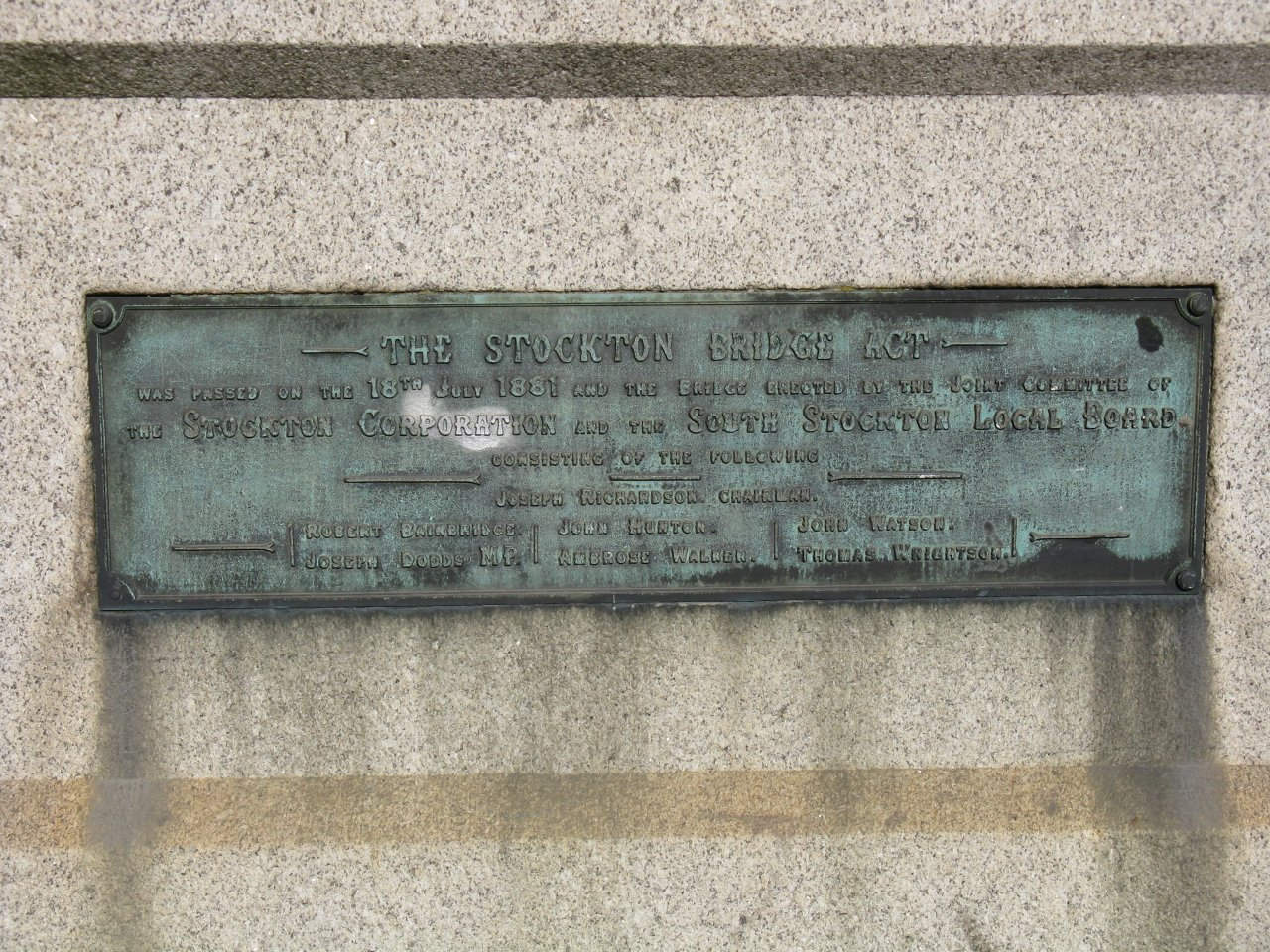
A commemorative plaque on the bridge.
