= Inward investment =

Type of investment

Inward investment is the injection of money from an external source into a region. It may be in order to purchase capital goods for a branch of a corporation to locate or develop its presence in the region. Alternatively, it may also be used as an economic development strategy or for political purposes.

Foreign sources, such as transnational corporations or multinational corporations invest money by introducing new industrial sites to an area, in order to produce more of their product, sometimes in response to changes noticed in that area, such as a growing population or enhanced transport network. Inward investment creates jobs in an area and brings wealth into the economy.

Some places do however attract inward investment due to their relative remoteness, for example a company wanting to recruit personnel with relatively common skills might deliberately relocate to an area where wage rates are relatively low, a factor that could arise because of the absence of similar jobs or localised underemployment. Some international investors might seek to take advantage of relatively lax regulation through investing abroad.

Some economic development agencies, governments or local authorities are occasionally accused of concentrating on attracting inward investment to such an extent that they neglect to nurture home-grown small businesses or entrepreneurs with exciting ideas. As with much marketing effort, a balance is often required to maximise economic progress that is socially and environmentally appropriate.

Another aspect of inward investment is financial inward investment activity, which rather than focusing on attracting "offshoot" operations of overseas companies, focuses on encouraging global focused overseas venture capitalist and hedge-fund investment into companies in a country or region.

== Examples ==
Examples of inward investment include investments made by Japanese corporations in the UK car industry, including those investments as a result of government policy through agencies such as the Scottish Development Agency and Welsh Development Agency.

In 2000, the United States was seen as one of the most important sources of inward investment in the UK.

== Investment promotion and facilitation ==
Governments and regional authorities often seek inward investment through investment promotion and facilitation policies. These policies may include providing information to potential investors, reducing administrative barriers, coordinating permits and approvals, and offering aftercare services to firms that have already invested in a location. Investment promotion agencies are commonly used to market locations to investors and to support the establishment or expansion of business operations.

The effectiveness of inward investment promotion is usually assessed through indicators such as the number of investment projects, jobs created or safeguarded, capital expenditure, and the source countries of investors. In the United Kingdom, for example, official inward investment statistics report foreign direct investment projects alongside associated employment and capital expenditure figures.

== See also ==
- Foreign direct investment
