= One NorthEast =

One North East
- Formation: April 1999
- Legal status: Government agency
- Purpose: Government funding for North East England
- Region served: North East England
- Chief Executive: Alan Clarke
- Main organ: One North East Board (Chairman - Paul Callaghan)
- Parent organization: BIS
- Affiliations: Association of North East Councils, UKTI
- Website: One North East

One North East was the regional development agency for the North East England region.

== History ==
It was established in April 1999. The North East received government aid for regeneration.

In June 2010, it was announced that One North East was to be abolished and this occurred on 31 March 2012.

== Structure ==
It was based on the western side of the A1 Newcastle bypass, north of the Tyne, on the former site of the Stella power stations.

== See also ==
- North England Inward Investment Agency
