= Thornaby-on-Tees =

Town and civil parish in North Yorkshire, England

Coordinates: 54.5585°N 1.3025°W

Thornaby-on-Tees: Thornaby
- Town and civil parish
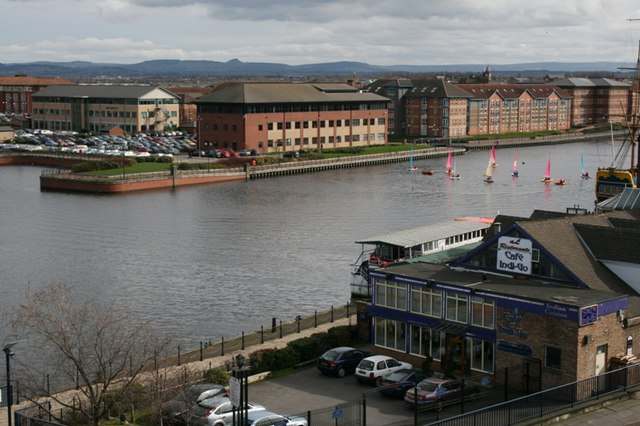
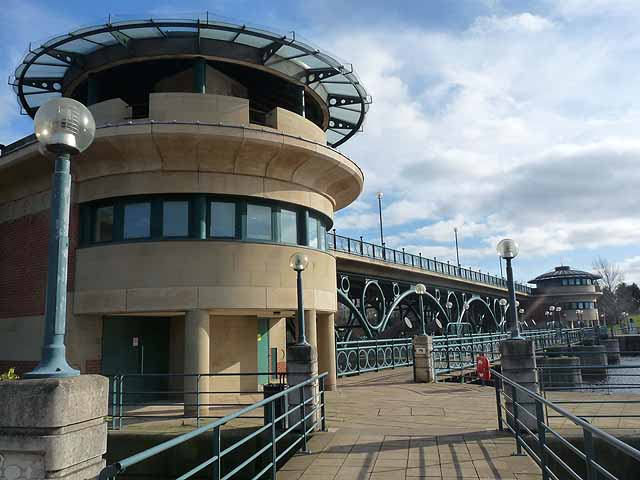
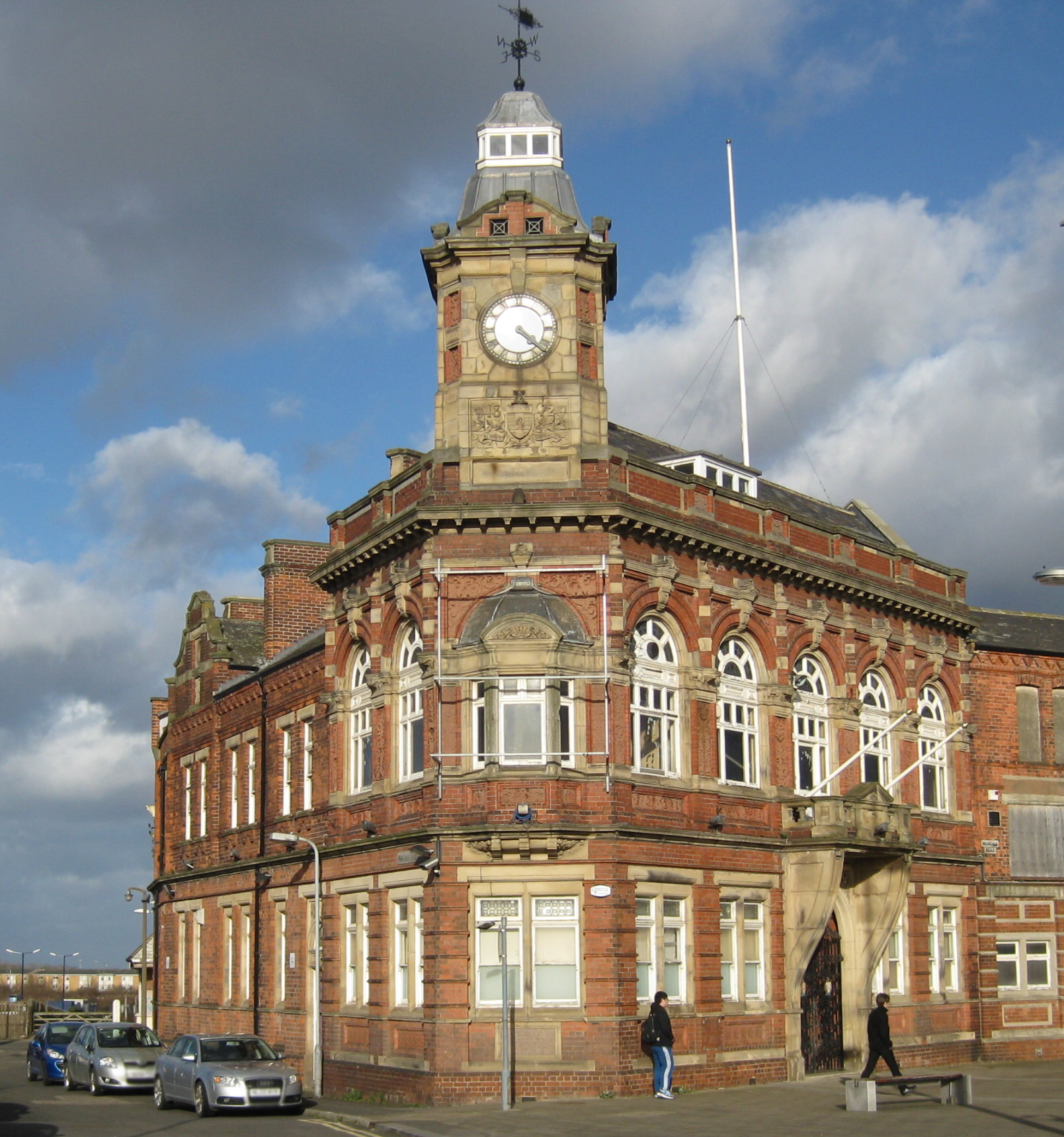
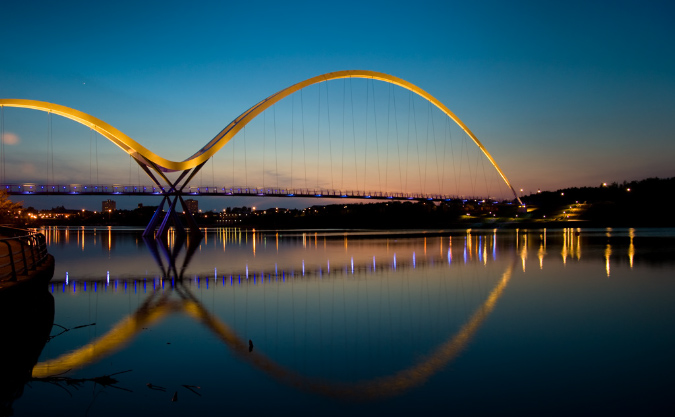
- From the top, Thornaby from across the River Tees, Tees Barrage, Town Hall, Infinity Bridge

- Location within North Yorkshire
- Population: 24,741 (2011 census)
- OS grid reference: NZ450180
- Civil parish: Thornaby
- Unitary authority: Stockton-on-Tees
- Ceremonial county: North Yorkshire
- Region: North East
- Country: England
- Sovereign state: United Kingdom
- Post town: STOCKTON-ON-TEES
- Postcode district: TS17
- Dialling code: 01642
- Police: Cleveland
- Fire: Cleveland
- Ambulance: North East
- UK Parliament: Stockton West Middlesbrough and Thornaby East
- Website: Town council website

Thornaby-on-Tees, commonly referred to as Thornaby, is a town and civil parish in North Yorkshire, England, 41 miles (66 km) north of York and 3.5 miles (5.6 km) south-east of Middlesbrough. On the south bank of the River Tees, Thornaby falls within the Borough of Stockton-on-Tees and the Tees Valley area. The parish had a population of 24,741 at the 2011 census.

The town was incorporated as a municipal borough in 1892, during the Victorian era. The borough was abolished in 1968 on the creation of the County Borough of Teesside. A civil parish called Thornaby was re-created in 1996.

The modern centre was built on the north eastern part of Thornaby airfield and lies 2 miles (3.2 km) south-east of Stockton-on-Tees and 4 miles (6.4 km) south-west of Middlesbrough.

== History ==
=== Prehistoric ===
There are other signs of Thornaby being a much older settlement. Traces of prehistoric man have been found, the earliest being a stone axe, 8 inches long, dating back to the Mesolithic Period (about 3000 BC). In 1926, a dugout canoe said to date from about 1600 – 1400 BC was found in the mud under 8 feet (2.4 metres) of water opposite Thornaby High Wood. An arrowhead of the Neolithic Period (about 3000 BC) was found in a garden on Thornaby Village Green.

=== Danes ===
The name Thornaby came into existence about AD 800 when the land was given by Halfdene (Halfdan Ragnarsson), King of the Danes, to Thormod, one of his noblemen, hence "Thormods-by" – Thormod's farmstead. Although the -by suffix originally meant a farmstead, many of these grew into villages, taking the -by suffix with them in their names as with other villages in the area, such as Danby, Faceby, Ingleby, Maltby and Ormesby.

During the Battle of Hastings (1066), one of William the Conqueror's noblemen, Robert I de Brus, marched north with a garrison of men and occupied the area of Cleveland. William gave him those lands to control including Thornaby and Middlesbrough.

King Sweyn II of Denmark, on 9 September 1069, defeated the Normans at York by killing the entire garrison of 3,000 men. William swore an oath to take revenge on Sweyn by destroying every house and dwelling in the lands under Sweyn's rule, leaving all the land in the north east of Yorkshire barren and bare.

In the Domesday Book Thornaby is mentioned five times, Thornaby's first mention in the Domesday Book states: "Robert Malet has these lands and they are waste." It appears that they remained undeveloped until the early 19th century as "Thurnaby waaste" is mentioned in a poem by Tennyson called "The Northern Farmer."

Over the centuries there have been a number of different spellings of the name Thornaby including Turmozbi, Tormozbi, Tormozbia and Thurmozbi. The form Thornaby first appears in 1665 and refers to old Thornaby village, south western area of the present town which is near the River Tees as it flows north east.

=== The Five Lamps of St Peter's Church ===
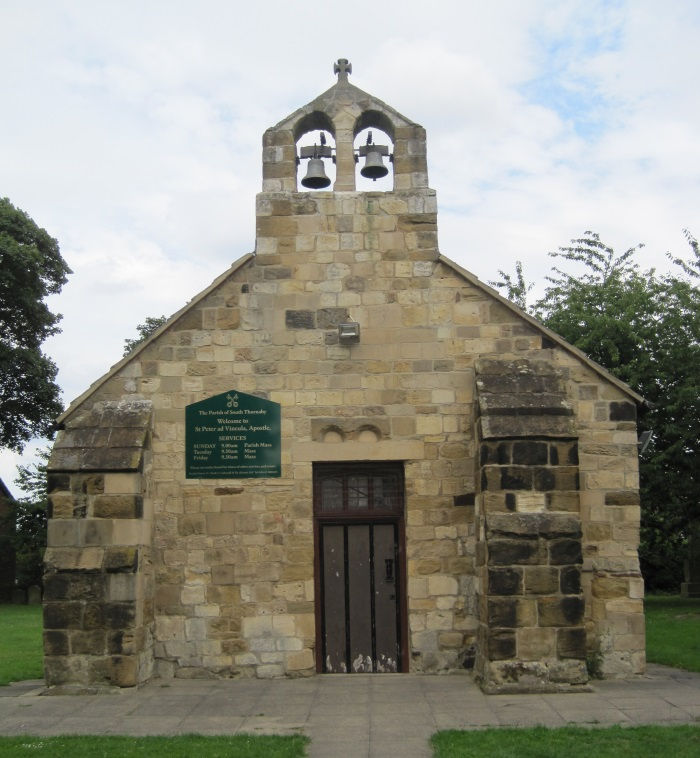
St Peter ad Vincula Church

It is said that Robert de Thormodbi, wounded in the Crusades at Acre, swore to raise a shrine to the Virgin Mary if he survived his wounds. He did, and as part of his wish a shrine niche to the Virgin Mary, lit by five sanctuary lamps, was placed in St Peter's Church. The most frequently recognised 5 Lamps in Thornaby were those erected at the top of George Street in what is now classed as Old Thornaby. These Lamps had the distinction of being a Bus Stop on the '0' service running between Stockton and Middlesbrough.

=== A town from the marshes ===
The former marshes
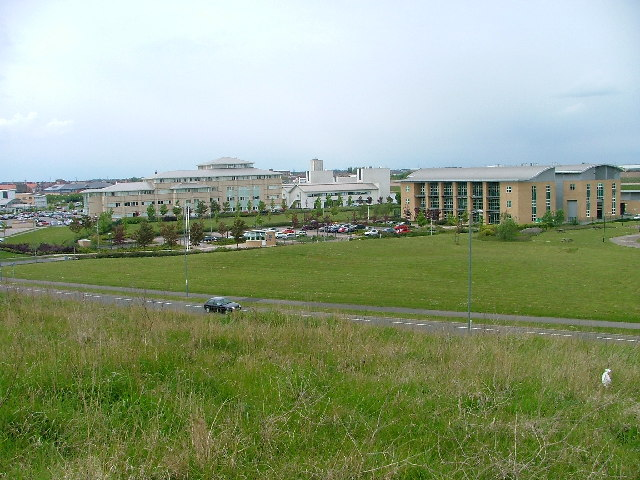
North Thornaby next to Stockton

In 1825, old Thornaby was centred around St Peter's Church and the old village green. Thornaby Carrs (marshes) had been a site of intermittent horse racing before moving to the now former Stockton Racecourse after the River Tees was straightened in 1810, a short distance downstream. From 1825, industry started to be built south of Stockton's existing port industry as the Stockton and Darlington Railway had been established with old Stockton railway station on the other side of the bank. The first site was William Smith's pottery and the area quickly grew with shipbuilding and engineering companies established on the marshes. From 1840 until June 1987 heavy engineering firm Head Wrightson was a major employer in Thornaby.

The area developing on the south bank of the Tees opposite Stockton was initially known as South Stockton. As Stockton's port industry moved to Middlesbrough, shipbuilding was replaced by iron works. A new railway line opened up the area south of the river for further development, with a South Stockton railway station built in 1882.

The new settlement grew as a workforce for new industry, spreading south down and between Thornaby Road, the new Westbury Street, and Mandale Road (once known as Acklam Road). The built-up area of South Stockton grew to merge with the old village of Thornaby; on 6 October 1892 South Stockton and Thornaby formally merged to form a municipal borough which was named Thornaby-on-Tees. South Stockton station was renamed to Thornaby. Thornaby Town Hall was built for the old South Stockton Local Board, and was completed in 1892 a few months before the board was replaced by the new borough council.

=== The airfield, 608 squadron and Spitfires ===
The earliest known flying in Thornaby took place in 1912 when Matthew Young of the Vale Farm was paid 100 Gold Sovereigns for the use of a field for an airshow. Taking place on a Saturday afternoon in June or July, one of the main events was flying by Gustav Hamel, an early flying pioneer. The next known use was by the Royal Flying Corps who used the same fields between 1914 and 1918 as a staging post between Catterick and Marske aerodromes.

In about 1925 negotiations began on the opening of a full-time aerodrome and in the late 1920s the Air Ministry constructed an airfield to the south of the town and the station which was the second permanent aerodrome to be built in Yorkshire (the first being Catterick) was opened on 29 September 1929. During the Second World War, Thornaby came under the control of 18 group, Coastal Command, before this however it had come under Flying Training, Fighter and Bomber Commands, and post-war under Reserve and Fighter Commands, at this time (post-war) it was also used by the Royal Air Force Regiment. During the war a variety of tasks were carried out from RAF Thornaby, such as, attacks on targets in Europe, anti-submarine patrols, operational training, strikes against enemy shipping, leaflet dropping and air sea rescue operations.

608 (North Riding) squadron

Of all the squadrons to have been based at RAF Thornaby during its operational period, "Thornaby's own" 608 (North Riding) squadron is probably the squadron best remembered by the townsfolk. It was formed at Thornaby on 17 March 1930 and went on to serve within both Coastal and Bomber Commands during the Second World War. After the war, on 10 May 1946 the squadron was re-formed at Thornaby and carried on in Reserve Command "at home" until the squadron disbanded for the last time on 10 March 1957. 608 (North Riding) Squadron's Standard, which was approved by the Queen and bears their battle honours, can be seen housed in York Minster under the Astronomical Clock where it was laid-up on 14 November 1959. The numerous items of glass and silverware which were presented to the squadron during their service are held by Middlesbrough Council, are housed in Middlesbrough Town Hall and are to be returned to the squadron should it ever re-form.

=== Post-war expansion ===
The last RAF aircraft (Hawker Hunter F6s) left the airfield on 1 October 1958 and further use of Thornaby as a regional airport ended on 23 February 1962 when all but 60 acres (24 hectares) of land was purchased from the Air Ministry by Thornaby-on-Tees Borough Council.

The administration of Thornaby changed hands first to the County Borough of Teesside (1968–1974) then to the Borough of Stockton-on-Tees (this was initially as a district of Cleveland). The redevelopment of the former airfield began in the 1960s, through the demolition of its buildings and runways, and replacement with new housing, offices, a new town centre and Teesside Industrial Estate.

Many symbols of Thornaby's aeronautical past were placed for posterity with streets (such as Allensway), buildings and public houses using names of Royal Air Force aircraft, stations and personnel. The Bader School (built on the former airfield) on Kintyre Drive was named after and opened by Sir Douglas Bader on 10 November 1971. In 1976 a stained glass window in St Paul's Church on Thornaby Road was dedicated to the RAF at Thornaby and in 1997 a statue was erected on Thornaby Road dedicated to all who served at RAF Thornaby.

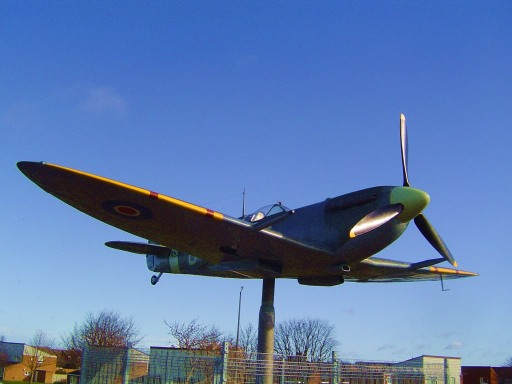
The Spitfire on Thornaby Road

In 2007 a full-size replica Supermarine Spitfire aircraft was erected on the roundabout at the junction of Thornaby Road, Bader Avenue and Trenchard Avenue. Hidden beneath the roundabout is part of a runway (one of three) which used to run east to west.

=== The town centre ===
The original northern town centre around Thornaby Town Hall declined after World War II with deindustrialisation and the town's population centre shifting south east on to the redeveloped site of the old airfield. As part of this expansion, a new town centre was built in the late 1960s incorporating the Pavilion Leisure Centre and two blocks of flats (Anson and Hudson House). In the 1980s, the A66 bypass road was constructed, separating the old town centre from the rest of Thornaby. Following the closure of the Head Wrightson site in 1987, the area north of the town hall was developed into the new Teesdale Business Park.

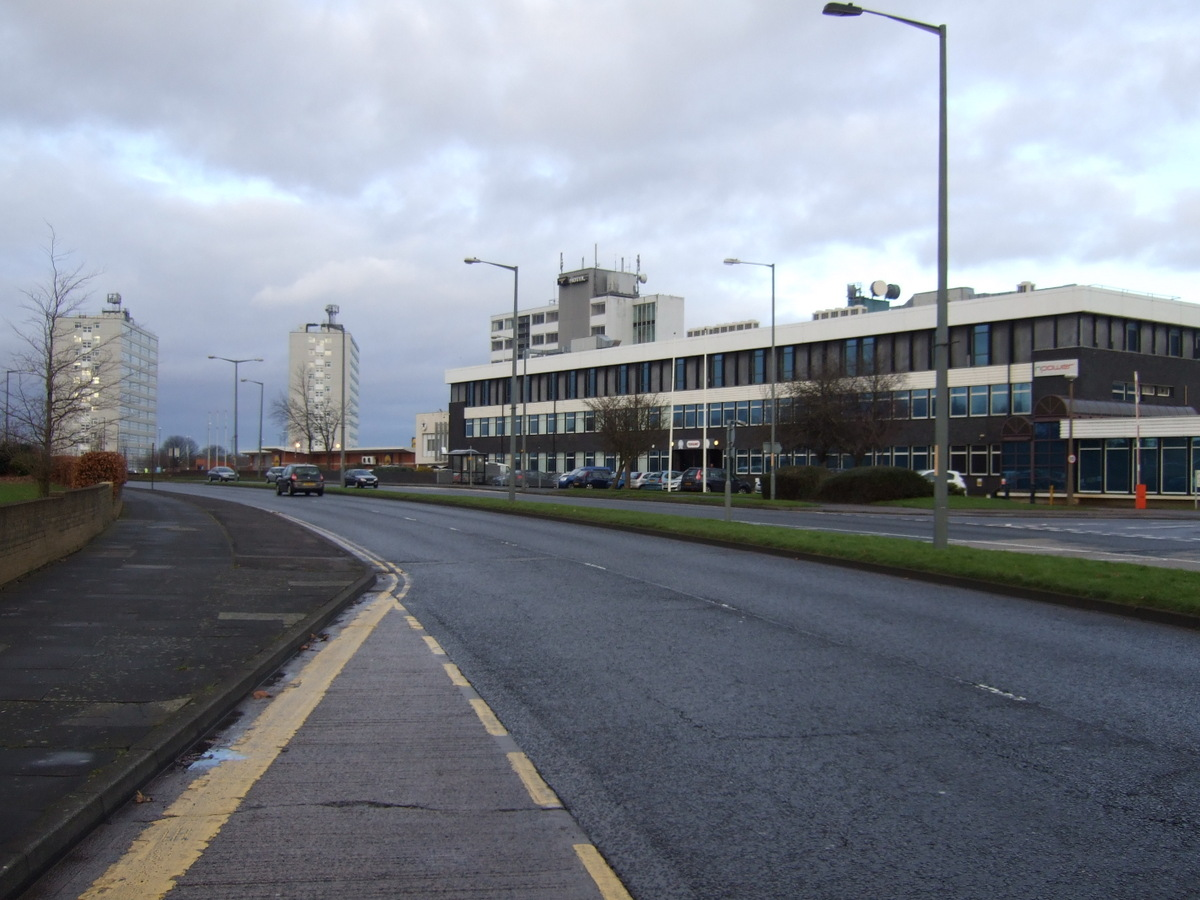
All four buildings (the two flats, hotel and offices) at a various stages of being demolished and replaced.

In the late 2000s, the town centre was redeveloped as the Pavilion Shopping Centre, with new shops opposite the existing Pavilion Leisure Centre and ASDA superstore. An official relaunch event was held in the new town centre on 25 April 2009. The high rise flats in the town centre have been demolished and with the towns fund, there are plans for a new swimming pool to be constructed on the site of the former NPower offices to replace the existing baths on Thornaby Road. The former Golden Eagle Hotel is also slated for demolition.

== Community and culture ==
Thornaby won a number of awards in 2008; the silver gilt award for best small cities, Northumbria in Bloom, which was repeated in 2011. Thornaby Cemetery had Cemetery of the Year award in 2006. The cemetery had lost then lost its Green flag award until 2011.

On 10 November 2011 an R.A.F. Search and Rescue Sea King Helicopter paid a three-hour visit to Bader primary to help celebrate the 40th anniversary of Sir Douglas Bader opening the school. The day of activities included a visit by representatives from RAF Leeming, the Commanding Officer at Catterick Garrison, Middlesbrough Armed Forces Careers Office and the Cleveland Mountain Rescue Team.

Thornaby held its eleventh Yorkshire Day event in August 2017. The annual Thornaby Show takes place at the beginning of September, it is estimated that more than 10,000 people turn up over the course of the day.

In January 2014 a McDonald's and Asda opened on the site of the former Tristar Neasham site. Teesside Park is the location of a shopping park which occupies a former racecourse.

== Governance ==
There are two tiers of local government covering Thornaby, at parish (town) and unitary authority level: Thornaby Town Council and Stockton-on-Tees Borough Council. The borough council is also a constituent member of the Tees Valley Combined Authority, which is led by the directly elected Mayor of Tees Valley. The town council is based at the Town Hall on Mandale Road.

=== Administrative history ===
Thornaby was historically a township and chapelry in the ancient parish of Stainton in the North Riding of Yorkshire. A local government district called South Stockton was established covering the northern part of the township in 1863, governed by a local board. In 1874 the district was enlarged to take in an area including Stockton Racecourse to the east of the original district. This area formed part of the parish of Stockton-on-Tees in County Durham, but had been cut off from the rest of Stockton-on-Tees when the River Tees had been straightened in 1810. The South Stockton local government district then straddled Yorkshire and County Durham until 1887, when the county boundary was also adjusted to follow the straightened course of the River Tees, after which South Stockton was again entirely in Yorkshire.

In 1892 the South Stockton Local Board was abolished when a municipal borough was created covering the whole township of Thornaby, with the new borough being named "Thornaby-on-Tees". It was amalgamated with other areas in 1968 to form the county borough of Teesside. In 1974, the town became part of the enlarged Stockton-on-Tees district of Cleveland non-metropolitan county.

Thornaby Town Council was created in 1995. Cleveland county was abolished in 1996 under the Banham review. In 1997 the parts of the abolished county of Cleveland south of the River Tees, including Thornaby, were placed in North Yorkshire for ceremonial purposes.

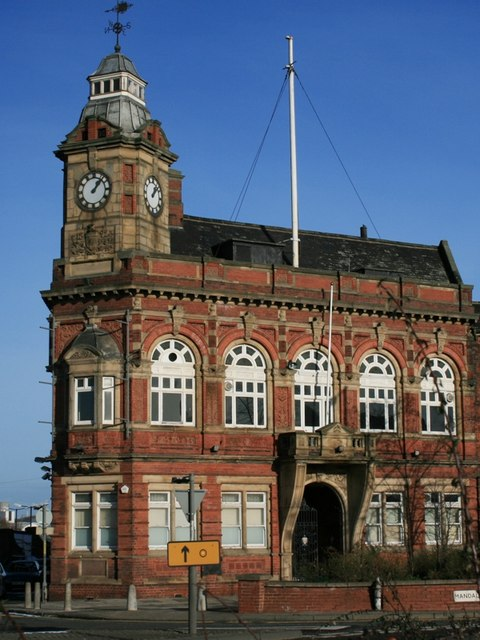
Thornaby Town Hall

In 2012 the town council purchased Thornaby Town Hall from the borough council for restorations. The hall, dating back to 1890–92, had been unoccupied since the 1968 county borough of Teesside amalgamation. It is now the main building used by Thornaby Town Council.

== Religion ==
=== Church of England ===
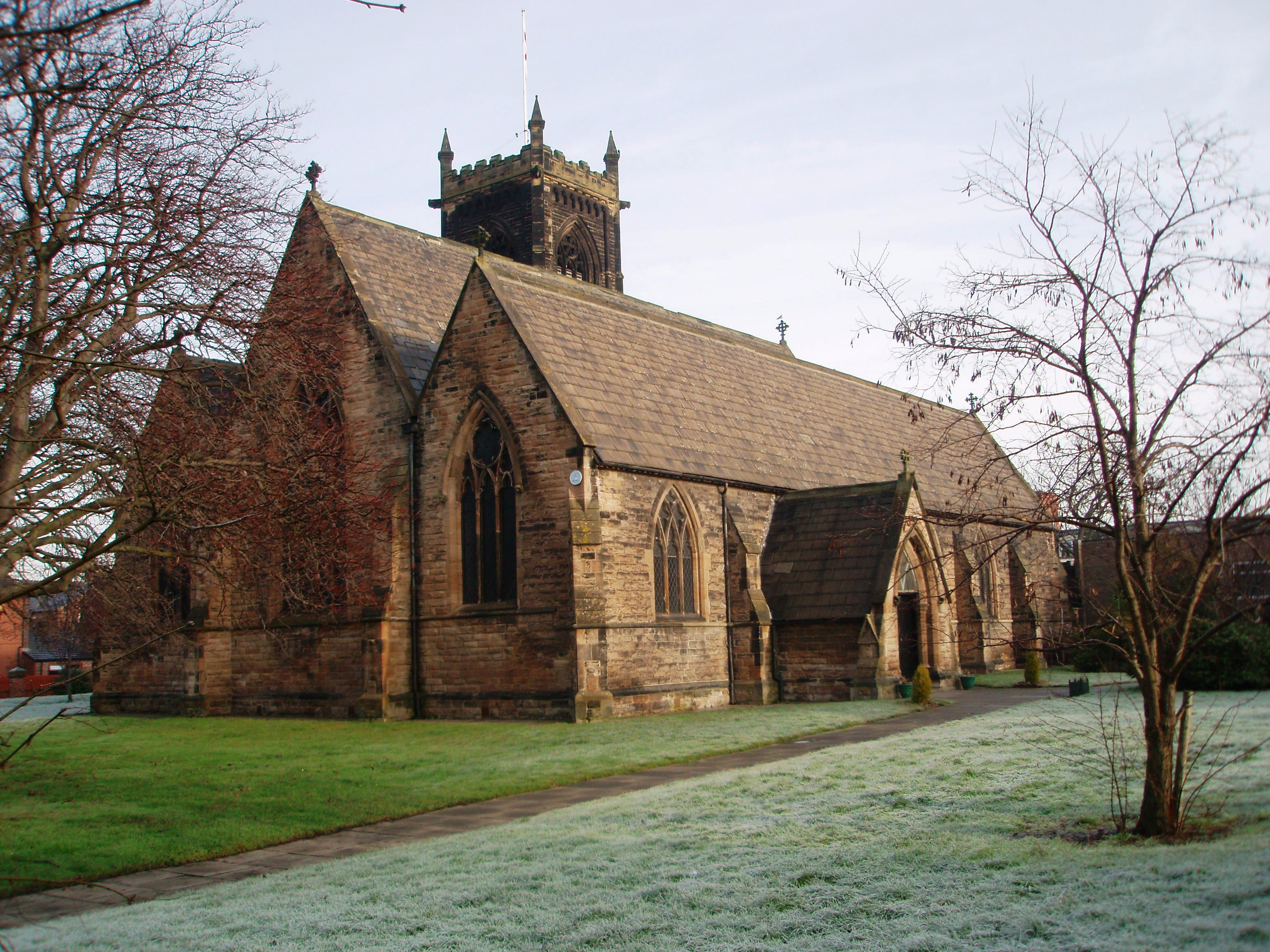
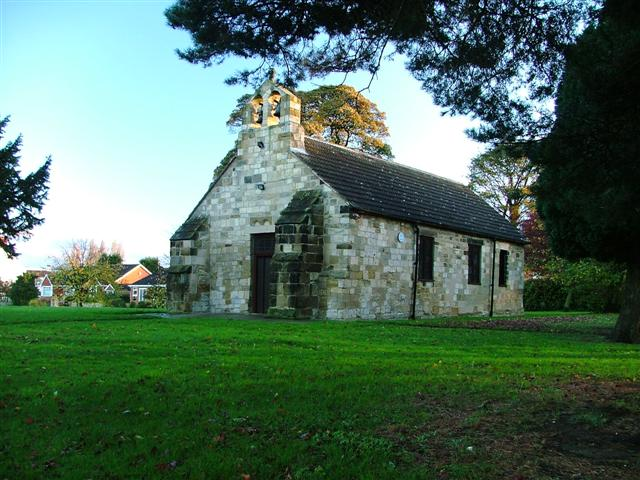
St Paul the Apostle and St Peter ad Vincula churches, Archdeaconry of Cleveland, Diocese of York, Province of York

The Church of St Peter ad Vincula on the village green is of 12th-century origin but a place of worship existed at the time of the Domesday Book of 1086. The unusual dedication to St Peter ad Vincula ("St Peter in chains") is derived from the ancient Basilica of San Pietro in Vincoli in Rome. The building, with a simple nave and a bell turret with two bells, was originally dedicated to St Mary Magdalene. Grace Pace, the mother of Captain James Cook, was baptised at St Peter's in 1702. The larger St Paul's serves most of the town.

== Sport ==
=== Acklam Road ===
Thornaby Cricket Club is situated at Mandale Bottoms (Acklam Road) and has been in existence since 1892. The main teams are in the North Yorkshire and South Durham Cricket League.

Teesside Golf Club opened in 1901. It is in of the Teesside and District Union of Golf Clubs and therefore the Yorkshire Union of Golf Clubs

Thornaby FC play in the Northern League Division one. It was established as 'Thornaby' in 2000. The club play at Teesdale Park ground, Acklam Road.

=== Thornaby Road ===
Thornaby and Ingleby Barwick Football Club (TIBS FC) play in the North Riding Football League division one, it was established in 1997. The club play at a grounds off Thornaby Road and train at Conyers School.

== Transport ==
=== Rail ===
The town is served by Thornaby railway station, operated by Northern Trains, who operate rail services to Newcastle, Sunderland, Darlington, Redcar, Hexham and Whitby. TransPennine Express provides direct rail services to Leeds, Liverpool, Manchester and York. LNER also provides a direct rail service to York and London Kings Cross.

=== Road ===
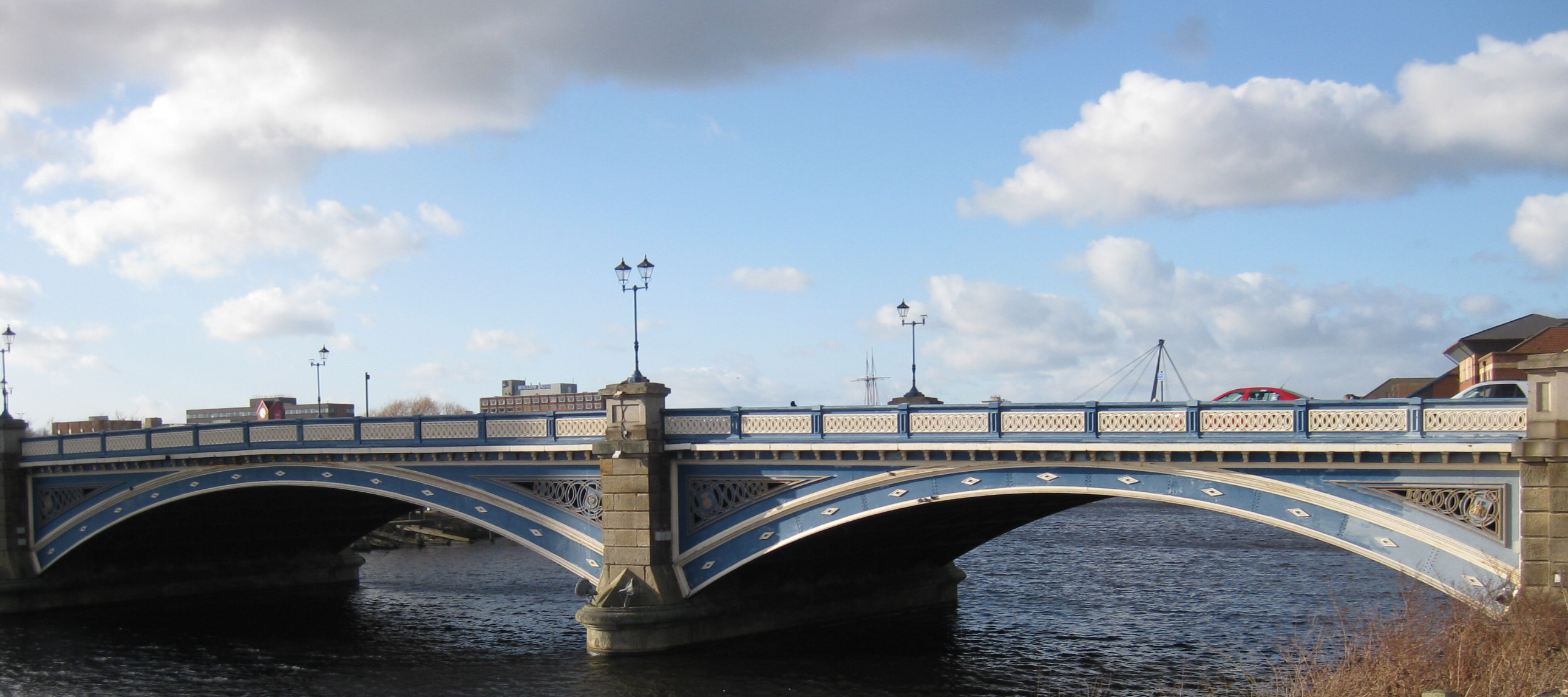
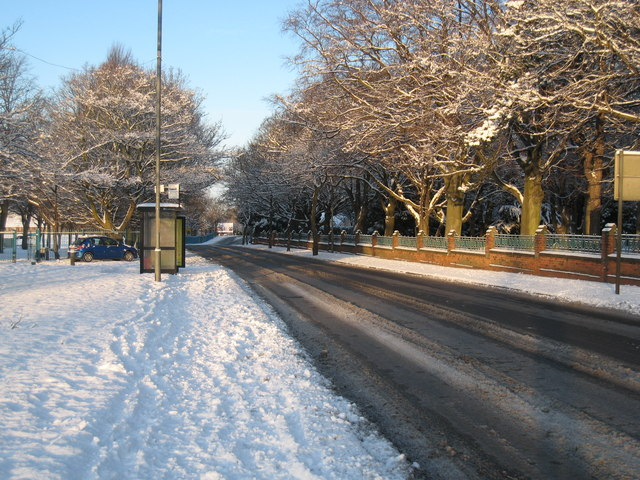
Victoria Bridge & A1130 (north-bound)

Thornaby is served by

- the A19 to the town's east heading north–south
- A66 to the town's north heading west/ east and
- A174 heading south east to Whitby.

Public Services Arriva North East and Stagecoach North East provide bus services to Thornaby and National Express and operates coach services from Middlesbrough bus station.

== Media ==
=== Television ===
Regional television services is provided by BBC North East and Cumbria and ITV Tyne Tees. The local based-television station TalkTeesside also broadcast to the town.

=== Radio ===
Local radio stations are BBC Radio Tees, Heart North East, Hits Radio Teesside, Capital North East, Smooth North East, Greatest Hits Radio Teesside and CVFM Radio, a community based station that broadcast from nearby Middlesbrough.

=== Newspapers ===
The town is served by the local newspaper, Evening Gazette.

== Education ==
=== Secondary ===
Thornaby is served by three secondary schools; St Patrick's Catholic College, Thornaby Academy and Westlands Academy.

=== College ===
Thornaby is home to Stockton Riverside College, a major provider of further education in the Tees Valley with around 10,000 full & part-time students. It is labelled Stockton due to it being in or near the former Stockton South settlement, which lied on the southern banks of the river Tees (Yorkshire) and merged into Thornaby on Tees.

=== University ===
Adjacent to the college is Durham University's Queen's Campus. This was founded in 1992 as a joint venture between Durham and Teesside universities, becoming exclusively part of Durham University in 1998. In 2019, the university moved the Queen's Campus colleges and departments to Durham city, and repurposed the campus as a new International Study Centre, run by Study Group.

== Notable people ==
- Grace Pace (the mother of Captain James Cook).
- Award-winning author Pat Barker lived in Millbank Lane and is best known for her Regeneration Trilogy of books about the First World War, the third of which, The Ghost Road won the 1995 Man Booker Prize.
- TV-Personality Holly Hagan, one of the original stars from MTV show Geordie Shore was born in Thornaby.
- Actor Richard Griffiths was born in Thornaby and was best known for his role as Vernon Dursley in the Harry Potter movies and as Uncle Monty in the cult film Withnail and I. He won many awards for his acting in the film The History Boys.
- Paul Curran – the championship cyclist was born in Thornaby.
- Max Jones, pupil at Robert Atkinson school, was a seven-time Olympic athletics coach and was the GB Team leader at the Sydney and Athens Olympic Games. Max was the Performance Director for UK Athletics 1997 to 2005.
- Norma Farnes was born and grew up in Thornaby. She went to London and ended up as Spike Milligan's and Eric Sykes's manager. Norma has edited and written several successful books.
