= Thornaby Town Hall =

Municipal building in Thornaby, North Yorkshire, England

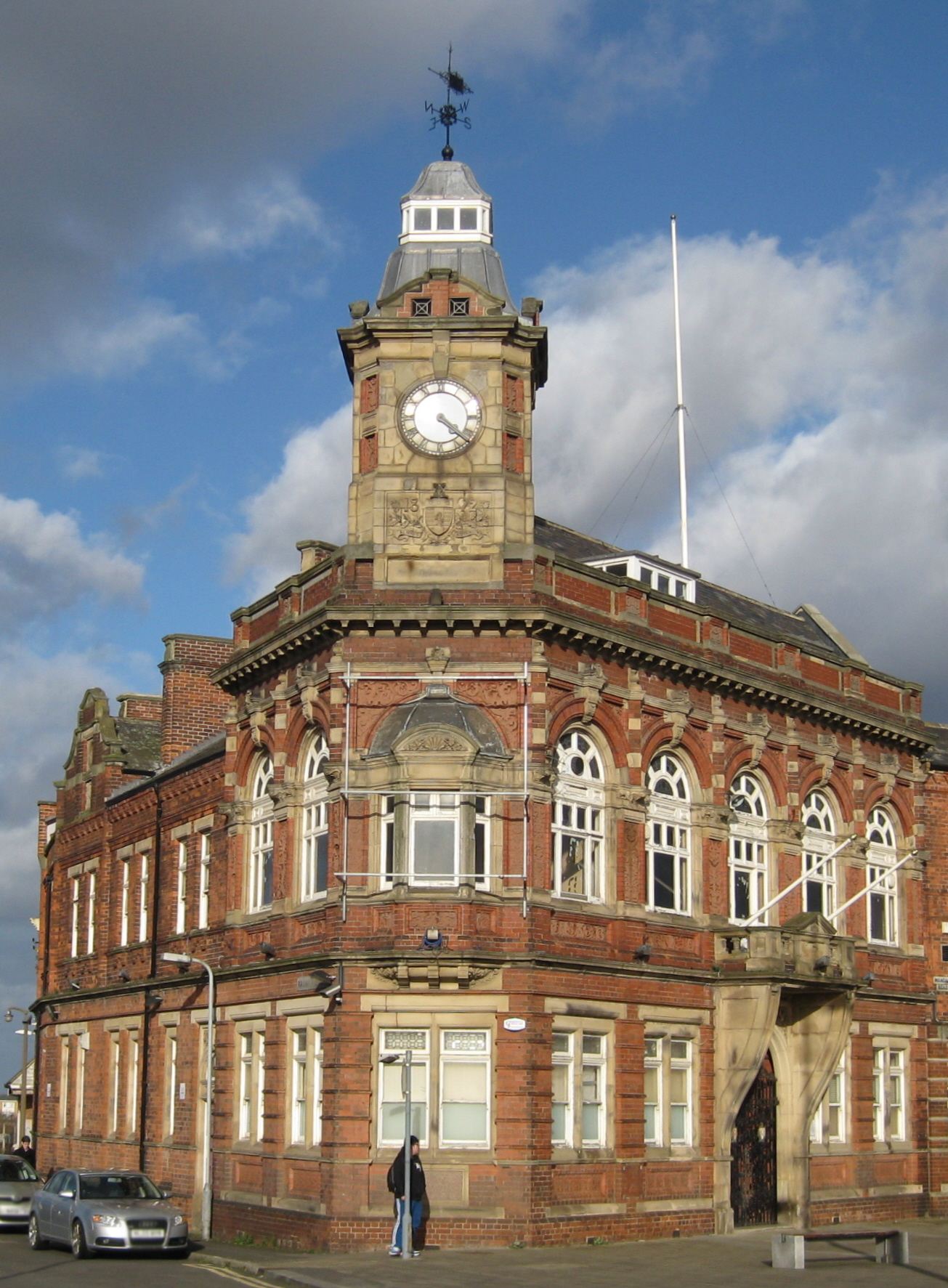
- Thornaby Town Hall

- Shown in North Yorkshire
- 54.5583°N 1.3027°W
- Location: Thornaby-on-Tees

History
- Built: 1892

Site notes
- Architect: James Garry
- Architectural style: Renaissance style

Listed Building – Grade II
- Official name: Former Town Hall
- Designated: 9 October 1992
- Reference no.: 1320257

Thornaby Town Hall is a municipal building in the Mandale Road in Thornaby-on-Tees, North Yorkshire, England. The building, which is owned by Thornaby Town Council, is a Grade II listed building.

== History ==
In anticipation of the proposed merger of Thornaby and South Stockton into the municipal borough of Thornaby-on-Tees municipal borough in 1892, civic leaders decided to commission a dedicated town hall. The site they selected was a developing area occupied by some clay pits in what had previously been close to the Mandale Marshes just south of South Stockton railway station.

The foundation stone for the new building was laid by the chairman of the South Stockton local board of health, John Steel, on 25 October 1890. It was designed by James Garry of West Hartlepool in the Renaissance style, built by W. C. Atkinson and was officially opened as Thornaby Town Hall in 1892.

The design involved a chamfered main frontage at the junction of Mandale Road and Railway Terrace; the corner section featured a double window on the ground floor, an oriel window on the first floor and a clock tower with cupola and weather vane above. The Mandale road elevation featured a doorway with brackets supporting an entablature and round headed windows with stained glass fanlights on the first floor; the Railway Terrace elevation had two bays with windows in a similar style to the Mandale Road elevation, but the bays further along the street displayed conventional sash windows on both floors. However, Nikolaus Pevsner said that the town hall exhibited "a totally undistinguished design on a visually most unsuitable site", in his 1933 The North Riding (Buildings of England) book. The quarter-chiming clock, which was made by Potts of Leeds and donated by the first mayor of the town, Alderman William Anderson, was started on 27 January 1892. Internally, the principal rooms were the council chamber and the mayor's parlour.

The building continued to serve as the headquarters of Thornaby Borough Council for much of the 20th century but ceased to be the local seat of government when the short-lived County Borough of Teesside was formed in 1967. It then remained largely unused, in the ownership of Stockton-on-Tees Borough Council from 1974, until Stockton Council decided to sell the building to a developer, Python Properties, in January 2010. After the sale to Python fell through in May 2011, Stockton Council carried out a consultation on its future use in September 2011. The consultation resulted in Thornaby Town Council, which had been formed in 1995, agreeing to acquire the building in May 2012 and completing the transaction in November 2012.

An extensive programme of renovation works costing £900,000, funded by the National Lottery Heritage Fund, was initiated by the town council in autumn 2017, with the intention that the works would act as a catalyst for further regeneration in the area. After the actual cost of renovation exceeded the budget by £250,000, the town's mayor, Steve Walmsley, indicated in November 2019 that the extra cost would be recovered through council tax increases.

A stone memorial to commemorate the lives of the 33 people from Thornaby who died in the Dibbles Bridge coach crash was unveiled outside the town hall on the 47th anniversary of the crash in May 2022.
