= Mountain rescue in Wales =

Rescue teams covering mountains in Wales

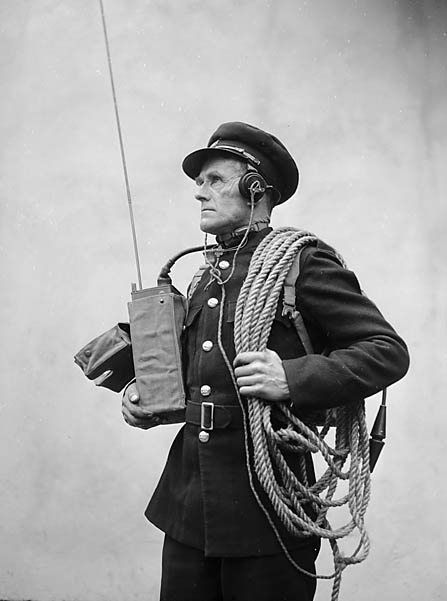
A member of a rescue team in Snowdonia; November 1952 by Geoff Charles (1909-2002)

Mountain rescue in Wales is the search and rescue activities that occur in the mountainous and other wilderness environments in Wales. Wales is largely mountainous with its higher peaks in the north and central areas, including Snowdon (Yr Wyddfa), its highest summit. Mountain rescue teams are called out through the police, via the 999 system, to assist police, fire and ambulance. They also work closely with the Air Ambulance and HM Coastguard helicopters as well as the search and rescue dog associations and cave rescue.

Voluntary mountain rescue teams in Wales are independent charities whose members are highly trained volunteers, who offer a free service and who are called out by the police. Some are members of the 'Mountain Rescue England and Wales' organisation.

About 375,000 people walk the paths to the summit of Snowdon every year; around 1% will need assistance to come down the mountain.

== Organisations ==
South

The co-ordinating body for the South is covered by the South Wales Search and Rescue Association, and include:

- Brecon MRT
- Central Beacons MRT
- Longtown MRT
- South & Mid Wales Cave Rescue Team (SMWCRT)
- Western Beacons Mountain SART
- SARDA South Wales (Mountain Rescue Search Dogs)

North

The co-ordinating body for the North is the North Wales Mountain Rescue Association:

- Aberglaslyn MRT (Porthmadog)
- Aberdyfi Search and Rescue Team
- HM Coastguard MRT 83 (Holyhead)
- Llanberis MRT
- North East Wales Search & Rescue (NEWSAR)
- North Wales Cave Rescue Organisation (NWCRO)
- Ogwen Valley Mountain Rescue Organisation
- South Snowdonia Search & Rescue
- SARDA Wales (Mountain Rescue Search Dogs)
- Royal Air Force Mountain Rescue Service

SARDA Wales

Search and Rescue Dog Association Wales are a group of volunteers who go out to search for missing people anywhere in Wales. Many SARDA Wales dog handlers are also members of Mountain Rescue teams and also offer their services to Police, Mountain Rescue & Coastguard. There are two groups: one for the North and another in the South.

RAF

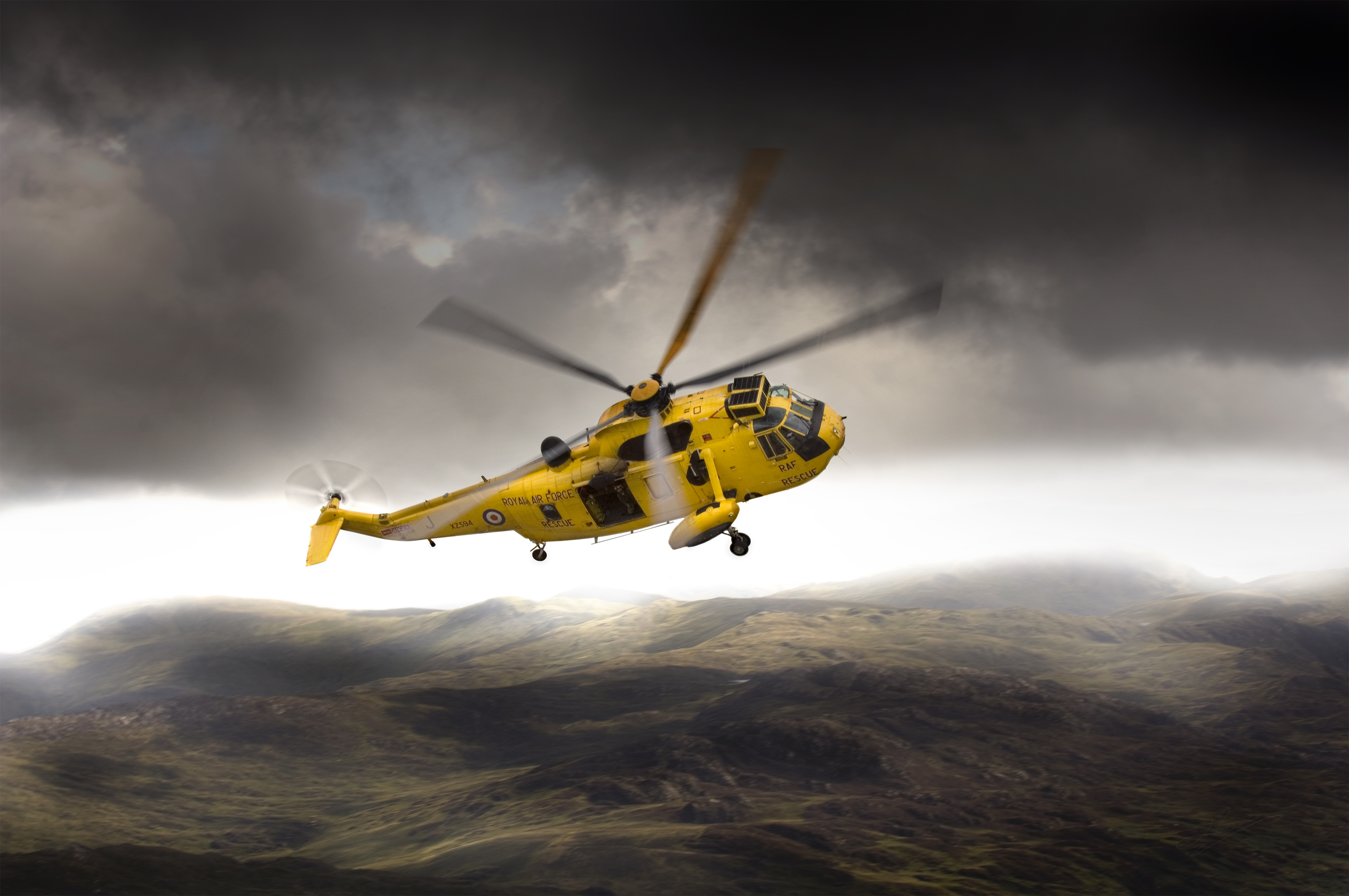
A Search and Rescue (SAR) SeaKing helicopter from RAF Valley, during a training sortie in the Snowdon mountains of the North.

The Royal Air Force Mountain Rescue Service has a teams in Wales – and as part of the military is wholly government funded. They have primary responsibility for aircraft crashes on high ground, but also respond to civilian calls for assistance from hikers and climbers.

Caves

North Wales Cave Rescue Organisation is a registered charity operates from and is a member of the British Cave Rescue Council and North Wales Mountain Rescue Association. but some teams operate as both cave rescue teams and mountain rescue teams. South and Mid Wales Cave Rescue Team (SMWCRT) is a registered charity which was initially set up in 1946 for Swansea and Neath Valleys. Since then, howevers, the team's area of responsibility covers South and Mid Wales. They provide technical support to Mountain Rescue Teams, search for missing people and provided assistance on the Tham Luang cave rescue in 2018.

== Mountain Rescue England and Wales ==
Mountain Rescue England and Wales is a Charitable Incorporated Organisation with its main offices in Tamworth, England. It supports mountain rescue groups in:

- North Wales Mountain Rescue Association (NWMRA) - 6 teams: Aberdyfi, Aberglaslyn, Llanberis, NEWSAR, Ogwen Valley and South Snowdonia.
- The South Wales Search and Rescue Association (SWSARA) - 5 teams: Brecon, Central Beacons, Longtown, Western Becons and South Wales.

== See also ==
- Mountain rescue in England and Wales (a Charitable Incorporated Organisation)
- Mountains and hills of Scotland
- National parks of Wales
- Snowdon
