= Scarborough and Ryedale Mountain Rescue Team =

The Scarborough and Ryedale Mountain Rescue Team provides Search and Rescue services in and around the Scarborough and Ryedale areas of North Yorkshire, England. The team has no formal southern boundary and has carried out searches in the urban fringe areas of the East Riding of Yorkshire

== History ==
It was founded in 1965 as the Scarborough and District Search and Rescue Team to help rescue walkers lost or injured on the North York Moors, England. It was originally started by the North York Moors National Park voluntary rangers who saw a need to provide a service to the increasing numbers of walkers using the moors. Included in this was the famous Lyke Wake Walk which attracted many thousands each year to attempt to walk its 46 miles (74 km) in less than 24 hours. In 2003 new recruits to the team were followed by a television film crew for the BBC's Inside Out programme. Today the role of the team has expanded to reflect the needs of the local emergency services.

== Status ==
The team is a registered charity (no. 256085) and a member of North East Search and Rescue Organisation, one of the regional divisions of Mountain Rescue England and Wales. The formal statement of Objectives is

"To relieve suffering and distress amongst persons affected by accidents or natural hazards on the North York Moors, or any other place if requested.

Today the team has evolved into a specialist urban-fringe search group.

== Activities ==
The team performs a variety of search operations (assisting the police) and occasionally provides communications and search and rescue support for organised events. It has a base at Snainton, near Scarborough. Miss England 2007, Georgia Horsley, a keen hill-walker from North Yorkshire, supported the team's appeal for funds for a specially-adapted response vehicle costing £48,000.

The team experienced their busiest year in 2018 when they responded to 89 callouts. The previous record was in 2016 when they had 87 callouts with a lower demand of 79 in 2017.
