= Mountain rescue in England and Wales =

UK rescue services

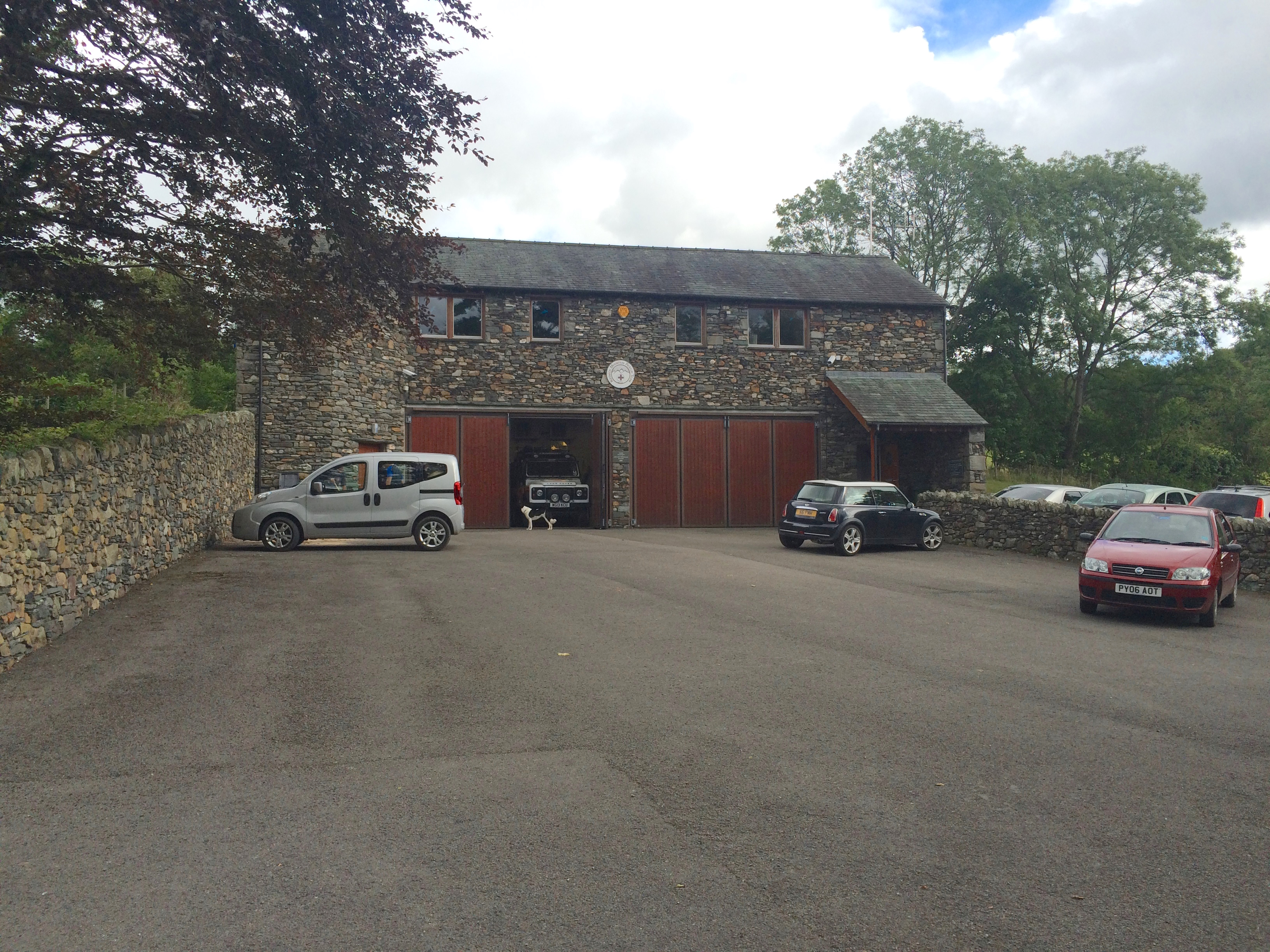
Keswick MRT station, containing training rooms, operational HQ, and four-bay emergency appliance garage.

Mountain rescue services in England and Wales operate under the association of Mountain Rescue England and Wales (MREW), formerly called Mountain Rescue Council of England & Wales. The association has a number of regional mountain rescue teams, each of which is an independent charity. The team members are highly trained volunteers who are called out by the police.

MREW is a member of the International Commission for Mountain Rescue (German: Internationale Kommission für Alpines Rettungswesen / IKAR-CISA).

== Overview ==
The Battenburg markings used by mountain rescue

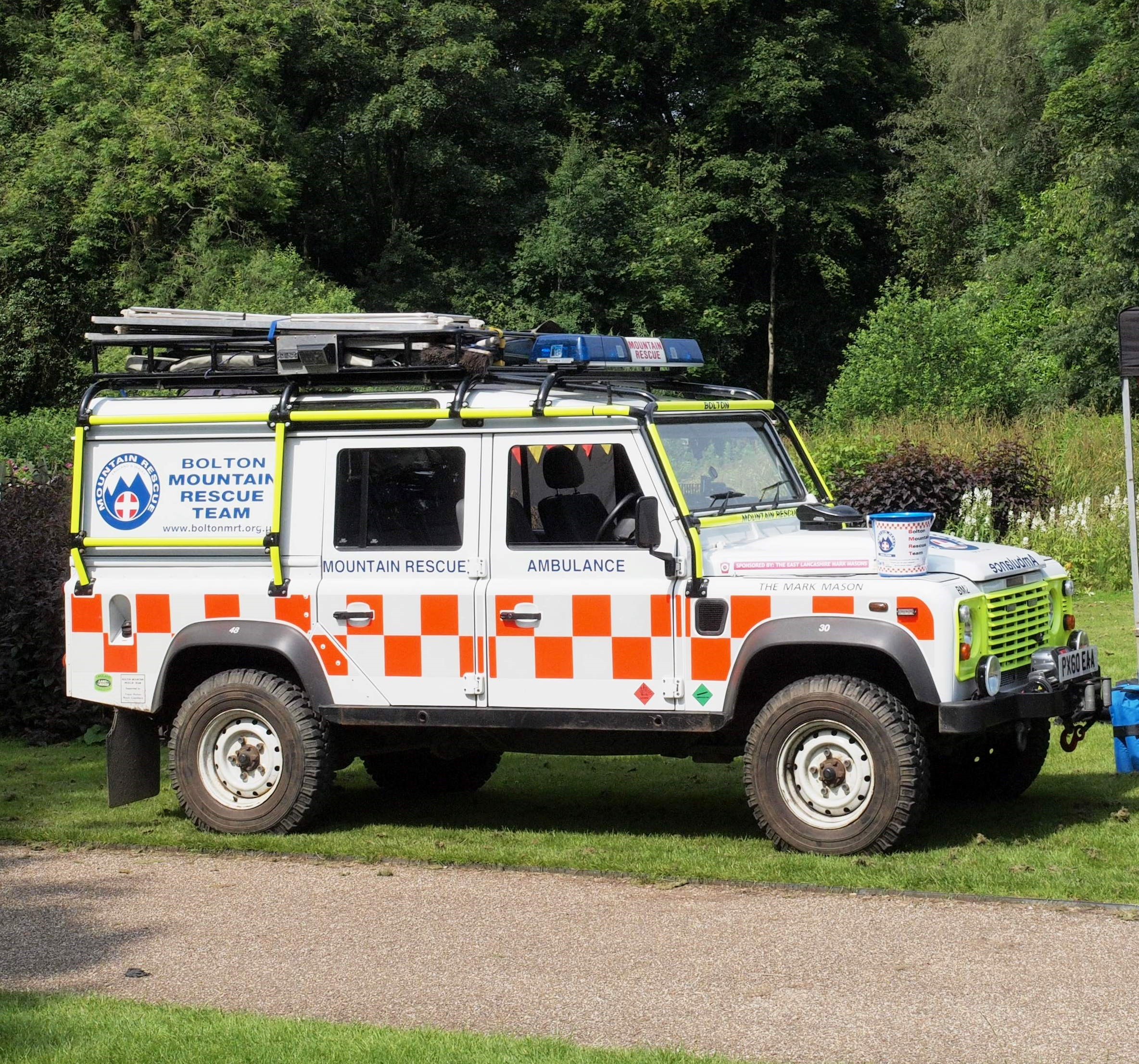
Mountain rescue ambulance used by Bolton MRT

Voluntary mountain rescue teams in England and Wales are independent charities whose members are highly trained volunteers who are called out by the police. The police are legally responsible for land based search and rescue but generally lack the resources to discharge this function effectively. Individual teams are normally known as an MRT (mountain rescue team) but some use the term SRT (search and rescue team) or MS&RT (mountain search and rescue team).

Individual teams are members both of the MREW and of their regional association (which is also represented at MREW). Neither MREW nor the regional associations have authority over the individual teams but provide an opportunity to discuss and agree standards, training and equipment. MREW does provide some equipment funding for MRTs both from its own funds and via a small government grant, but teams have to finance their own running costs through charity fund-raising or sponsorship. MRTs in England and Wales receive no direct government funding. The government provides access by teams to Ordnance Survey mapping.

The Royal Air Force Mountain Rescue Service has three teams – one in Scotland, one in England and one in Wales – and as part of the military is wholly government funded. They have primary responsibility for aircraft crashes on high ground, but also respond to civilian calls for assistance from hikers and climbers.

Although the primary focus of mountain rescue is to locate and evacuate injured and/or lost persons in upland environments, teams also undertake a wide range of roles which may differ from team to team:

- missing person searches in lowland areas where access or terrain is difficult;
- support to NHS ambulance services for difficult casualty evacuation;
- support to government agencies/emergency services in flood and heavy snowfall;
- support to government agencies/emergency services at major incidents;
- swift water rescue;
- animal rescue.

Urban search and rescue is currently undertaken by the fire and rescue services as part of their statutory enablement, but at least one mountain rescue team has chosen to train in this field.

Each team has its own primary area of responsibility but frequently deploy outside these areas in support of other teams.

Cave rescue has its own umbrella organisation, the British Cave Rescue Council, but some teams operate as both cave rescue teams and mountain rescue teams.

There are also regional organisations dedicated to the training of search dogs and their handlers. England has two associations, Mountain Rescue Search Dogs England (MRSDE) and the Lake District Mountain Rescue Search Dog Association (LDMRSD). Wales also has two associations the Search and Rescue Dog Association Wales (SARDA Wales) responding to incidents in North Wales and the Search and Rescue Dog Association South Wales (SARDA South Wales). Handlers must be full team members of a mountain rescue team and, once graded, will operate alongside that team, but can also be deployed in support of other teams.

== Organisation ==
The association has 49 regional mountain rescue teams, each of which is an independent charity:

=== England ===
==== Lake District ====
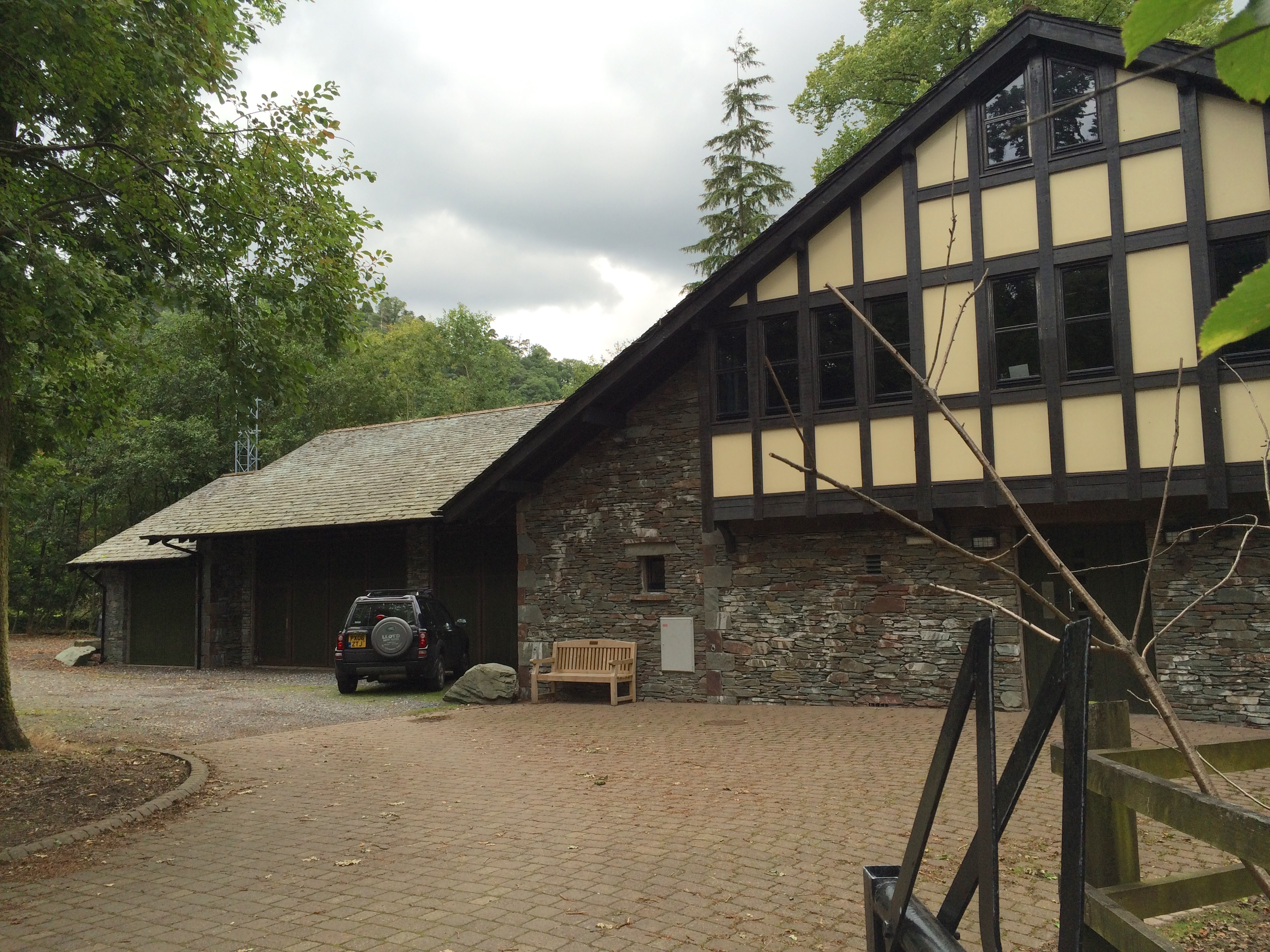
Patterdale MRT station. The 3-storey building contains operational HQ and training facilities, whilst the farther buildings are garages for emergency appliances.

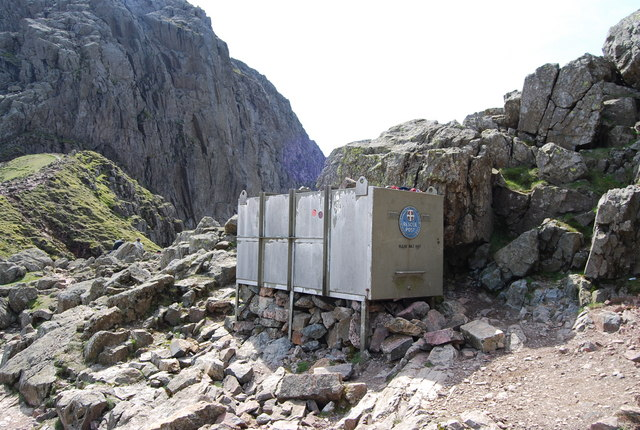
Mountain rescue post, Sca Fell

The co-ordinating body for Mountain & Mine Search and Rescue Teams in the Lake District is the Lake District Search & Mountain Rescue Association:

- Cockermouth MRT
- Coniston MRT
- COMRU (Cumbria Ore Mines Rescue Unit)
- Duddon and Furness Mountain Rescue Team
- Kendal MRT
- Keswick MRT
- Kirkby Stephen MRT
- Langdale/Ambleside MRT
- Patterdale MRT
- Penrith MRT
- Lake District Mountain Rescue Search Dogs
- Wasdale MRT
- Royal Air Force Mountain Rescue Service

==== Pennines ====
The co-ordinating body for Search & Rescue in caves, moors, and hills in West Yorkshire, Lancashire, Greater Manchester and the Pennines is the Mid Pennine Search & Rescue Organisation:

- Mid Pennine Search & Rescue Organisation
- Bolton MRT
- Bowland Pennine MRT
- Calder Valley SRT
- Cave Rescue Organisation (CRO)
- Holme Valley MRT
- Rossendale and Pendle MRT
- SARDA England (Mountain Rescue Search Dogs)

==== North East ====
The co-ordinating body for North East is the North East Search & Rescue Association:

- Cleveland MRT
- North of Tyne MRT
- Northumberland National Park MRT
- Swaledale Mountain Rescue Team (Catterick Garrison, North Yorkshire)
- Teesdale & Weardale SMRT
- SARDA England (Mountain Rescue Search Dogs)

==== Peak District ====
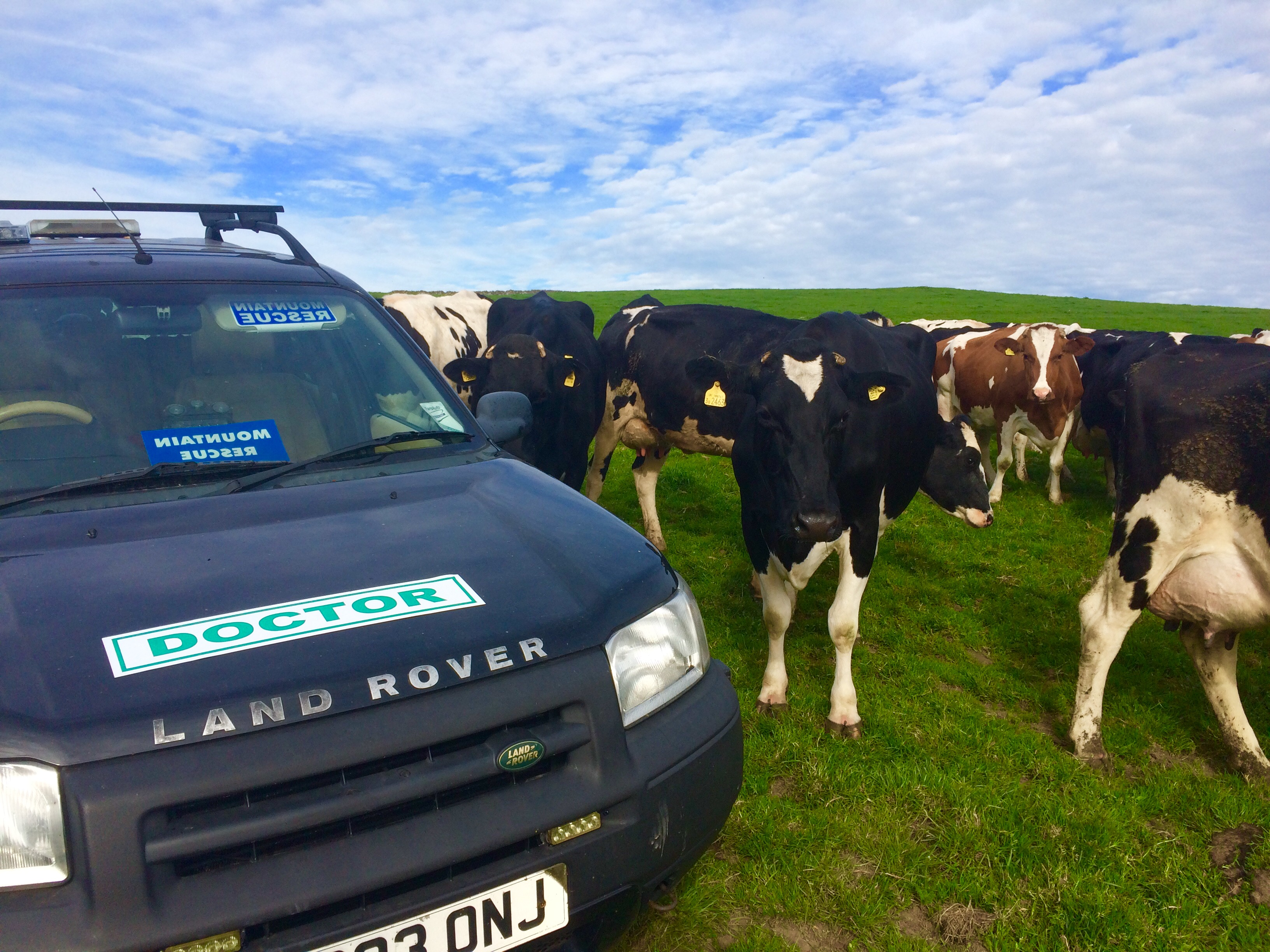
Mountain Rescue doctor's car in the Peak District

The co-ordinating body for the Peak District is the Peak District Mountain Rescue Organisation which was formed in 1964:

- Buxton Mountain Rescue Team
- Derby MRT
- Derbyshire Cave Rescue Organisation (DCRO)
- Kinder MRT
- Edale MRT
- Glossop MRT
- Oldham MRT
- Woodhead MRT
- SARDA England (Search And Rescue Dog Association)

==== West Country and the South West ====
The West Country of England is covered by the South West England Rescue Association:

- Gloucestershire Cave Rescue Group
- Mendip Cave Rescue Organisation
- Severn Area Rescue Association

The South West of England is covered by the "Peninsula Mountain and Cave Rescue Association":

- Dartmoor Search and Rescue Team Ashburton
- Dartmoor Search & Rescue Team Plymouth
- Dartmoor Search & Rescue Team Tavistock
- Devon Cave Rescue
- East Cornwall Search & Rescue Team
- Exmoor Search & Rescue Team
- North Dartmoor Search & Rescue Team
- West Cornwall Search & Rescue Team

Not currently affiliated to a region:

- Avon and Somerset Search & Rescue

==== Yorkshire Dales ====
The Yorkshire Dales are covered by the Yorkshire Dales Rescue Panel:

- Cave Rescue Organisation (CRO)
- Scarborough and Ryedale mountain rescue team
- Upper Wharfedale Fell Rescue Association (UWFRA)

=== Wales ===
==== North ====
The co-ordinating body for North Wales is the North Wales Mountain Rescue Association:

- Aberglaslyn MRT (Porthmadog)
- Aberdyfi Search and Rescue Team
- HM Coastguard MRT 83 (Holyhead)
- Llanberis MRT
- North East Wales Search & Rescue (NEWSAR)
- North Wales Cave Rescue Organisation (NWCRO)
- Ogwen Valley Mountain Rescue Organisation
- South Snowdonia Search & Rescue
- SARDA Wales (Mountain Rescue Search Dogs)
- Royal Air Force Mountain Rescue Service

==== South ====
The co-ordinating body for South Wales is covered by the South Wales Search and Rescue Association:

- Brecon MRT
- Central Beacons MRT
- Longtown MRT
- South & Mid Wales Cave Rescue Team (SMWCRT)
- Western Beacons Mountain SART
- SARDA South Wales (Mountain Rescue Search Dogs)

== See also ==
- Mountain rescue in Wales
