= Holme Valley Mountain Rescue Team =

The HVMRT Land Rover

The Team on exercise on Pule Hill Crags, Marsden

The Holme Valley Mountain Rescue Team is a voluntary organisation that functions as a search and rescue service covering the southern half of West Yorkshire. It is a registered charity entirely funded by public contributions.

The team takes its name from the valley of the River Holme, one of several rivers that pass through its area. However this name is more of historical than current significance. The team's headquarters are in Marsden, near Huddersfield and in the valley of the River Colne.

== History ==
The team was set up initially as the Holme Valley Moorland Rescue Team in 1965 after the death of two Boy Scouts taking part in a Challenge Hike on local moorland.

Originally based in the Holme Valley town of Meltham, the team relocated to Marsden in 2005, occupying part of the town's fire station. When the West Yorkshire Fire Service closed the Marsden fire station in 2013, the rescue team raised £60,000 to buy it, unveiling it as their official base in April 2015.

== Role ==
Since its foundation, the team has continued to provide assistance to those who get into difficulties while taking part in leisure activities on nearly 400 square miles (1,000 km^{2}) of the South Pennines and Northern Peak District.

The team's role is not confined to aiding those who get into difficulties on high ground, however. Assistance is often provided to West Yorkshire Police on searches for missing persons in rural and semi-rural areas, and to Yorkshire Ambulance Service when casualties need to be extracted from less accessible locations. The team also helps local groups and charities by providing event safety cover, talks and education.

Training exercises are held regularly to maintain a high skills and knowledge base within the team. This includes search techniques, casualty care and handling, crag and ropework, and maintenance and use of the team's own specialist equipment. On a call out, the Holme Valley Mountain Rescue Team may work in partnership with neighbouring teams, or other organisations such as the Police, Fire and Ambulance services, the RAF and the West Yorkshire Air Ambulance, and holds training exercises jointly with these groups to maintain an effective partnership.

The Holme Valley MRT is a member of the Mid Pennine Search and Rescue Organisation (MPSRO); a regional body of which the following organisations are also members:

- Bolton MRT
- Bowland Pennine MRT
- Calder Valley SRT
- Rossendale and Pendle MRT
- The Cave Rescue Organisation
- The Search and Rescue Dog Association (SARDA)

The HVMRT is a Registered Charity (No. 1015532) and a Limited Company by Guarantee (No. 2764292).

== Team equipment ==
The Holme Valley MRT owns and maintains a great deal of specialist equipment. This needs to be constantly checked and replaced to meet regulations and this process accounts for a very large proportion of the team's expenditure. The team runs three vehicles:

1. Mobile 1 – A customised Isuzu D-Max pickup truck
2. Mobile 2 – A Volkswagen Transporter Control Vehicle
3. Mobile 3 – A customised Isuzu D-Max pickup truck

All vehicles are registered ambulances and are fitted with blue strobes. They each carry medical and communications equipment, as well as 'party kits' – equipment taken out by each hill party to aid in the initial stabilisation of a casualty, before more specialised equipment can be brought to the scene.

The specialist control vehicle (Mobile 2) contains, in addition to the above, additional radio equipment, computer equipment and welfare items and is typically deployed on long engagements, such as searches.

A long wheelbase Land Rover Defender, and a Vauxhall Movano van were previously used by the team but have now been retired.

== See also ==
- Mountain Rescue
- Mountain Rescue England & Wales
