= Cleveland Mountain Rescue Team =

British search and rescue team

Cleveland Mountain Rescue Team (or Cleveland MRT) is a search and rescue team serving north-eastern Yorkshire and south-eastern County Durham, England. They were called out to 61 incidents in 2019 and 58 in 2020.

The team, based in Great Ayton, serves an area between Sandsend, the north of Hartlepool, Hurworth and Dishforth, a large part of its area being the North York Moors. It is a member of the North East Search and Rescue Association; other teams in the regional body serve Northumberland National Park, North of Tyne, Swaledale and Teesdale-and-Weardale.

== History ==
The team was founded in 1965 and is currently (2020) staffed by 50 members, both men and women. Originally, the team was known as Cleveland Search and Rescue, and was a sister operation to the Ryedale Search and Rescue Team. Both had formed in response to the number of people who were injured or lost attempting the Lyke Wake Walk.

The team have twelve members trained in specialist recovery techniques in flooded water situations (swift water rescue). These skills were used during the 2015 flooding in York. The Department of Transport donated £3,500 to the team in 2017, to allow them to purchase a trailer for their rescue equipment. The team operates with three vehicles; one large van with communication and mapping equipment that acts as a command and control vehicle, and two Land Rovers. Cleveland MRT's base of operations is located in Great Ayton, North Yorkshire, and Lord Crathorne is the president.

Like other mountain rescue teams, the Cleveland MRT has its own area which is concentrated around Cleveland and other northern parts of the North York Moors. However, requests from what is outside of their traditional area are taken, which has seen the team deployed as far north as Kielder Forest and Blackhall Rocks. The team is dedicated to searches and rescues in the North East region alongside other mountain rescue teams; Northumberland National Park Mountain Rescue Team, North of Tyne Mountain Rescue Team, Swaledale Mountain Rescue Team, and Teesdale and Weardale. Together, the Mountain Rescue Association list this as being the North East Search and Rescue Association.

Roseberry Topping, which is on the border between North Yorkshire and Cleveland, is an often visited location for the team. On average, the team are called out twelve times a year to accidents and incidents at the location, so much so, that the MRT and the North York Moors National Park Authority, improved access for 4x4 vehicles.

== Call-outs ==
Below are listed some of the notable call-outs that the team have been called out to;

- 1976 – The team were required to help extinguish the moorland fires on the North York Moors, which saw them out on an average of one night in every two over a fortnight.
- 1988 – The team were deployed to Kielder Forest in December 1988 to search for debris from the Lockerbie disaster. What they found was mostly personal effects of those on board.
- 2005 – The team were drafted in to help search woods near Richmond for an absconded man who was suspected of murdering Jenny Nicholl.
- 2015 – The team's Swift Water Rescue skills were needed during the 2015 floods in York
- 2018 – The team rescued 30 runners in the North York Moors who were attempting the Hardmoors 55 run. This ultramarathon starts in Helmsley and finishes in Guisborough, some 55 miles (89 km) further on. The course rises 2,700 feet (820 m) and on the day, bad weather arrived after the runners had set off.

== Yearly call-outs ==
- 2013 – 62
- 2014 – 50
- 2015 – 42
- 2016 – 37
- 2017 – 63
- 2018 – 78
- 2019 – 61
- 2020 – 58
- 2021 – 61
- 2022 – 61
- 2023 – 54

== See also ==
- Mountain rescue in England and Wales
