= Upper Wharfedale Fell Rescue Association =

British charitable organization

The Upper Wharfedale Fell Rescue Association is based in Grassington in the Yorkshire Dales of northern England, and provides help to people and animals in difficulty in the caves and on the fells around Wharfedale, Nidderdale, Littondale and Mid-Airedale. Although it is staffed by approximately 80 volunteers and funded by donations, it is integrated into the emergency services and is called out by the police when there is an appropriate incident. The Upper Wharfedale Fell Rescue Association was founded in 1948, and is the third oldest such team in the UK.

Major incidents which have occurred in the area for which the Association is responsible include the Mossdale Caverns incident in 1967 during which six cavers drowned when the system suffered catastrophic flooding, and an incident in Sleets Gill Cave in 1992 when rising water levels required two trapped cavers to be dived out through 200 m (656 ft) of flooded passages. This was the first major use of diving gear to rescue non-divers in the UK, and in the following year a reconstruction of the incident was shown on Tyne Tees Television. Members attended the team's 1,000th callout in March 2012.

The history of UWFRA was documented in the 1988 book Anytime...Anywhere: the First Fifty Years of the Upper Wharfedale Fell Rescue Association written by members of the UWFRA.

== See also ==
- British Cave Rescue Council
- Mountain rescue in England and Wales
