= Church of St Peter ad Vincula, Thornaby-on-Tees =

Anglican church in North Yorkshire, England

Church of St Peter, Thornaby
- Church of St Peter ad Vincula, Thornaby
- Old Church of St Peter; St Peter's Church, Thornaby
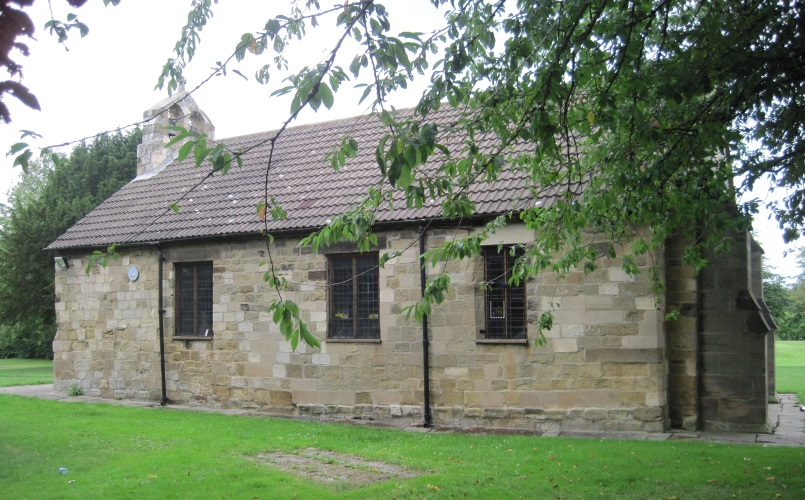
- Thornaby, Old St Peters
- Church of St Peter, Thornaby
- 54.541°N 1.305°W
- OS grid reference: NZ 45055 16438
- Location: Thornaby-on-Tees, North Yorkshire
- Country: England
- Denomination: Church of England
- Website: Official webpage

History
- Dedication: St Peter (in chains)

Architecture
- Functional status: Active
- Style: Norman

Specifications
- Length: 40 feet (12 m)
- Width: 17 feet 6 inches (5.33 m)

Administration
- Diocese: York
- Archdeaconry: Cleveland
- Deanery: Middlesbrough
- Benefice: South Thornaby
- Parish: St. Mark and St. Peter ad Vincula South Thornaby

Listed Building – Grade II*
- Designated: 19 January 1951
- Reference no.: 1139917

The Church of St Peter ad Vincula, Thornaby, is an Anglican church in Thornaby, North Yorkshire, England. The structure, which is grade II* listed, is dated to the 12th century, replacing an earlier building on the same site. The church is noted for being the supposed baptismal location of Grace Pace, Captain Cook's mother.

Historically the church was known as St Mary's, but was rededicated to St Peter ad Vincula after an early twentieth century renovation. It is sometimes referred to as the Old Church of St Peter, as the newer development of South Stockton, later known as Thornaby-on-Tees, had a new church built to accommodate its growing population.

== History ==
The Domesday Book states that Thornaby had a church in 1086, however, the current structure has been dated to the 12th century. Originally dedicated to St Mary Magdalen(e), it was rededicated as St Peter ad Vincula (St Peter in Chains) after the basilica of San Pietro in Vincoli in Rome. The rededication occurred in 1908, just after it underwent a major renovation.

In 1495, when the church was dedicated to St Mary Magdalene, the church was tied to the priory at Guisborough. The income from the church and that of an agricultural cottage and land nearby, paid for the five lamps that lit the church and the surrounding green. The five lamps were placed there to light a shrine to St Mary (the dedication) by Robert de Thormodbi, who suffered a severe wounding during a Crusade encounter at Acre in the 13th century. de Thormodbi swore that if he survived his wounding, he would build a shrine to St Mary.

The church is located on high ground just east of the River Tees and formed part of the ancient village of Thornaby, on what is now Thornaby Green. The old village of Thornaby, was centred around the church, supposedly the oldest building in the area, and a few houses built around it, with a long village green. The industrialisation on the Tees meant a newer settlement developed on The Carrs (by the mid 1800's the area had been re'named 'South Stockton') about two mile north of Thornaby Village. This led to another church being built in Thornaby-on-Tees as the Church of St Peter could only seat 80 people. (Note: The Carrs/South Stockton, Mandale and Thornaby Village were merged into one township on 6 October 1892.) St Peter's was historically described as being a chapel, or a chapel of ease as it was within another parish.

A prevailing local legend states that Grace Pace, the mother of Captain Cook, was baptised in the church. Whilst it is known that she was born and lived in what was the village of Thornaby, some have pointed out that at the time of her baptism, (c. 1702), the church was not the mother building in the parish of Stainton, and most likely, baptisms, marriages and funerals were held elsewhere. However, the church retains an original Norman font, so baptisms are assumed to have been undertaken at some point in the history of the church.

Originally in the parish of Stainton, the church became the mother church of its own parish (Thornaby-on-Tees) in 1844, but this was quite short, as by 1858, St Paul's Church in Thornaby became the mother church for the parish. In 1869, the 6-acre (2.4 ha) graveyard was officially opened (the earliest listed burial being 1746), only to close to burials in 1870. However, burials still continued of those who had close relatives interred in the churchyard, so that they "might have the privilege of being buried there on their decease [sic]." Some burials are listed for St Peter's up to 1905.

In the 1970s, the lych gate was removed and the area around the church was landscaped which removed most of the headstones to the edges of the churchyard.

== Architecture ==
The original design of the building was in the Norman Romanesque style, and the church itself consists of one single room, 40 feet (12 m) in length by 17 feet 6 inches (5.33 m). The thickness of the outer walls vary from side to side, though some do hold evidence of pre-conquest architecture. Some of the stones in the south wall show evidence of re-use; at least two have dials cut into them representing twenty-four hours. The two buttresses on the east facing wall, were added in the 15th century when the church was renovated, with a bellcote, situated at the west end of the church, dating from around the same time. Internally, the design of the columns and the roof has crossed leaves, something which is rare in North Yorkshire, being recognised in only one other church in the area, that at St Wilfrid in South Stainley. Some of the supporting columns have been dated to the 12th century.

A chancel is known to have been on the eastern end of the church, but this was removed at some unknown date, and the access arch through the east side was walled up. The pantile roof is modern, the original being installed (c. 1908), but a more modern roof was installed c. 1950. A new roof is being installed over 2020 and 2021 with Welsh slate. A plaque dedicated to No. 608 Squadron RAF, who were formed at RAF Thornaby in 1930, is affixed to one of the church's walls.

== Parish ==
The current vicar of the church is Reverend Tom Bates-Bourne who was appointed in January 2024. Previously, the church (and parish) were located in the Deanery of Cleveland. It is now in the Deanery of Middlesbrough, the Archdeaconry of Cleveland, and the Diocese of York.
