= Thornaby railway station =

Railway station in North Yorkshire, England

Thornaby
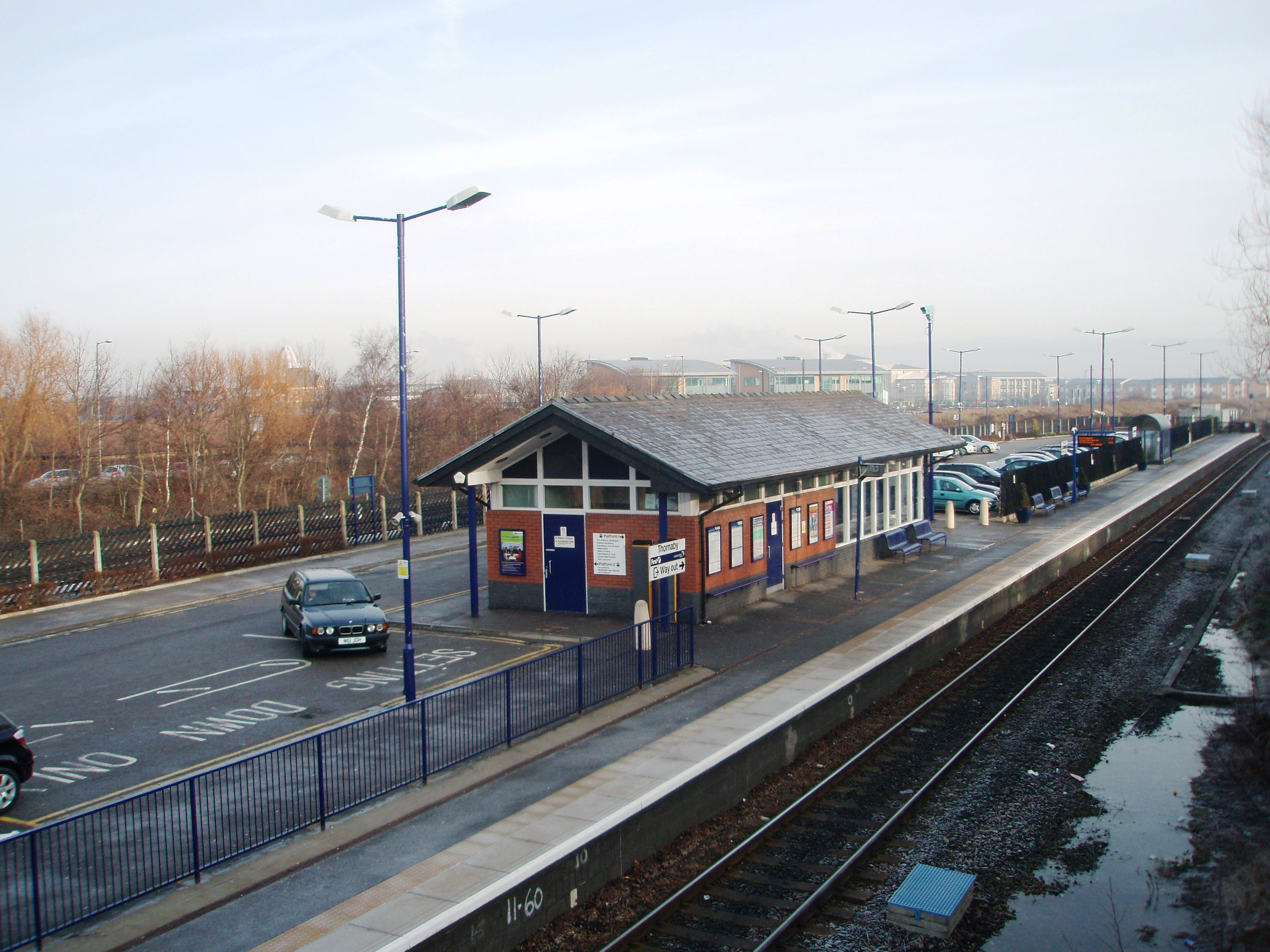

General information
- Location: Thornaby, Borough of Stockton-on-Tees; England
- Coordinates: 54°33′33″N 1°18′07″W
- Grid reference: NZ453184
- Owner: Network Rail
- Manager: TransPennine Express
- Platforms: 2
- Tracks: 3

Other information
- Station code: TBY
- Classification: DfT category F2

History
- Original company: North Eastern Railway
- Pre-grouping: North Eastern Railway
- Post-grouping: London and North Eastern Railway; British Rail (North Eastern Region)

Key dates
- 1 October 1882: Opened as Stockton South
- 1 November 1892: Renamed Thornaby

Passengers
- 2020/21: ▼0.156 million
- Interchange: 12,558
- 2021/22: ▲0.444 million
- Interchange: ▲42,522
- 2022/23: ▲0.511 million
- Interchange: ▲46,054
- 2023/24: ▲0.586 million
- Interchange: ▲57,834
- 2024/25: ▲0.660 million
- Interchange: ▲60,295
Location
- Location within North Yorkshire
Notes
- Passenger statistics from the Office of Rail and Road

Thornaby, originally South Stockton, is a railway station on the Tees Valley Line, which runs between Bishop Auckland and Saltburn via Darlington. The station, situated 3 miles 17 chains (5.2 km) south-west of Middlesbrough, serves the market town of Thornaby-on-Tees, Borough of Stockton-on-Tees in North Yorkshire, England. It is owned by Network Rail and managed by TransPennine Express. It is the nearest operating station to the original Stockton Railway Station of the Stockton & Darlington Railway.

== History ==
=== Origins ===
The station lies on the original Stockton & Darlington Railway (S&DR) extension to Port Darlington, developed from 1828 under the instructions of influential Quaker banker, coal mine owner and S&DR shareholder Joseph Pease, who had sailed up the River Tees to find a suitable new site down river of Stockton on which to place new coal staithes. As a result, in 1829 he and a group of Quaker businessmen bought 527 acres (213 ha) of land described as "a dismal swamp", and established the Middlesbrough Estate Company. Through the company, the investors intended to develop both a new port, and a suitable town to supply its labour. On 27 December 1830, the S&DR opened an extension along the southern bank of the river to a station at Newport, almost directly north of the current Middlesbrough station. The S&DR quickly later renamed this new station and associated six-coal staithe dock facility as Port Darlington, hoping to market the facility further. The port was so successful that a year after opening the population of Port Darlington had reached 2,350. However, with Port Darlington overwhelmed by the volume of imports and exports, in 1839 work started on Middlesbrough Dock. Laid out by Sir William Cubitt, the whole infrastructure was built by resident civil engineer George Turnbull. After three years and an expenditure of £122,000 (equivalent to £11,928,000 in 2025), it was formally opened on 12 May 1842. On completion, the docks were bought by the S&DR.

As Middlesbrough developed, additional railway facilities were required to marshall goods wagons, and to allow workers to access the docks and associated industries. So the North Eastern Railway (NER) built South Stockton railway station, which opened on 1 October 1882. However, in 1892 Parliament granted a charter that created the Borough of Thornaby-on-Tees, which incorporated the village of Thornaby and South Stockton, and so on 1 November 1892 the name of the station was also changed.

Thornaby was located on a busy and hence important section of the line for the NER, between Newport and Middlesbrough Docks to the east, and Bowesfield Junction in Stockton to the west (where the Northallerton/Darlington and Durham Coast Lines diverge), which had the busiest signal box on the NER system. The main station structure had a glass-covered entrance in a unique design of ironwork, which led to a booking office and waiting rooms for four classes. It was built of brick, with additional stonework in creamy yellow stone. Carved embracing the Arts and Crafts Movement of William Morris, a competition between local stonemasons resulted in 104 different designs. The competition was noted on a brass plaque in the entrance area, but this was removed and melted down for the war effort during World War II. The platform canopies were also of an ironwork design unique to Thornaby, but lost their glass when a wartime German bomb fell close to the station.

=== Nationalisation ===
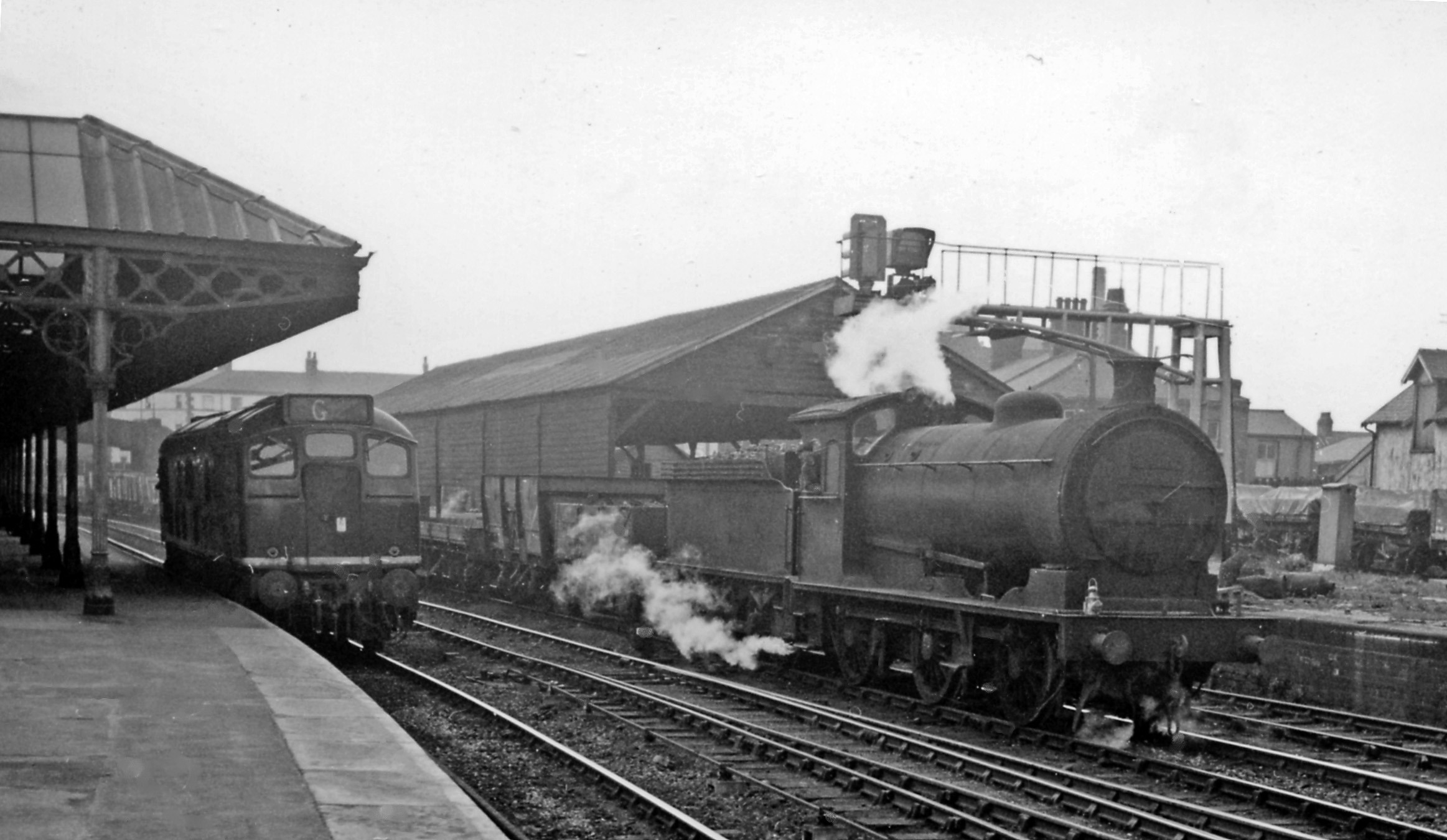
Down freight and a diesel light engine in 1961

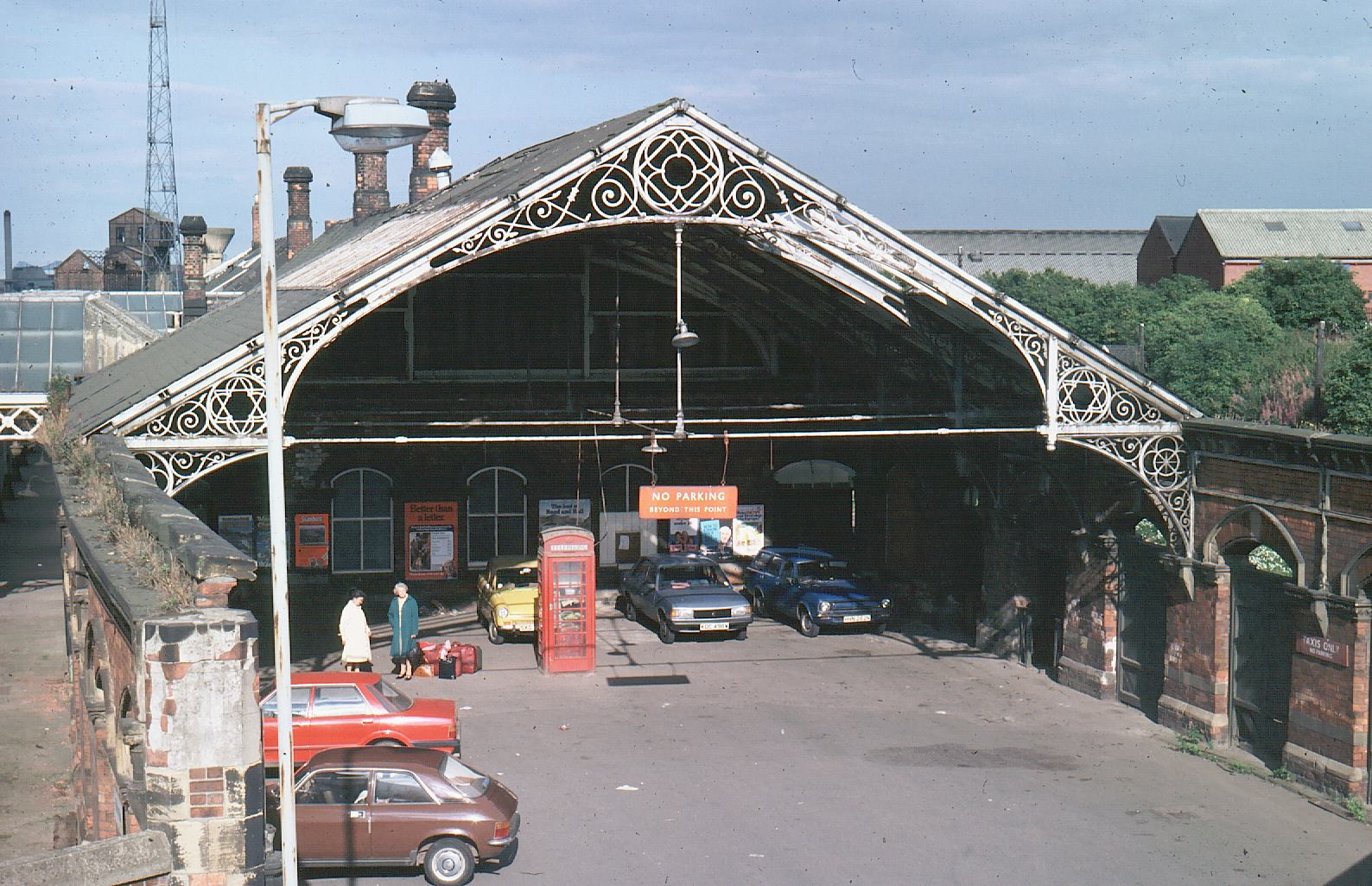
Thornaby station's former buildings seen in September 1981

After being taken over by British Railways on nationalisation, the decayed station was never really repaired post war, but kept its proud staff and hence well kept flower borders. The variety of stone carvings also gained the station an entry in the newly created Guinness Book of Rail Facts and Feats. With dwindling passenger numbers, staff were removed in the early 1970s, which led to a dramatic level of vandalism to the decayed station structures. After promises to refurbish the station due to local protests from 1977, the station buildings were demolished in December 1981 in what was described locally as "institutionalised vandalism". In both 1988 and 1994, BR proposed renaming the resulting "bus shelter" station as Stockton, but this and a later proposal in 2000 by Northern Spirit to rename the station as South Stockton were stopped by local protests.

The station was revived, because it is near the Teesdale development area and Durham University's Queen's Campus, and because of the new First TransPennine Express to Manchester Airport. This resulted in a £500,000 refurbishment in 2003 led by Arriva Trains Northern, the Strategic Rail Authority and Stockton-on-Tees Borough Council, including the addition of waiting rooms for the first time in 25 years.

The newly rebuilt station was formally opened by former local MP Dari Taylor on 7 February 2003. There are an enlarged car park, a heated waiting room, a staffed ticket office, a shop, VDU displays and better lighting and security. As a result of this improvement work, and the return of staffing, Thornaby won a National Station of the Year Award in the 2003 HSBC Rail Awards.

In November 2023 the station was mentioned in the news after a woman fell victim to a scam involving a QR code in the station's car park, when the genuine QR code was covered by one designed by fraudsters. After the woman lost £13,000 from her bank accounts, TransPennine Express removed all QR codes from their stations.

=== Tees Valley Metro ===
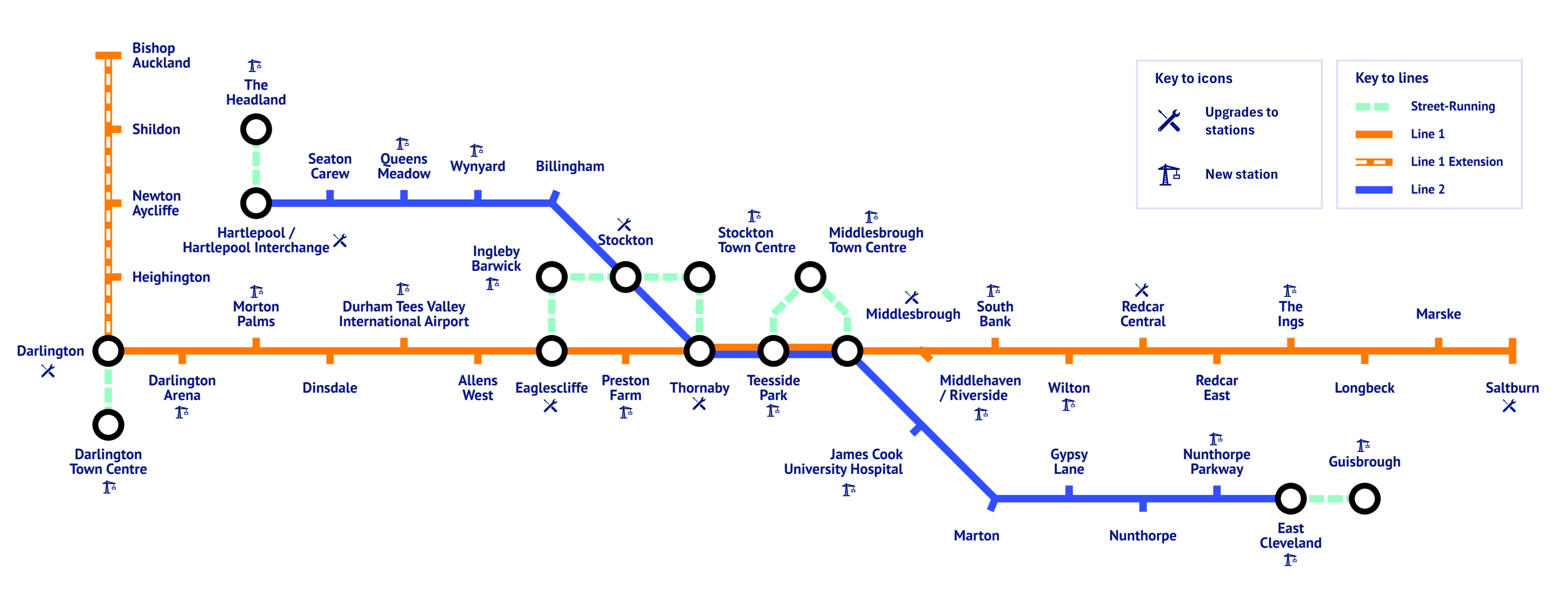
Transit diagram showcasing all discussed or mentioned ideas for the Tees Valley Metro.

Starting in 2006, Thornaby was mentioned within the Tees Valley Metro scheme. This was a plan to upgrade the Tees Valley Line and sections of the Esk Valley Line and Durham Coast Line to provide a faster and more frequent service across the North East of England. In the initial phases the services would have been heavy rail mostly along existing alignments with new additional infrastructure and rollingstock. The later phase would have introduced tram-trains to allow street running and further heavy rail extensions.

As part of the scheme, Thornaby station would have received improved service to Darlington and Saltburn (1–2 to 4 trains per hour) as well as to Nunthorpe and Hartlepool, possibly a street-running link to Guisborough and the Headland, and new rollingstock. There was also plans of the footbridge being replaced with a modern structure.

However, due to a change in government in 2010 and the 2008 financial crisis, the project was ultimately shelved. Several stations eventually got their improvements and there is a possibility of improved rollingstock and services in the future which may affect Thornaby.

== Services ==
=== London North Eastern Railway ===
London North Eastern Railway operate a daily return service between Middlesbrough and London King's Cross, calling at Thornaby.

As of the December 2021 timetable change, the station is served by one train per weekday each way. More services are planned following the completion of station works at Middlesbrough.

=== Northern Trains ===
==== Durham Coast Line ====
As of the winter 2025 timetable change, the station is served by two trains per hour service between Newcastle and Middlesbrough. Some trains continue to Hexham and Carlisle (these are express up to Harlepool and Sunderland), and to Nunthorpe. One continues to Whitby. An hourly service runs on Sundays.

==== Tees Valley Line ====
As of the December 2023 timetable change, the station is served by two trains per hour between Saltburn and Darlington via Middlesbrough, with one train per hour extending to Bishop Auckland. Two trains per day extend to Newcastle via Durham and Chester-Le-Street.

An hourly service operates between Saltburn and Bishop Auckland on Sunday.

=== TransPennine Express ===
As of the December 2024 timetable change, the station has an hourly service between Redcar Central and Manchester Airport via York. From December 2024, all services now run via Yarm with 2 trains per day extending to Saltburn with a third starting from Saltburn in the early morning.

Preceding station	National Rail	Following station
York	London North Eastern Railway; East Coast Main Line; Middlesbrough–London	Middlesbrough
Stockton	Northern Trains; Durham Coast Line	Middlesbrough
Eaglescliffe	Northern Trains; Tees Valley line	Middlesbrough
Eaglescliffe	TransPennine Express; North TransPennine	Middlesbrough
