= Cleveland, Yorkshire =

Area in northeast England

Coordinates: 54.500°N 1.134°W

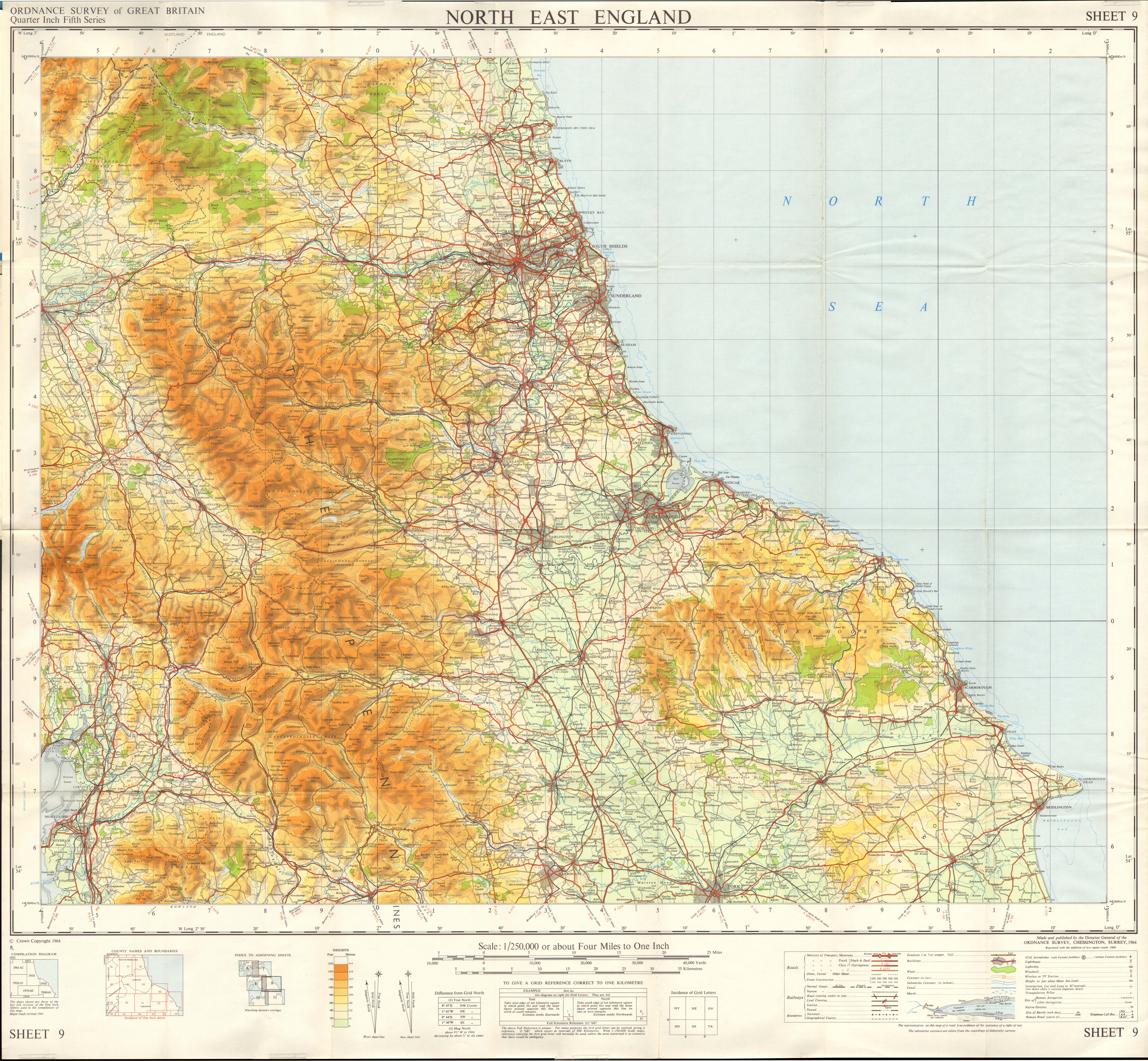
Ordnance Survey map of northeast England, with Cleveland labelled

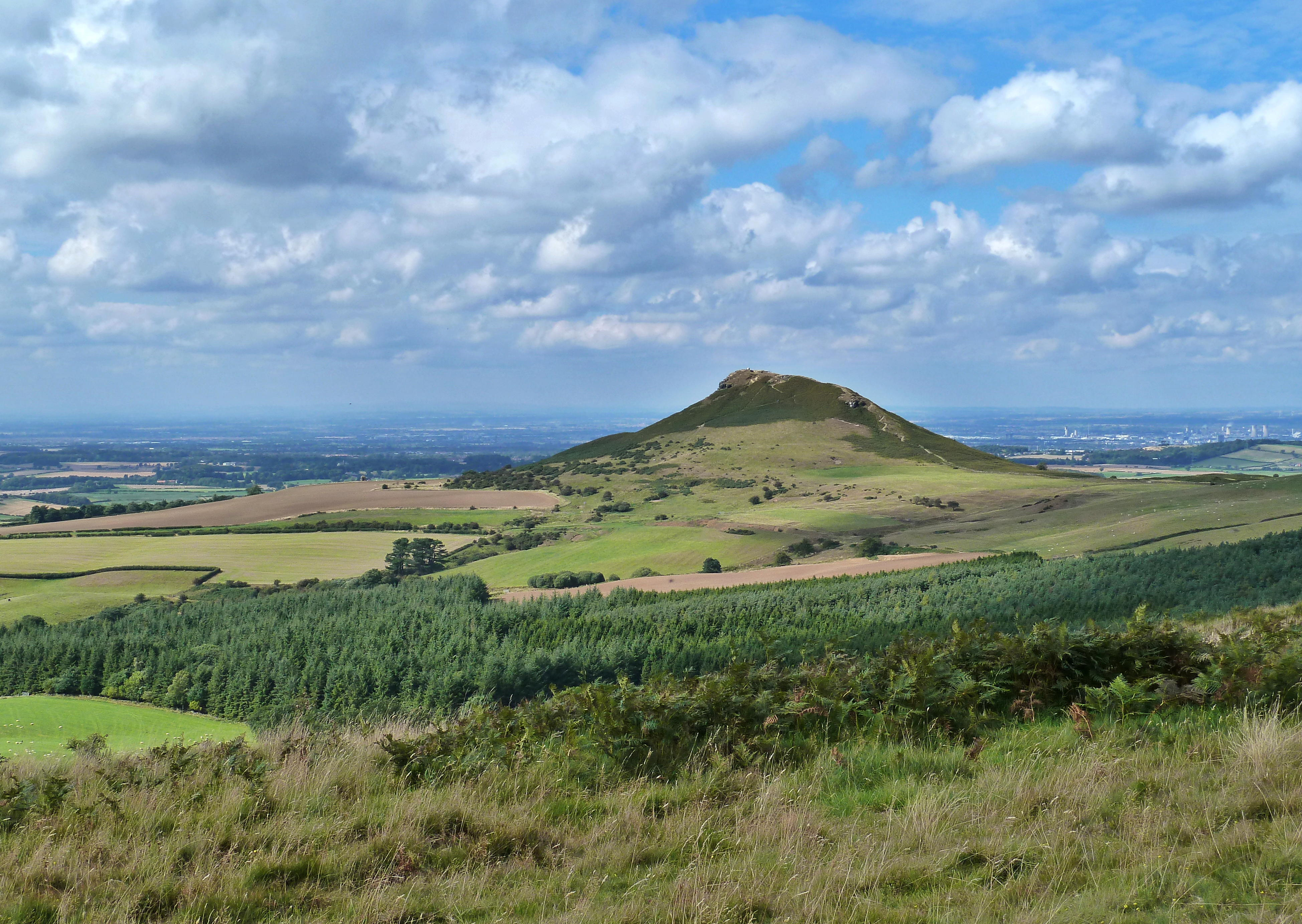
Roseberry Topping, with industrial Teesside visible on the right

Cleveland (/ˈkliːvlənd/) is an area of North Yorkshire, England, lying between the River Tees and the North Sea on one side and the North York Moors on the other. It is coextensive with the old wapentake of Langbaurgh. The name comes from the Old English clifa land, meaning "district of cliffs".

This area is not the same as the administrative county of Cleveland (1974–1996), which covered a smaller area and included land on the north side of the Tees, in what had been County Durham.

== Industry ==
The Cleveland Hills were key suppliers of the ironstone that was essential to running blast furnaces along the River Tees. Cleveland's rich ore has created a significant industrial heritage, arising from its central role in the 19th-century iron boom that led to Middlesbrough growing from a hamlet into a major industrial town in only a matter of decades. Teesport is one of the United Kingdom's main ports, initially due to the iron boom, with other heavy industrial plants between Middlesbrough and Redcar.

== See also ==
- Cleveland Bay
- Cleveland Way
- Cleveland Mountain Rescue Team
- Cleveland Police
- Cleveland Bridge & Engineering Company
- Cleveland Centre, Middlesbrough
