= Swaledale Mountain Rescue Team =

Rescue team in North Yorkshire, England

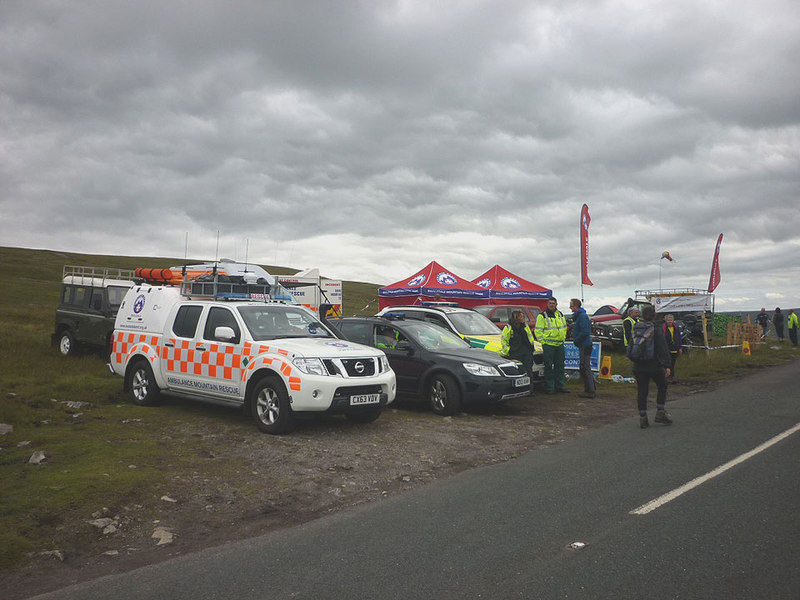
Swaledale Mountain Rescue Team on top of the Buttertubs Pass

The Swaledale Mountain Rescue Team (SMRT), is a voluntary organisation that undertakes search and rescue primarily in the Swaledale and Wensleydale area of the Pennines in North Yorkshire, England. Like other mountain rescue teams, SMRT does not confine itself to the immediate area and will respond to calls by emergency services and the public alike across a broad expanse of Northern England.

== History ==
The team was formed in July 1968 with 12 local men; they now have a complement of 40 volunteers both male and female. A lottery grant of £425,698 allowed the team to build a new headquarters on Hipswell Road West within Catterick Garrison in 2001.

In 2015, the SMRT signed a joint working agreement with the North Yorkshire Fire and Rescue Service to attend large scale flooding events and water rescues.

Whilst the SMRT cover over up to 600 square miles (1,600 km^{2}), they do not confine themselves solely to Swaledale, Wensleydale or even North Yorkshire. The SMRT have operated in York, Cumbria, and Whitby. As with most volunteer search and rescue teams, the SMRT does not receive any local, regional or national funding. It relies solely on the support of local people and organisations.

During 2009, SMRT were involved in 30 callouts and 35 in 2010. Previous numbers had been in the high teens and low twenties; the rise in number of callouts was attributed to people Staycationing after the 2008 financial crisis. During 2016, the team were called out fifteen times to a variety of rescues including one where a Tesco delivery driver had driven off a small cliff near Leyburn in North Yorkshire. During 2020, despite fewer people visiting the area due to the lockdowns enforced by the COVID-19 pandemic, the team were called out 35 times during 2020.

The SMRT work from a building located on the Catterick Garrison estate. The British Army used to charge the SMRT for use of their training land, but after the SMRT were called out to search for missing soldiers (one of whom had drowned), the army agreed to drop their levy to a peppercorn rent of just £5 per year.

== Role ==
The SMRT are used on the usual range of rescue and search operations. Notable examples of their involvement include;

- The rescue of military personnel after a Puma helicopter from the Royal Air Force crashed near to Catterick Garrison (2007)
- The search for Claudia Lawrence (March 2009)
- The Workington/Cockermouth floods (2009)
- The delivery of urgent medical supplies to remote areas of North Yorkshire cut off for over a month during the bad winter of 2010 (Kexwith, Helwith & Newsham)
- The Tour de France in Yorkshire (2014)
- The collapse of Tadcaster Bridge (2015)
- The evacuation of families from flooded homes in Carlisle as a result of Storm Desmond (2015)
- The North Sea Tidal Surge [Storm Axel] (January 2017)
- The 2019 Yorkshire Dales flooding

The SMRT have a sub-team known as the Swiftwater and Flood Rescue Unit (SWFRU) which responds to water-based incidents such as missing kayakers, people who are trapped in vehicles with floodwater rising around them and stricken cattle stuck in watercourses. The unit was formed in 2003.

Whilst the traditional role on a Mountain Rescue Team is of rescuing people and cattle, SMRT have been called in by the Yorkshire Dales National Park Authority to help remove dumped rubbish. In 1999 the SMRT were asked to help out at the Buttertubs Pass as detritus such as a tractor wheel and a telegraph pole had been dumped down the holes on the pass. As the park rangers lacked the specialist equipment needed to access the pot-holes, SMRT were called in.

== Affiliations ==
SMRT is affiliated to the North East Search and Rescue Association, Mountain Rescue (England and Wales), and the British Cave Rescue Council.

== See also ==
- Mountain rescue in England and Wales
