= List of United Kingdom locations: Wam-Way =

The United Kingdom

This is part of the list of United Kingdom locations: a gazetteer of place names in the United Kingdom showing each place's locality and geographical coordinates.

== Wam–Was ==
Location	Locality	Coordinates (links to map & photo sources)	OS grid reference
Wambrook	Somerset	50.85°N 03.01°W	ST2907
Wampool	Cumbria	54.87°N 03.18°W	NY2454
Wanborough	Surrey	51.22°N 00.66°W	SU9348
Wanborough	Swindon	51.53°N 01.71°W	SU2082
Wandel Dyke	South Lanarkshire	55.51°N 03.66°W	NS9526
Wandle Park	Croydon	51.36°N 00.11°W	TQ3165
Wandon End	Luton	51.88°N 00.35°W	TL1322
Wandsworth		51.46°N 00.20°W	TQ2575
Wangford	Suffolk	52.35°N 01.61°E	TM4679
Wanlip	Leicestershire	52.68°N 01.11°W	SK6010
Wanlockhead	Dumfries and Galloway	55.38°N 03.78°W	NS8712
Wannock	East Sussex	50.80°N 00.22°E	TQ5703
Wansford	Cambridgeshire	52.57°N 00.42°W	TL0799
Wansford	East Riding of Yorkshire	53.98°N 00.38°W	TA0656
Wanshurst Green	Kent	51.17°N 00.51°E	TQ7645
Wanson	Cornwall	50.77°N 04.56°W	SS1900
Wanstead	Redbridge	51.57°N 00.01°E	TQ4088
Wanstrow	Somerset	51.16°N 02.41°W	ST7141
Wansunt	Bexley	51.447°N 00.176°E	TQ513743
Wanswell	Gloucestershire	51.70°N 02.46°W	SO6801
Wantage	Oxfordshire	51.58°N 01.42°W	SU4087
Wants Green	Herefordshire	52.21°N 02.35°W	SO7657
Wapley	South Gloucestershire	51.50°N 02.41°W	ST7179
Waplington	East Riding of Yorkshire	53.91°N 00.82°W	SE7746
Wappenbury	Warwickshire	52.31°N 01.45°W	SP3769
Wappenham	Northamptonshire	52.10°N 01.09°W	SP6245
Wapping	Southwark	51.50°N 00.07°W	TQ3480
Warbleton	East Sussex	50.93°N 00.27°E	TQ6018
Warblington	Hampshire	50.84°N 00.97°W	SU7206
Warborough	Oxfordshire	51.63°N 01.14°W	SU5993
Warboys	Cambridgeshire	52.40°N 00.09°W	TL3080
Warbreck (Blackpool)	Lancashire	53.83°N 03.03°W	SD3238
Warbstow	Cornwall	50.68°N 04.54°W	SX2090
Warbstow Cross	Cornwall	50.68°N 04.54°W	SX2090
Warburton	Trafford	53.39°N 02.46°W	SJ6989
Warburton Green	Trafford	53.35°N 02.31°W	SJ7984
Warcop	Cumbria	54.53°N 02.40°W	NY7415
Warden	Powys	52.26°N 03.02°W	SO3064
Warden	Kent	51.40°N 00.90°E	TR0271
Warden	Northumberland	54.98°N 02.14°W	NY9166
Ward End	Birmingham	52.49°N 01.83°W	SP1188
Warden Hill	Gloucestershire	51.87°N 02.10°W	SO9320
Warden Law	City of Sunderland	54.843°N 01.428°W	NZ3750
Warden Point	Isle of Wight	50.68°N 01.54°W	SZ3287
Warden Street	Bedfordshire	52.08°N 00.36°W	TL1244
Ward Green	Suffolk	52.22°N 00.98°E	TM0463
Ward Green	Barnsley	53.53°N 01.48°W	SE3404
Ward Green Cross	Lancashire	53.82°N 02.56°W	SD6337
Wardhedges	Bedfordshire	52.00°N 00.45°W	TL0635
Wardhill	Orkney Islands	59.11°N 02.61°W	HY6525
Wardington	Oxfordshire	52.11°N 01.28°W	SP4946
Wardlaw	Scottish Borders	55.43°N 03.12°W	NT2916
Wardle	Rochdale	53.64°N 02.13°W	SD9116
Wardle	Cheshire	53.10°N 02.58°W	SJ6157
Wardle Bank	Cheshire	53.11°N 02.58°W	SJ6158
Wardley	West Sussex	51.03°N 00.80°W	SU8427
Wardley	Gateshead	54.94°N 01.54°W	NZ2961
Wardley	Salford	53.51°N 02.36°W	SD7602
Wardley	Rutland	52.59°N 00.77°W	SK8300
Wardlow	Derbyshire	53.26°N 01.73°W	SK1874
Wardour	Wiltshire	51.04°N 02.11°W	ST9227
Wardpark	North Lanarkshire	55.97°N 03.97°W	NS7777
Wardrobes	Buckinghamshire	51.70°N 00.82°W	SP8101
Wardsend	Cheshire	53.33°N 02.12°W	SJ9282
Wardy Hill	Cambridgeshire	52.41°N 00.16°E	TL4782
Ware	Devon	50.71°N 02.96°W	SY3291
Ware	Hertfordshire	51.80°N 00.02°W	TL3614
Ware	Kent	51.29°N 01.25°E	TR2760
Warehorne	Kent	51.05°N 00.82°E	TQ9832
Warenford	Northumberland	55.54°N 01.79°W	NU1328
Waren Mill	Northumberland	55.60°N 01.77°W	NU1434
Wareside	Hertfordshire	51.81°N 00.01°E	TL3915
Waresley	Cambridgeshire	52.17°N 00.17°W	TL2554
Waresley	Worcestershire	52.32°N 02.23°W	SO8470
Ware Street	Kent	51.27°N 00.56°E	TQ7956
Warfield	Berkshire	51.44°N 00.74°W	SU8772
Warfleet	Devon	50.33°N 03.58°W	SX8750
Wargate	Lincolnshire	52.85°N 00.17°W	TF2330
Wargrave	Berkshire	51.49°N 00.87°W	SU7878
Wargrave	Cheshire	53.44°N 02.63°W	SJ5894
Warham	Herefordshire	52.04°N 02.75°W	SO4839
Warham	Norfolk	52.93°N 00.88°E	TF9441
Warhill	Tameside	53.45°N 02.01°W	SJ9995
Warings Green	Warwickshire	52.36°N 01.82°W	SP1274
Wark on Tweed	Northumberland	55.63°N 02.28°W	NT8238
Wark on Tyne	Northumberland	55.08°N 02.22°W	NY8677
Wark Common	Northumberland	55.61°N 02.28°W	NT8236
Warkleigh	Devon	50.98°N 03.93°W	SS6422
Warkton	Northamptonshire	52.40°N 00.69°W	SP8979
Warkworth	Northamptonshire	52.05°N 01.30°W	SP4840
Warkworth	Northumberland	55.34°N 01.62°W	NU2406
Warlaby	North Yorkshire	54.31°N 01.47°W	SE3491
Warland	Calderdale	53.67°N 02.09°W	SD9420
Warleggan	Cornwall	50.49°N 04.60°W	SX1569
Warleigh	Bath and North East Somerset	51.37°N 02.30°W	ST7964
Warley	Essex	51.60°N 00.29°E	TQ5992
Warley Town	Calderdale	53.72°N 01.92°W	SE0525
Warley Woods	Sandwell	52.47°N 01.98°W	SP0186
Warlingham	Surrey	51.30°N 00.06°W	TQ3558
Warmbrook	Derbyshire	53.07°N 01.58°W	SK2853
Warmfield	Wakefield	53.67°N 01.44°W	SE3720
Warmingham	Cheshire	53.14°N 02.45°W	SJ7061
Warminghurst	West Sussex	50.93°N 00.42°W	TQ1116
Warmington	Northamptonshire	52.50°N 00.42°W	TL0791
Warmington	Warwickshire	52.12°N 01.40°W	SP4147
Warminster	Wiltshire	51.20°N 02.18°W	ST8745
Warminster Common	Wiltshire	51.19°N 02.20°W	ST8644
Warmlake	Kent	51.21°N 00.59°E	TQ8149
Warmley	South Gloucestershire	51.45°N 02.47°W	ST6773
Warmley Hill	South Gloucestershire	51.45°N 02.50°W	ST6573
Warmley Tower	South Gloucestershire	51.44°N 02.49°W	ST6672
Warmonds Hill	Northamptonshire	52.30°N 00.60°W	SP9568
Warmsworth	Doncaster	53.49°N 01.18°W	SE5400
Warmwell	Dorset	50.66°N 02.35°W	SY7585
Warnborough Green	Hampshire	51.26°N 00.96°W	SU7252
Warndon	Worcestershire	52.20°N 02.17°W	SO8856
Warners End	Hertfordshire	51.75°N 00.50°W	TL0307
Warnford	Hampshire	51.00°N 01.11°W	SU6223
Warnham	West Sussex	51.08°N 00.35°W	TQ1533
Warningcamp	West Sussex	50.85°N 00.53°W	TQ0307
Warninglid	West Sussex	51.01°N 00.21°W	TQ2526
Warpsgrove	Oxfordshire	51.67°N 01.07°W	SU6498
Warren	Dorset	50.71°N 02.21°W	SY8591
Warren	Pembrokeshire	51.63°N 04.99°W	SR9397
Warren	Sheffield	53.46°N 01.47°W	SK3597
Warren	Cheshire	53.22°N 02.18°W	SJ8870
Warrenby	Redcar and Cleveland	54.61°N 01.10°W	NZ5825
Warren Corner (Froxfield and Privett)	Hampshire	51.03°N 00.97°W	SU7227
Warren Corner (Ewshot)	Hampshire	51.23°N 00.84°W	SU8149
Warren Heath	Suffolk	52.03°N 01.20°E	TM2042
Warren Row	Berkshire	51.51°N 00.83°W	SU8180
Warren's Green	Hertfordshire	51.93°N 00.16°W	TL2628
Warren Street	Kent	51.24°N 00.74°E	TQ9253
Warrington	Milton Keynes	52.17°N 00.69°W	SP8954
Warrington	Cheshire	53.38°N 02.60°W	SJ6088
Warriston	City of Edinburgh	55.96°N 03.20°W	NT2575
Warsash	Hampshire	50.85°N 01.30°W	SU4906
Warse	Highland	58.63°N 03.15°W	ND3372
Warsill	North Yorkshire	54.08°N 01.66°W	SE2265
Warslow	Staffordshire	53.11°N 01.88°W	SK0858
Warsop Vale	Nottinghamshire	53.19°N 01.19°W	SK5467
Warstock	Birmingham	52.40°N 01.86°W	SP0979
Warstone	Staffordshire	52.64°N 02.04°W	SJ9705
Warter	East Riding of Yorkshire	53.93°N 00.69°W	SE8650
Warthermarske	North Yorkshire	54.19°N 01.69°W	SE2078
Warthill	North Yorkshire	53.98°N 00.97°W	SE6755
Wartling	East Sussex	50.85°N 00.34°E	TQ6509
Wartnaby	Leicestershire	52.80°N 00.94°W	SK7123
Warton (Fylde)	Lancashire	53.74°N 02.89°W	SD4128
Warton (Lancaster)	Lancashire	54.14°N 02.76°W	SD5072
Warton	Northumberland	55.31°N 02.00°W	NU0002
Warton	Warwickshire	52.62°N 01.58°W	SK2803
Warton Bank	Lancashire	53.73°N 02.91°W	SD4027
Warwick	Warwickshire	52.28°N 01.59°W	SP2865
Warwick Bridge	Cumbria	54.89°N 02.82°W	NY4756
Warwick-on-Eden	Cumbria	54.89°N 02.84°W	NY4656
Warwicksland	Cumbria	55.08°N 02.87°W	NY4477
Warwick Wold	Surrey	51.25°N 00.12°W	TQ3152
Wasbister	Orkney Islands	59.17°N 03.06°W	HY3932
Wasdale Head	Cumbria	54.46°N 03.26°W	NY1808
Wash	Derbyshire	53.33°N 01.91°W	SK0682
Washall Green	Hertfordshire	51.95°N 00.09°E	TL4430
Washaway	Cornwall	50.48°N 04.77°W	SX0369
Washbourne	Devon	50.37°N 03.70°W	SX7954
Washbrook	Somerset	51.24°N 02.83°W	ST4250
Washbrook	Suffolk	52.03°N 01.07°E	TM1142
Washbrook Street	Suffolk	52.03°N 01.07°E	TM1142
Wash Common	Berkshire	51.37°N 01.35°W	SU4564
Wash Dyke	Norfolk	52.72°N 00.21°E	TF5016
Washerwall	Staffordshire	53.02°N 02.10°W	SJ9347
Washfield	Devon	50.92°N 03.52°W	SS9315
Washfold	North Yorkshire	54.41°N 01.92°W	NZ0502
Washford	Somerset	51.16°N 03.37°W	ST0441
Washford	Worcestershire	52.28°N 01.89°W	SP0765
Washford Pyne	Devon	50.88°N 03.69°W	SS8111
Washingborough	Lincolnshire	53.21°N 00.47°W	TF0270
Washingley	Cambridgeshire	52.48°N 00.33°W	TL1389
Washington	West Sussex	50.89°N 00.40°W	TQ1212
Washington	Sunderland	54.90°N 01.51°W	NZ3157
Washington Village	Sunderland	54.89°N 01.53°W	NZ3056
Washmere Green	Suffolk	52.08°N 00.78°E	TL9147
Washpit	Kirklees	53.55°N 01.79°W	SE1406
Wash Water	West Berkshire	51.36°N 01.35°W	SU4563
Washwood Heath	Birmingham	52.49°N 01.85°W	SP1088
Wasing	Berkshire	51.37°N 01.18°W	SU5764
Waskerley	Durham	54.80°N 01.92°W	NZ0545
Wasperton	Warwickshire	52.21°N 01.62°W	SP2658
Wasp Green	Surrey	51.18°N 00.11°W	TQ3245
Wasps Nest	Lincolnshire	53.16°N 00.38°W	TF0864
Wass	North Yorkshire	54.20°N 01.15°W	SE5579
Wassand	East Riding of Yorkshire	53.90°N 00.21°W	TA1746
Waste Green	Warwickshire	52.31°N 01.64°W	SP2469
Wastor	Devon	50.32°N 03.91°W	SX6449

== Wat–Waz ==
Location	Locality	Coordinates (links to map & photo sources)	OS grid reference
Watchcombe	Devon	50.76°N 03.09°W	SY2397
Watchet	Somerset	51.17°N 03.33°W	ST0743
Watchfield	Somerset	51.21°N 02.94°W	ST3447
Watchfield	Oxfordshire	51.60°N 01.65°W	SU2490
Watchgate	Cumbria	54.38°N 02.74°W	SD5299
Watchhill	Cumbria	54.76°N 03.27°W	NY1842
Watch House Green	Essex	51.86°N 00.45°E	TL6921
Watchill	Dumfries and Galloway	54.98°N 03.25°W	NY2066
Watcombe	Devon	50.49°N 03.53°W	SX9167
Watendlath	Cumbria	54.53°N 03.12°W	NY2716
Water	Devon	50.60°N 03.76°W	SX7580
Water	Lancashire	53.72°N 02.24°W	SD8425
Waterbeach	West Sussex	50.86°N 00.73°W	SU8908
Waterbeach	Cambridgeshire	52.26°N 00.18°E	TL4965
Waterbeck	Dumfries and Galloway	55.08°N 03.19°W	NY2477
Waterdale	Hertfordshire	51.70°N 00.39°W	TL1102
Waterditch	Hampshire	50.76°N 01.74°W	SZ1896
Water Eaton	Milton Keynes	51.97°N 00.73°W	SP8732
Water Eaton	Oxfordshire	51.80°N 01.26°W	SP5112
Water End (Wrestlingworth)	Bedfordshire	52.10°N 00.17°W	TL2547
Water End	Essex	52.03°N 00.30°E	TL5840
Water End (Bedford)	Bedfordshire	52.11°N 00.39°W	TL1047
Water End (Maulden)	Bedfordshire	52.02°N 00.45°W	TL0637
Waterend	Gloucestershire	51.82°N 02.36°W	SO7514
Water End (Dacorum)	Hertfordshire	51.77°N 00.50°W	TL0310
Waterend	Hertfordshire	51.80°N 00.26°W	TL2013
Waterend	Buckinghamshire	51.65°N 00.87°W	SU7896
Water End (Welwyn Hatfield)	Hertfordshire	51.72°N 00.23°W	TL2204
Water End	Hampshire	51.27°N 01.01°W	SU6953
Waterend	Cumbria	54.58°N 03.37°W	NY1122
Water End	East Riding of Yorkshire	53.83°N 00.81°W	SE7838
Waterfall	Staffordshire	53.05°N 01.88°W	SK0851
Waterfoot	Argyll and Bute	55.57°N 05.49°W	NR8037
Waterfoot	Cumbria	54.60°N 02.85°W	NY4524
Waterfoot	Lancashire	53.68°N 02.25°W	SD8321
Waterfoot	East Renfrewshire	55.75°N 04.29°W	NS5654
Waterford	Hampshire	50.74°N 01.53°W	SZ3394
Waterford	Hertfordshire	51.80°N 00.10°W	TL3114
Water Fryston	Wakefield	53.72°N 01.30°W	SE4626
Water Garth Nook	Cumbria	54.09°N 03.25°W	SD1867
Watergate (Advent)	Cornwall	50.59°N 04.67°W	SX1181
Watergate (Pelynt)	Cornwall	50.35°N 04.49°W	SX2354
Watergore	Somerset	50.93°N 02.81°W	ST4315
Waterhales	Essex	51.63°N 00.20°E	TQ5395
Waterham	Kent	51.31°N 00.96°E	TR0762
Waterhay	Wiltshire	51.63°N 01.91°W	SU0693
Waterhead	Devon	50.30°N 03.85°W	SX6847
Waterhead	Cumbria	54.41°N 02.97°W	NY3703
Waterheads	Scottish Borders	55.73°N 03.21°W	NT2450
Waterheath	Norfolk	52.48°N 01.59°E	TM4494
Waterhouses	Durham	54.76°N 01.72°W	NZ1841
Water Houses	North Yorkshire	54.09°N 02.18°W	SD8867
Waterhouses	Staffordshire	53.04°N 01.88°W	SK0850
Wateringbury	Kent	51.25°N 00.42°E	TQ6953
Waterlane	Gloucestershire	51.73°N 02.11°W	SO9204
Waterlip	Somerset	51.19°N 02.48°W	ST6644
Waterloo	Cornwall	50.51°N 04.68°W	SX1072
Waterloo	Derbyshire	53.16°N 01.38°W	SK4163
Waterloo	Highland	57.23°N 05.87°W	NG6623
Waterloo	Lancashire	53.72°N 02.51°W	SD6625
Waterloo (Scole)	Norfolk	52.36°N 01.14°E	TM1479
Waterloo (Gillingham)	Norfolk	52.48°N 01.56°E	TM4293
Waterloo (Hainford)	Norfolk	52.72°N 01.28°E	TG2219
Waterloo	North Lanarkshire	55.75°N 03.91°W	NS8053
Waterloo	Pembrokeshire	51.68°N 04.93°W	SM9703
Waterloo	Perth and Kinross	56.50°N 03.54°W	NO0536
Waterloo	Poole	50.74°N 01.98°W	SZ0194
Waterloo	Sefton	53.47°N 03.04°W	SJ3198
Waterloo	Shropshire	52.89°N 02.75°W	SJ4933
Waterloo	Tameside	53.49°N 02.10°W	SD9300
Waterloo Park	Sefton	53.47°N 03.02°W	SJ3298
Waterloo Port	Gwynedd	53.15°N 04.27°W	SH4864
Waterlooville	Hampshire	50.87°N 01.03°W	SU6809
Waterman Quarter	Kent	51.14°N 00.61°E	TQ8342
Watermead	Gloucestershire	51.83°N 02.16°W	SO8915
Watermill	East Sussex	50.87°N 00.45°E	TQ7311
Watermillock	Cumbria	54.59°N 02.86°W	NY4422
Watermoor	Gloucestershire	51.70°N 01.97°W	SP0201
Water Newton	Cambridgeshire	52.56°N 00.37°W	TL1097
Water Orton	Warwickshire	52.51°N 01.75°W	SP1791
Waterperry	Oxfordshire	51.74°N 01.10°W	SP6206
Waterrow	Somerset	51.01°N 03.35°W	ST0525
Watersfield	West Sussex	50.92°N 00.56°W	TQ0115
Watersheddings	Oldham	53.55°N 02.09°W	SD9406
Waterside	Buckinghamshire	51.69°N 00.61°W	SP9600
Waterside	Cumbria	54.79°N 03.21°W	NY2245
Waterside	Derbyshire	53.34°N 01.98°W	SK0183
Waterside	Doncaster	53.60°N 00.98°W	SE6713
Waterside	Lancashire	53.70°N 02.44°W	SD7123
Waterside	Shropshire	52.76°N 02.56°W	SJ6219
Waterside	Surrey	51.18°N 00.01°W	TQ3945
Waterside (River Doon)	East Ayrshire	55.34°N 04.47°W	NS4308
Waterside (Craufurdland Water)	East Ayrshire	55.65°N 04.41°W	NS4843
Waterside	East Dunbartonshire	55.93°N 04.13°W	NS6773
Waterside	East Renfrewshire	55.81°N 04.37°W	NS5160
Waterslack	Lancashire	54.17°N 02.81°W	SD4776
Water's Nook	Bolton	53.54°N 02.51°W	SD6605
Waterstein	Highland	57.43°N 06.76°W	NG1448
Waterstock	Oxfordshire	51.74°N 01.08°W	SP6305
Waterston	Pembrokeshire	51.70°N 04.99°W	SM9305
Water Stratford	Buckinghamshire	52.00°N 01.05°W	SP6534
Waters Upton	Shropshire	52.76°N 02.54°W	SJ6319
Waterthorpe	Sheffield	53.33°N 01.35°W	SK4382
Waterton	Aberdeenshire	57.36°N 02.05°W	NJ9730
Waterton	Bridgend	51.49°N 03.54°W	SS9378
Waterton	Lincolnshire	53.65°N 00.71°W	SE8518
Water Yeat	Cumbria	54.29°N 03.10°W	SD2889
Watford	Hertfordshire	51.66°N 00.41°W	TQ1097
Watford	Northamptonshire	52.30°N 01.12°W	SP6068
Watford Gap	Birmingham	52.59°N 01.83°W	SK1100
Watford Heath	Hertfordshire	51.63°N 00.38°W	TQ1294
Watford Park	Caerphilly	51.56°N 03.24°W	ST1486
Wath	Cumbria	54.43°N 02.49°W	NY6805
Wath (near Ripon)	North Yorkshire	54.18°N 01.51°W	SE3277
Wath (Ryedale)	North Yorkshire	54.16°N 00.97°W	SE6775
Wath (Nidderdale)	North Yorkshire	54.09°N 01.78°W	SE1467
Wath Brow	Cumbria	54.51°N 03.51°W	NY0214
Watherston	Scottish Borders	55.70°N 02.90°W	NT4346
Wath upon Dearne	Rotherham	53.49°N 01.35°W	SE4300
Watledge	Gloucestershire	51.69°N 02.23°W	SO8400
Watley's End	South Gloucestershire	51.52°N 02.50°W	ST6581
Watlington	Oxfordshire	51.64°N 01.01°W	SU6894
Watlington	Norfolk	52.66°N 00.37°E	TF6110
Watnall	Nottinghamshire	53.00°N 01.25°W	SK5045
Wats Ness	Shetland Islands	60.23°N 01.69°W	HU172502
Watten	Highland	58.46°N 03.32°W	ND2354
Wattisfield	Suffolk	52.32°N 00.94°E	TM0174
Wattisham	Suffolk	52.12°N 00.93°E	TM0151
Wattisham Stone	Suffolk	52.12°N 00.92°E	TM0051
Wattlefield	Norfolk	52.52°N 01.10°E	TM1196
Wattlesborough Heath	Shropshire	52.69°N 02.96°W	SJ3511
Watton	Dorset	50.72°N 02.77°W	SY4591
Watton	East Riding of Yorkshire	53.93°N 00.46°W	TA0150
Watton	Norfolk	52.56°N 00.81°E	TF9100
Watton-at-Stone	Hertfordshire	51.85°N 00.12°W	TL2919
Watton Green	Norfolk	52.57°N 00.83°E	TF9201
Watton's Green	Essex	51.63°N 00.19°E	TQ5295
Wattston	North Lanarkshire	55.90°N 03.96°W	NS7770
Wattstown	Rhondda, Cynon, Taff	51.62°N 03.43°W	ST0193
Wattsville	Caerphilly	51.61°N 03.15°W	ST2091
Wauldby	East Riding of Yorkshire	53.76°N 00.51°W	SE9729
Waulkmill	Dumfries and Galloway	54.79°N 04.44°W	NX4347
Waulkmill	Angus	56.63°N 02.60°W	NO6349
Waulkmill	Perth and Kinross	56.43°N 03.46°W	NO1028
Waulkmills	Angus	56.58°N 02.60°W	NO6344
Waun	Gwynedd	53.15°N 04.17°W	SH5564
Waunarlwydd	Swansea	51.63°N 04.02°W	SS6095
Waun Beddau	Pembrokeshire	51.91°N 05.24°W	SM7729
Waun Fawr	Ceredigion	52.40°N 04.05°W	SN6081
Waunfawr	Gwynedd	53.10°N 04.19°W	SH5359
Waungilwen	Carmarthenshire	52.02°N 04.42°W	SN3439
Waungron	Swansea	51.69°N 04.04°W	SN5902
Waun-Lwyd	Blaenau Gwent	51.74°N 03.20°W	SO1706
Waun y Clyn	Carmarthenshire	51.71°N 04.24°W	SN4504
Waun y Gilfach	Bridgend	51.57°N 03.67°W	SS8488
Wavendon	Milton Keynes	52.02°N 00.68°W	SP9037
Wavendon Gate	Milton Keynes	52.01°N 00.68°W	SP9036
Waverbridge	Cumbria	54.83°N 03.21°W	NY2249
Waverton	Cumbria	54.81°N 03.21°W	NY2247
Waverton	Cheshire	53.17°N 02.82°W	SJ4564
Wavertree	Liverpool	53.39°N 02.93°W	SJ3889
Wawcott	Berkshire	51.40°N 01.44°W	SU3968
Wawne	East Riding of Yorkshire	53.80°N 00.36°W	TA0836
Waxham	Norfolk	52.77°N 01.60°E	TG4326
Waxholme	East Riding of Yorkshire	53.74°N 00.00°E	TA3229
Way	Kent	51.33°N 01.32°E	TR3265
Waye	Devon	50.52°N 03.73°W	SX7771
Wayend Street	Herefordshire	52.02°N 02.38°W	SO7436
Wayfield	Kent	51.35°N 00.51°E	TQ7565
Wayford	Somerset	50.85°N 02.85°W	ST4006
Waymills	Shropshire	52.96°N 02.67°W	SJ5541
Wayne Green	Monmouthshire	51.85°N 02.85°W	SO4118
Way's Green	Cheshire	53.18°N 02.54°W	SJ6465
Waytown (Parkham)	Devon	50.97°N 04.33°W	SS3622
Waytown (Barnstaple)	Devon	51.07°N 04.04°W	SS5733
Waytown	Dorset	50.77°N 02.76°W	SY4697
Way Village	Devon	50.87°N 03.59°W	SS8810
Way Wick	North Somerset	51.35°N 02.89°W	ST3862
