= Warnborough =

Warnborough may refer to the following places in England:

- Warnborough College, Canterbury (previously in Oxford)
- Warnborough Green, Hampshire
- Warnborough Road, Oxford
- North Warnborough, Hampshire
- South Warnborough, Hampshire

== See also ==
- Wanborough (disambiguation)
