= Watton railway station =

Watton railway station may refer to:

- Watton railway station (England), a station of the Great Eastern Railway in Watton, Norfolk, England, from 1869–1965
- Watton railway station (Wales), a station of the Brecon and Merthyr Railway in Brecon, Powys, Wales, from 1863–1871

== See also ==
- Watten railway station
- Witton railway station
- Watton-at-Stone railway station
- Watton (disambiguation)
- Wotton railway station (disambiguation)
