= Coatham =

Area of Redcar in North Yorkshire, England

Coordinates: 54.61686°N 1.08448°W

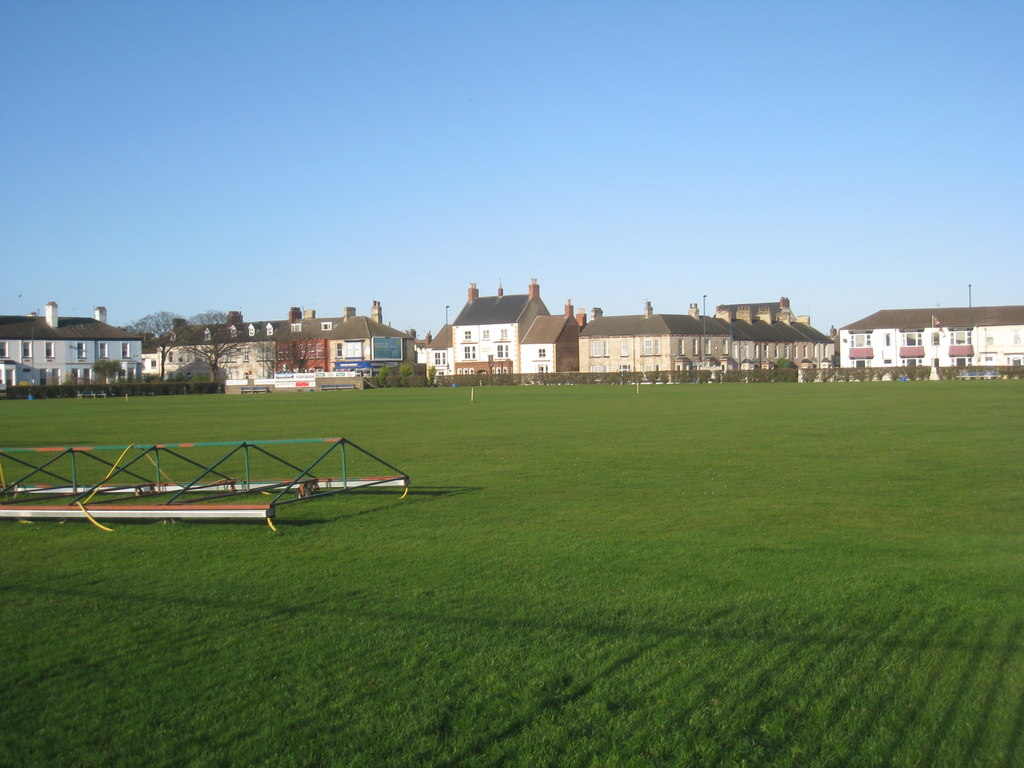
- Redcar Cricket Ground with Trafalgar Terrace and Coatham Road in the background

- Location within North Yorkshire
- Population: 5,326 (2011 census)
- OS grid reference: NZ592250
- Unitary authority: Redcar and Cleveland
- Ceremonial county: North Yorkshire
- Region: North East
- Country: England
- Sovereign state: United Kingdom
- Post town: REDCAR
- Postcode district: TS10
- Police: Cleveland
- Fire: Cleveland
- Ambulance: North East

Coatham is an area of Redcar, in the borough of Redcar and Cleveland and the ceremonial county of North Yorkshire, England.

== History ==
There is reputed to be an entry in Domesday Book – the first recorded reference to Coatham as "there is a Hamlet of Cotes (one-roomed cottages or shacks) on the beach where the people collect coal from boats from Hartlepool, to carry by pack animal to the Abbey at Guisborough for the heating for the monks there". Probably the people of the Hamlet of Cotes were taxed accordingly, and the place became known as "cote-ham" or similar? Coatham can be traced back to the 12th century, when "Roger son of William de Tocketts gave a salt-pan in 'Cotum' to Guisborough Priory." There was a significant port there, owned by the de Brus family in the 13th century. The weekly market of Kirkleatham parish was held in Coatham (possibly because of the presence of the port) and there was a three-day fair. These were chartered in 1257 by King Henry III.

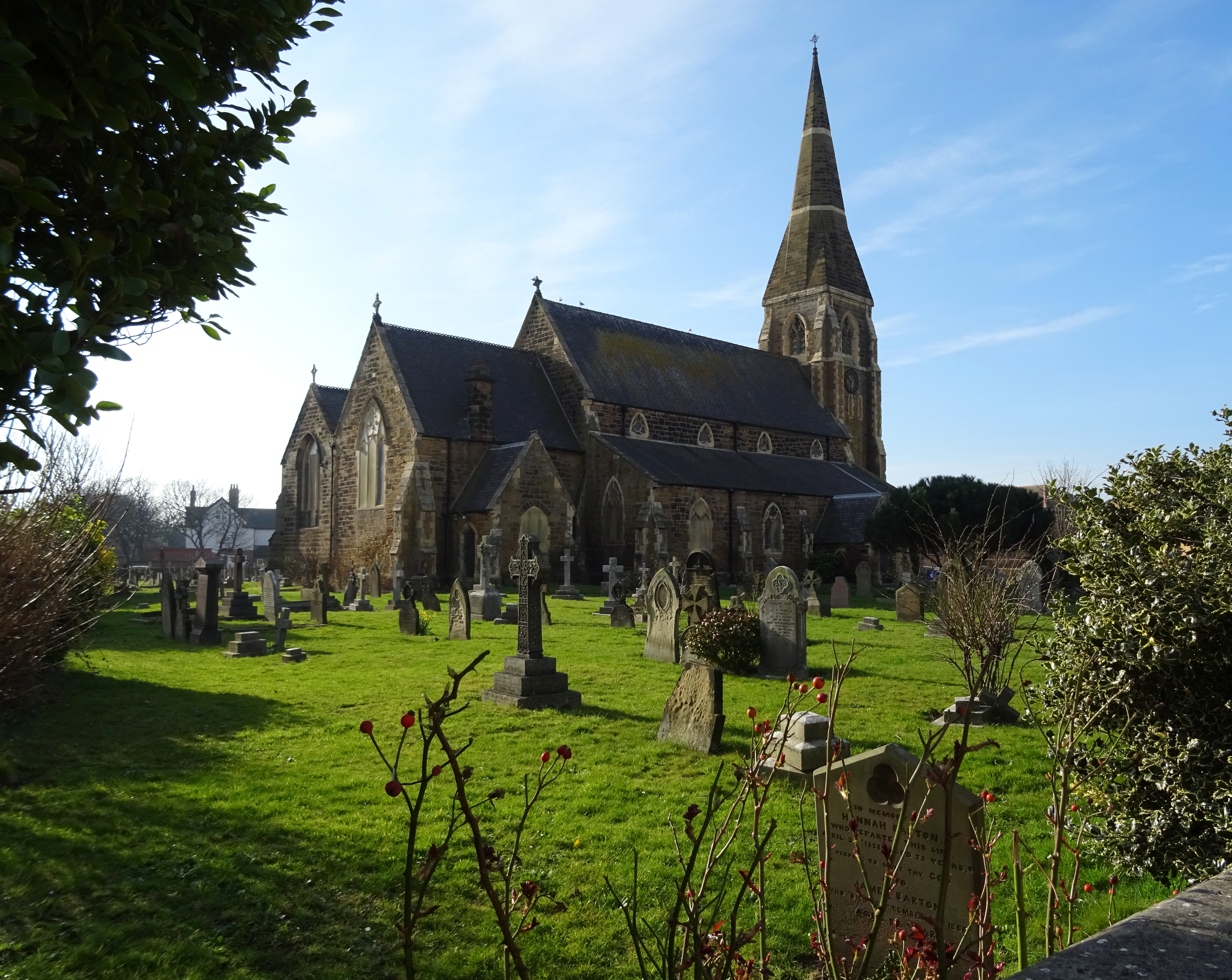
Christ Church, parish church of Coatham and Dormanstown

Though Coatham is now only a one-mile-wide (1.5-kilometre) district in the town of Redcar, the need for definition was strong enough to warrant the western boundary being marked by a fence which ran the length of West Dyke Road and West Terrace. Coatham comprises the remaining coastal land north of the railway line from West Dyke Road to Warrenby in the west. The present-day Redcar & Cleveland College was a grammar school before 1975 named Sir William Turner's.

Coatham was formerly a chapelry in the parish of Kirk-Leatham, on 1 April 1899 Coatham became a separate civil parish, on 1 April 1921 the parish was abolished and merged with Redcar. Until 1974 it was in the North Riding of Yorkshire. From 1974 to 1996 it was in the county of Cleveland.

=== Coatham Pier ===
Between 1875 and 1898, Coatham had a leisure pier. It was intended to extend 2,000 feet (600 metres) into the sea, but damage in the building stage from shipping and storms curtailed the distance to 1,800 ft (550 m). In October 1898, the pier was struck by the 757-tonne (834-short-ton) Finnish freighter Birger. The ship had developed trouble during a storm in the North Sea and despite passing Grimsby, Scarborough and Whitby, she carried on for South Shields. During a ferocious storm she crashed onto the rocks at Coatham and wrecked a 60-foot (18-metre) section of the pier in the middle, and only two members of her crew of 15 were rescued. The pier collapsed a year later.

== Demographics ==
In 1911 the parish had a population of 4,744. In the 2011 Census the area had a population of 5,326.

== Landmarks ==
The majority of modern Coatham is Victorian housing, most notably at its northern tip by the Coatham Hotel built in 1860. A small boating lake, leisure centre, arcade complex and caravan park now occupies the remainder of Coatham's coast. To the east, the Tees Valley Wildlife Trust's Coatham Marsh Nature Reserve hosts 54 hectares (130 acres) of ancient Marsh and grassland.

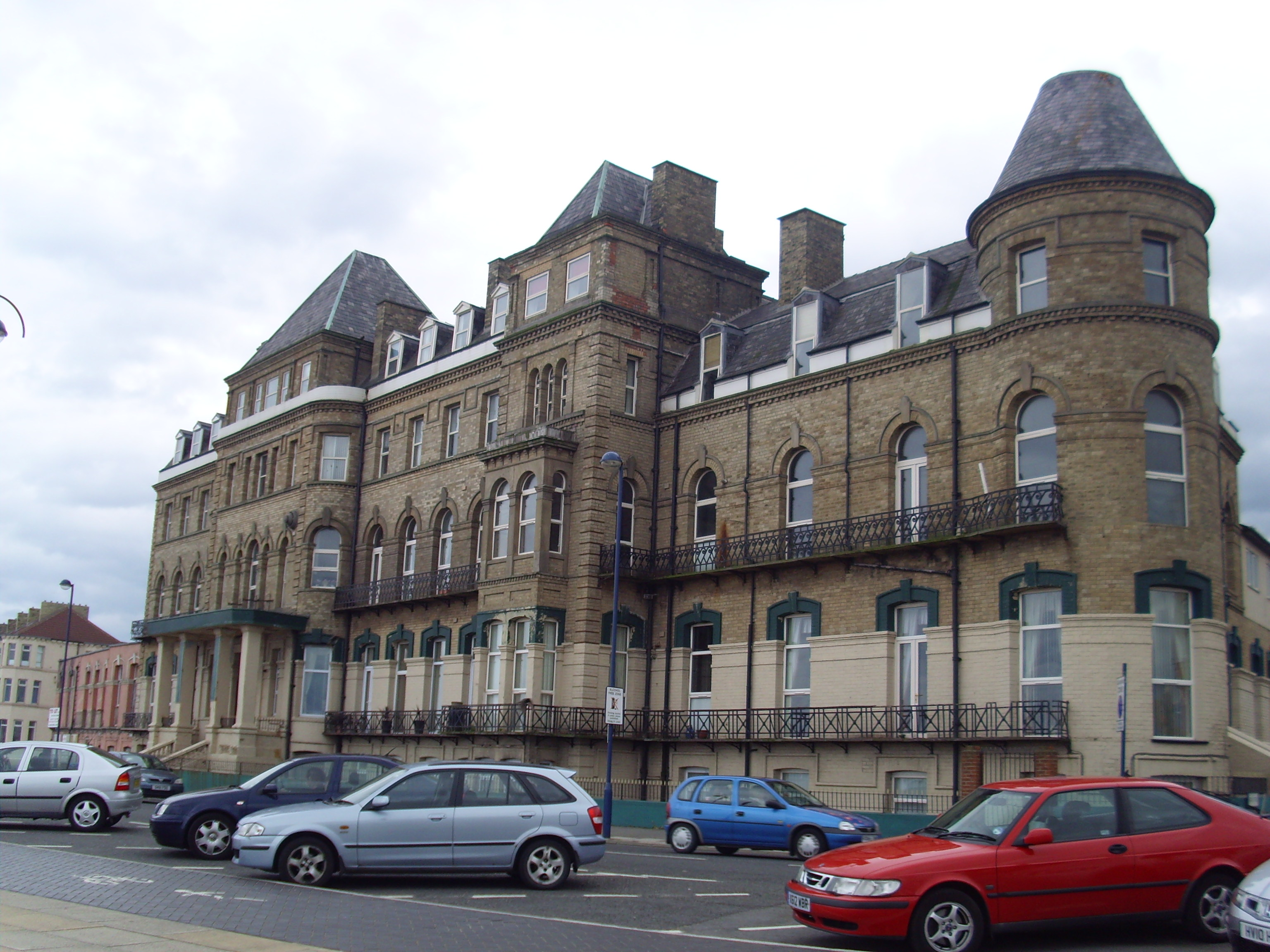
Coatham Hotel

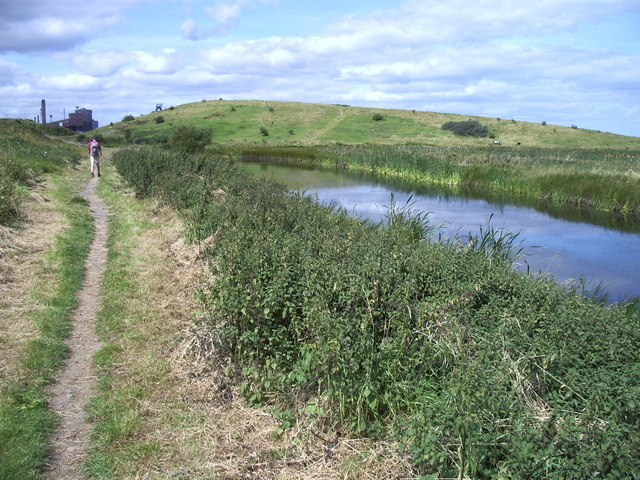
Coatham Marsh

== Future development ==
In the mid-1990s, political debate began amongst Coatham's five thousand residents as to the future of the last undeveloped section of Coatham's coastal land known as Coatham Common/Coatham Enclosure, having been used as a golf course and local recreation area.

Residents objected to losing open space to the council's proposed housing and leisure development planned to revive the tourist industry.

The Supreme Court of the United Kingdom announced on 3 March 2010 that Redcar Council must register the land as a village green.

== Notable residents ==
Coatham is the town where Jane Gardam, twice winner of the Whitbread Prize, was brought up and where some of her novels are set.
