= Watton =

Watton could refer to:

== Places ==
=== England ===
- Watton, Dorset, a UK location
- Watton, East Riding of Yorkshire, a village and civil parish
- Watton, Norfolk, a market town
- Watton-at-Stone, Hertfordshire, a village and civil parish
- RAF Watton, a former Royal Air Force station southwest of East Dereham, Norfolk

=== United States ===
- Watton, Michigan, an unincorporated community

== People with the surname ==
- Andrew Watton, a stage name of Steven Blum (born 1960), American voice actor
- Ben Watton (born 1995), English actor
- Chris Watton (born 1977), American football player
- Ellie Watton (born 1989), British field hockey player
- James Watton (1915–1995), Canadian Anglican bishop
- Jim Watton (born 1936), English footballer
- John Watton, Canadian Anglican bishop, Bishop of Central Newfoundland since 2016
- Jonathan Watton, Canadian actor
- Laura Watton (born 1979), British manga artist
- Ron Watton (born c. 1932), Canadian football player
- Russell Watton (born 1954), Northern Irish Ulster loyalist, politician and community activist

== Transportation ==
- Watton railway station (England), Watton, Norfolk
- Watton railway station (Wales), Brecon, Powys, Wales
- The Watton, a street in Brecon, Wales, the location of The Barracks, Brecon

== Other uses ==
- Watton United F.C., an English football club based in Watton, Norfolk

== See also ==
- Watton's Green, Essex, England
- Whatton-in-the-Vale
- Watten (disambiguation)
- Wotton (disambiguation)
