= Waterfoot =

Waterfoot is the name of several places etc. in the United Kingdom:

- Waterfoot, County Antrim, Northern Ireland, a village
- Waterfoot, Argyll and Bute, a location in Scotland
- Waterfoot, Cumbria, a location in England
- Waterfoot, East Renfrewshire, Scotland, a village
- Waterfoot, Lancashire, England, a town
  - Waterfoot railway station, serving the English town
