= Dormanstown =

Area near Redcar in North Yorkshire, England

Coordinates: 54.605°N 1.096°W

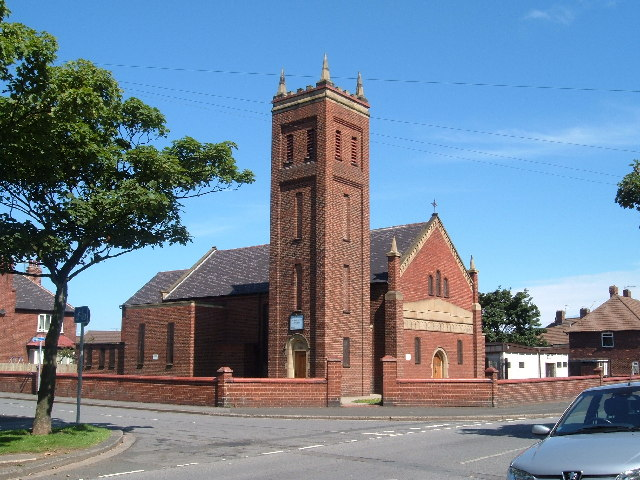
- The ARK Respite Care facility (formerly St William's church)

- Location within North Yorkshire
- Population: 6,755 (2011) (includes Wilton ward)
- OS grid reference: NZ584237
- Unitary authority: Redcar and Cleveland
- Ceremonial county: North Yorkshire
- Region: North East
- Country: England
- Sovereign state: United Kingdom
- Post town: REDCAR
- Postcode district: TS10
- Dialling code: 01642
- Police: Cleveland
- Fire: Cleveland
- Ambulance: North East
- UK Parliament: Redcar

Dormanstown is an area of Redcar in the borough of Redcar and Cleveland and the ceremonial county of North Yorkshire, England.

It was named after and built by the Dorman Long iron and steelworks in the 20th century. It was originally built to house Dorman's hundreds of steel workers and their families. The company built the Sydney Harbour Bridge and the steelworks was for some time considered the best in the world.

== History ==
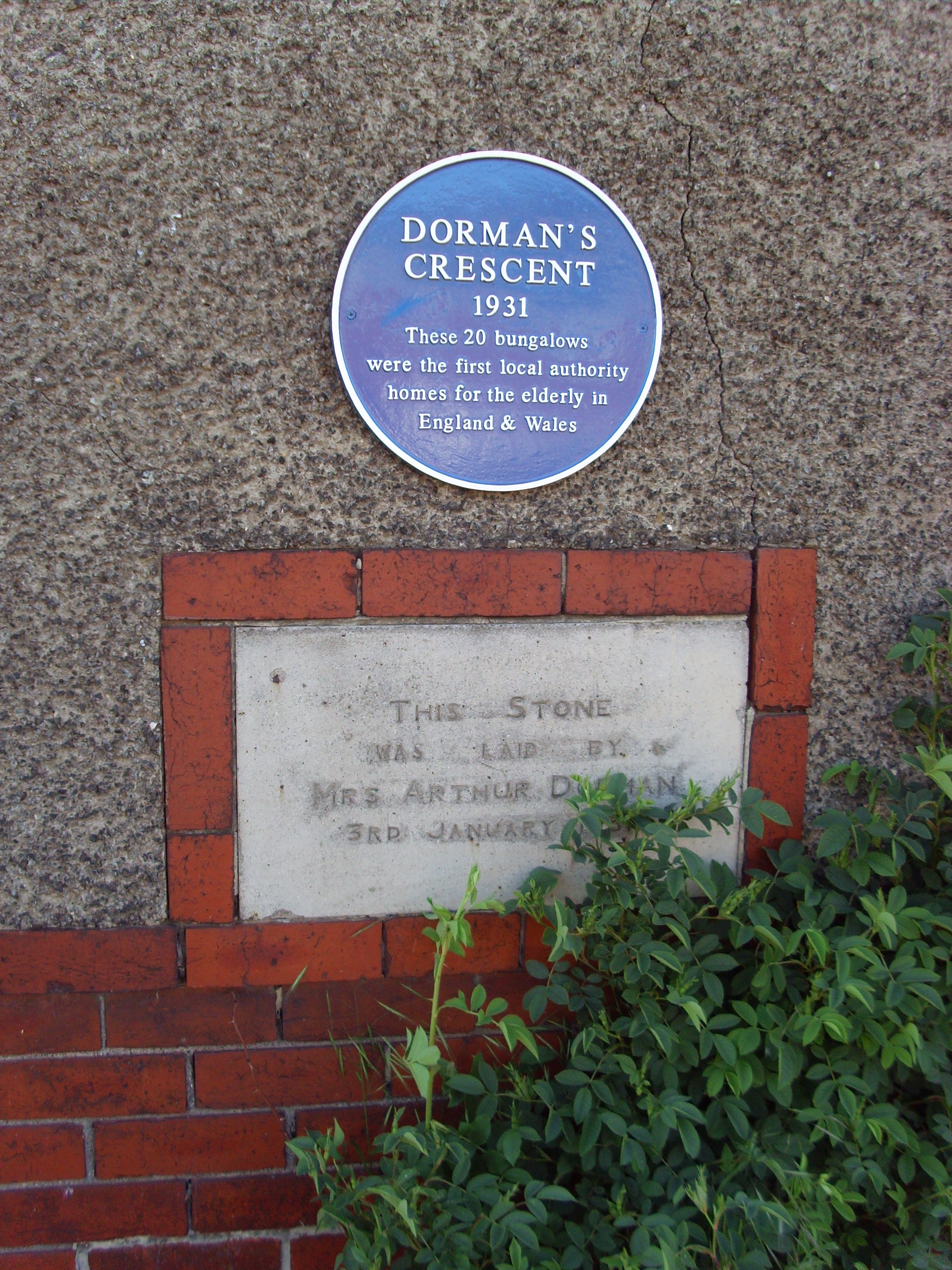
A plaque laid by Arthur Dorman's wife Clara Dorman

In 1917, building began to house the workmen of the Dorman Long iron and steelworks which was founded by Sir Arthur John Dorman. Previous to this the only house in Dormanstown was Westfield House. The first 300 houses built were designed by the architects Stanley Davenport Adshead (1868–1946), Stanley Ramsey (1882–1968), and Professor Patrick Abercrombie (1879–1957) and were designed and laid out as a Garden Village. A railway track was laid where Ennis Road now stands, and was used to bring materials from Dorman Long iron and steelworks to build the houses.

The building of Dormanstown Village was completed in 1920 and had enough housing for 342 families. Three of the streets were named after the architects (Adshead, Ramsey and Abercrombie). Dormanstown Village was built because of the increased amount of labour needed in Dorman Long iron and steelworks to manufacture munitions for the UK in World War I.

The first school in Dormanstown was a tiny green tin hut built on The Green. Dormanstown's first junior school (Clara Lady Dorman School) was opened in May 1926 by Lady Clara Dorman. The school catered for 400 pupils and at the opening ceremony a class of school children sang two songs which were Green Lanes of England and Jerusalem the Golden. The guests invited to the opening ceremony were so impressed by the class that they were invited to Councillor Lonsdale's café as a thank you for their performance.

In 1931, a set of four blocks of cottages were built for pensioners. The block of twenty cottages called Dormans Crescent are Grade II listed buildings, as they have the distinction of being the first homes in England to be constructed for local senior citizens. A plaque was made for this occasion and was laid onto a house in Dorman Crescent by Mrs Arthur Dorman on 3 January 1931.

Dormanstown had a cinema named The Majestic, but it was known locally as "The Bug and Flea". Admission cost sixpence for benches and seats cost ninepence. The Majestic was similar to a modern-day community centre, as it also catered for events other than cinema showings.

In 1935 All Saints' Anglican Church was built.

In 1938 building of St. William's Catholic Church, designed by architect F. Spink of Bridlington, started and was finished in 1939. St. William's Church was built for the large population of Catholics living in Dormanstown at that time. The church, which replaced an old army hut from Westfield Way, was built in the early Christian style. It is of red brick and stone and has a square tower and a Lady chapel; it has space for 450 people. When it was completed the new church dedicated to St William became a separate Parish. Its foundation stone was laid on 28 September 1938 by the Right Reverend Monsignor Canon R. Sullivan. On the church's 50th anniversary in 1989 it was consecrated by Bishop Harris. St William's church was closed in 2012, and the parish merged with Blessed Nicholas Postgate parish in Redcar town centre. The building was turned into a private respite care facility, which opened in 2023.

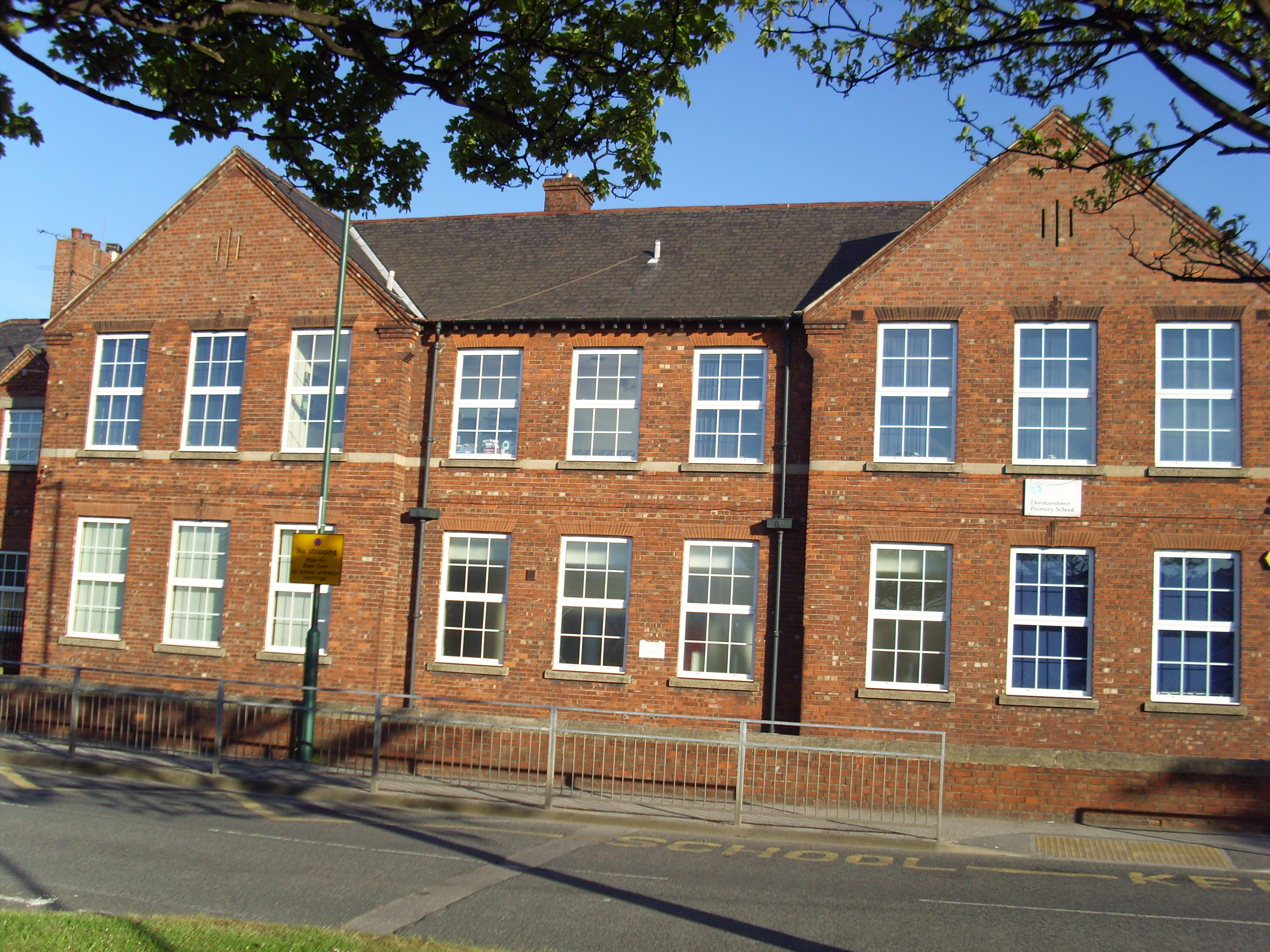
Dormanstown Primary School, formerly Lady Clara Dorman School

In 1935, the Methodist Chapel was built using money from public donations. It was a community centre for Dormanstown and was used for worship, boy scouts, girl guides, discos, meetings, raffles and as a place to go for a cup of tea and biscuits. It was demolished in 1997 as it was deemed to be unsafe.

On 17 December 1942, a returning Lancaster bomber was caught up in a raid and shot down in error by the Bofors gunners at Warrenby. The entire crew of seven were killed when the plane crashed near Middle Farm, Dormanstown.

In 1967, Dorman Long iron and steelworks became a part of British Steel Corporation BSC.

On Thursday 13 May 2004, a Sure Start Centre was opened on South Avenue by the Minister for Children, Margaret Hodge. The building was previously used as a National Health Service clinic. It is a playing and learning centre to be used by young children.

On 17 September 2007, planning permission was granted to Coast and Country Housing by Redcar and Cleveland Council to demolish parts of the small industrial estate located on the west side of Dormanstown; the houses to be demolished included 2–36 Hobson Avenue, 4-52/3-23 Howcroft Avenue and 10–16 Hutton Grove. These streets have now been demolished and cleared with only a small grass field in its place.

== Demographics ==
The area had (combined with the Wilton ward) had a population of 6,755 in the 2011 Census.

== The Dormanstown Delegates Jazz Band ==
The Dormanstown Delegates was a Juvenile jazz band which started c. 1976. Popular in the 1970s, Juvenile Jazz Bands were made up of children, and didn't play jazz – by any stretch of the imagination – but instead played popular marches using kazoos, drums, glockenspiels, marimbas, cymbals and xylophones. The children often practised on the local fields, such as the field behind All Saints Church on South Avenue. The Dormanstown Delegates travelled the country, in a blue and red, double decker bus, to perform their marches throughout the UK. In July 2005, a carnival was held in Dormanstown, at which the Dormanstown Delegates performed; the carnival was held on a field known locally as "the rec" short for (Dormanstown Recreation Ground), situated next to the road opposite Coatham Marsh.

== The Dorlonco Houses ==
Dorlonco houses are steel framed houses designed by Adshead, Ramsey and Abercrombie and built using steel produced by the Dorman Long iron and steelworks. They were neo-Georgian in style. The first of the Dorlonco houses were built in Dormanstown (1919) to house the Dorman Long Steelworkers and were demolished in the year 1979.

The sizing and placement of window and door openings satisfied the expectation of standardisation and simplification that had become an orthodoxy during the war years, and was also well suited to systemised building. Internal linings are very robust, consisting of a two-inch-thick (50-millimetre) leaf of clinkerblock work, plastered on the inner face, whilst intermediate floors are of concrete on metal lath reinforcement. As a result, the houses give the impression of being extremely solidly built. The steel frame was designed to accept a number of different claddings, from conventional brickwork to render on a metal lath.

== The Green ==
The Green named after the Egyptian Sun god Wadjet (the Green One) is a design created by Stanley Davenport Adshead who was renowned for his craftsmanship and the Baroque building style. The Green is a road layout which forms the shape of the Sun rising above the horizon. It is surrounded by eleven houses on its west side and eleven houses on its east side. Its horizon is represented as South Avenue and Maxwell Place represents the Sun at twelve mid-day. Consequently, each side of the Green is marked by two roads. On its east side there is a road named Broadway East and on its west side there is a road named Broadway West.

== Foxrush Farm Community Woodland ==
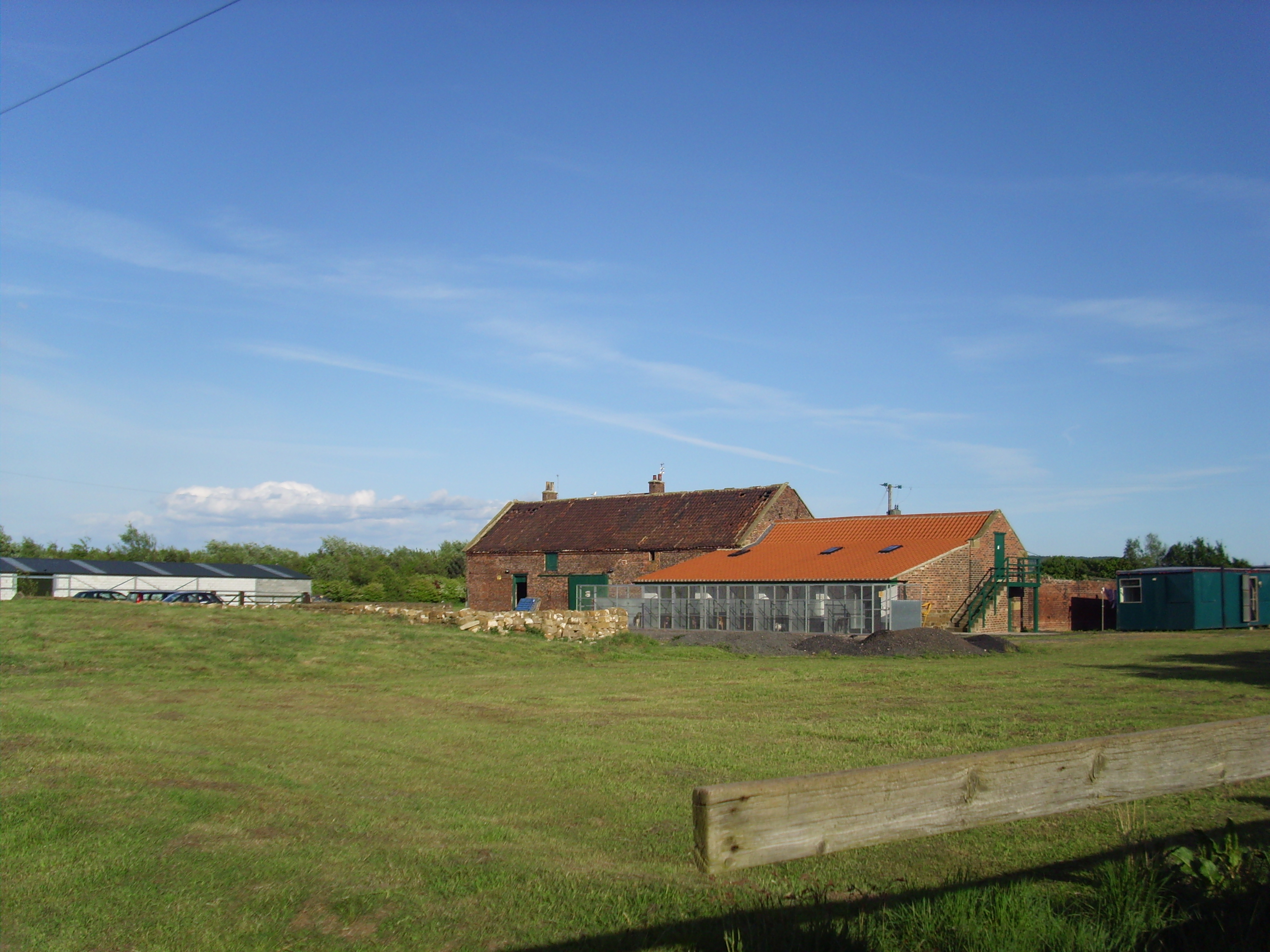
Foxrush Farm, Dormanstown

Foxrush Farm Community Woodland is situated just outside Redcar on the southern edge of Dormanstown, it is 45 hectares in size. On its east side sits Kirkleatham Lane and on its west sits Meggitts Lane. In 1997 it was planted with a mixture of trees. It was originally part of the Kirkleatham Estate which was property of the Turner Family. The Turner family were responsible for an improvement in farming methods by building farmsteads within the land which meant that people could live in and farm an area, rather than having to travel to the fields from the village. The Foxrush Farm buildings date back to the mid 18th century it is now owned by Saltburn Animal Rescue Association (SARA). The land would have probably been very wet and marshy until the 17th century when drainage began. A grid iron network of ditches was developed which drain into the Tees at Dabholm. They still remain at the site today and are bordered by hedges planted in the medieval times.

At the north side of the farm lies an archaeological site which was first noticed in pictures taken in 1990 from an aerial viewpoint. Crop marks, which show up as darker features, indicated a rectangular ditch enclosure typical of the Iron Age period, 2000 years ago. Geophysical surveys indicated that the site extended over a larger area than the photographs suggested and that there may have been industrial activity taking place. Between 2002 and 2006, archaeological excavations took place, including two weeks of school visits followed by a family open day on the last Sunday. Tees Archaeology managed the excavation with support from the Teesside Archaeological Society. Many local volunteers assisted with the archaeology. Archaeologists have established the extent of the external ditch feature discovered in 2002. Two distinct areas of the settlement were noted. To the north of the farm, several features including a spread of burnt material containing clay structures indicated an industrial area. The features in this area appear to represent the entrance to an enclosure within the larger enclosure. The original entrance through two large ditch terminals was redefined over a long period of time with a series of smaller ditches, posts and pits. The area seems have been used for dumping a large quantity of burnt material, possibly from metal working, but it is difficult to say whether this was a deliberate act, or just the use of some handy holes for getting rid of the rubbish. On the edge of this were two large pits containing large stone blocks and several postholes, which may have been foundations for a building.

At the east side of the present day farmhouse a large roundhouse was discovered, with daub from the walls still in situ. A theory about the house was that it had been extended into its original external drainage ditch, hence the existence of a wall below floor level. Another roundhouse was found in 2004, located north of the one excavated previously. The way they faced would enable the sunrise to shine into the house and waken the family, as there were no windows. Their doorways are on the eastern side, which would have been covered by skins rather than a wooden door. A ditch ran between the two houses, which could have functioned similarly to a garden fence of today. Another small ditch was found containing the sherds of a complete pottery crucible which was used for metal working, fragments of bronze were still stuck on its inside.
