= Watermead =

Watermead may refer to the following places in England:

- Watermead, Buckinghamshire
- Watermead, Gloucestershire, a location
- Watermead Country Park, Leicestershire
