= Warrenby Halt railway station =

Disused railway station in Redcar and Cleveland, England

Warrenby Halt

General information
- Location: Warrenby, Redcar and Cleveland; England
- Coordinates: 54.61556°N 1.11347°W
- Grid reference: NZ573248
- Platforms: 2

Other information
- Status: Disused

History
- Original company: North Eastern Railway
- Post-grouping: London and North Eastern Railway; North Eastern Region of British Railways

Key dates
- By October 1920: Opened as Warrenby Halt
- 5 May 1969: Renamed Warrenby
- 19 June 1978: Closed and replaced by British Steel Redcar
Location

Warrenby Halt was a railway station which opened in 1920. It was built to serve the village of Warrenby near Redcar, England, and the nearby Dorman Long steelworks. It consisted of wooden platforms and brick shelters and was gas-lit.

In 1978, the railway was diverted to allow for the building of the Redcar steelworks, leaving Warrenby bypassed. A new station, Redcar British Steel, opened on the deviated line to take its place.

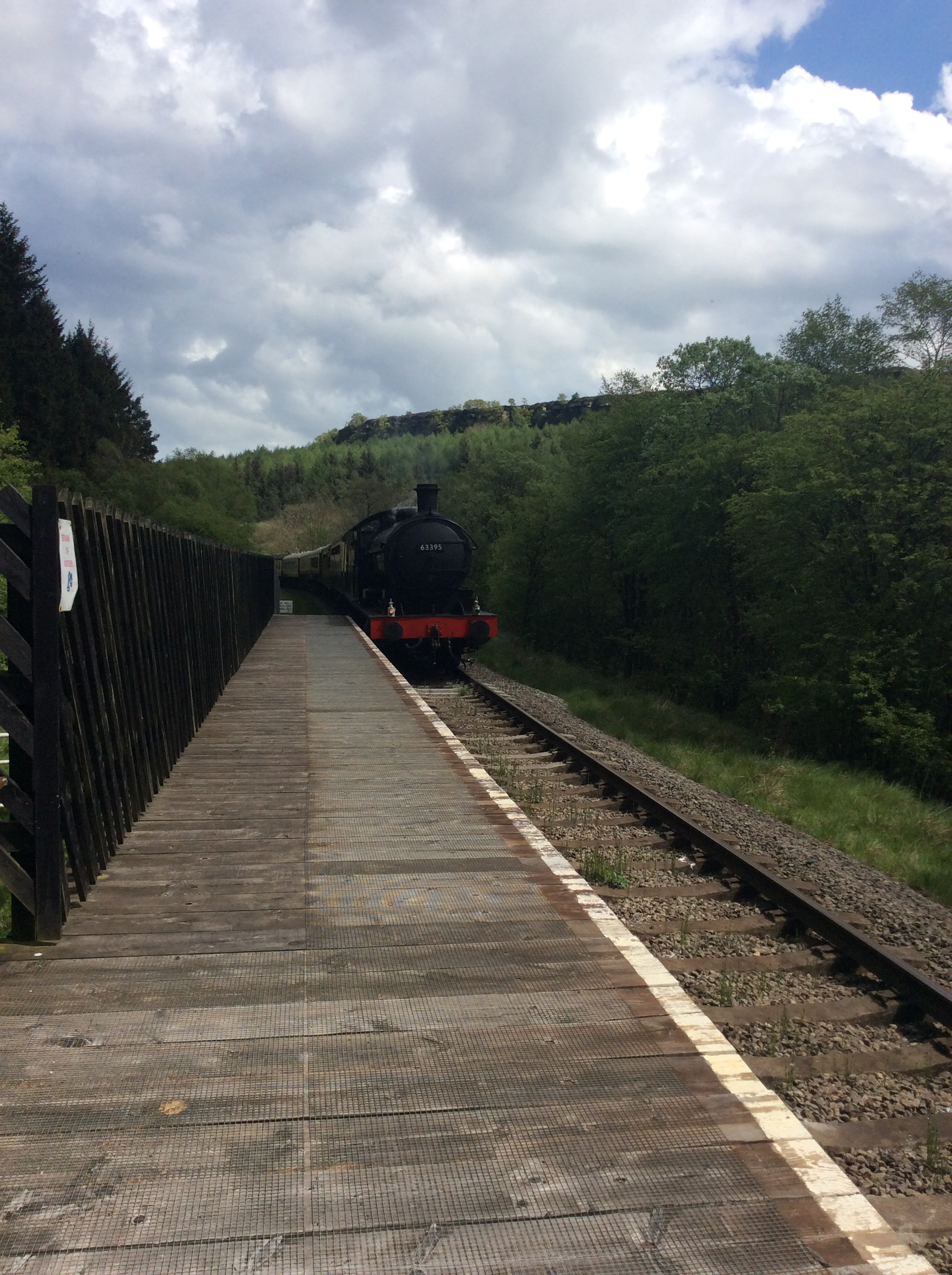
Q6 63395 arrives at Newton Dale Halt, the station being built using materials from the old Warrenby Halt railway station.

One of Warrenby Halt's platforms survives at Newton Dale Halt on the North Yorkshire Moors Railway.

Preceding station	Historical railways	Following station
Redcar Central; Line closed, station open	London and North Eastern Railway; Tees Valley Line	Grangetown; Line and station closed
