= Watten =

Watten may refer to:

== Places ==
- Watten, Nord, a commune in the Nord département of France
  - Blockhaus d'Éperlecques or Watten bunker, intended to be a launching facility for the V-2 ballistic missile
- Watten, Highland, a village in Caithness, in the Highland local government area of Scotland

== People ==
- Barrett Watten (born 1948), American poet connected to the Language poets
- Dustin Watten (born 1986), American volleyball player

== Games ==
- Watten (card game), a card game popular in Bavaria and Austria

== See also ==
- Watton (disambiguation)
- Wattens, a market community in Austria
