= Wanborough =

Wanborough may refer to:

- Wanborough, Surrey, England
  - Wanborough Manor
- Wanborough, Wiltshire, England
- Wanborough, Illinois, United States
