= Waterhales =

Hamlet in Essex, England

Coordinates: 51.637°N 0.22°E

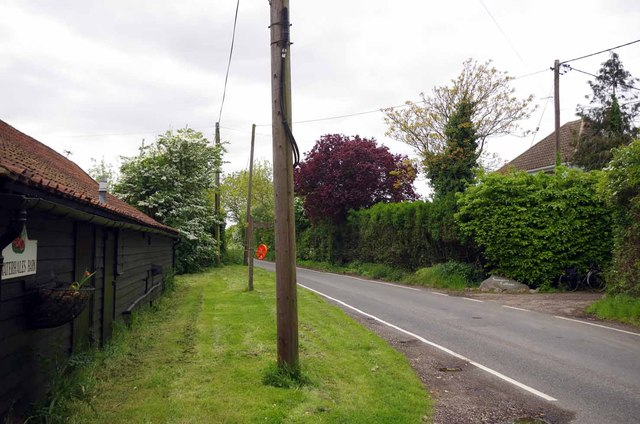

- Location within Essex
- Civil parish: Navestock
- District: Brentwood
- Shire county: Essex
- Region: East
- Country: England
- Sovereign state: United Kingdom
- Police: Essex
- Fire: Essex
- Ambulance: East of England

Waterhales is a hamlet and a farm near the M25 motorway, in the civil parish of Navestock, in the Brentwood district, in the county of Essex, England. It is located about three miles away from the town of Brentwood. As its name suggests, there are a few ponds in Waterhales.
