= Warham, Herefordshire =

Village in United Kingdom

Coordinates: 52.05146°N 2.75535°W

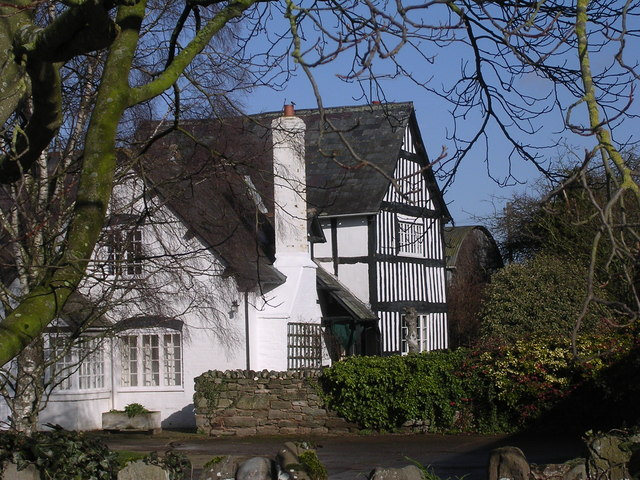
Warham Court

Warham is a place in the English county of Herefordshire. It is situated about 3 km west of the city of Hereford, close to the north bank of the River Wye. The population of the village at the 2011 census was 193.
