= Wotton railway station =

Wotton railway station may refer to:

- Wotton railway station (Brill Tramway), former station in Buckinghamshire, England
- Wotton railway station (Great Central Railway), former station in Buckinghamshire, England

== See also ==
- Wootton railway station
