= Wardy Hill =

Hamlet in Cambridgeshire, England

Coordinates: 52.4172°N 0.1649°E

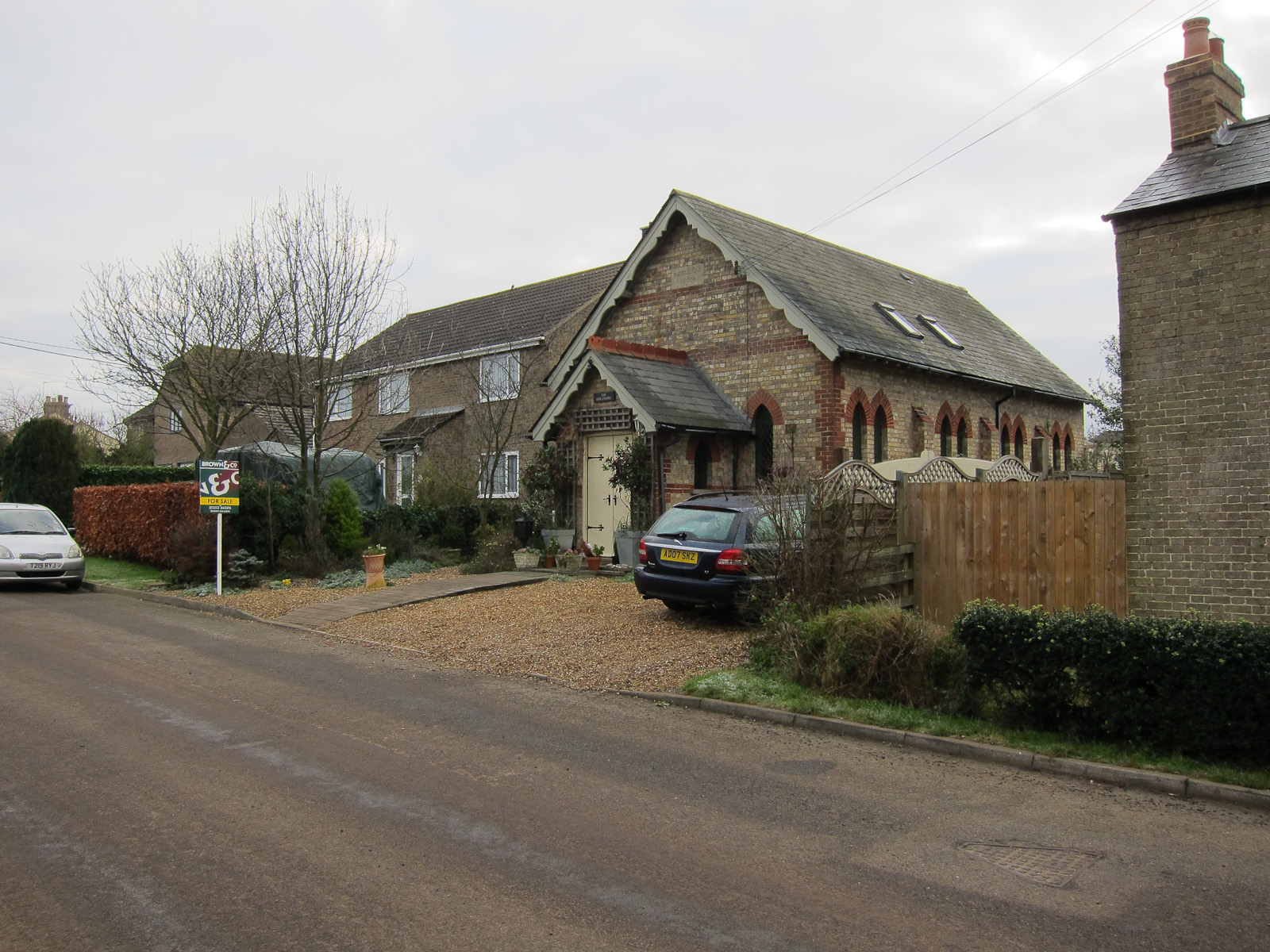
- Converted chapel

- Location within Cambridgeshire
- OS grid reference: TL4782
- District: East Cambridgeshire
- Shire county: Cambridgeshire
- Region: East
- Country: England
- Sovereign state: United Kingdom
- Post town: Ely
- Postcode district: CB6
- Dialling code: 01353
- Police: Cambridgeshire
- Fire: Cambridgeshire
- Ambulance: East of England

Wardy Hill is a hamlet in Coveney civil parish, part of East Cambridgeshire, England. It is also the site of a former Iron Age Hill fort
