= Warburton Green =

Coordinates: 53.36°N 2.31°W

- Location within Greater Manchester
- OS grid reference: SJ795849
- Metropolitan borough: Trafford
- Metropolitan county: Greater Manchester
- Region: North West
- Country: England
- Sovereign state: United Kingdom
- Post town: ALTRINCHAM
- Postcode district: WA15
- Dialling code: 0161
- Police: Greater Manchester
- Fire: Greater Manchester
- Ambulance: North West
- UK Parliament: Altrincham and Sale West

Warburton Green is a district of Hale Barns, Greater Manchester. It is situated to the south east of the centre of the village, close to the M56 and River Bollin. The housing estate grew up around the original hamlet, which was formed by Tanyard Farm and neighbouring properties on Chapel Lane. Warburton Green was originally in Ringway parish.
