= Warmonds Hill =

Coordinates: 52.30451°N 0.59933°W

Warmonds Hill is a district of Higham Ferrers (where to population is included), Northamptonshire located north west of the town centre.

It westerly border is the River Nene and A45 trunk road while its easterly border is the former A6.
