= Watergate, Cornwall =

Hamlet in Cornwall, England

Coordinates: 50.602°N 4.659°W

Watergate
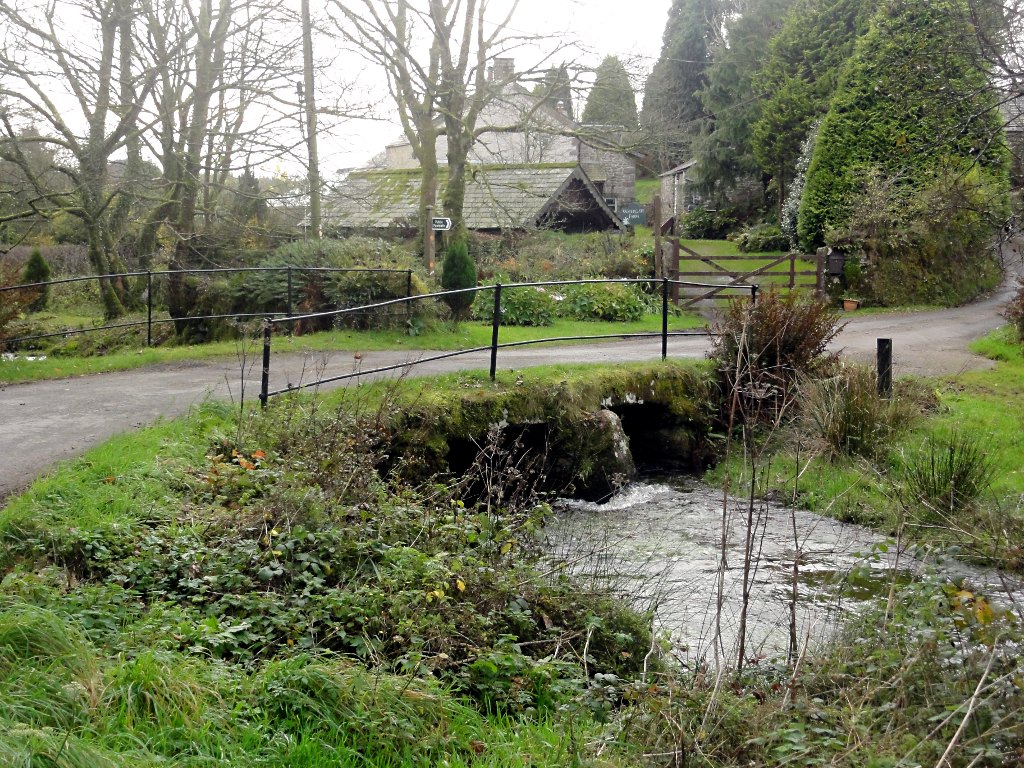
- Bridge at Watergate

- Location within Cornwall
- Civil parish: Advent
- Unitary authority: Cornwall
- Ceremonial county: Cornwall
- Region: South West
- Country: England
- Sovereign state: United Kingdom
- Police: Devon and Cornwall
- Fire: Cornwall
- Ambulance: South Western

Watergate is a hamlet in the civil parish of Advent in Cornwall, England, United Kingdom. There is also a hamlet called Watergate in the civil parish of Pelynt in Cornwall.
