= Wanson =

Hamlet in Cornwall, England

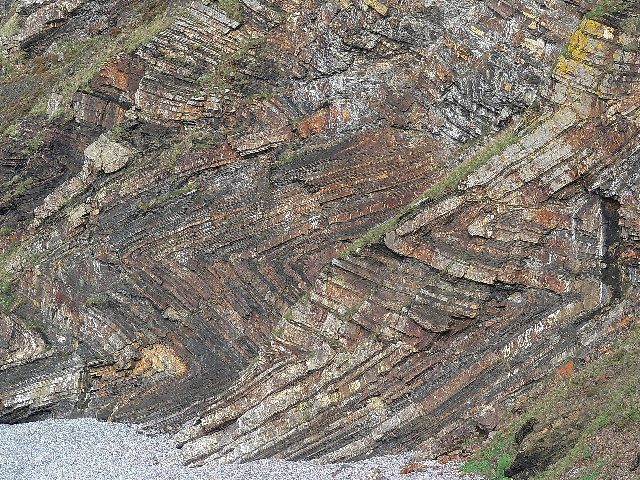
Wanson Mouth

Wanson is a hamlet near Poundstock in Cornwall, England, United Kingdom. The Wanson Water flows into the sea at Wanson Mouth.
