= Waye =

Waye is a given name and surname. Notable people with the name include:

== Given name ==
- Waye Mason, Canadian politician and businessman

== Surname ==
- Anthony Waye, film production executive
- Cecil Waye (1884–1965), pseudonym of John Street, British novelist
- Forman Waye (1886–1967), Canadian merchant, machinist and political figure
- Gervais Waye-Hive (born 1988), Seychellois professional footballer
- Hendrick Waye (1877–1961), Australian rules footballer
- Libby Waye (1885–1951), Australian sportsman
- Tom Waye (1877–1961), Australian rules footballer
