= Watton's Green =

Hamlet in Essex, England

Coordinates: 51.634°N 0.210°E

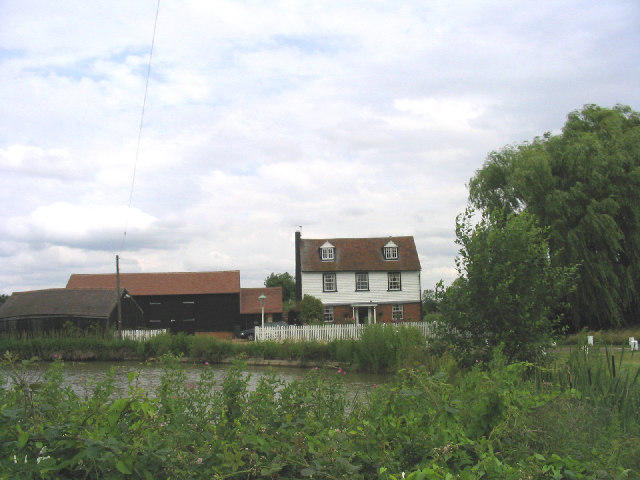
- Watton Farm

- Location within Essex
- Civil parish: Navestock
- District: Brentwood
- Shire county: Essex
- Region: East
- Country: England
- Sovereign state: United Kingdom
- Police: Essex
- Fire: Essex
- Ambulance: East of England

Watton's Green or Wattons Green is a hamlet in the civil parish of Navestock, in the Brentwood district, in the county of Essex, England. It is located about 4 miles away from the town of Brentwood, near the M25 motorway.
