= Warnborough Green =

Village in Hampshire, England

Coordinates: 51.254320°N 0.958056°W

Warborough Green
- Location within Hampshire
- OS grid reference: SU7281051088
- District: Hart
- Shire county: Hampshire
- Region: South East
- Country: England
- Sovereign state: United Kingdom
- Post town: ODIHAM
- Postcode district: RG29
- Police: Hampshire and Isle of Wight
- Fire: Hampshire and Isle of Wight
- Ambulance: South Central
- UK Parliament: North East Hampshire

Warnborough Green is a village in the civil parish of Odiham in Hampshire, England. It lies approximately 1 mile (1.75 km) north-east from Odiham.
