= Warrenby =

Area of Redcar in North Yorkshire, England

Coordinates: 54.61667°N 1.1°W

- Location within North Yorkshire
- OS grid reference: NZ582249
- Unitary authority: Redcar and Cleveland
- Ceremonial county: North Yorkshire
- Region: North East
- Country: England
- Sovereign state: United Kingdom
- Post town: REDCAR
- Postcode district: TS10
- Dialling code: 01642
- Police: Cleveland
- Fire: Cleveland
- Ambulance: North East

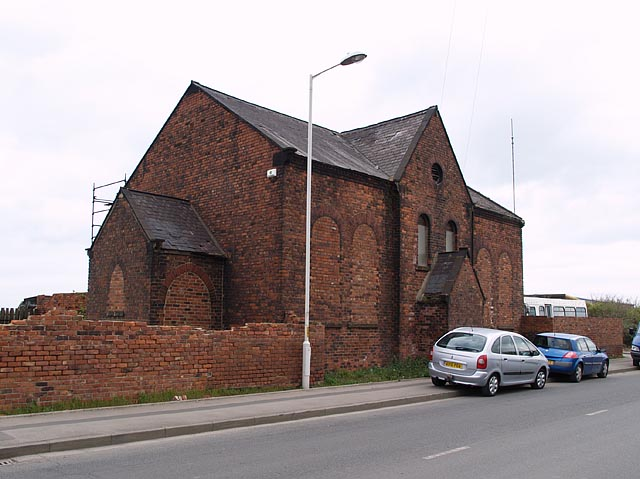
The former church in Warrenby

Warrenby is a depopulated area of Redcar in the ceremonial county of North Yorkshire, England. It is a light industrial area and is no longer residential.

Warrenby is on the edge of Coatham Marsh, and was originally called Warrenstown. It was founded in 1873, to provide housing for workers at the nearby ironworks of Downey & Co and Walker Maynard.

In the Warrenby Disaster of 1895, eleven men, many from the village of Warrenby, were killed in a boiler explosion at the works.

Warrenby Halt railway station was opened in 1920 as a halt on the Middlesbrough & Redcar Railway. This was to serve the nearby Dorman Long steelworks. In 1978, the railway was realigned to make way for the expansion of Redcar steel plant, and so the halt was demolished.
