= Coatham Marsh =

Nature reserve in Northern England

Coatham Marsh local nature reserve
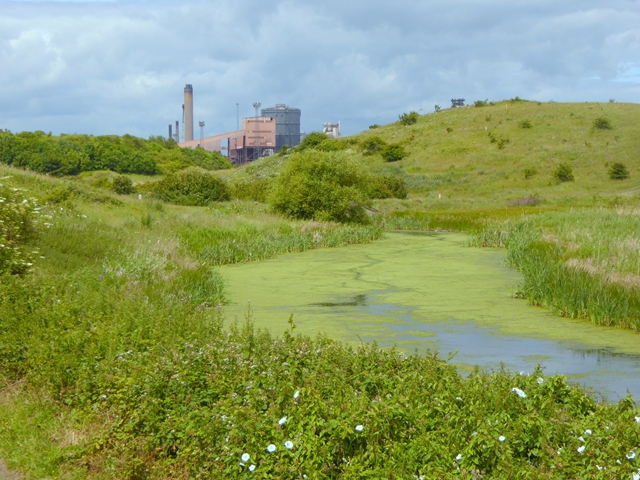
- Pond on Coatham Marsh Nature Reserve
- Interactive map of Coatham Marsh local nature reserve
- Location: Coatham, Redcar and Cleveland, England
- Nearest town: Redcar
- OS grid: NZ585250
- Coordinates: 54.614°N 1.087°W
- Area: 54 hectares (130 acres)
- Designated: SSSI – 31 July 2018
- Manager: Tees Valley Wildlife Trust
- Website: Official webpage

Coatham Marsh is a 54-hectare (130-acre) nature reserve near to Redcar in the borough of Redcar and Cleveland, England. The site is a local nature reserve and part of the Teesmouth and Cleveland Coast SSSI.

== History ==
Coatham Marsh has been pinpointed as the site of one of the last strongholds of northern nobles as they held out against the invasion by William the Conqueror. A battle is believed to have been fought here, in either 1069, or 1070, with the defensive structures remaining visible until the early 20th century.

The site was used in the 12th and 13th centuries as a place to produce salt from seawater. The evidence of these saltings can still be found in the present day marsh.

In the early 1840s, as the land remained undeveloped, it was regularly flooded by high tides.

The habitat suffered pollution, during the 1960s 70s and 80s, due to waste from local steel and iron plants being dumped onto Coatham Marsh.

The building of the Redcar steelworks complex in the late 1970s, necessitated the diversion of the railway line to Redcar and Saltburn through the middle of Coatham Marsh, splitting the site in two.

The site was owned by British Steel (later Corus, then Tata Steel), and since 1982 it has been managed by the Tees Valley Wildlife Trust. Coatham Marsh was designated an SSSI as part of the Teesside and Cleveland Coast in 2018.

The site has a small beck called The Fleet which drains south-westwards from Redcar and feeds into the River Tees via Dabholm Gut. The Fleet supplies and drains several reedbed-fringed ponds on Coatham Marsh, and drains an area of 20 square kilometres (7.7 sq mi). Coatham Marsh is bounded by the A1085 to the south, Tod Point Road to the north, Locke Park and Coatham to the east, and the former Redcar Steelworks to the west (now known as the Teesworks site).

== Flora and fauna ==
Otters have been noted on the marsh, having been assumed to be behind the depletion of managed fish stocks in the ponds on the marsh. Over 200 species of bird have been noted at the site, including spoonbill, gadwall, wood sandpiper, white-winged black tern, Temminck's stint, black redstart, curlew sandpiper, stone curlew, pochard, reed warbler, reed bunting, water rail, and tufted duck. Dragon and damselflies noted at the site include the common darter, common blue and large red damselfly.

The saline-loving moss bryum marratii (Baltic Byrum), has historically been noted at the site. Other plants that have been noted at the site include the northern marsh orchid, the yellow wort, and the bee orchid.
